= Cassard =

Cassard may refer to:

- Jacques Cassard (1679–1740), French privateer and naval officer
- Philippe Cassard (born 1962), French classical pianist
- Stéphane Cassard (1972– ), French footballer
- French ship Cassard, the name of several French Navy ships
