= Darhe Jesarim =

Former synagogue in Paramaribo, Suriname

Religion
- Affiliation: Judaism (former)
- Rite: Nusach Sefard
- Ecclesiastical or organizational status: Synagogue (1759–1817)
- Status: Defunct

Location
- Location: Sivaplein, Paramaribo District
- Country: Suriname

Architecture
- Established: 1759
- Completed: 1759
- Demolished: 1817

Darhe Jesarim was a former Jewish congregation and synagogue formed in Sivaplein, in the district of Paramaribo, Suriname. The members of the congregation comprised entirely Afro-Surinamese Jews. Founded in 1759, it was the earliest known synagogue in the African diaspora. The synagogue was disbanded in 1817 and Afro-Surinamese and mixed-race Jews were integrated, as second-class members, into Suriname's predominantly white congregations.

== History ==
By 1759, enslaved and free Afro-Surinamese Jews (sometimes referred to by scholars as "Eurafrican Jews") had formed their own brotherhood and called it Darhe Jesarim ("Path of the Righteous" in Hebrew). The synagogue was located in Sivaplein. Darhe Jesarim both educated Jews of color and provided a place where Afro-Surinamese Jews could worship without the inequities and distinctions made in Paramaribo's white-run Neveh Shalom and Tzedek ve-Shalom congregations. Jews of African descent were not allowed to say prayers for the dead in white synagogues, nor were white Jews allowed to the prayers on their behalf. Darhe Jesarim did not have its own cemetery. Joseph Cohen Nassy, one of the leaders of the synagogue, died in 1793.

In 1817, Darhe Jesarim was disbanded and its members were absorbed back into the city's two white-run synagogues as second-class members.

== See also ==
- African-American Jews
- History of the Jews in Suriname
- Racism in Jewish communities
