= History of the Jews in Suriname =

The location of Suriname in South America

The history of the Jews in Suriname starts in 1639, as the English government allowed Spanish and Portuguese Jews from the Netherlands, Portugal and Italy to settle the region, coming to the old capital Torarica.

== History ==
After the arrival of the first Jews in 1639, as part of the tobacco-growing Marshall Creek settlement, a ketubah or Jewish marriage act, was recorded by a rabbi in 1643. The Marshall Creek settlement was eventually abandoned, as had other pre-1650 attempts at colonization (See also History of Suriname).

In 1652, a new group that migrated under the leadership of Francis, Lord Willoughby came to Suriname and settled in the Jodensavanne area, not far from the then-capital of Torarica. Many of these were part of a large-scale immigration of the Jewish plantocracy of Pernambuco, who had been instrumental in the innovation and industrialization of the cultivation and processing of sugarcane, including the use of slave labor. Some of this knowledge had been transferred to the Dutch West India Company during its occupation of Dutch Brazil. Yet more knowledge was carried by planters themselves fleeing before the Spanish and Portuguese Inquisition after the Portuguese recaptured Pernambuco and dismantled the policies of the deposed Dutch regime. These refugee planters often retained enough capital to start new plantations in the colonies to which they fled.

Historian Bert Koene writes,

The Jews were a stabilizing factor in the Surinamese community. They had the mentality of long-term residents, unlike most of the other colonists, who went around with the idea that they eventually, after having earned enough money, would return to their fatherland. For the Jews the colony was really a safe place, free from persecution and social exclusion. Such a life was almost impossible to find elsewhere.

A third group of Jewish immigrants came 1664, after their expulsion from the Pernambucan capital city of Recife and then French Guiana, led by David Cohen Nassy. According to the Encyclopedia of Latin America, "Suriname was one of the most important centers of the Jewish population in the Western Hemisphere, and Jews there were planters and slaveholders."

On August 17, 1665, the English formally granted Jews in Suriname freedom of religion including the right to build synagogues and religious schools, as well as an independent court of justice and private civic guard under their exclusive control, making the Surinamese Jews the only diaspora community with "complete political autonomy" prior to the foundation of Israel in 1948. These rights were left undisturbed when the Dutch took over the colony in 1667.

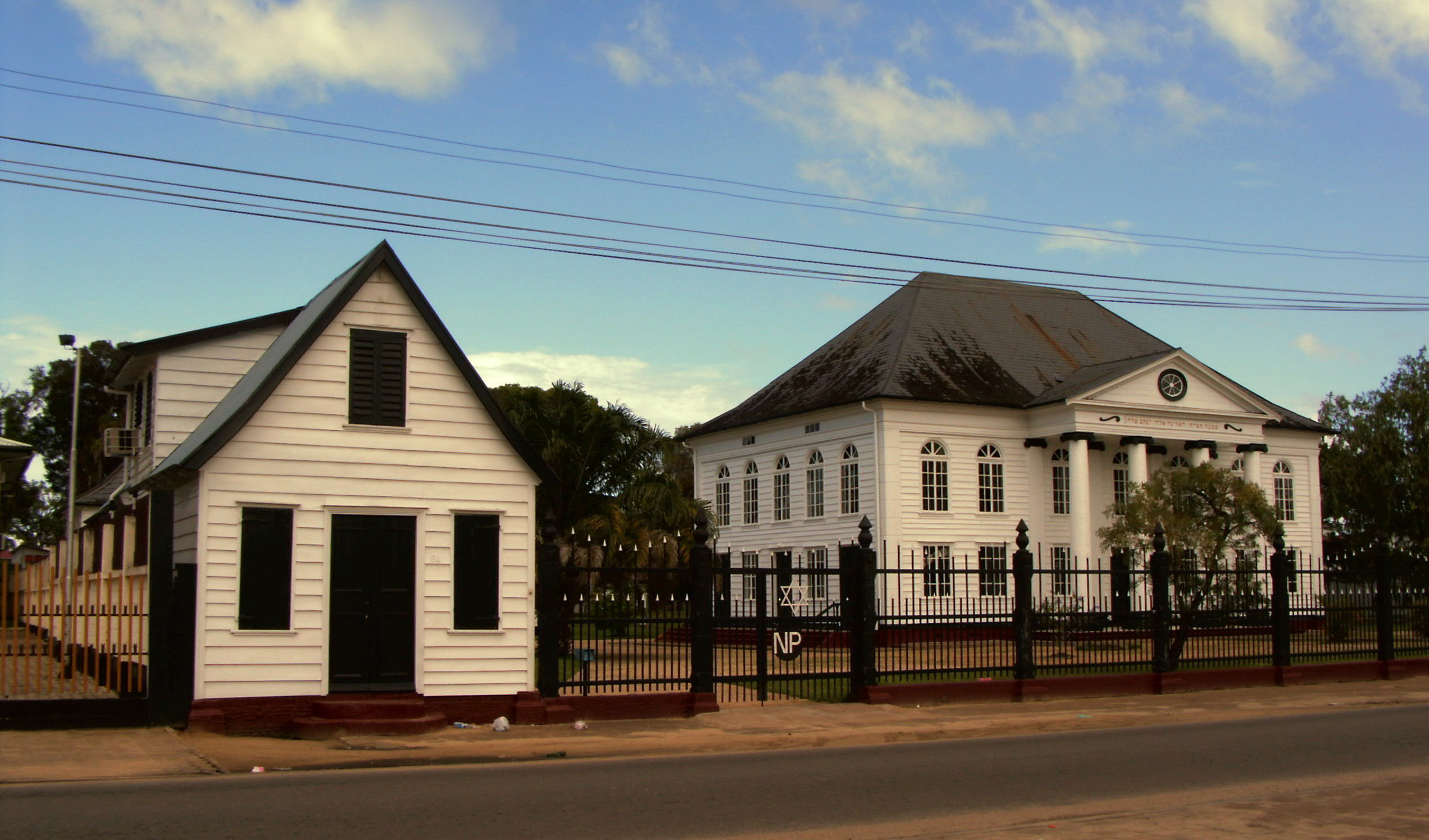
Neveh Shalom Synagogue (right)

The plantation economy of the Jodensavanne—an area that was settled and planted with sugarcane—relied, as had the economy of Pernambuco before it, on slave labour. The community declined in the wake of the French Cassard expedition in 1712 and the levies he instituted, competition from beet sugar, and attacks by Maroons—slaves who had managed to escape from the plantations into the jungle, interacted with local Native American tribes, and now raided the holdings of their former masters as free men. Most of Suriname's Jews eventually relocated to the capital of Paramaribo, but they would return to the synagogue in the Jodensavanne to celebrate the holidays until 10 September 1832, when a fire destroyed the village and synagogue. The savanna area was subsequently overtaken with jungle regrowth.

=== Black Jews ===
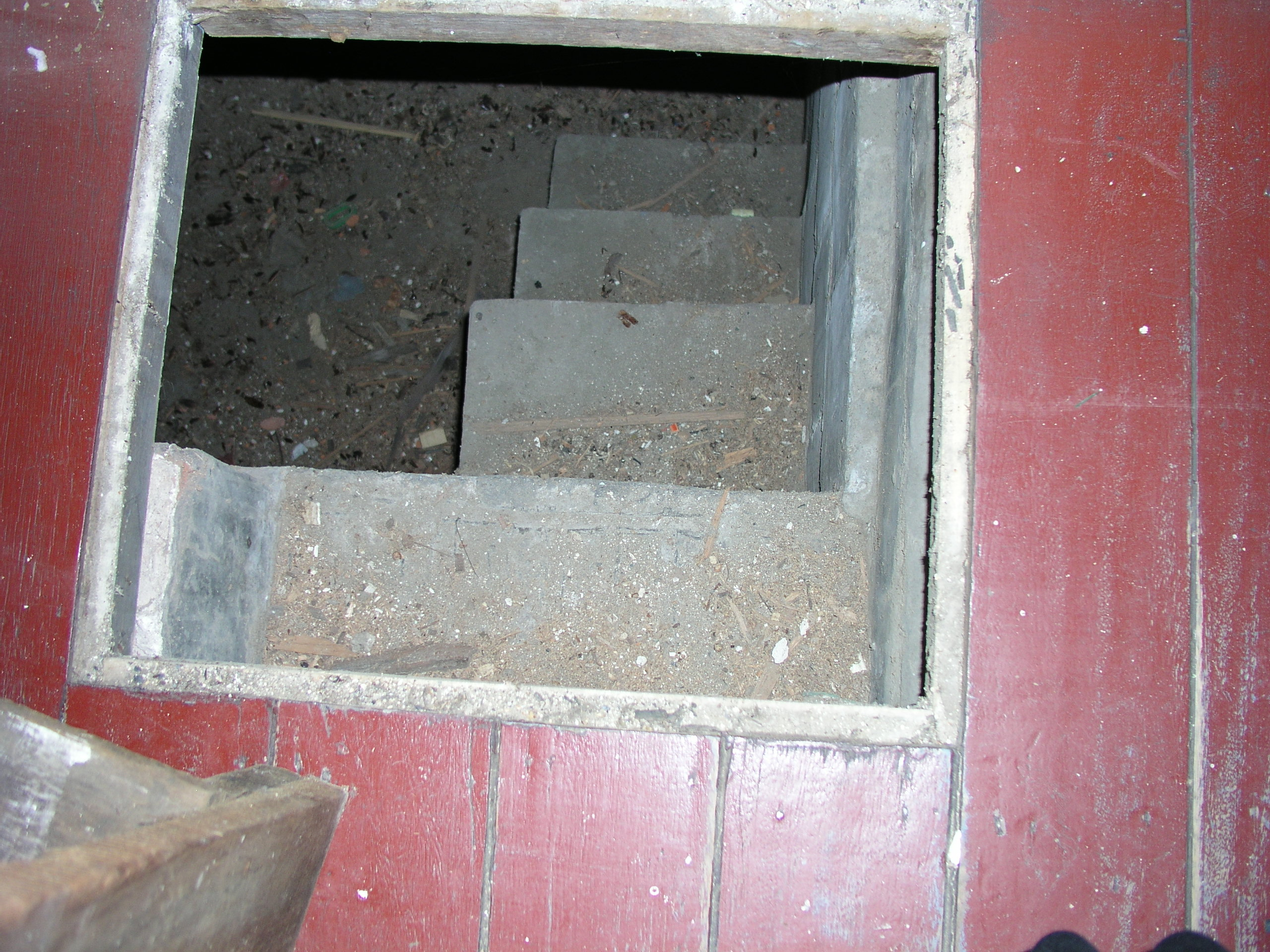
18th Century Ritual bath (now dry) at the Tzedek ve-Shalom Synagogue in Paramaribo, Suriname. As part of the conversion process, people would immerse in this bath. Photo by Laura Arnold Leibman, 2008.

Jews with African ancestry have lived in the Americas since the colonial era. Before the 1820s, the largest Jewish communities were in the Caribbean, as were the largest communities of Jews with ancestral ties to Africa. Of the Caribbean Jewish communities, Suriname had the most sizable Black Jewish population. European Jews in Suriname converted both people they enslaved and the children of Jewish men and women of color. Incorporation of enslaved people into Judaism was so important that in 1767–68, Dutch Jew Salomon Levy Maduro published Sefer Brit Itschak, which contained the names of seven ritual circumcisers in Suriname along with prayers for converting and circumcising enslaved people. Although initially most Afro-Surinamese people entered Judaism through conversion, by the end of the eighteenth century, many members of the Black Jewish community had been Jews from birth for several generations. Black Jews were never regarded as white Jews and were discriminated against.

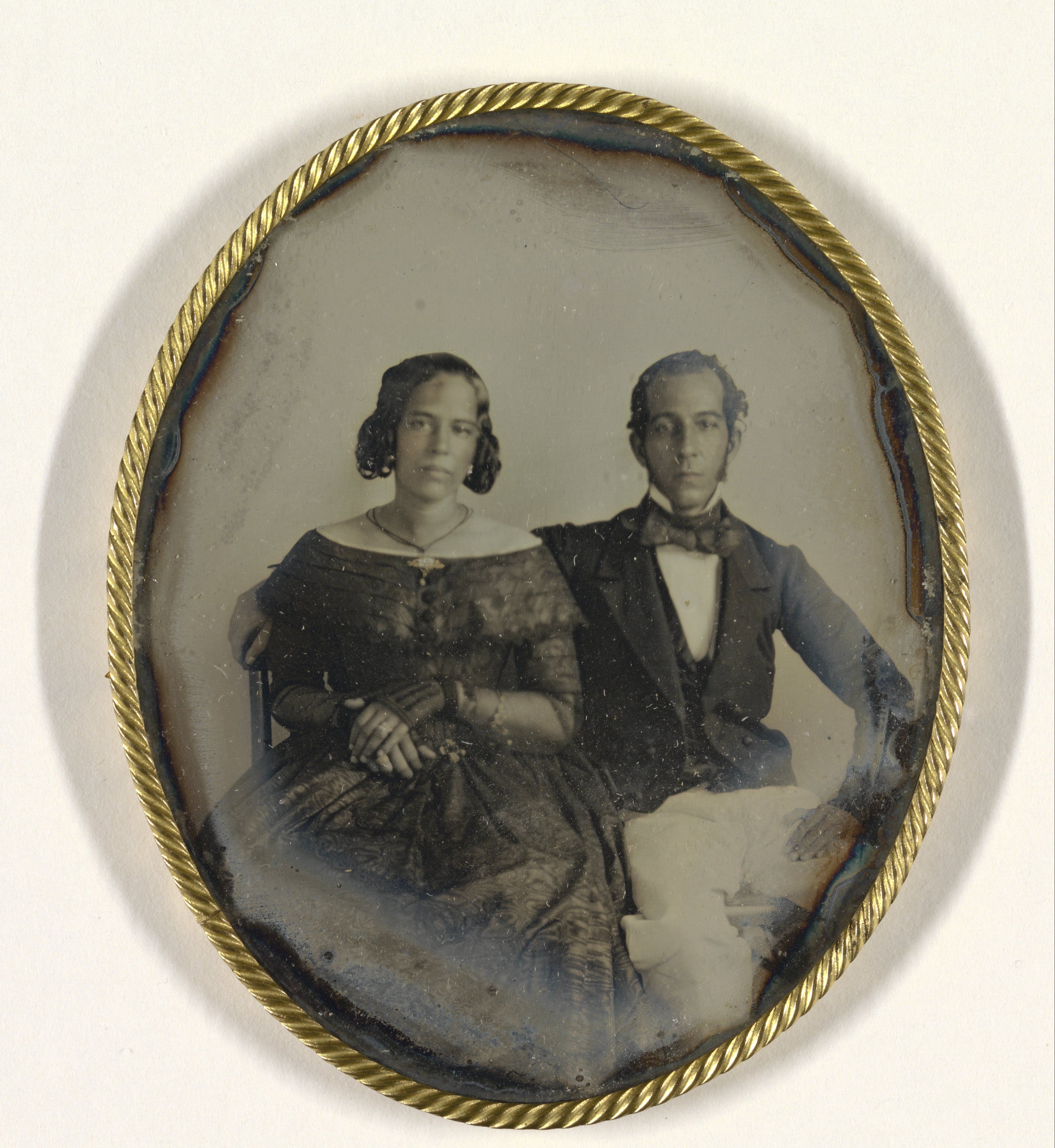
Portrait of a married couple in Suriname (Johannes Ellis and Maria Louisa de Hart)

By 1759, Afro-Surinamese Jews (sometimes referred to by scholars as "Eurafrican Jews") had formed their own brotherhood called Darhe Jesarim ("Path of the Righteous"). Darhe Jesarim both educated Jews of color and provided a place where Afro-Surinamese Jews could worship without the inequities and distinctions made in Paramaribo's Neveh Shalom and Tzedek ve-Shalom congregations. In 1817, Darhe Jesarim was disbanded and its members were absorbed back into the city's two white-run synagogues. Late eighteenth-century census takers tabulated that 10% of Suriname's Jewish community was non-white. One historian has suggested, however, that by the end of the eighteenth century the majority of Jews in Suriname may have had at least one African ancestor, even if they were considered white at the time. Famous Surinamese artists and figures with Jewish ancestry include Maria Louisa de Hart, Augusta Curiel, and Josef Nassy.

During the nineteenth and twentieth centuries some members of Suriname's community travelled north, and settled in North American cities. For example, in 1857, a German-Jewish journalist interviewed several African American women who worshipped at Congregation Shearith Israel in New York who had immigrated from Suriname.

== Identity ==
Jews in Suriname were initially split into the more populous Sephardim concentrated in the Jewish Savanna, and the much later arriving and less numerous Ashkenazim at the Neve Salom synagogue (the only still functioning synagogue).

Although today the term Creole (as used in the context of Suriname) is the word used locally for 'Afro-Surinamese' (people or culture), its original meaning carried a negative connotation to mean that a white European person had forgotten how to be a "good Jew" (or proper Englishman, etc.) due to having adopted some characteristics that European communities considered "native".

Especially Sephardic Jewish men 'interacted' with the black slaves on their plantations, and the usually illegitimate children with African women were raised as Jews and given Jewish names. By the 18th century this black and coloured population had grown considerably. Black and coloured Jews were not considered 'real' Jews by the white Jews, the first rules which formally classified these 'mulatos' as not being jechidim were formulated by the Beracha Ve Shalom synagogue in 1754. Black and multiracial Jews were allowed inside the synagogues, but were not allowed to participate in any of the rituals, and had to sit on special pews which were lower than the others. In 1841 black and coloured Jews were given equal religious rights in Suriname.

Some Jewish family names have endured and are now considered Afro-Surinamese family names and the names of the Saramaka clan of Maroons refer to the Jewish plantation owners their ancestors escaped from. In the cemeteries of Paramaribo Jewish tombstones appear alongside creole ones.

Identity can be used to exclude persons from a community, but it can also be used to force people to be part of community against their will. During the 17th and 18th centuries forced inclusion was commonplace in both the Portuguese and High German Jewish communities and the rigid identity boundaries were often supported by legislation. Though the cultural identity of Portuguese Jews was defined as being a white colonial elite, this identity existed alongside an aggressive policy to include poor Jews and Jews of color.

== Synagogues ==
Three official synagogues were built in Suriname: Beracha Ve Shalom in 1685, in the Jodensavanne; Neveh Shalom Synagogue in 1719, built by Ashkenazi Jews in the new capital of Paramaribo; and Zedek ve Shalom in 1735, built by Sephardic Jews. Eventually the Jews of color formed their own synagogue: Darje Jesariem or Darhe Jesarim in 1791, although the white Jews considered this legally more of a fraternity—it only lasted until 1794. The building has long been destroyed (in 1804), but in its place is a city square known as Sivaplein, siva meaning 'fraternity' in the language of the Portuguese Jews.

== Depopulation ==
In the eighteenth century, Suriname was rocked by a series of crises which hit Jewish plantations, some of which were among the oldest in the colony, particularly hard. Expenses tended to increase as a result of: a hefty tribute levied by the Cassard expedition; the 1773 collapse of Dietz, a major Amsterdam sugarcane refinery, in the wake of the previous year's financial crisis in the United Kingdom; and the unsustainable accrual of real estate loans. The introduction of sugar beet cultivation in Europe from 1784 and the depletion of soils from overexploitation on Suriname's oldest plantations both decreased revenues. Security conditions deteriorated as a result of ongoing Maroon Wars, while the growth of Paramaribo as the colony's exclusive trading port, nearer to the coast, acted to pull Jews away from Jodensavanne.

As the plantation economy faltered and Jodensavanne depopulated, Jews in Paramaribo found it increasingly difficult not to integrate with other ethnic groups of the country, despite periodic attempts from Jewish leaders in the Netherlands to keep them in line—many simply intermarried with other ethnicities in the 19th century. In 1825 Jewish people in Suriname were given equal rights, though this also entailed their loss of privileges allowing them to police their own community, which they had enjoyed since 1665.

The Sephardic and Ashkenazic communities began to blur together as early as the 18th century, eventually sharing a synagogue for a while. They did not officially fuse until in 1999. In 2004 the last remaining synagogue decided to switch from Orthodox Judaism to Progressive Judaism. About 130 Jewish community members remained in a combined Sephardic and Ashkenazic congregation at Neve Shalom (which includes community hall and mikveh). The second synagogue was rented for use as a computer service shop, its furniture and art loaned to the Israel Museum in Jerusalem.

Most Jews had left Suriname when it was granted independence in 1975 and others left during the civil war of the 1980s. In a 21st-century census, 181 Surinamese people entered "Judaism" as their religion, out of a total population of 560,000.

In the 1990s, the jungle growth in the Jodensavanne was cleared, 450 graves uncovered and the ruins of the synagogue maintained.

== See also ==
- Jodensavanne
