= Battle of Syracuse (1710) =

1710 naval engagement off Sicily

Coordinates: 15.284288°N 37.066228°E

- Part of the War of the Spanish Succession
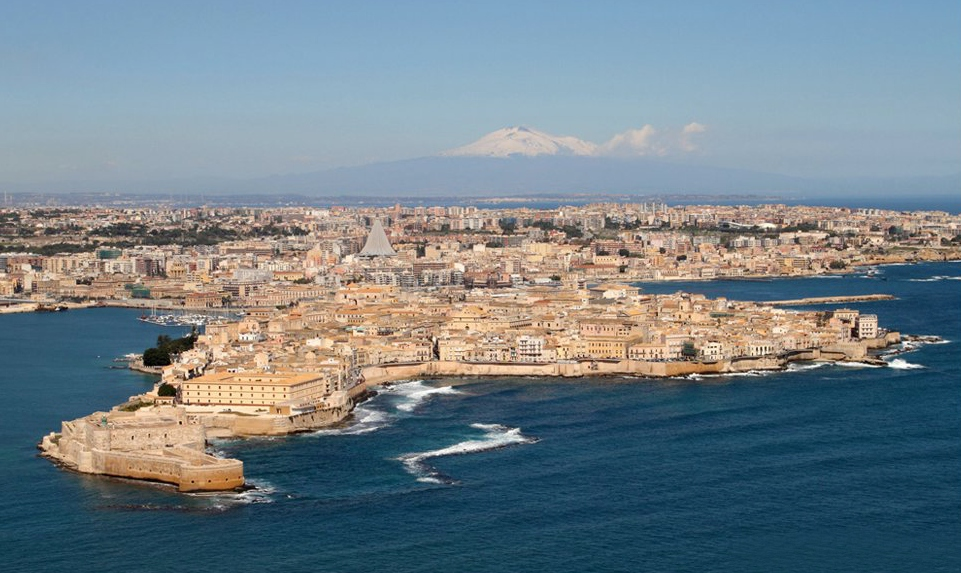
- Aerial view of Syracuse and its port today.
Date	9 November 1710
Location	Off the coast of Syracuse, Sicily
Result	French victory

Belligerents
France	Great Britain

Commanders and leaders
Jacques Cassard	Edward Rumsey

Strength
5 ships of the line	2 ships of the line

Casualties and losses
	2 ships of the line captured

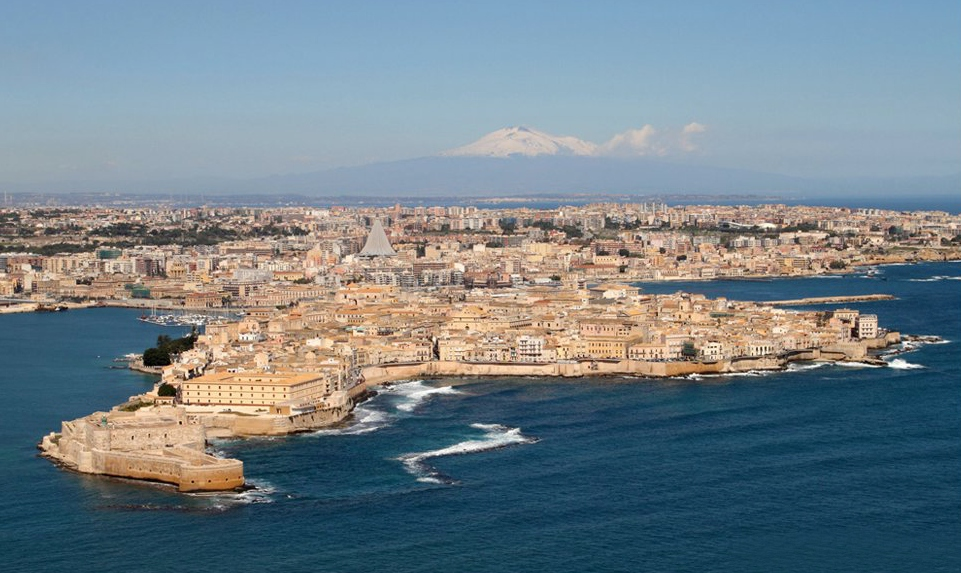
Battle of Syracuse (1710)

The Battle of Syracuse was a naval engagement of the War of the Spanish Succession fought on 9 November 1710, outside the Sicilian port of Syracuse. A French fleet of four ships under the command of Jacques Cassard came to relieve a heavily laden French merchant fleet that had been blockaded in the Syracuse harbour by a British fleet. Cassard arrived off Syracuse when most of the blockading fleet had left to resupply at Port Mahon; he successfully captured Falcon and Pembroke, the two ships left to maintain the blockade, and escorted the fleet to Marseille.
