= Cayenne (Dutch colony) =

Kolonie Cayenne Cayenne
- 1626–1664
- Flag Coat of arms
- Status: Dutch colony
- Capital: Cayenne
- Common languages: Dutch
- History
  - Seized from France: 1626
  - Recaptured by France: 1664
Preceded by	Succeeded by
French Guiana	French Guiana

Cayenne, currently the capital of French Guiana, was a hotly contested area between French and Dutch colonizers in the 17th century. In 1615, Theodore Claessen founded a Dutch colony at Cayenne, but it seems to have perished quickly. Another expedition to found a settlement at Cayenne left Flushing in 1626, under the captaincy of Claude Prevost.

Whereas these early Dutch colonization attempts were organized from the County of Zeeland, in 1635 an expedition was organized from the city of Amsterdam in the County of Holland, much to the dismay of Zeelanders. Under the leadership of David Pietersz. de Vries, a group of about thirty colonists restored an abandoned French fort on Mecoria island on the Cayenne River and tried to cultivate the land. The colonization attempt seems to have ended with De Vries' departure.

In the late 1650s, a more serious attempt at colonization followed. Jan Claessen Langendyck's request to colonize the area again was approved by the Dutch West India Company, and he had set up a colony by 1659. He remained in charge of the colony until 1663, when Quirijn Spranger took over the leadership of the colony.

The Langendyck colony was followed by a Jewish settlement initiated by David Cohen Nassy, consisting mainly of Jewish planters who had to leave Dutch Brazil upon its recapture by Portugal. Nassy received permission to found a colony in January 1658, to be located at some distance from the older colony of Langendyck. Both the Langendyck colony and the Nassy colony were seized by the French in 1664. Nassy and his Jewish colonists then moved to the neighbouring colony of Surinam, at the time still an English colony, where they joined the Jewish colonists at Jodensavanne.

During the Franco-Dutch War, Jacob Binckes captured Cayenne for the Dutch in 1676. Later the same year, the French recaptured their colony under the command of Jean II d'Estrées.

By that time, contention over the colonies in the Guianas had ended, and little changed until the United Kingdom took over the colonies of Berbice, Demerara and Essequibo in 1814. Cayenne is still a French overseas department to this day.
