= Cassard expedition =

1712 naval pillaging expedition

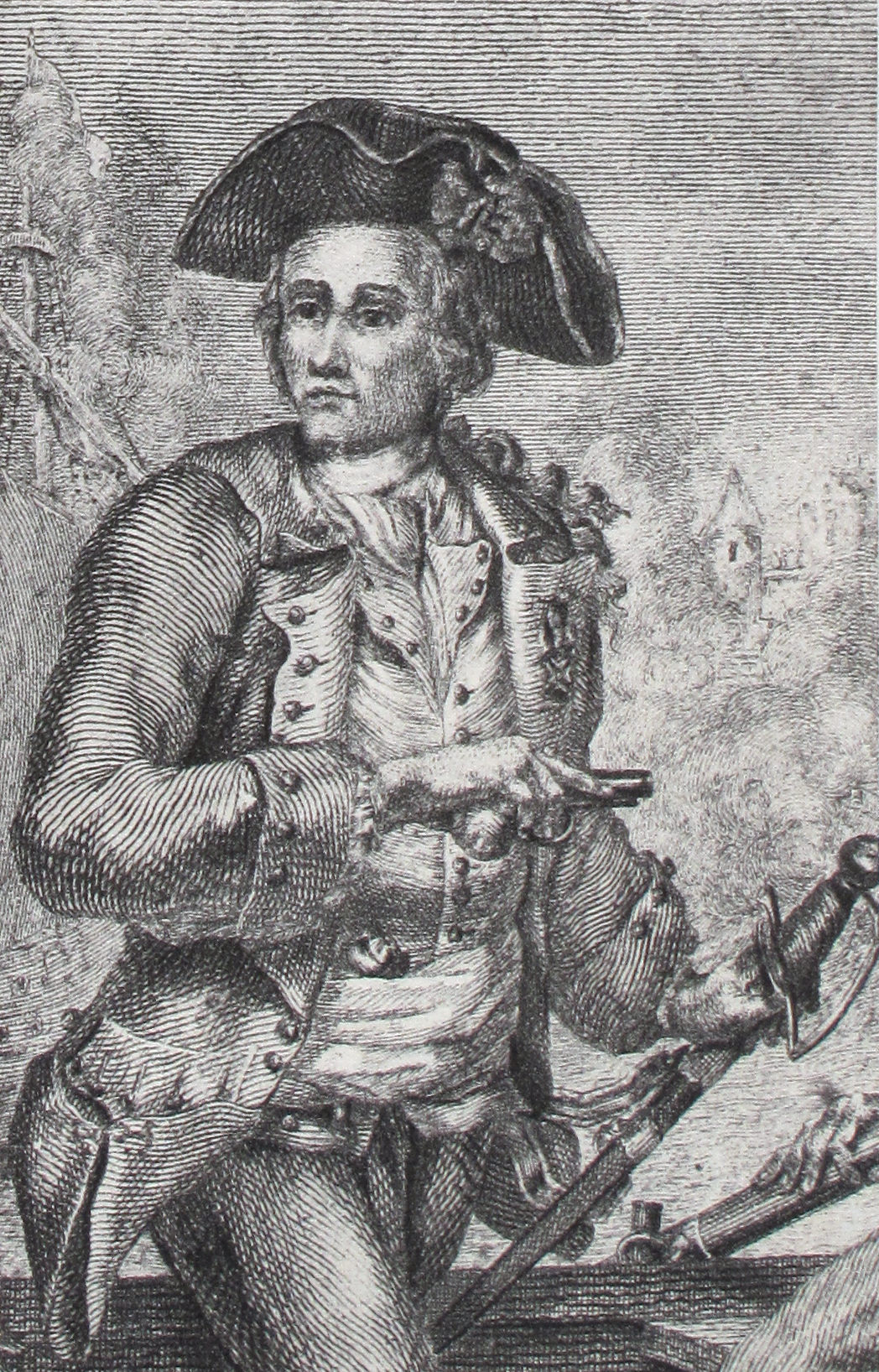
Jacques Cassard, leader of the expedition

The Cassard expedition was a sea voyage by French Navy captain Jacques Cassard in 1712, during the War of the Spanish Succession. Targeting English, Dutch, and Portuguese possessions, he raided and ransomed the colonies of Cape Verde, Sint Eustatius, and Curaçao—factories, depots, and seasoning camps used in the Atlantic slave trade. He also raided and ransomed Montserrat, Antigua, Surinam, Berbice, and Essequibo—wealthy sugar-producing colonies in the Caribbean whose economies were based on the exploitation of slave labor.

In many of the places he landed, officials paid a ransom to avoid pillage; this was not always successful, as Cassard sometimes ignored the terms of the agreements he made. At the end of its expedition, Cassard's squadron returned to France with prizes in the form of cash, goods, and enslaved Africans worth between nine and ten million French livres. Cassard's exploits won him the Order of Saint Louis. Effects on the fortifications, enslaved populations, and profitability of the targeted colonies continued well into the rest of the 18th century.

== Expedition ==
On December 2, 1711, Cassard received command of a squadron of three ships of the line and five frigates from the king. Departing in early March 1712 from the port of Toulon with a fleet of eight ships, 3,000 seamen, and 1,200 soldiers, he embarked on an expedition during which he raided English, Dutch, and Portuguese colonies at Cape Verde and in the Caribbean. Over the course of twenty-seven months, Cassard also raided enemy fleets for ransom.

=== Portuguese and English colonies ===
Among his most notable seizures was the Portuguese capital on the island of Santiago at Cape Verde:

He completely destroyed Santiago, the Portuguese base for their commerce with the West African coast. He took so much plunder, according to Mémoires du temps, that, in order not to overload his squadron, he had to leave behind a part, valued at more than a million livres. (Note: In 1712, Cassard sent the French government a memoir entitled "Relation de la descente faite par Mr Cassard dans la colonie de Surinam".)

After crossing the Atlantic, the squadron stopped at Martinique for resupply, and to unload the plunder taken at Cape Verde. The freebooters of Saint-Domingue, who hadn't forgotten Cassard's actions during the Raid on Cartagena, came to meet him and requested to join the expedition. Now at the head of a small fleet, he sacked the English islands of Montserrat and Antigua before heading to Dutch Guiana.

=== Dutch Guiana and Sint Eustatius ===
Cassard started his Dutch colonial raids in Surinam, which he besieged, captured, and ransomed.

On October 10, 1712, he landed a portion of his force near the plantation Meerzorg across the Suriname River from Paramaribo, the Surinamese capital. From here, he bombarded the city and neighboring Fort Zeelandia in support of an amphibious assault. (Note: "Then it was the Dutch's turn. Cassard went directly to their rich colony Surinam, in the Guianas. The capital, which rises on the left bank of the beautiful and large river of the same name, about twenty miles inland from its mouth, was doubly fortified by the genius of man and by nature. The Dutch had prepared themselves for a vigorous resistance: more than twenty-five pieces of cannon defended the approach to the shore, while, on the ramparts of the city, more than a hundred thirty small arms were ready to rain death. The descent was thus as difficult as it was perilous, and, to overcome these obstacles, it required more than just courage and temerity. But as much as Cassard was a skilled seaman, he was no less a skilled engineer. His knowledge of this art, which he had used not long before for the fortifications of Toulon, were a great help to him in this situation. He showed as well that he had, to a great degree, the sharp eye and the genius of a strategist. Through a series of skillful and bold moves, he was able to elude or overcome the greatest challenges of his mission. With a part of his forces deployed on a point of the island quite far from the mouth of the river, he seized key chokepoints, and put himself in position to strike at the city by land and by sea." (Bescherelle 1895, p. 58)) On the 27th, he departed the colony after securing a promise from the governor for delivery of a ransom consisting of enslaved people, goods, and cash valued at 2.4m French livres, or 747,350 Dutch guilders, equivalent to a full year's production in the colony, or €8.1m in 2018. (Note: "The Dutch defended themselves valiantly, but Cassard's shells so ravaged the city that, foreseeing total ruin if he continued his resistance, the governor sent a parliamentarian to the French captain to offer him a ransom. Cassard accepted this offer and fixed the ransom of Surinam at 2.4m livres, without any restitution for the booty recovered from the plantations that had fallen to French power. This ransom, which represented a year of the colony's revenue, was underwritten and paid without delay. The payment was made in the form of money, sugar, and negroes." (Bescherelle 1895, p. 58))

The following month, Cassard turned to Berbice, briefly occupying the colony. The descendants of Abraham van Peere, the Dutch colony's founder, did not want to pay a ransom to the French to free the colony, which as a result ceded to French control.

After having also sacked Essequibo, yet another colony in Dutch Guiana, Cassard returned again to Martinique to deposit his latest prizes. He did not stay long, setting sail for the island of Sint Eustatius, also colonized by the Dutch. He ransomed this colony in the same way as he had the Dutch landward settlements. (Note: "But the Dutch also had possessions in the Antilles; it was toward these that Cassard intended to finish his expedition. He came first to Sint Eustatius, a colony that rushed to offer a ransom. This time the formidable captain only demanded a very limited sum, because the surrender preceded any attack, and the colony was very poor." (Bescherelle 1895, p. 59))

=== Curaçao ===
Finally, Cassard returned to Surinam to collect his ransom in Paramaribo and then headed toward Curaçao. In 1678, the well-defended island had successfully avoided invasion by a larger fleet led by Jean II d'Estrées that foundered on the Las Aves archipelago. According to a French source, Cassard overcame his officers' objections with a demonstration of his preferred method of attack, and also because Curaçao was richer and more significant than the other colonies already raided—this despite the fact that the official ransom demanded and received in Curaçao was only 600,000 livres, though this may have been supplemented by plunder. Cassard himself was injured in this phase of the expedition. (Note: "Curaçao had already withstood an attack by the admiral Jean II d'Estrées, in 1678, and Cassard's officers sought to avoid an attack that they feared would compromise his reputation and the squadron's profits. The city was strong, defended by a large garrison, and supported by a strong artillery battery. All well capable of besmirching our captain's reputation! Cassard demonstrated to his officers not only that the enterprise was possible, but that success was certain. He declared that Curaçao would pay him a ransom of six hundred thousand livres, and that he wouldn't retire until receiving it. The attack was approved. It started on February 18, 1713 five leagues from the city with a raid on the bay of Saint-Croix, and ended seven days later (the 24th) with the capitulation of the capital, which paid exactly the six hundred thousand livre ransom fixed in advance by the inflexible and obstinate Breton. In Curaçao, as in Surinam, Cassard demonstrated himself to be a resourceful engineer and a consummate warrior, because he needed to follow all the principles of siegecraft and struggle with the difficulties arising from a very rugged terrain. In effect, across the five leagues which separated his landing zone from the city, he had to navigated passages that were dangerous and well-defended, take several advance posts in pitched battle, and overtake formidable enemy emplacements. He was required to portage artillery over thousands of natural obstacles, dig trenches, raise batteries, and attack and defend at the same time. Cassard, who was up to the challenges, and was always to be found at the most dangerous part of the line, received, during one of the many engagements he had to support, a terrible injury to his food, which didn't prevent him from continuing to give orders and ensure their execution. He returned once more to Martinique to recover from his injury, settle the accounts of the freebooters who had been so helpful to him, and prepare for his return to France with the gains from his exploits, which were estimated to be at least nine or ten million." (Bescherelle 1895, pp. 59–60))

The Cassard expedition to Cape Verde and the Caribbean was successful, and after another stopover at Martinique, Cassard returned to France with prizes in the form of cash, goods, and enslaved Africans whose net value was estimated at nine to ten million livres.

== Aftermath ==
=== France ===
Thanks to his exploits, Jacques Cassard was named Knight of the Order of Saint Louis on his return to France. From 1713, he focused his efforts on lawsuits relating to the plunder. Eleven ships of the French Navy have been named for him.

=== Cape Verde ===
In Cape Verde, Ribiera Grande was slowly replaced as capital of the Portuguese colony by Praia, due to the latter settlement's strategic position farther east and on a plateau, giving it better natural protection against pirate attacks. This move, initially ordered by King Philip II of Portugal on August 14, 1712, was implemented gradually, and not complete until 1770.

=== Antilles ===
In the Americas, the 1713 Peace of Utrecht, which shrank navies as it ended the War of the Spanish Succession, put a temporary end to the privations of French corsairs and large-scale naval raids fortified by freebooters like the Cassard expedition, capable of sacking even the largest colonies. As a result, there was a resurgence in the Golden Age of Piracy as "fully illegal" independent pirate captains took on unemployed sailors and focused on commerce raiding and smuggling.

=== Berbice ===
An Amsterdam-based consortium consisting of the brothers Nicolaas and Hendrik van Hoorn, Arnold Dix, Pieter Schuurmans, and Cornelis van Peere paid the ransom of ƒ180,000 in cash and ƒ120,000 in sugar and enslaved people on October 24, 1714, thereby returning Berbice to Dutch control, and acquiring the colony for themselves. In 1720, the colony's five new owners founded the Society of Berbice, akin to the Society of Suriname which governed the neighbouring colony, to raise more capital for the colony. The Society was a public company listed on the Amsterdam Stock Exchange. While economic activity in Berbice now increased as compared to the Van Peere years, the Society of Berbice paid smaller Dividends than similar corporations, and continued underinvestment led to supply shortages which, when exacerbated by the Seven Years' War, led to hunger among the enslaved population, a contributing factor to the 1763 Berbice slave uprising.

=== Surinam ===
There was an uptick in marronage in Surinam during the period of Cassard's expedition. Some plantations let their enslaved population enter the forests to avoid capture, an opportunity some took not to return. Other Africans escaped almost immediately after disembarking in the colony, joining bands of Maroons in the interior. Escapees from plantation Vreedenburg and escapees from recently-landed Slave ships joined the Saamaka Maroons who eventually settled on the Upper Suriname River and made peace with the colonial government in 1762. They preserve the memory of their ancestors' escape in their oral history.

In 1715, Fort Sommelsdijk was strengthened to protect plantations in the region. The fort was located up the Commewijne River (itself the Suriname River's northernmost tributary) at the mouth of the Cottica. As there was still need to further fortify Paramaribo, which had never successfully repelled an invasion, it was decided to build another fort closer to Meerzorg above the confluence of the Suriname and the Commewijne. Fort Nieuw-Amsterdam was finished in 1747, and Fort Sommelsdijk was downgraded to an outpost.

The effort entailed in provisioning and financing the ransom demanded by Cassard was a heavy burden on the Sephardic Jewish community of Surinam, which owned a third of the colony's plantations in the early eighteenth century. As such, it was a contributing factor to the century-long decline of plantations with Jewish owners, who slowly relocated the seat of their operations from Jodensavanne to Paramaribo, where they integrated more closely with the rest of the colony's European population. In the early 19th century, the remains of Jodensavanne were destroyed in a Maroon raid.

== Bibliography ==
- Beyerman, J. J. (1934). "De Nederlandsche Kolonie Berbice in 1771". Nieuwe West-Indische Gids (in Dutch). 15 (1): 313–317. doi:10.1163/22134360-90001004.
- Buddingh', Hans (1999). Geschiedenis van Suriname. Utrecht: Het Spectrum.
- Hartsinck, J.J. (1770), Beschryving van Guiana, of de wilde kust in Zuid-America, Amsterdam: Gerrit Tielenburg
- Netscher, Pieter Marinus (1888). Geschiedenis van de koloniën Essequebo, Demerary en Berbice, van de vestiging der Nederlanders aldaar tot op onzen tijd (in Dutch). The Hague: Martinus Nijhoff.
- Norman, Charles Boswell. The corsairs of France. pp. 139–150.
- Price, Richard (1983). First-time: The Historical Vision of an Afro-American People. Baltimore: Johns Hopkins University Press. ISBN 9780801829857.
- Rodway, James (May 2009). History of British Guiana. Read Books. ISBN 9781444635089.
- Statham, Edward Phillips (2011). "XV "Jacques Cassard"". Privateers and Privateering. Cambridge University Press. pp. 229–240. ISBN 9781108026291.
