= Cassipora =

- Village
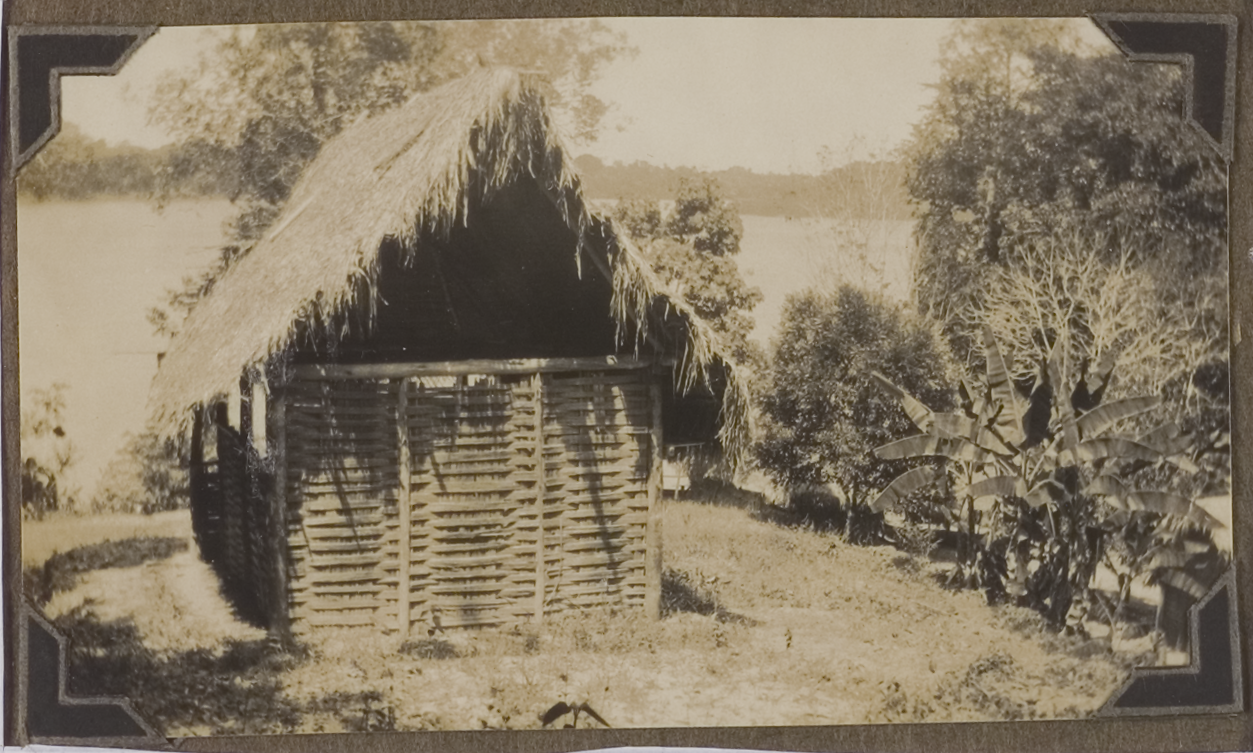
- Cassipora (c. 1935)

- Location within Suriname
- Coordinates: 5.395833°N 54.94°W
- Country: Suriname
- District: Para District
- Resort: Carolina

Government
  - Captain: Muriël Fernandes (2011)

Population (2022)
  - Total: 250
- Time zone: UTC-3 (AST)

Cassipora is an Indigenous village of Lokono Amerindians located in the resort of Carolina in the Para District of Suriname. The village is situated near the Blaka Watra recreation area. It is also close to a 17th-century Jewish village; however, only the cemetery remains from that period.

== History ==
Cassipora is located near a former Jewish settlement established in 1665, which was abandoned twenty years later in favour of neighbouring Jodensavanne. During the 19th century, the wood plantation Salem was located at the site. The village consists of small clusters of houses occupied by one family, which are spaced far apart.

Cassipora is connected to the water supply and has been linked to the electricity grid since 2016. The village also has access to mobile phone services. However, for schooling and healthcare services, it relies on neighbouring Redi Doti, which can be reached by an unpaved road. Unfortunately, there is a conflict with logging companies that also use this road.

Since 2011, the village chief of Cassipora has been Muriël Fernandes, who was first elected at the age of 29. The village's economy is primarily based on subsistence farming, hunting, and tourism. Since 2002, the village has owned the Blaka Watra resort.

== Blaka Watra ==
Blaka Watra is a creek with very dark, near black water. Former Prime minister Johan Adolf Pengel built his country residence near the creek. Artificial rapids were constructed in the creek to give the impression of a bubble bath. In 1970, after his death, it was turned into a public recreation area. During the Surinamese Interior War it was the scene of heavy fighting. It has been restored, and regained its status as a recreation area.

== Cassipora Cemetery ==
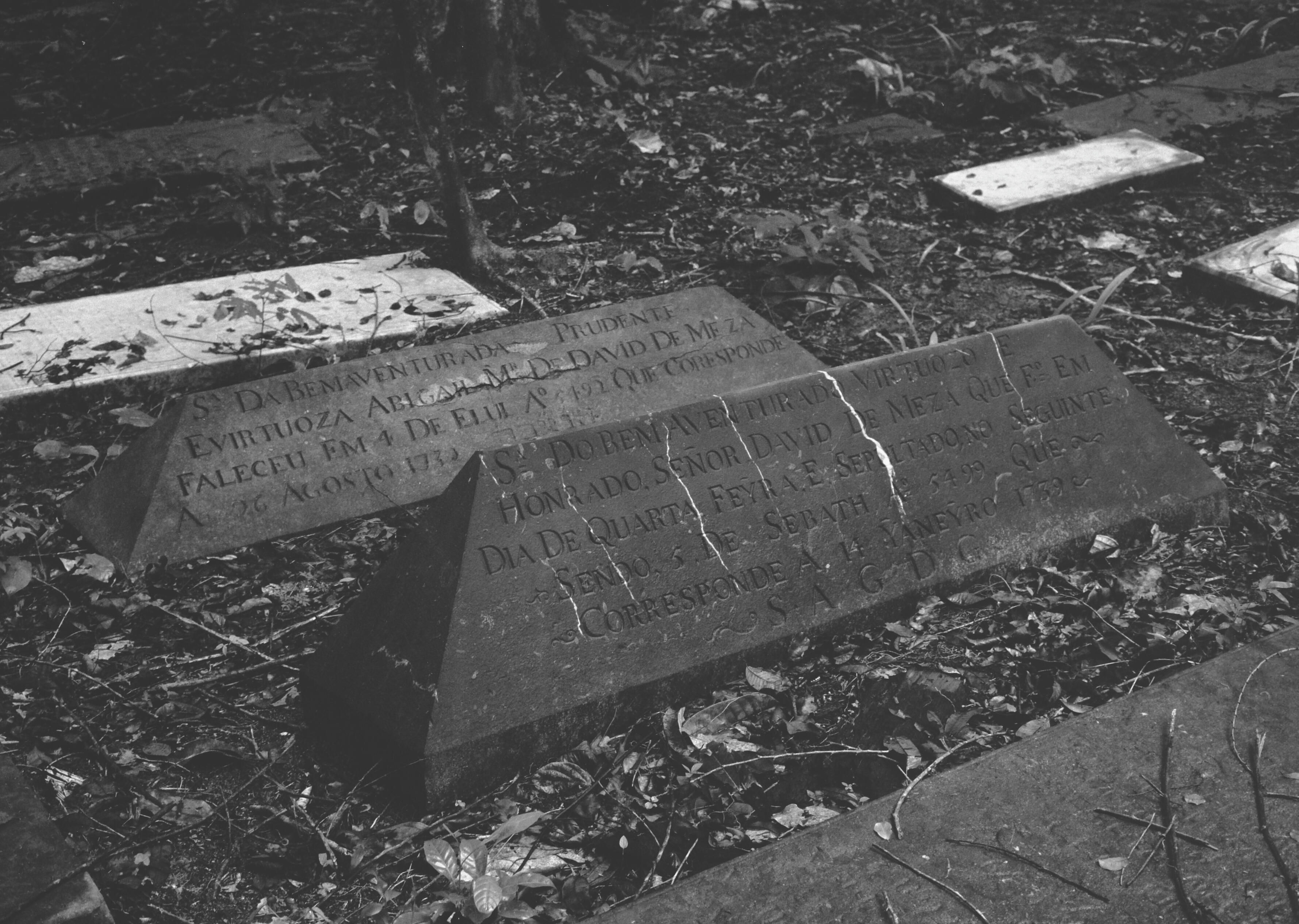
Gravestones at Cassipora

In 1671, a synagogue was built in Cassipora, however all traces of the building have disappeared, and only the graves remain. Together with Jodensavanne, the cemetery is on the tentative list for the Unesco World Heritage List since 1998. During World War II, the Jodensavanne internment camp was established to intern political prisoners from the Dutch East Indies. One of the tasks of the prisoners was clearing the forest, and repairing the graves at Cassipora. The cemetery contains several hundred graves, and the oldest dates from 1667.
