= Carolina, Suriname =

Coordinates: 5°27′0″N 54°59′49″W

Carolina
- Resort
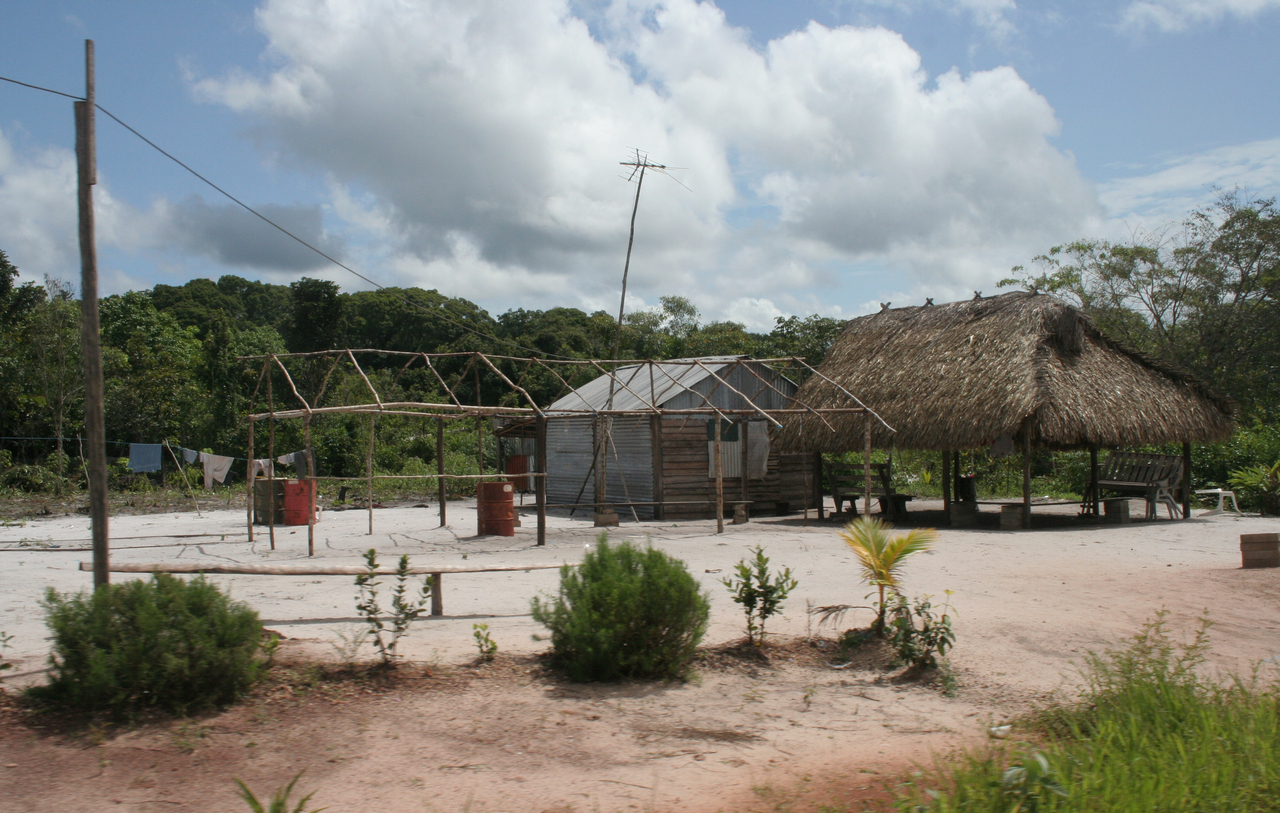
- Village on the road to Jodensavanne

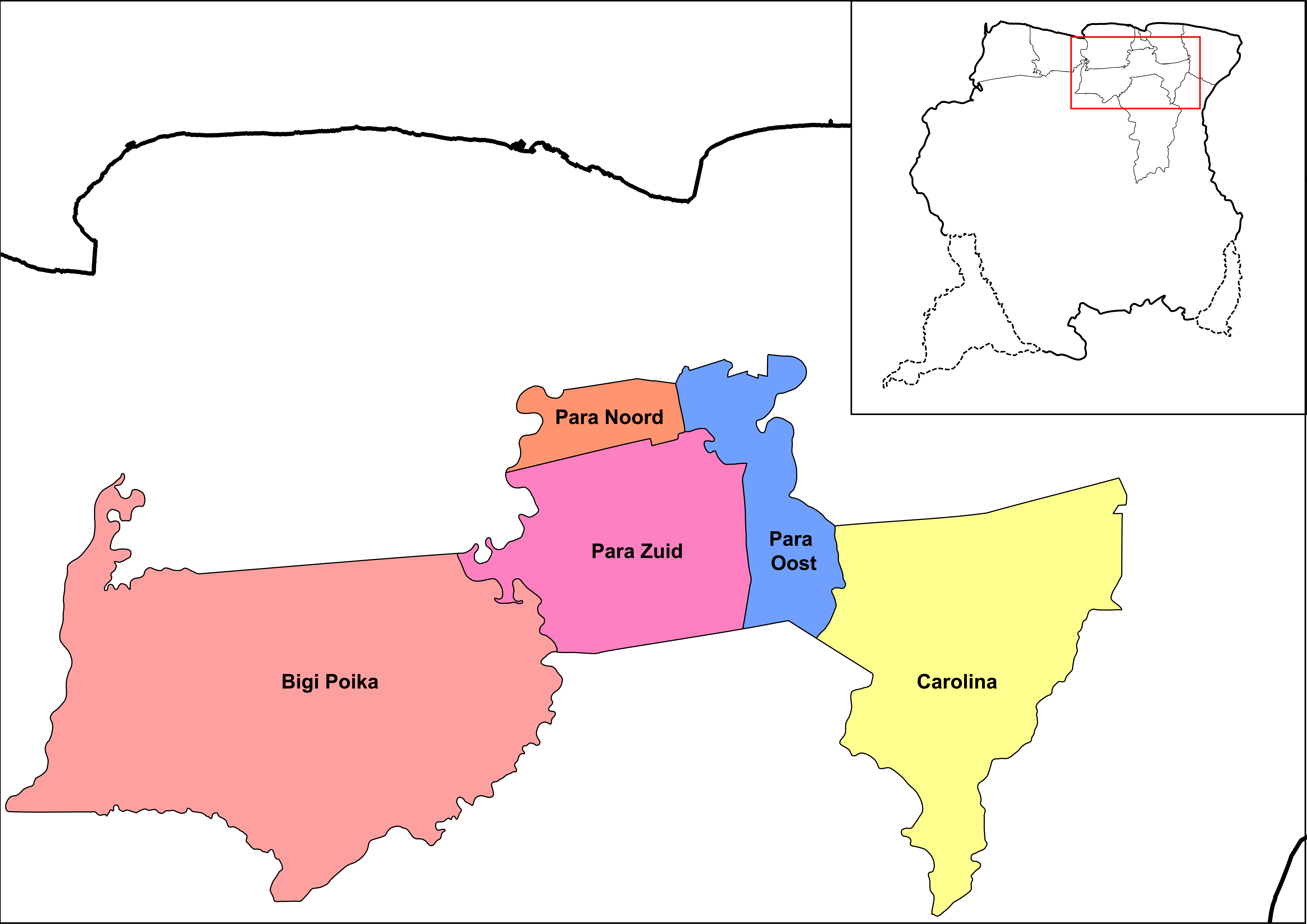
- Map showing the resorts of Para District. Carolina
- Country: Suriname
- District: Para District

Area
  - Total: 1,441 km^{2} (556 sq mi)
- Elevation: 20 m (66 ft)

Population (2012)
  - Total: 343
  - Density: 0.238/km^{2} (0.616/sq mi)
- Time zone: UTC-3 (AST)

Carolina is a resort in Suriname, located in the Para District. Its population at the 2012 census was 343. Most of the inhabitants are indigenous.

== Settlements ==
The resort is home to the settlement of Jodensavanne, a Jewish autonomous area which was settled from 1652 onwards, and abandoned after a fire in 1832.

The village of Redi Doti (also Redidoti) is located near the site of Jodensavanne. The village has been founded in 1930, and is home to an indigenous population of about 100 people of mixed Carib and Arowak background.

Blaka Watra is a creek with very dark, near black water. Former Prime minister Johan Adolf Pengel built his country residence near the creek. The site was opened to the public in 1970, and became an important recreation area. During the Surinamese Interior War it was the scene of heavy fighting. It has been restored, and regained its status as a recreation area. Blaka Watra is located near the indigenous village Cassipora.

The Ndyuka people used to have five settlements on the Commewijne River. The most important were Java and Peninica. The villages were deserted during the Surinamese Interior War, and as of 2018, have very few permanent residents.

== Transport ==
The resort Carolina is connected with the Avobakaweg to Paramaribo via the Carolinabrug. The bridge used to be located in the village of Carolina, however it was damaged, and new bridge has been built near Red Doti in 2014. The road used to continue to Snesiekondre on the Marowijne River, however the bridge over the Commewijne River near Java had been destroyed during the war, and has not been rebuilt.
