= Jacques Cassard =

French naval officer and privateer

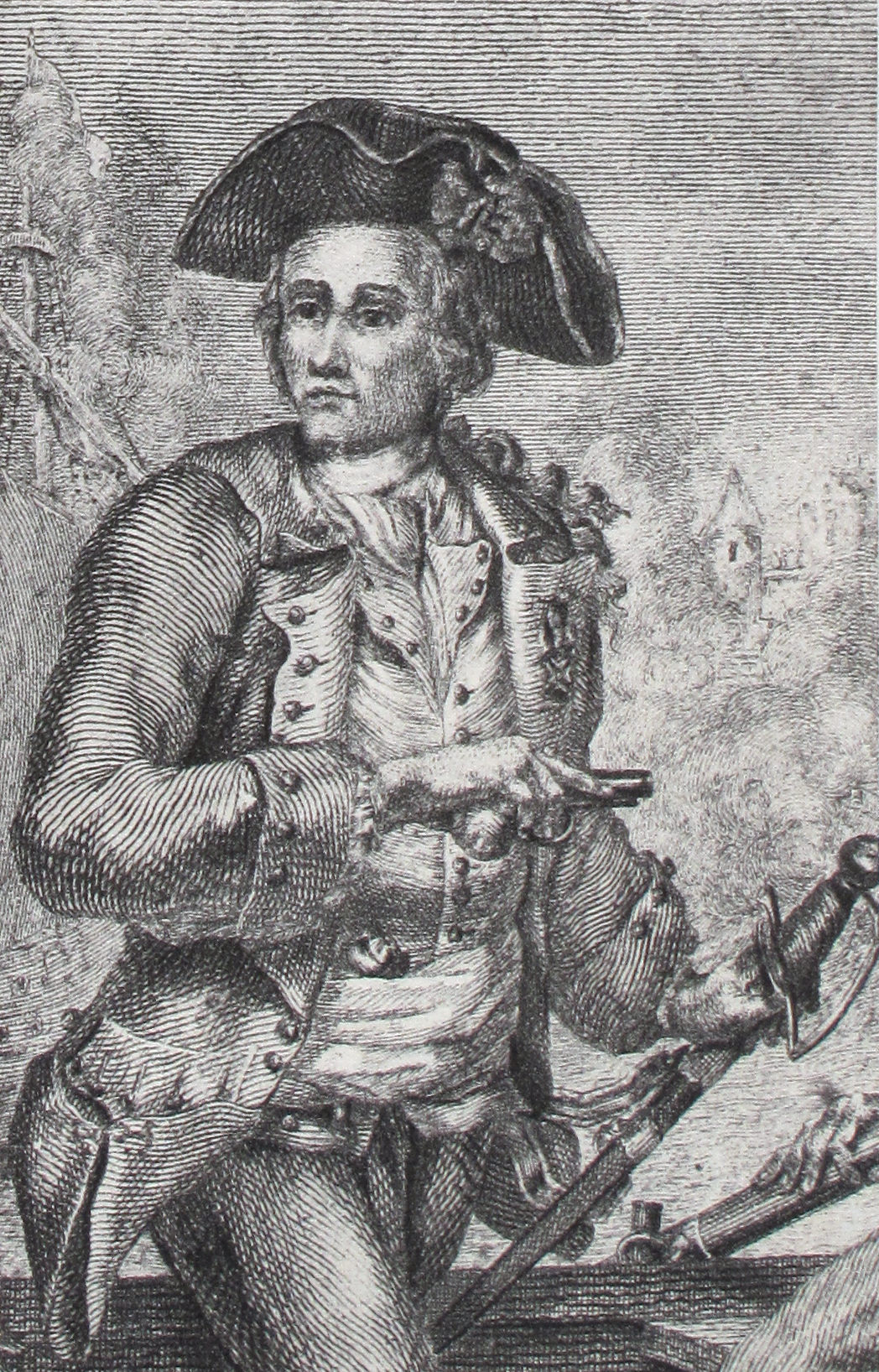
- An illustration of Cassard
- Born: 30 September 1679; Nantes, Province of Brittany, France
- Died: 1740 (aged 60–61); Ham, France
- Occupations: Naval officer and privateer
- Years active: 1697-1731
- Notable work: Capture of Meerzorg

Jacques Cassard (30 September 1679 – 1740) was a French naval officer and privateer.

== Biography ==
Born on 30 September 1679 to a family of merchants of Nantes, Cassard began a career as a sailor at age 14 on the merchantmen owned by his family. In January 1697, he joined the French Navy on bombship Éclatante. In 1700, Cassard became a merchantman captain. The next year, the War of the Spanish Succession broke out, and Cassard converted to a privateer. In 1705, he captained the privateer Saint Guillaume, capturing 12 merchantmen and raiding Cork. Two years later, he captured 13 merchantmen with the Duchesse Anne, earning a rank in the Navy. In 1709, Cassard, promoted to Commander, was tasked to escort a 25-ship food convoy on the 68-gun Éclatant. On 29 April, supported by Sérieux, he defeated five English ships, allowing the convoy to safely reach Marseille.

The next year, Cassard lead a squadron comprising the 74-gun Parfait, the 58-gun Sérieux and the 50-gun Phénix and the 60-gun Sirène, with his flag on Parfait. He was tasked to escort an 84-ship convoy inbound from Smyrna that had become blockaded at Syracuse by a British fleet. He captured HMS Pembroke, while Sérieux secured the surrender of the 32-gun HMS Falcon in the 9 November Battle of Syracuse. The convoy reach Toulon. In 1711, Cassard again secured the way for a 43-ship convoy bound for Pensacola. In December 1711, Cassard obtained the command of a 6-ship squadron and embarked on an expedition in which he raided English, Dutch and Portuguese colonies in Cape Verde and in the Caribbean.

On 10 October 1712, Cassard captured the plantation of Meerzorg in Suriname for France, and threatened Paramaribo across the Suriname River. Negotiations started, and on 27 October Cassard left with ƒ747,350 (€8.1 million in 2018) worth of goods and slaves. After the Treaty of Utrecht and the end of the war in 1713, Cassard started numerous trials to obtain payments.

Cassard retired in 1731. In 1736, he was declared insane after insulting the Cardinal de Fleury, and detained in Ham, where he died four years later.

== Honours ==
- Knight of the Order of Saint Louis (1719)
- Numerous ships of the French Navy named Cassard after him
- A Sea scout group (Scouts et Guides de France) is named after him in Nantes

== See also ==
- Cassard expedition
