= Mosque Keizerstraat =

Mosque in Paramaribo, Suriname

- Moskee Keizerstraat
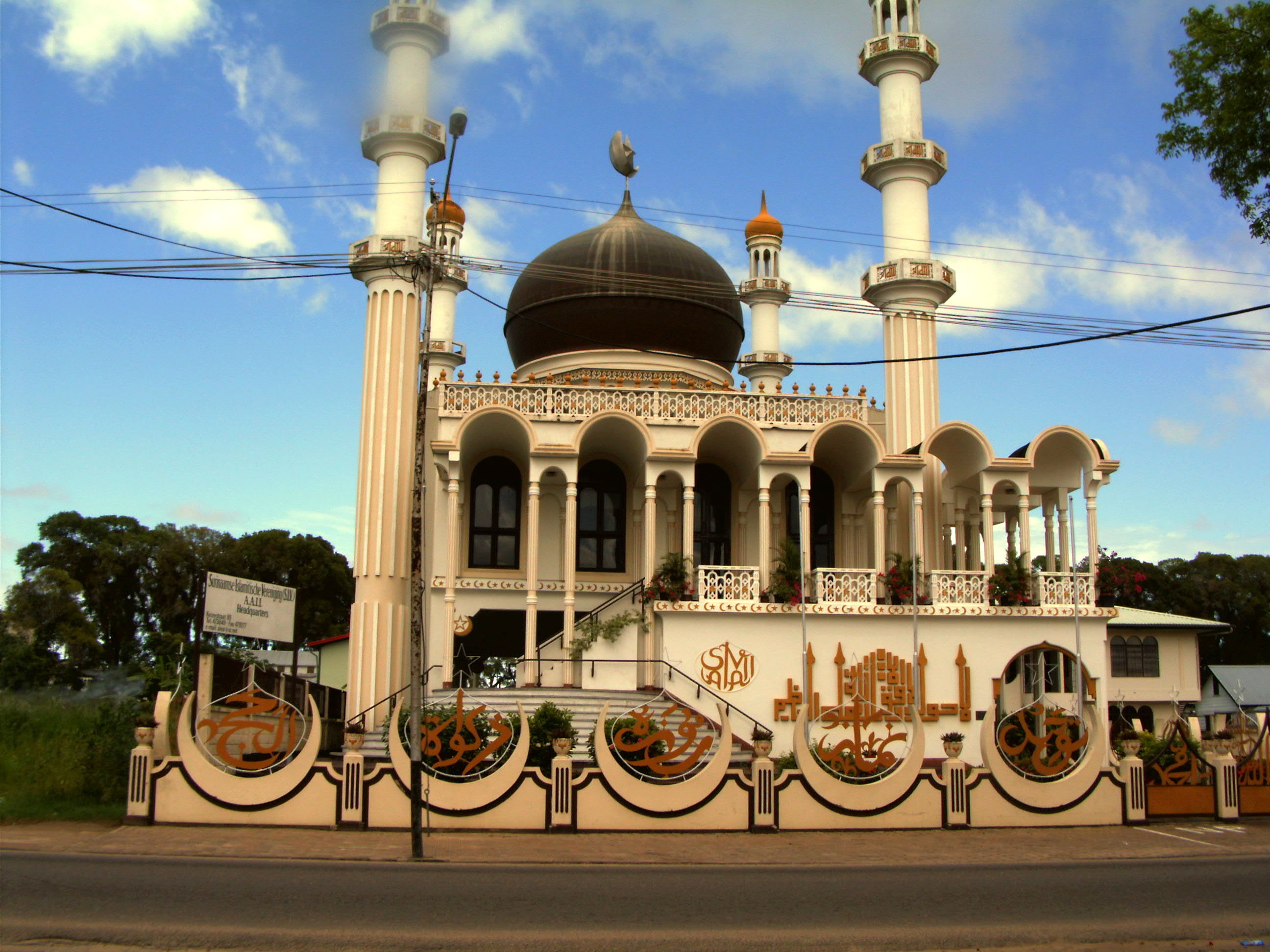

- Location of the mosque in Suriname

Religion
- Affiliation: Ahmadiyya Islam
- Ecclesiastical or organisational status: Mosque
- Ownership: Lahore Ahmadiyya Movement
- Status: Active

Location
- Location: Keizerstraat, Paramaribo
- Country: Suriname
- Interactive map of Mosque Keizerstraat
- Coordinates: 5°49′43″N 55°09′35″W

Architecture
- Type: Mosque
- Established: 1932
- Completed: 1984

Specifications
- Dome: 1
- Minaret: 2

The Mosque Keizerstraat (Dutch: Moskee Keizerstraat), officially known as the Ahmadiyya Anjuman Isha’at Islam Mosque Keizerstraat, is a mosque and the headquarters of the Lahore Ahmadiyya Movement (Surinaamse Islamitische Vereniging), located in Paramaribo, Suriname. The mosque is situated in the Keizerstraat, adjacent to the Neveh Shalom Synagogue.

== History ==
The Muslim community of Paramaribo was established in 1929. Its first mosque, a wooden rectangular building with minarets, was completed in 1932. In 1979 boxing legend Muhammad Ali visited the mosque.

The current mosque was completed in 1984.

The construction of this mosque is part of the Ahmadiyya community's policy of expanding Islam. Its founder, Mirza Ghulam Ahmad, aimed to replicate the missionary activities carried out by Christian denominations in India during his time. Therefore, many of the first mosques built in Western countries belong to this sect of Islam—although, for the majority of Muslims, they would not be considered part of Islam.

== See also ==
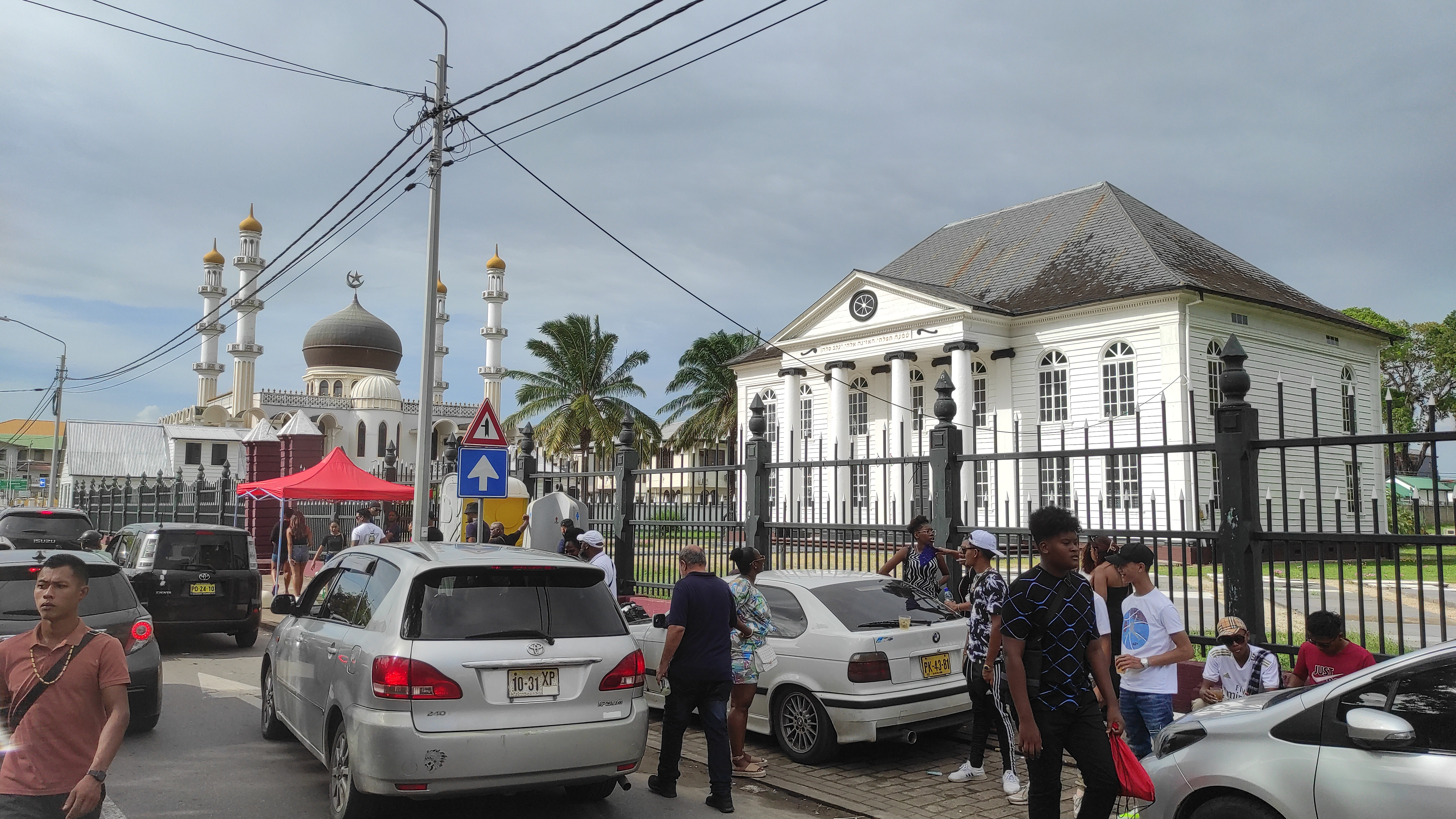
Mosque Keizerstraat and the adjacent Neveh Shalom Synagogue

- Islam in Suriname
- List of mosques in the Americas
