= Keizerstraat, Paramaribo =

Coordinates: 5.82833°N 55.1594°W

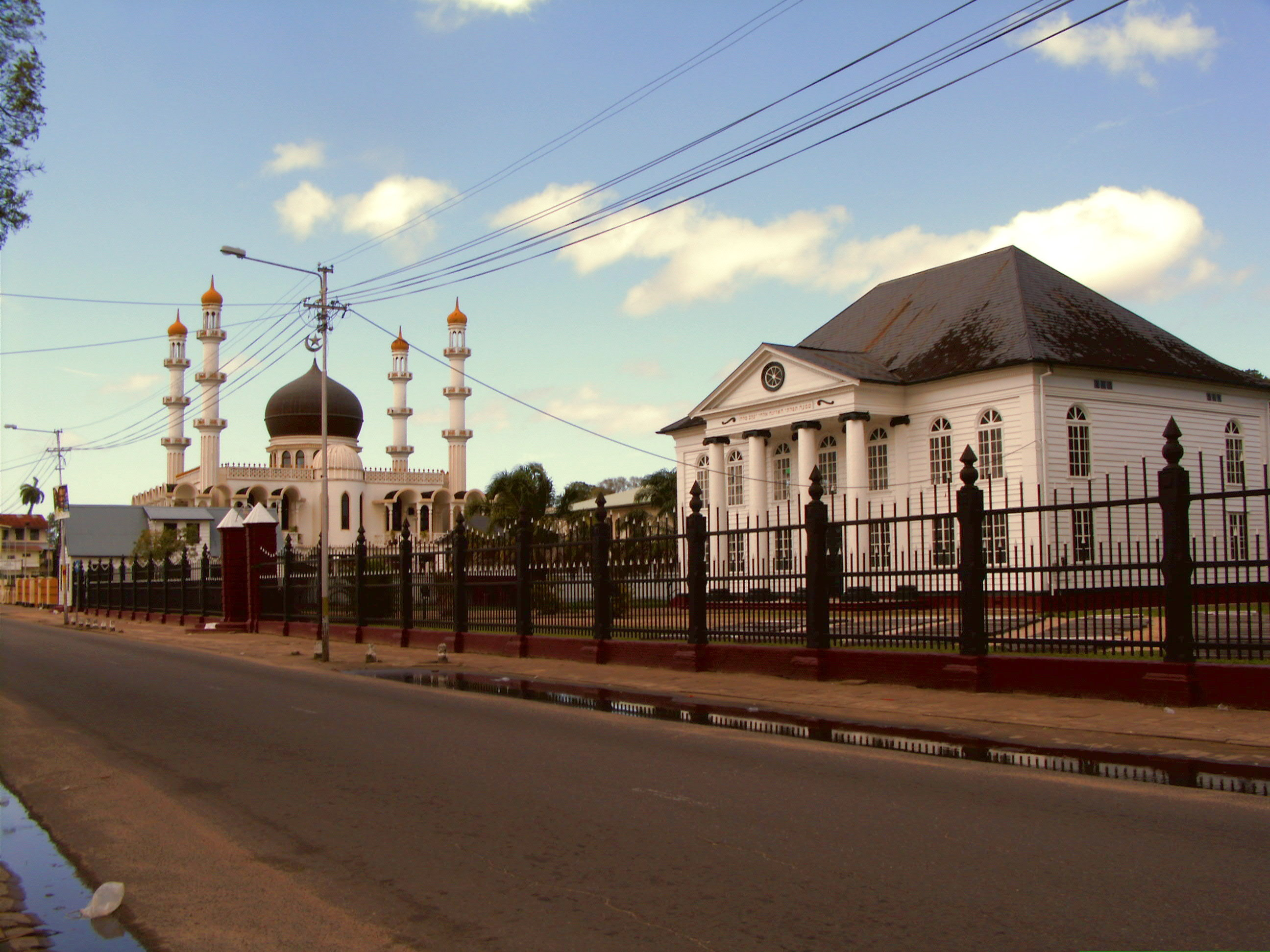
The Neveh Shalom Synagogue and Ahmadiyya Anjuman Isha’at Islam Mosque on the Keizerstraat

The Keizerstraat is a long street in the center of Paramaribo, best known for its Neveh Shalom Synagogue and Ahmadiyya Anjuman Isha’at Islam Mosque that are adjacent to each other. This proximity is often perceived to symbolize the peaceful coexistence of religious communities in Suriname.

The Keizerstraat is predominantly commercial near the Suriname River, turning more residential as one advances to the northeast, changing its name in Verlengde Keizerstraat (Extended Keizerstraat), before ending near a cluster of cemeteries. In addition to the two famous houses of worship, on the street are also the police bureau for central Paramaribo, the Keizerstraat Mall, and the Paramaribo branch of McDonald's.
