= Neveh Shalom Synagogue =

Reform synagogue in Paramaribo, Suriname

- Hebrew: בית הכנסת נווה שלום; Dutch: Synagoge Neve Shalom
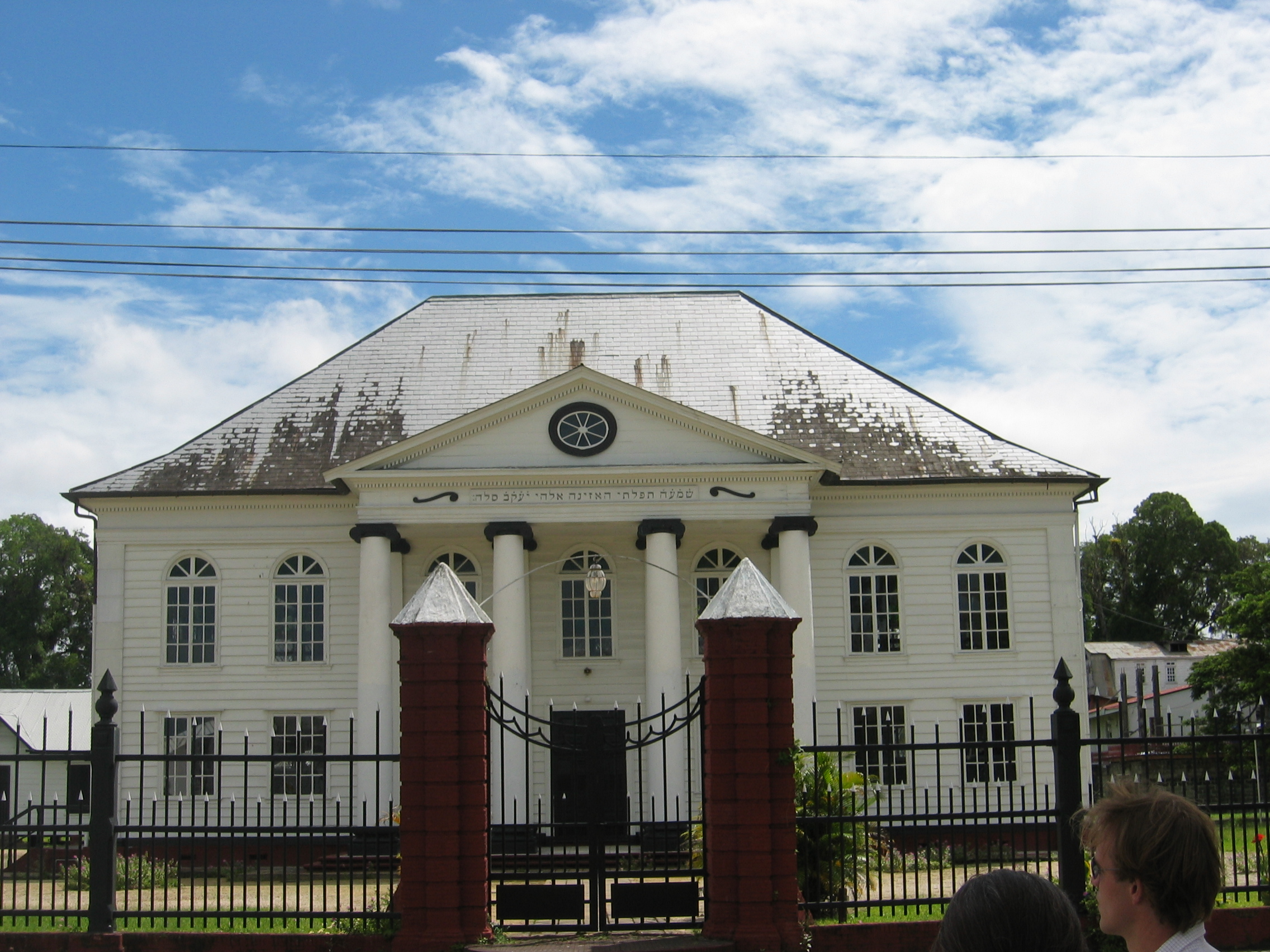
- The synagogue exterior, in 2006

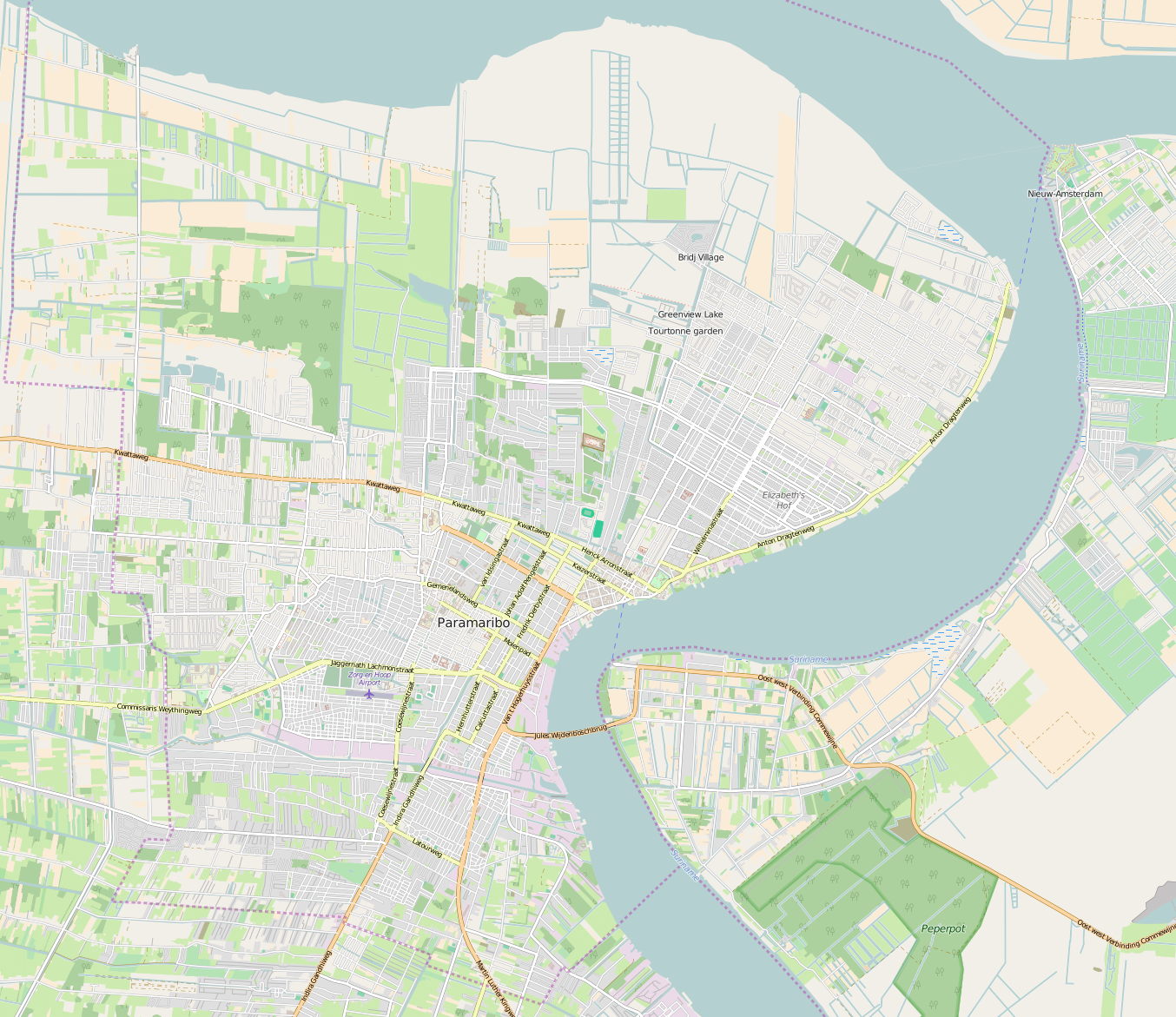
- Location of the synagogue in Paramaribo

Religion
- Affiliation: Reform Judaism
- Rite: Nusach Ashkenaz
- Ecclesiastical or organizational status: Synagogue
- Ownership: Israëlitische Gemeente Suriname
- Year consecrated: 1665
- Status: Active

Location
- Location: Keizerstraat 82, Paramaribo, Suriname
- Interactive map of Neveh Shalom Synagogue
- Coordinates: 5°49′42.2″N 55°9′33.2″W

Architecture
- Architect: Jan Francois Halfhide (1842)
- Type: Synagogue architecture
- Style: Neoclassical
- Completed: 1723 (first building); 1842 (current building)

Website
- surinamejewishcommunity.com

The Neveh Shalom Synagogue (Hebrew: בית הכנסת נווה שלום, lit. 'House of Peace'; Dutch: Synagoge Neve Shalom) is a Reform Jewish congregation and synagogue, located in Paramaribo, Suriname. The congregation was established as an Orthodox community who worshipped in the Ashkenazi rite.

== History ==
The lot on Keizerstraat 82 was acquired in 1716 by Sephardi Jews. The original building was completed in 1723. The first Surinamese synagogue was located in the Jodensavanne, originally built of wood between 1665 and 1671 (but already rebuilt with bricks), however many had moved to Paramaribo. Originally, the synagogue was for both the Ashkenazim and the Sephardim community. The synagogue was sold to the Ashkenazim in 1735, and the Sephardim formed a separate community known as Tzedek ve-Shalom. The two communities have merged in the 1990s, and hold services in alternating buildings and alternating rites.

The current synagogue on the Keizerstraat 82 lot, designed by architect J.F. Halfhide, was completed in 1842. Construction started on 3 July 1835 in the presence of Prince Henry of the Netherlands. The chronogram on its pediment reads 5597 AM, 1836/7 CE.

The synagogue contains a small museum about the history of the Jews in Suriname.

Over the years the synagogue has transitioned from Orthodox to Liberal, accepting interfaith couples and non-Jews.

The Mosque Keizerstraat is adjacent to the synagogue.

== Gallery ==
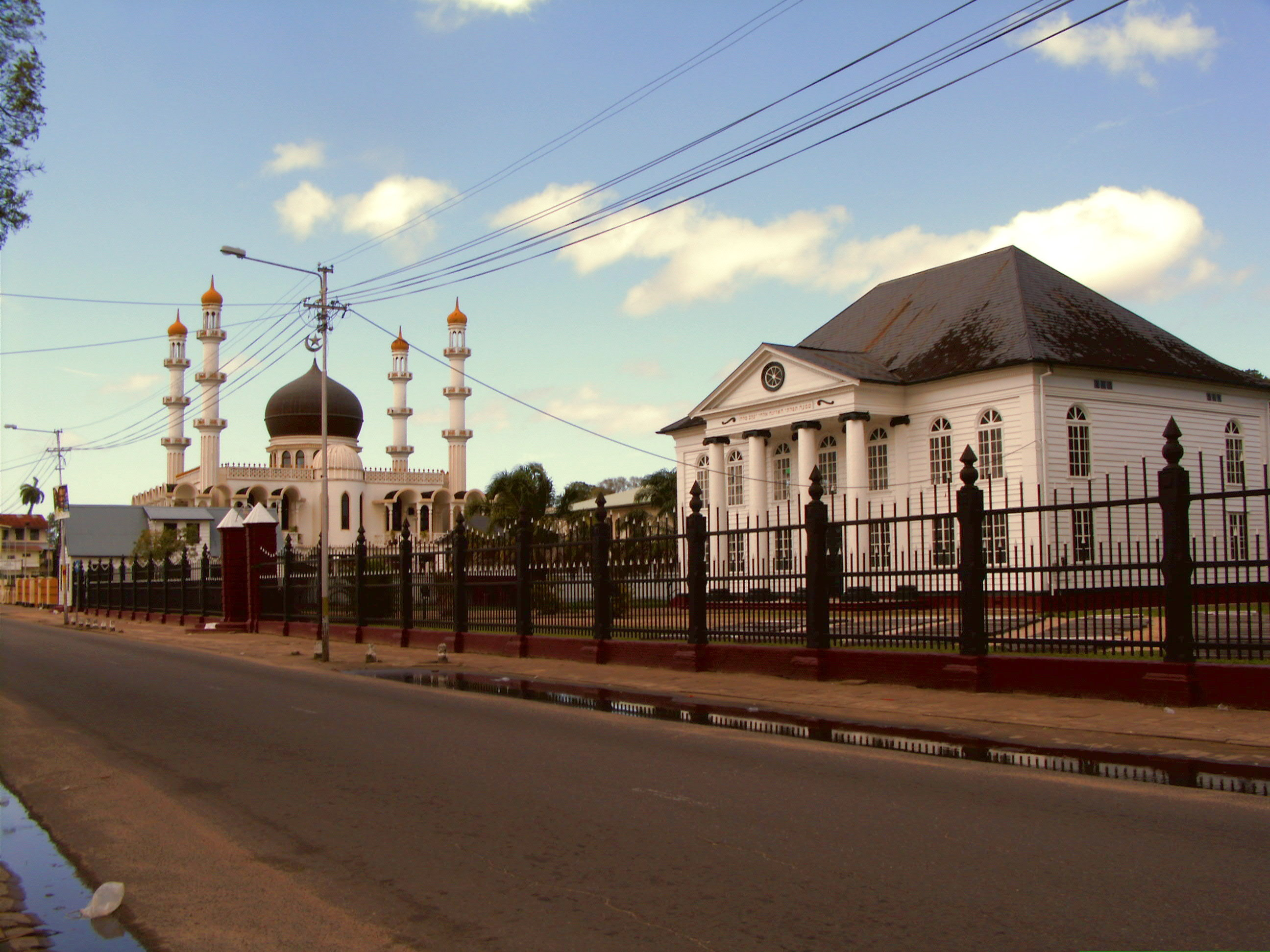
Neveh Shalom Synagogue next to the Mosque Keizerstraat

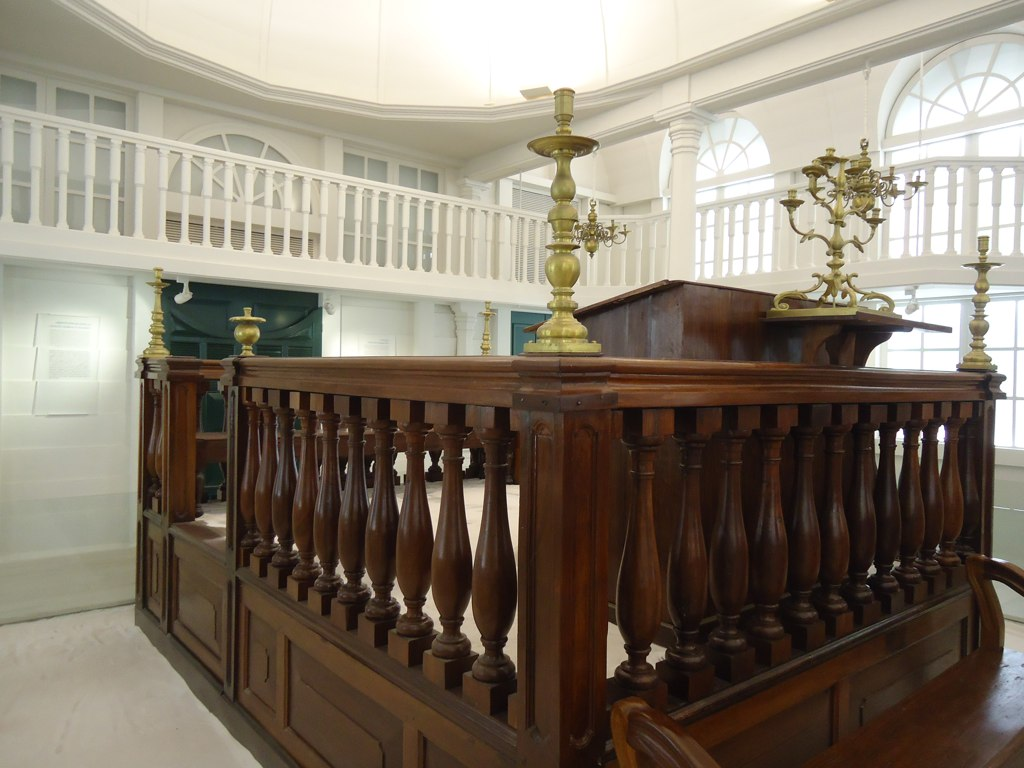

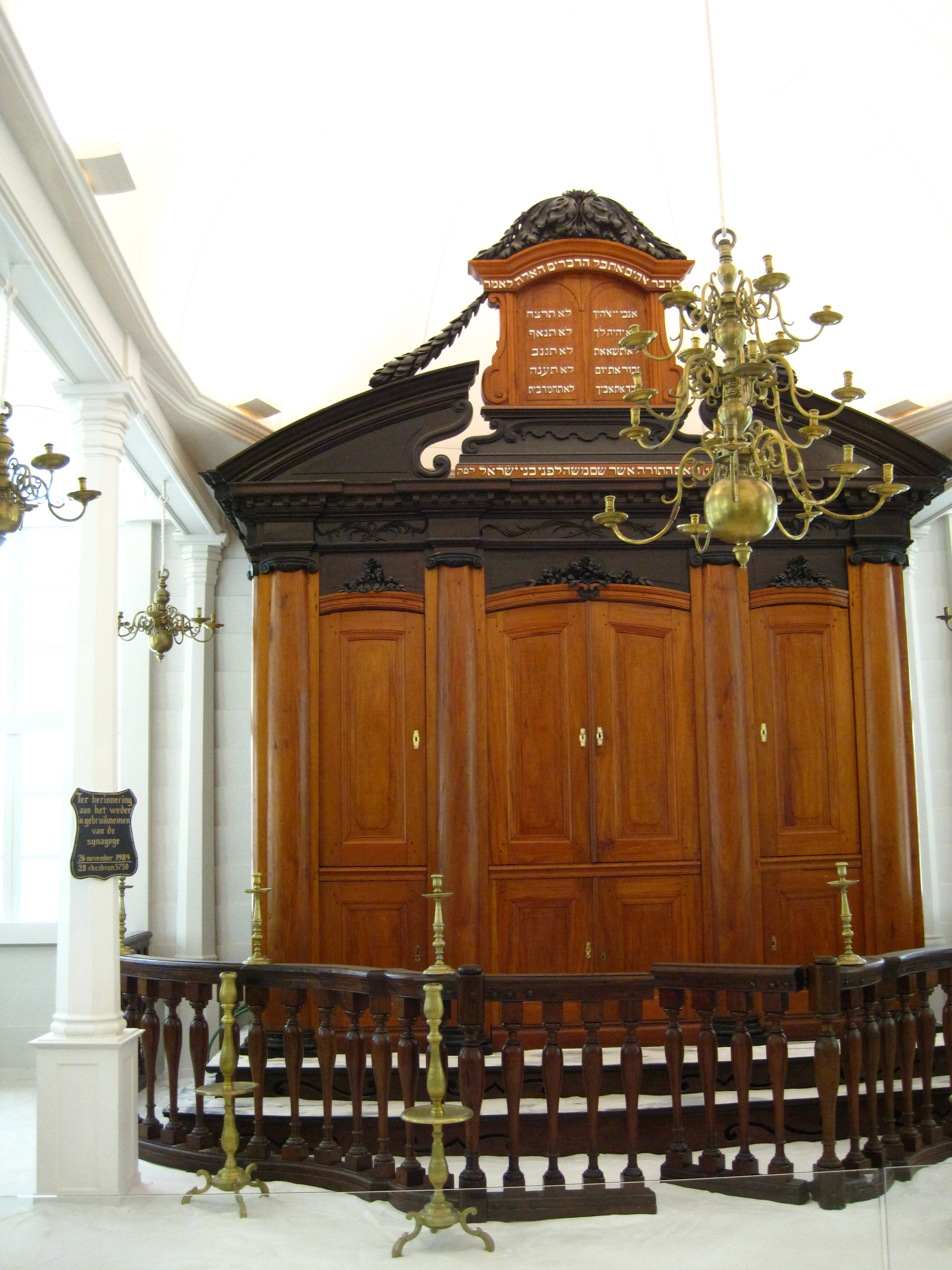

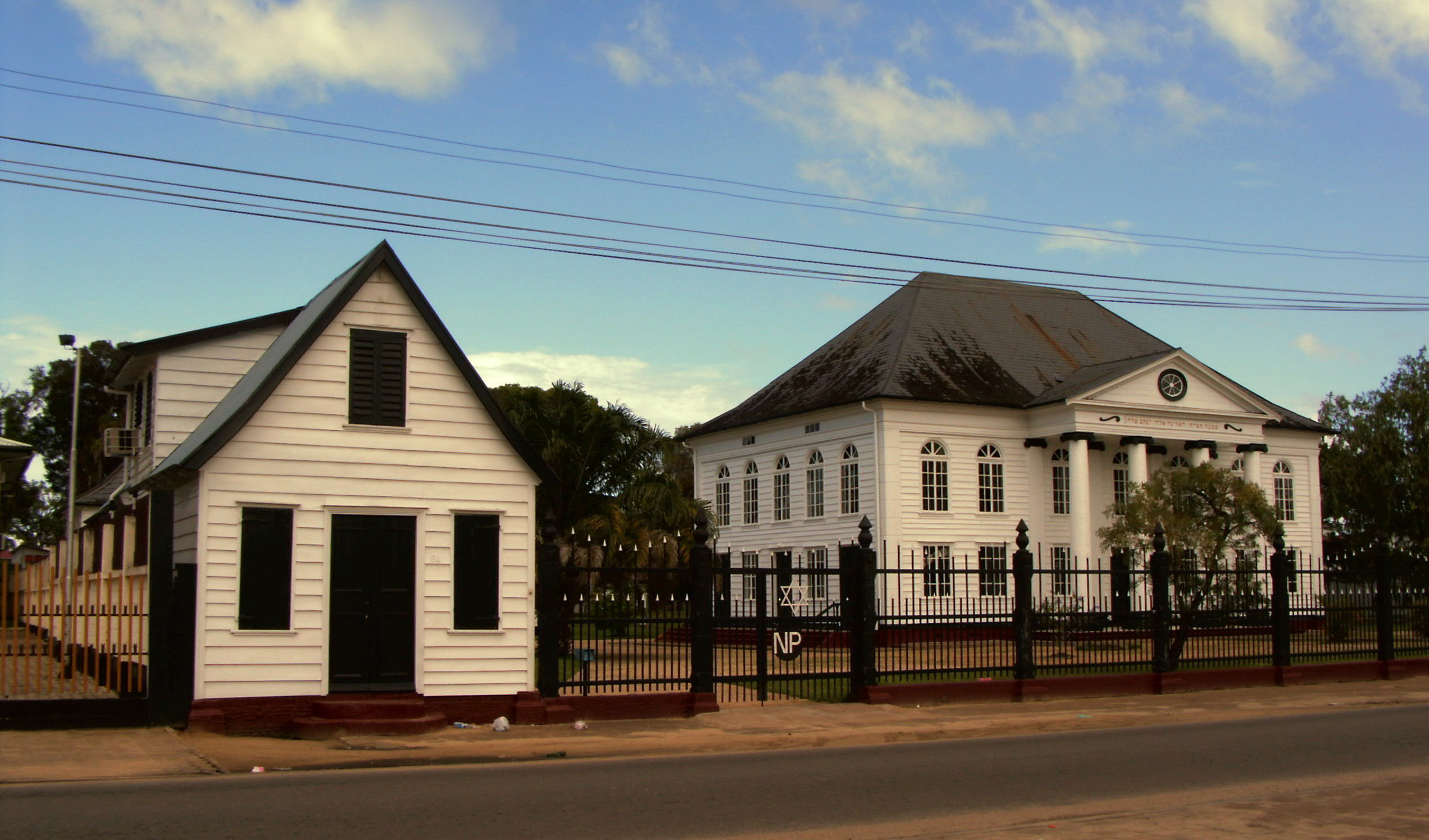

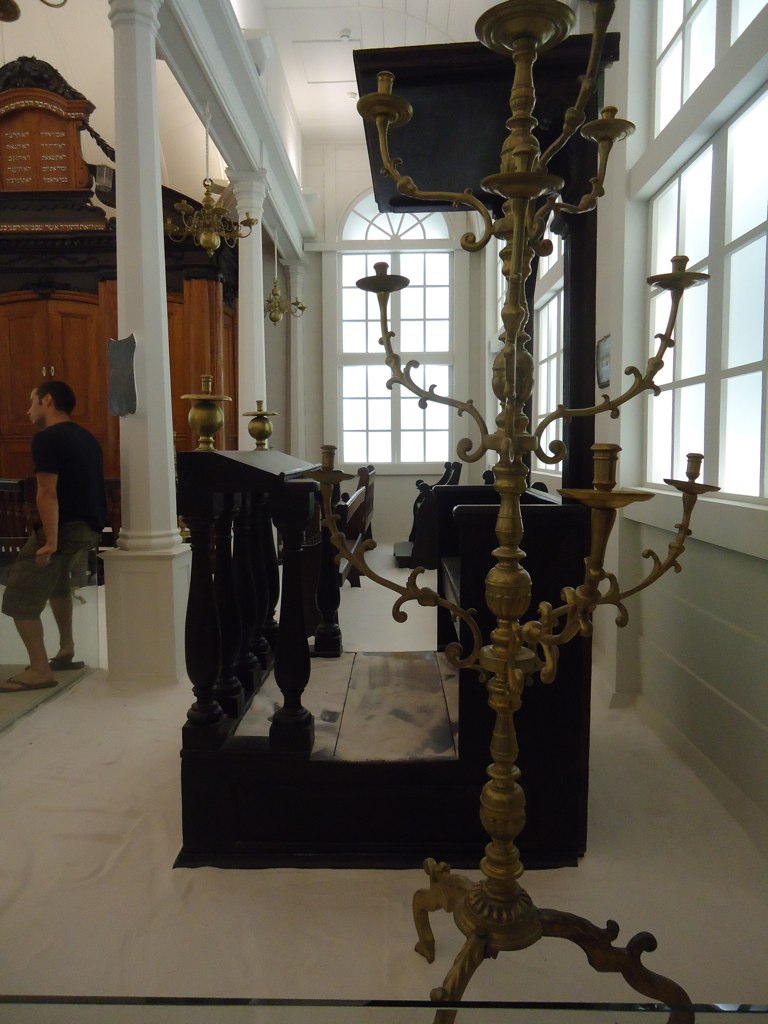

== See also ==
- History of the Jews in Suriname
- List of synagogues in Suriname
