= Redi Doti =

- Village
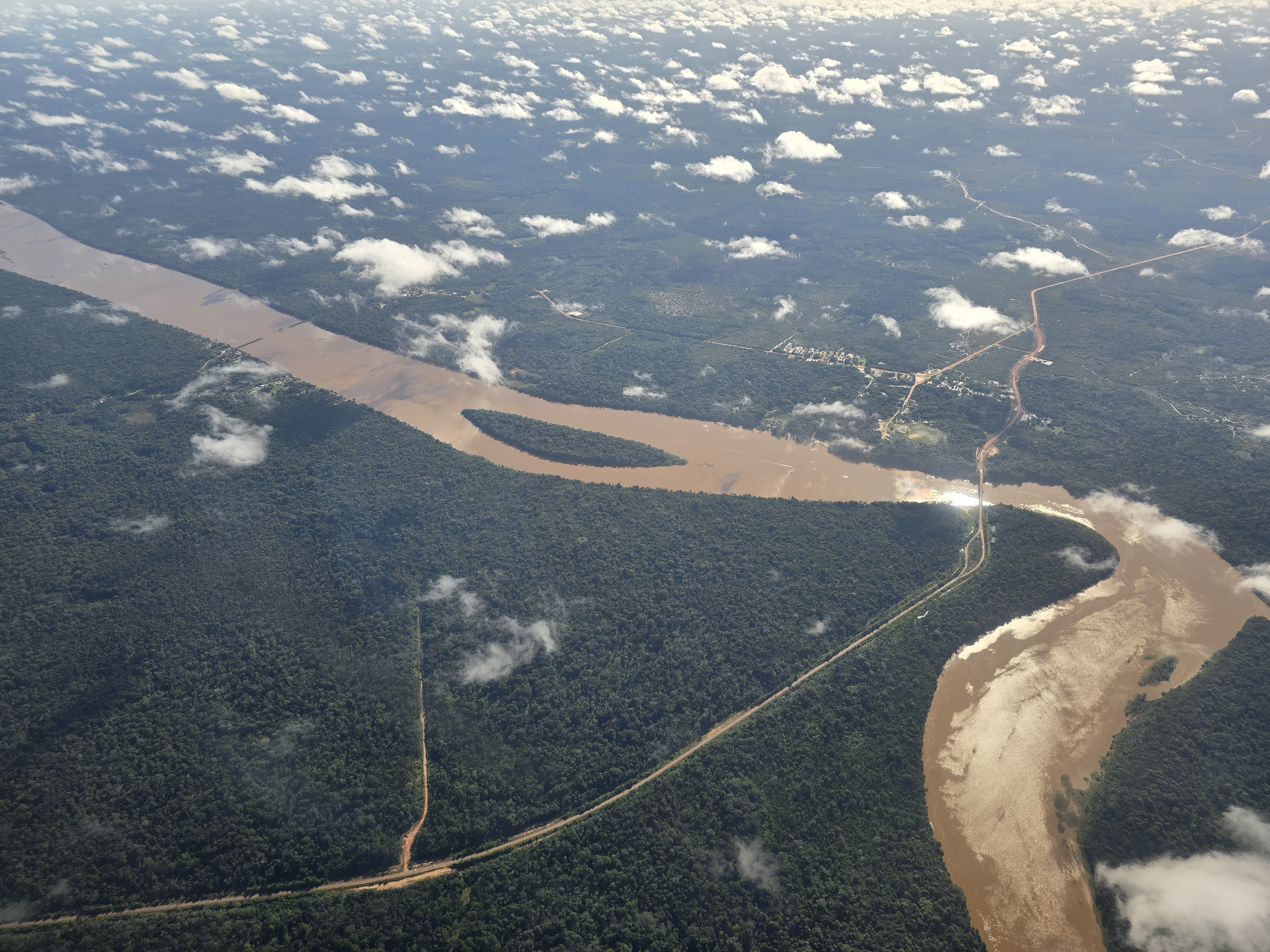

- Location within Suriname
- Coordinates: 5.425278°N 54.976389°W
- Country: Suriname
- District: Para District
- Resort: Carolina

Government
  - Captain: Marchano Stuger (2019)

Population (2022)
  - Total: 230
- Time zone: UTC-3 (AST)

Redi Doti (also Redidoti) is an Indigenous village of Lokono and Kalina Amerindians in the resort of Carolina in the Para District in Suriname. The village is located near the site of Jodensavanne.

== History ==
The village of Redi Doti was officially founded in 1930 when a Roman Catholic church was constructed. However, in 1828, an indigenous village of about 50 people was reported to exist near Jodensavanne, a Jewish autonomous plantation area which was abandoned after a fire in 1832.

In the late 1980s, during the Surinamese Interior War, the village was evacuated and partially destroyed. The village was rebuilt in 1992; however, many inhabitants have remained in Paramaribo.

== Overview ==
Redi Doti has a school and a clinic. In 2015, a new school building was constructed. The pineapple industry is the main source of income for the village. The village has 9,000 hectares of communal forest for hunting, fishing and subsistence farming. In 2019, Marchano Stuger was elected as the new village chief.

== Transport ==
The village used be accessed via the Carolinabrug, which provided access to the Avobakaweg to Paramaribo. However, the bridge was damaged after it was hit by a boat, and in 2014, a new bridge was constructed near Redi Doti.
