= Tzedek ve-Shalom =

Historic former synagogue in Paramaribo, Suriname

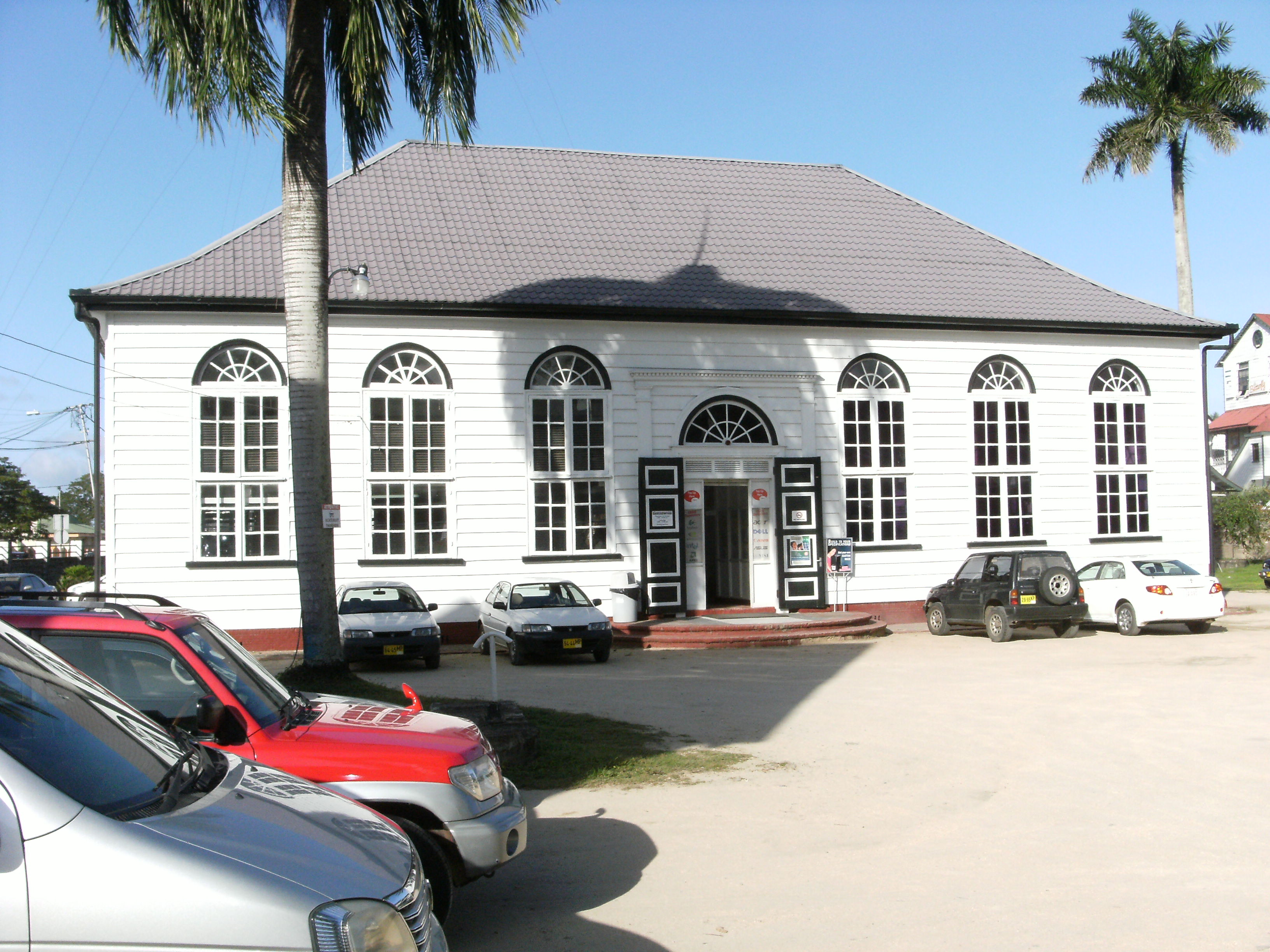
- The former synagogue, in 2009, as a computer store

- Location of the former synagogue in Suriname

Religion
- Affiliation: Judaism (former)
- Rite: Nusach Sefard
- Ecclesiastical or organizational status: Synagogue (1736–1999); Profane use
- Status: Closed; Repurposed

Location
- Location: Paramaribo
- Country: Suriname
- Interactive map of Tzedek ve-Shalom
- Coordinates: 5°49′40″N 55°09′19″W

Architecture
- Type: Synagogue architecture
- Style: Neoclassical
- Completed: 1736

The Tzedek ve-Shalom, also written as Zedek ve Shalom, (Peace and Justice) is a historic former Jewish synagogue, that is located in Paramaribo, Suriname. It was built for a Sephardic congregation in 1736.

== Overview ==
The synagogue stopped being used in 1999 when the area's remaining Jewish residents combined congregations at Neveh Shalom Synagogue. It is being used as a computer repair store. Its furnishings are in the collection of the Israel Museum.

The building is sited in a large courtyard, built of wood in a Neoclassical style with arched windows and bench seating, and painted white. It has a wide basilica-like hall with a tevah (reader's platform) opposite the heikhal (Torah ark). Decoration included brass chandeliers from the Netherlands. It has a sandy floor.

== See also ==
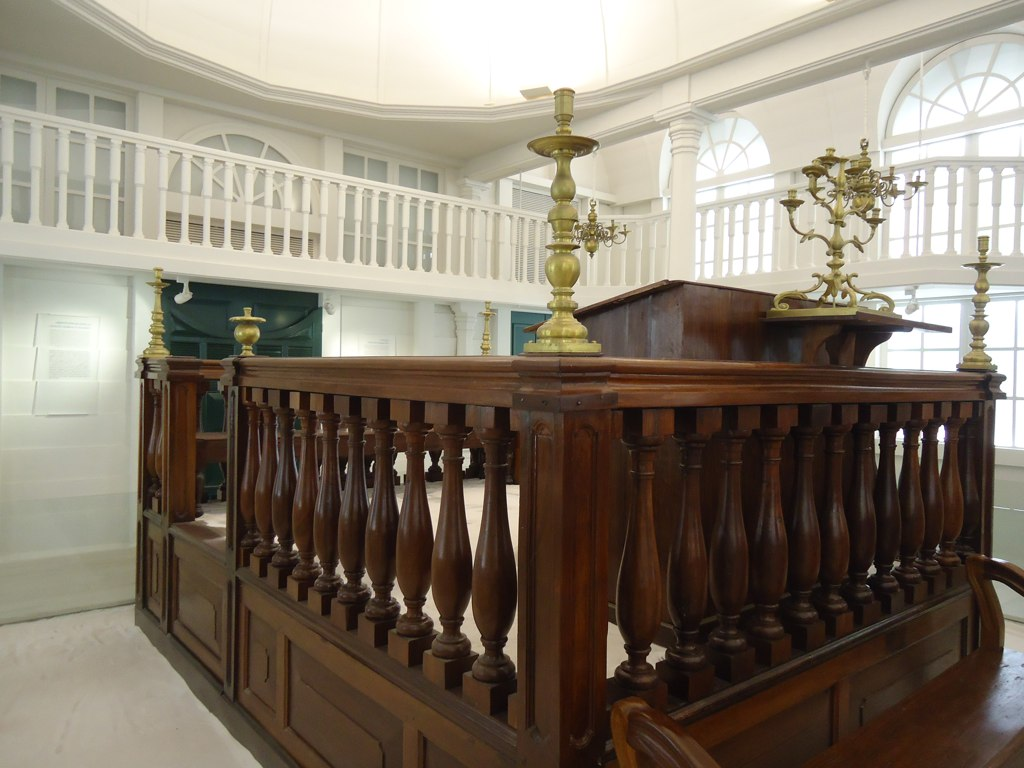
Interior in Israel Museum in Jerusalem

- History of Jews in Suriname
- Esnoga
