= David Cohen Nassy =

Jewish explorer (born 1612)

David Cohen Nassy (born 1612) started Jewish communities in the Caribbean. He had several nicknames: Cristovão de Távora (his Christian name) and José Nunes da Fonseca (his tradename).

He fled to Amsterdam (Dutch Republic) because of the Inquisition in Portugal. He married Ribca (Maria) Drago and they had 12 children. David lived in Amsterdam and was authorized in 1662 by Abraham Cohen to go to Cayenne (now the capital of French Guiana). In 1664 he went to Cayenne with a great number of Jews, but was refused to set up volksplantingen in Cayenne. David and his Jews travelled to Surinam and they settled at Jodensavanne on the Surinam river.

David de Ishak Cohen Nassy, born in Suriname in 1747, had a wife called Esther.

David [de Ishak Cohen] Nassy, a man of letters, a physician, slaveowner, and Jewish leader in the Dutch colony of Suriname in the late 18th century... He moved between the world of the Enlightenment and the ferment of colonial thought; how he viewed slavery; and what his relations were with the Africans and Indians of Suriname, especially with those Africans drawn into the Jewish religion.

Nassy is the supposed author of the book ‘History of the Colony of Suriname. Compiled by a company of learned Jewish men there.’ From this in 1791 published document a wealth of information has been saved. ...[He] was the owner of Plantation De Tulpenburg, between Torarica and The Guinee Friendship. "That’s a half day travel by boat to go to the synagogue, with one of those elegant tent boats you’ll see in the engravings. When you know one wasn’t allowed to work after Friday sunset, they were probably busy all Friday getting to Jodensavanne in time for the Sabbath. ...His plantation went bankrupt, he worked as a self-educated pharmacist, and he lost his dearly loved wife Esther in a smallpox epidemic. A love poem on her final resting-place says all of his feelings: "...your memory grows dearer without pain…" the inscription on Nassy’s grave is difficult to read. ...
