= French ship Cassard =

Eleven ships of the French Navy have borne the name Cassard in honour of Jacques Cassard:

- Cassard (1795–1806), a Téméraire-class ship of the line renamed Dix-Août in 1798 and Brave in 1803
- Cassard (1801–1802), a small craft
- Cassard (1803–1815), a Téméraire-class ship of the line launched as Lion
- Cassard (1832–1850), a 20-gun brig
- Cassard (1846–1882), a steam corvette. She served as Napoléon III's imperial yacht Reine Hortense.
- Cassard (1860–1879), a Monge-class aviso
- Cassard (1866–1894), a Talisman-class aviso
- Cassard (1898–1924), a D'Assas-class protected cruiser
- Cassard (1933–1942), a Vauquelin-class destroyer
- Cassard (D623), a T 47-class destroyer (1956–1976)
- Cassard (D614), lead ship of the Cassard-class frigates, decommissioned in 2019
