= Jodensavanne =

Sephardic Jewish community in Suriname

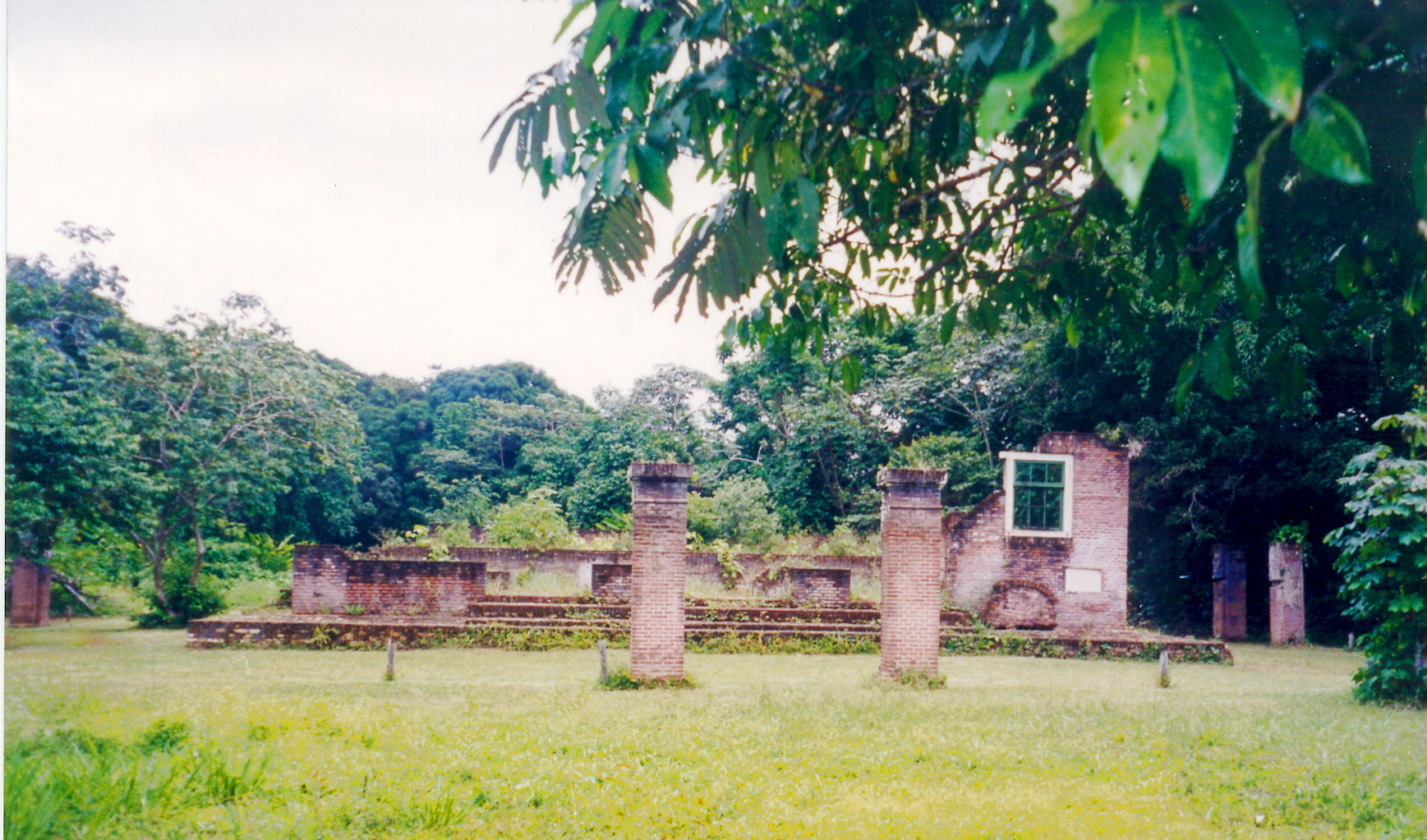
- The remains of the Beracha ve Shalom ("Blessings and Peace") synagogue on the Jodensavanne (February 2000)

- Location within Suriname
- 5°25′45.02″N 54°59′3.43″W
- Type: Settlement
- Location: Carolina, Para District, Suriname

UNESCO World Heritage Site
- Official name: Jodensavanne Archaeological Site: Jodensavanne Settlement and Cassipora Creek Cemetery
- Type: Cultural
- Criteria: iii
- Designated: 2023 (45th session)
- Reference no.: 1680

Jodensavanne (Dutch, "Jewish Savanna") was a Jewish plantation community in Suriname, South America, and was for a time the centre of Jewish life in the colony. It was established in the 1600s by Sephardi Jews and became more developed and wealthy after a group of Jews fleeing persecution in Brazil settled there in the 1660s. It was located in what is now Para District, about 50 km (31 mi) south of the capital Paramaribo, on the Suriname River. Sugarcane plantations were established by forcing Black African people to work as slaves. At its height in around 1700, Jodensavanne was home to roughly 500 plantation owners and 9000 enslaved people. The colony faced regular attacks from Indigenous people, slave revolts, and even raids from the French navy. The community eventually relocated to the capital of Paramaribo. Clearing of grave sites and maintenance of the synagogue ruins has been attempted at various times from the 1940s to the 21st century.

Jodensavanne along with the Cassipora Cemetery were designated a UNESCO World Heritage Site in September 2023 under the name Jodensavanne Archaeological Site: Jodensavanne Settlement and Cassipora Creek Cemetery.

== History ==
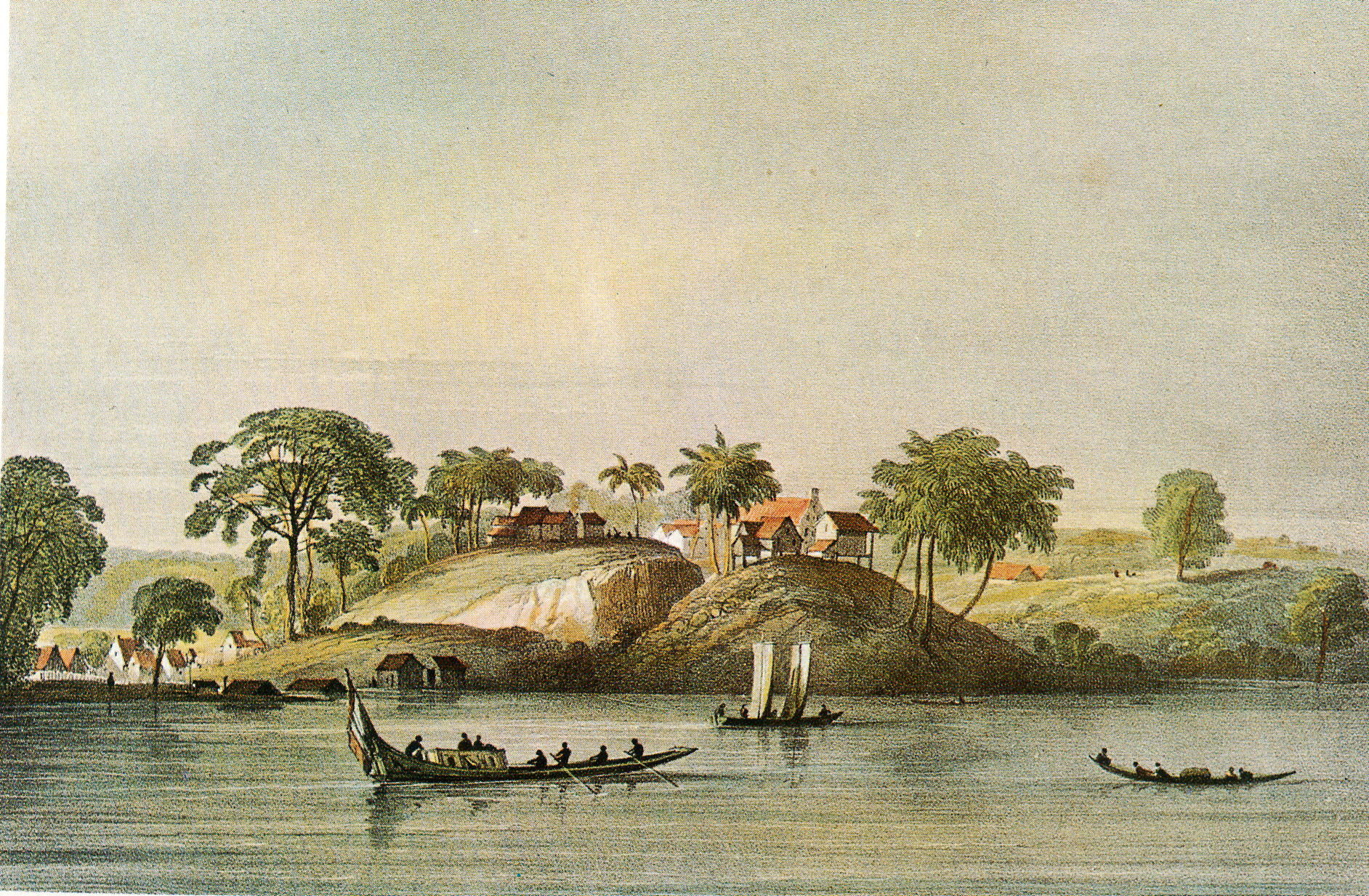
Jodensavanne around 1830

In 1639, the English, who controlled Suriname at the time, allowed Sephardi Jews from the Netherlands, Portugal and Italy to settle in the area. They came first to the old capital Torarica. On 8 April 1651, a petition was sent to the English Council of State by Benjamin de Caseras, Henry de Caseras, and Jacob Fraso for the permission to live and trade in the territories of Suriname and Barbados, marking a solid date for the origins of a Jewish community being established within the territory. In the year 1652, a new group of approximately twelve hundred that migrated under the leadership of Francis, Lord Willoughby settled in the area now known as Jodensavanne. A third group came 1664, after their expulsion from Brazil and then French Guiana, led by David Cohen Nassy. The British attempted to keep this group from moving again by guaranteeing them privileges including the right to operate their own court and to have freedom of religion. It was at around this time that the community took on the name Savanne after the fields which surrounded it; the settlement was built on a raised area of ground and was first built with one main road and four side streets. A school was built which taught Spanish and Portuguese in addition to Jewish topics. Part of the reason that these Jews were preparing for more permanent settlement was that, unlike Christian colonists who often hoped to get rich running a plantation and return to Europe, residents of Jodensavanne did not have anywhere in Europe to return to.

This Jewish community developed a sugar-cane plantation economy which used African slaves as labor; according to some accounts newly settled families received 4 or 5 slaves as part of their communal grant. As the Dutch gained control of Suriname, they preserved the rights granted to this Jewish community and even expanded it in some ways, including the right to carry goods on Sundays and banish people from their community, as well as a 1691 land grant of 100 acres for building a synagogue and burial site. The settlement reached its largest size in around 1700 when it was estimated to have 570 citizens.

Jodensavanne's slave-owning citizens also regularly engaged in conflict with neighboring Indigenous populations and with enslaved people in their plantations. In 1670, according to the Essai Historique, approximately two hundred or so Jewish people had left Suriname, and in 1677, a year before the Carib assault on Jodensavanne, ten Jewish families had left with their slaves. European settlements including those in the Jodensavanne were attacked by Carib (Kalina people) in the latter part of 1678 and slaves also revolted. Again in 1690 there was a slave revolt on the plantation of an owner named Immanuel Machado, who was killed and whose former slaves fled to a Maroon community. French sailors, aware of the richness of the community, also raided it in 1712. Due to the many attacks, especially by former slaves, the colonists built up a defensive system around the settlement.

The congregation Beracha ve Shalom ("Blessings and Peace") was founded, with the first wooden synagogue in the community (the 3rd synagogue in South America) built between 1665 and 1671 and renovated in 1827. The construction of this synagogue marked the move of the centre of Jewish life in the region from Torarica to Jodensavanne. This first synagogue contained a separate section for women, an archive for the community, and silver detailing on the wooden building. A second, made of imported brick, was constructed in 1685. Before the construction of the Beracha ve Shalom, there had been no synagogue of major architectural significance in the Americas. The centennial celebration of the Synagogue, celebrated in October 1785, was said to have an attendance of more than 1500 persons, many of whom sailed in from Paramaribo, since by that time only twenty or so Jewish families were still living in Jodensavanne. Efforts were also made in the twentieth century to clear and preserve the synagogue ruins.

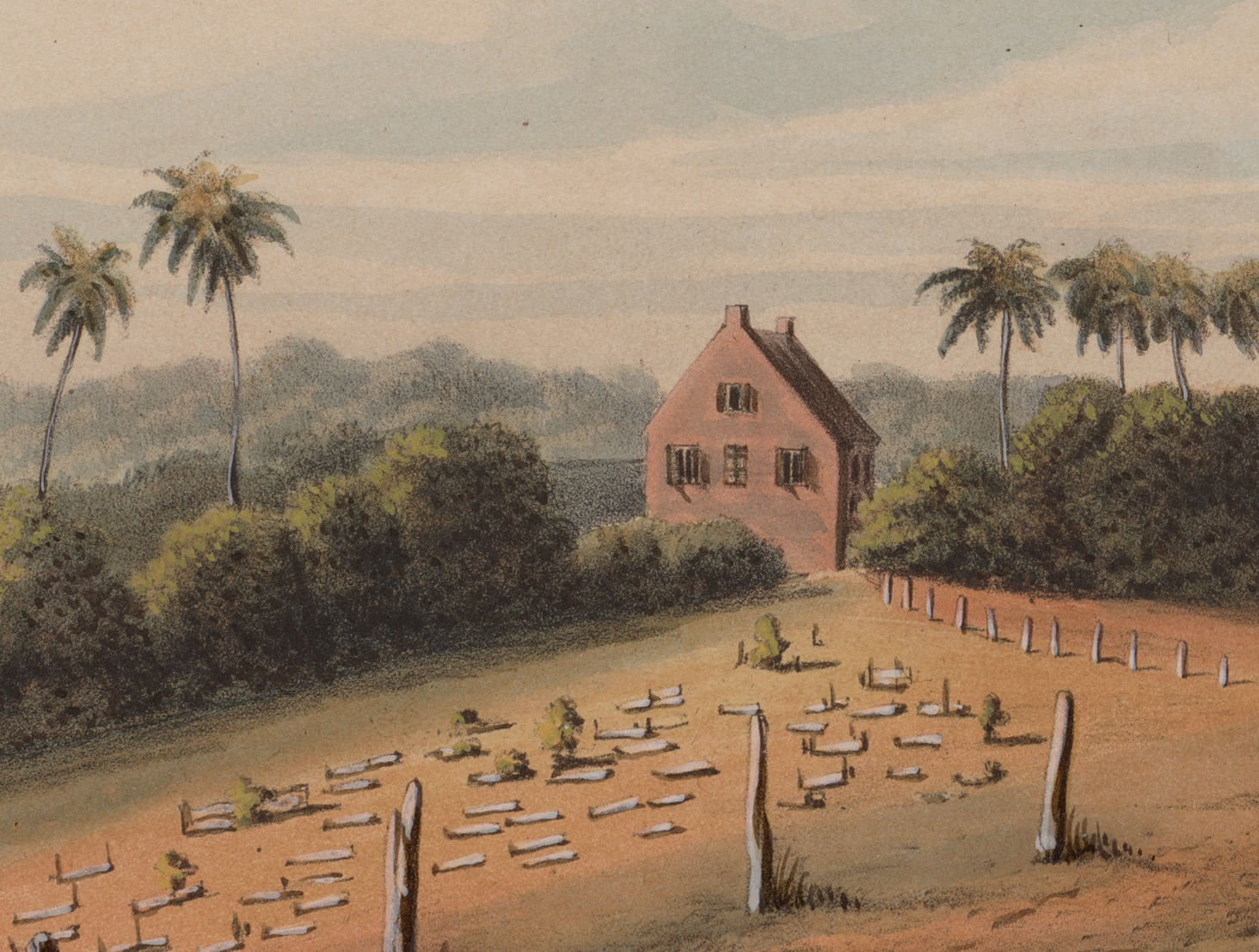
Jodensavanne synagogue grounds circa 1860

Jodensavanne declined during the mid-18th century, and most of its population moved to Paramaribo. In the eighteenth century, Suriname was rocked by a series of crises which hit Jewish plantations, some of which were among the oldest in the colony, particularly hard. Expenses tended to increase as a result of: a hefty tribute levied by the Cassard expedition; the collapse of a major Amsterdam sugarcane importer in 1773; and the accrual of real estate loans. The introduction of sugar beet cultivation in Europe from 1784 and the depletion of soils on the oldest plantations both decreased revenues. Security conditions deteriorated as a result of ongoing Maroon Wars, while the growth of Paramaribo as the colony's exclusive trading port, nearer to the coast, acted to pull Jews away from Jodensavanne. By 1790, Jodensavanne's population was approximated to be around twenty-two, excluding slaves. This dropped to less than ten by the early 19th century. The settlement continued in its reduced state until it was destroyed by fire during a slave revolt in 1832.

During World War II, an internment camp was built near the location of the former Jewish settlement and named after it, the Jodensavanne internment camp. It was constructed in 1942 to house 146 political prisoners from the Dutch East Indies who were considered hard-core German sympathisers or members of the Dutch NSB or the German NSDAP. However, some Indonesian nationalists were also deported to Jodensavanne, most famously Ernest Douwes Dekker.

Historian Natalie Zemon Davis is working on a history of 18th century Jodensavanne, focusing on David Cohen Nassy (born 1747), and relations between black and white people within the Jewish community. An article titled 'Regaining Jerusalem' was published in 2016 by Davis, detailing a celebration of Passover within Jodensavanne.

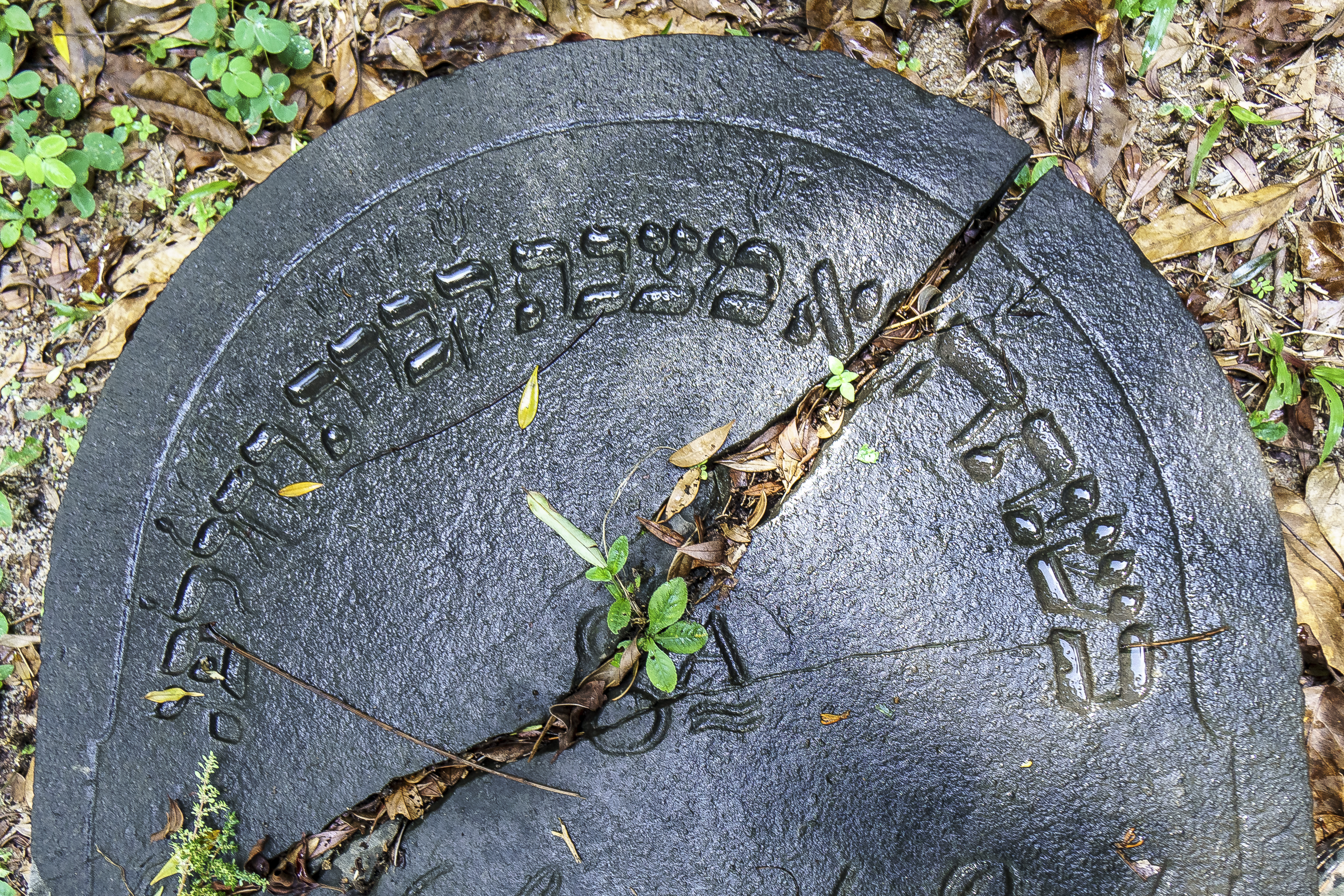
A recovered gravestone from one of the cemeteries located in Jodensavanne, inscribed in Hebrew

== Current situation ==
As of the current day, all that remains at the site of Jodensavanne are the remnants of the Berache ve Shalom Synagogue, alongside three cemeteries, of which the headstones are primarily inscribed with Hebrew and Portuguese.

The Archaeological Institute of the Americas, in partnership with the University of Suriname, engaged in a project labeled as the 'Interactive Dig Jodensavanne', of which conservation efforts and record-keeping projects have been active since 2014.

The Jodensavanne is located near the indigenous village of Redi Doti, in the Carolina resort, and connected to the outside world with the Carolinabrug which leads to the Avobakaweg onto Paramaribo or via the Desiré Delano Bouterse Highway to the airport.

== Population ==
Jodensavanne's population has not been clearly established. Sources such as the Essai Historique, assert the population to be held at approximately one thousand in 1677; in contrast, historians such as Harry Friedenwald have argued for a lack of strong Jewish presence, an assertion that would imply a less populated Jodensavanne.

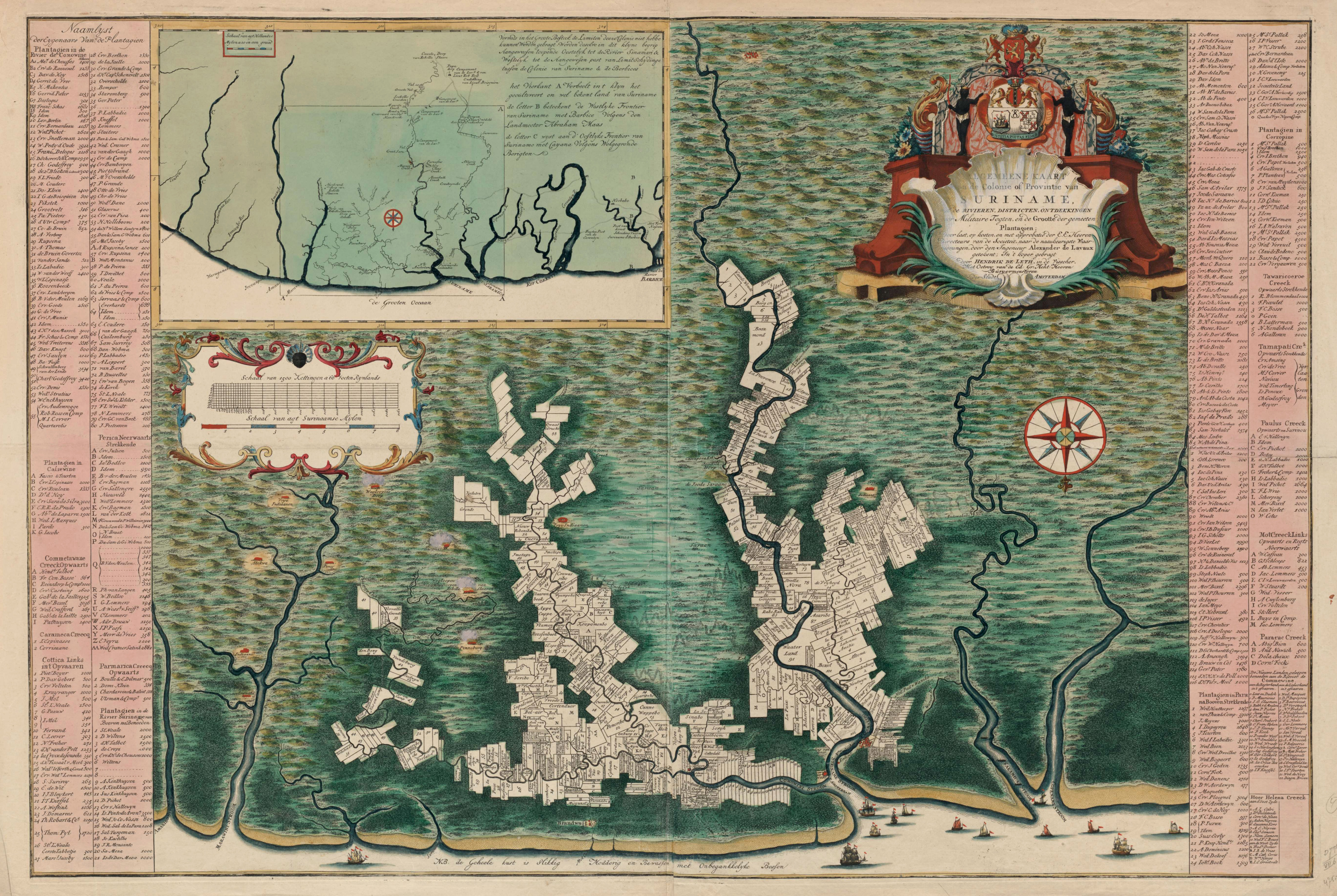
A map detailing and listing the plantations found alongside the Surinam river, the location of Jodensavanne provided.

There were around 70 existing plantations along the Suriname River in 1750, most of which bearing 'Jewish' names, such as the thousand-acre properties owned by one Solomon Meza. These plantations were marked and identified through an 18th-century map titled, "Algemeene Kaart van de Colonie of Provintie van Surinam", drawn by engineer Alexander de Lavaux, a Berlin native who served in Prussian forces.

There were several cemeteries located within Jodensavanne, of which the most heavily used, and first existing cemetery is known as the Cassipora Cemetery. Named in due part to the Cassipora Creek that stems from the Surinam river, it is expected to hold approximately two hundred tombstones, the earliest of which being from the early 17th century, and the most recent believed to have been constructed in 1840. The headstones here are primarily inscribed with Hebrew, Portuguese, and Dutch, and there exist several ohelim in the area as well, an indication of the Jewish community structures within the settlement.

== See also ==
- History of the Jews in Suriname
