= HMS Falcon (1704) =

History

England
- Name: HMS Falcon
- Ordered: 16 March 1703
- Builder: Deptford Dockyard
- Launched: 2 December 1704
- Commissioned: 1 December 1704
- Captured: 29 December 1709
- Fate: Taken off Toulon by a French Squadron

General characteristics as built
- Class & type: 32-gun fifth rate
- Tons burthen: 41153/94 tons (bm)
- Length: 106 ft 5 in (32.44 m) gundeck; 88 ft 5 in (26.95 m) keel for tonnage
- Beam: 29 ft 7 in (9.02 m)
- Depth of hold: 13 ft 0 in (3.96 m)
- Propulsion: Sails
- Sail plan: Full-rigged ship
- Complement: 145/110
- Armament: as built 32 guns; 4/4 × demi-culverins (LD); 22/20 × 6-pdr guns (UD); 6/4 × 4-pdr guns (QD)
- Notes: the demi-culverins would be changed for 12-pdr guns later

HMS Falcon was a 32-gun fifth rate built at Deptford Dockyard in 1703/04. Her initial assignment was with Sir Cloudesley Shovell's Fleet. She was then assigned to the Mediterranean where she was taken by the French in 1709.

Falcon was the thirteenth vessel to bear this name since it was used for a ballinger dating from 1343 and sold in 1352.

== Construction and specifications ==
Falcon was ordered on 16 March 1703 to be built at Deptford Dockyard under the guidance of Master Shipwright Fisher Harding. She was launched on 2 December 1704. Her dimensions were a gundeck of 106 feet 5 inches (32.44 metres) with a keel of 88 feet 5 inches (26.95 metres) for tonnage calculation with a breadth of 29 feet 7 inches (9.02 metres) and a depth of hold of 13 feet 0 inches (3.96 metres). Her builder's measure tonnage was calculated as 41153/94 tons (burthen).

The gun armament initially was four demi-culverins (Note: A demi-culverin was a gun of 3,400 pounds with a four-inch bore firing a 9.5-pound shot with an eight-pound powder charge) on the lower deck (LD) with two pair of guns per side. The upper deck (UD) battery would consist of between twenty and twenty-two 6-pounder guns (Note: A 6-pounder was a Dutch gun used to replace the saker) with ten or eleven guns per side. The gun battery would be completed by four 4-pounder guns (Note: A minion renamed the 4-pounder was a gun of 1,000 pounds with a 3.5-inch bore firing a 4-pound shot with a 4-pound powder charge.) on the quarterdeck (QD) with two to three guns per side.

== Commissioned service 1702-1709 ==
Falcon was commissioned on 1 December 1704 under the command of Captain Charles Stewart then assigned to Sir Cloudesley Shovell's Fleet. Captain Bartholomew Candler was assigned as her commander on 27 January 1706. On 30 April 1706 Captain Robert Delvall assumed command for service in the Mediterranean. Captain Delvall dies on 29 January 1708. Captain William Massam took command on 17 May 1708 and held this command until his suicide on 2 October 1708. Captain Charles Constable took command after Captain Massam's death. In consort with Pembroke. they were detached to cruise between Toulon and Corsica.

== Loss ==
Falcon was taken along with Pembroke by a French squadron off Toulon on 29 December 1709. She struck her colours when only 16 members of her crew were left unwounded.
