= List of cities and towns in Suriname =

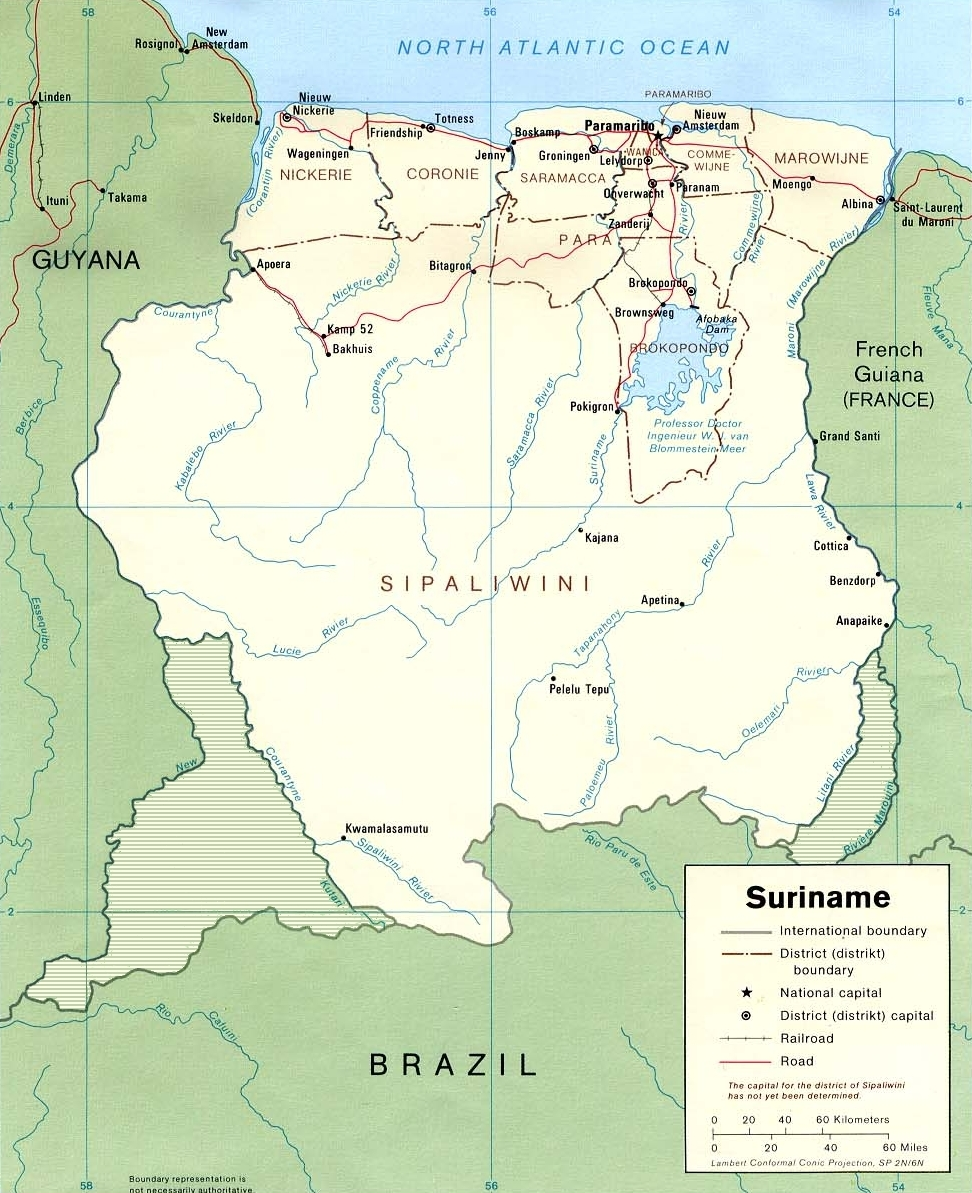
Map of Suriname

This is a list of cities and towns in Suriname.

== Largest cities and towns ==
Largest cities or towns in Suriname
Rank	Name	District	Pop.
1	Paramaribo	Paramaribo	223 757
2	Lelydorp	Wanica	18 223
3	Nieuw Nickerie	Nickerie	13 143
4	Moengo	Marowijne	7 074
5	Nieuw Amsterdam	Commewijne	4 935
6	Mariënburg	Commewijne	4 427
7	Wageningen	Nickerie	4 145
8	Albina	Marowijne	3 985
9	Groningen	Saramacca	3 216
10	Brownsweg	Brokopondo	2 696

== Alphabetical list ==
- Abenaston
- Albina
- Alfonsdorp
- Alliance
- Anapaike
- Apetina
- Apoera
- Aurora
- Batavia
- Benzdorp
- Berlijn
- Bitagron
- Boskamp
- Boslanti
- Botopasi
- Brokopondo
- Brownsweg
- Cabendadorp
- Cassipora
- Corneliskondre
- Cottica
- Djumu
- Donderskamp
- Friendship
- Goddo
- Groningen
- Hollandse Kamp
- Jenny
- Kalebaskreek
- Kasuela (disputed)
- Kajana
- Koewarasan
- Kwakoegron
- Kwamalasamutu
- Lelydorp
- Lebidoti
- Manlobi
- Mary's Hope
- Matta
- Moengo
- Mora kondre
- Nason
- Nieuw Amsterdam
- Nieuw Jacobkondre
- Nieuw Nickerie
- Onverdacht
- Onverwacht
- Paramaribo (Capital and largest city)
- Paranam
- Pelelu Tepu
- Pikin Saron
- Pokigron
- Pontoetoe
- Powakka
- Redi Doti
- Ricanau Mofo
- Snesiekondre
- Totness
- Uitkijk
- Villa Brazil
- Wageningen
- Wanhatti
- Washabo
- Witsanti
- Zanderij
