= Sabakoe =

- Village
- Location in Suriname
- Coordinates: 5°25′23″N 55°11′27″W
- Country: Suriname
- District: Para
- Resort: Zuid
- Time zone: UTC-3 (ART)

Sabakoe is an Amerindian hamlet in Para District, Suriname, located near Zanderij. It is also the Surinamese name of little blue herons, which is used as the logo of Surinam Airways.

Sabakoe is located in the savannah along the Sabakoe Creek about an hour's walk from Berlijn. In 1904, it was described as a tiny hamlet. As of 2022, it is not listed as an official Amerindian settlement.
