= Fred Derby =

Surinamese politician

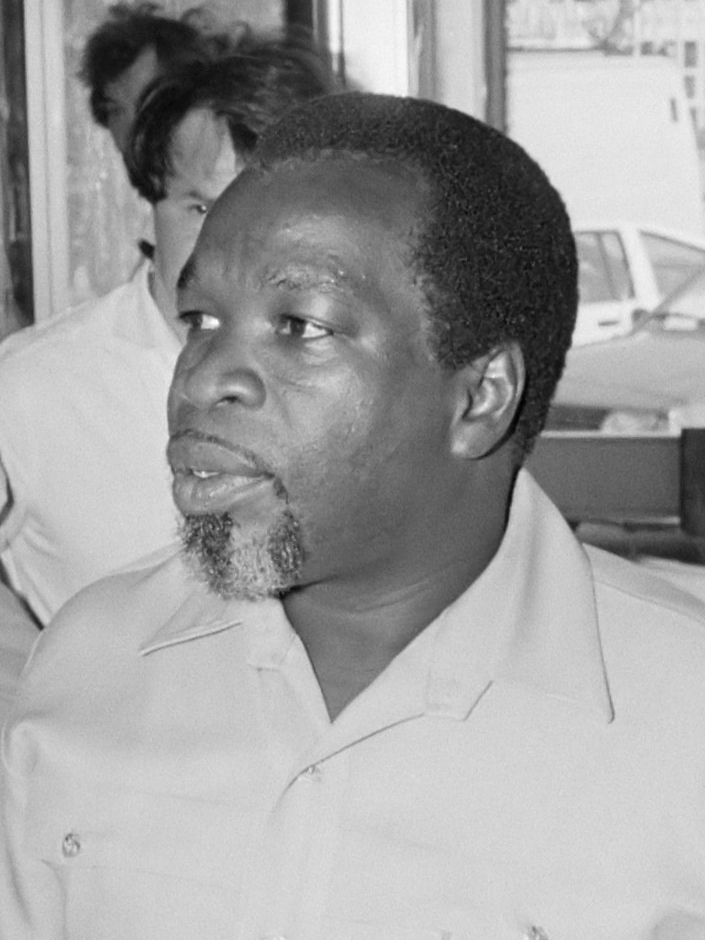
- Born: Frederik Marinus Emanuel Derby; March 31, 1940; Berlijn, Para, Suriname
- Died: May 19, 2001 (aged 61); Paramaribo, Suriname
- Occupations: Politician, trade unionist
- Political party: Nationalist Republican Party; Surinamese Labour Party

Frederik Marinus Emanuel Derby (March 31, 1940 – May 19, 2001) was a Surinamese politician and trade unionist. He was the only survivor of the December murders. In the years before his death he fought for an investigation into these events, and he told what had happened to him in Fort Zeelandia.

== Biography ==
Derby was born in the district of Para, on the site of a former plantation, Berlijn. In 1954, he left as foster carer to Paramaribo. He attended the secondary school, and received the certificate for teacher. Then he became a teacher at a technical school. In 1968, he was a trade unionist, and was involved in the establishment of the Confederation C-47 in 1970. He joined the Nationalist Republican Party (PNR), which sought the independence of Suriname and sat on behalf of that party from 1973 to 1977 in the Parliament of Suriname.

On the night of 7 to 8 December 1982, he was arrested by soldiers and taken to Fort Zeelandia. The next day, he was the only one of those arrested released, according to his own words on the initiative of Dési Bouterse. Derby emerged as a strong opponent of Bouterse and fought in the last years of his life for an investigation into the December murders. On December 8, 2000, he first told what had happened. On December 8, 1982, he had also told his story in the documentary The dilemma of Derby, by Yvette Forster.

Derby founded in 1987, along with Siegfried Gilds the Surinamese Labour Party (SLA). Through the SLA, he was involved in the government of Ronald Venetiaan. He was a great opponent of the involvement of the International Monetary Fund in Suriname and was afraid that it would be mainly Indo-Surinamese businessmen who would take over the service sector in Suriname.

Derby was married and had seven children. He died at the age of 61 in Paramaribo due to cardiac arrest, shortly after he collapsed during a game of football.
