= Cabendadorp =

Cabendadorp Kabenda dorp
- Village
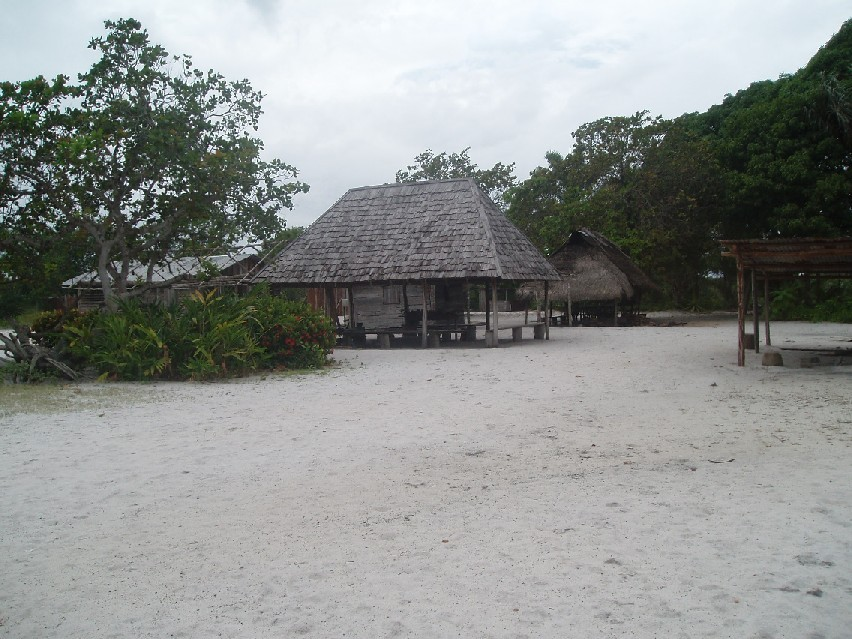
- Cabendadorp (2006)

- Location within Suriname
- Coordinates: 5.3853°N 55.1589°W
- Country: Suriname
- District: Para District
- Resort: Zuid
- Established: 1974

Government
  - Captain: Jeane Kabenda

Population (2022)
  - Total: 330
- Time zone: UTC-3 (AST)

Cabendadorp (also Kabenda dorp) is an Indigenous village of Kalina Amerindians in the resort of Zuid in the Para District in Suriname. The village is located on the Avobakaweg south of the Johan Adolf Pengel International Airport.

== History ==
The village was founded in 1974 by Joseph Cabenda who served as village chief until his death in 2012.

The village is home to Leo Julius Toenaé whose family produces pottery, and who was known as a story teller.

== Overview ==
Cabendadorp has a clinic. As of 2020, there is no school and the children have to take the bus to neighbouring Powakka and Zanderij. The village has been allocated 4,375 hectares of communal land. The village chief as of 2020 is Jeane Kabenda.
