= Theo Jubitana =

Surinamese administrator and politician (1965–2021)

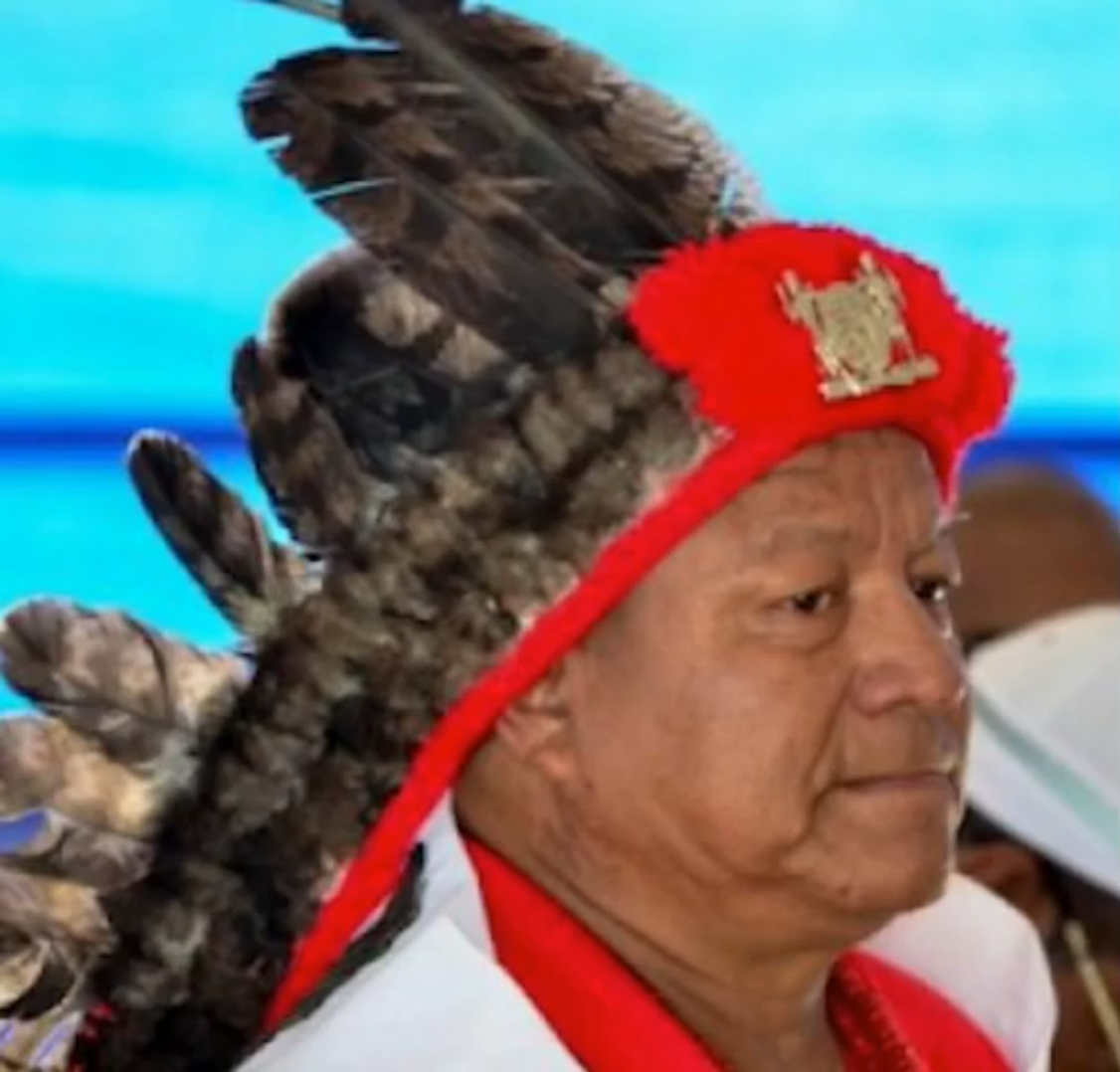

Leader of the Amazon Party Suriname
- In office 2019 – 20 July 2021

Chairman of VIDS
- In office 2017 – 20 July 2021

Captain of Hollandse Kamp
- In office 2011 – 20 July 2021

Personal details
- Born: Theodoris Bernardus Jubitana; 10 April 1965 Nickerie District, Suriname
- Died: 20 July 2021 (aged 56) Paramaribo, Suriname
- Occupation: Politician, teacher

Theodoris Bernardus Jubitana (10 April 1965 – 20 July 2021) was a Surinamese administrator and politician. He was captain of the indigenous village Hollandse Kamp since 2011. In addition, he was chairman of the Association of Indigenous Village Heads Suriname (VIDS) since 2017 and leader of the political party Amazon Party Suriname (APS) since 2019. He died in July 2021 from the effects of COVID-19.

== Early life ==
Theodoris Bernardus Jubitana was born in Nickerie District on 10 April 1965, to a Lokono family, the ninth of eleven children. He grew up in the village of Tapoeripa along the Nickerie River. After elementary school, he studied for six years in a Paramaribo boarding school for children from the interior of Suriname. He then took classes at a technical school, and completed training to become a teacher of industrial education (OLNO).

Jubitana married Marcia Parana in 1995, and they had six children.

== Political career ==
Jubitana was elected captain of Hollandse Kamp in Para District in a village meeting on 7 August 2011. He succeeded Stefanus Sabajo. Jubitana's election was endorsed by a representative of the district commissioner on 3 September. On 4 February 2012, he and his three basiyas (deputies) were traditionally inaugurated in the presence of President Desi Bouterse.

Jubitana was subsequently elected chairman of the Organization of Collaborating Indigenous Villages in Para and Wanica (OSIP). A key pillar of his policy was to demand and enforce the land rights of indigenous people. Following a demonstration in August 2016, the organisation was able to initiate talks with the government on this subject.

After a four-day meeting, Jubitana succeeded Lesley Artist as chairman of the National Association of Indigenous Village Heads Suriname (VIDS) in August 2017. In September 2018, a schism occurred in the VIDS when Artist and his village Redidoti withdrew from the association. Artist attributed this decision to a disagreement between him and Jubitana on the land rights talks; Redidoti was followed by nine more villages. According to Jubitana, attacks and threats were already expected as the process surrounding land rights had entered a crucial phase. In October 2019, a draft law was delivered by Edgar Dikan, the Minister of Regional Development.

Meanwhile, in June 2019, Jubitana took over the helm of the political party Amazon Party Suriname (APS) from René Artist. He did so to raise the profile of indigenous people's issues within politics. In his words, "Indigenous people in parliament can hardly do anything, since party discipline keeps them silent."

Jubitana led the APS in the 2020 general election. However, his party did not gain any seats.

== Death ==
In the first week of July 2021, during the COVID-19 pandemic in Suriname, Jubitana was hospitalized after becoming infected with COVID-19. On 20 July, he died from the effects of the disease. He was 56 years old.
