= Berlijn, Suriname =

Berlijn Balen
- Village
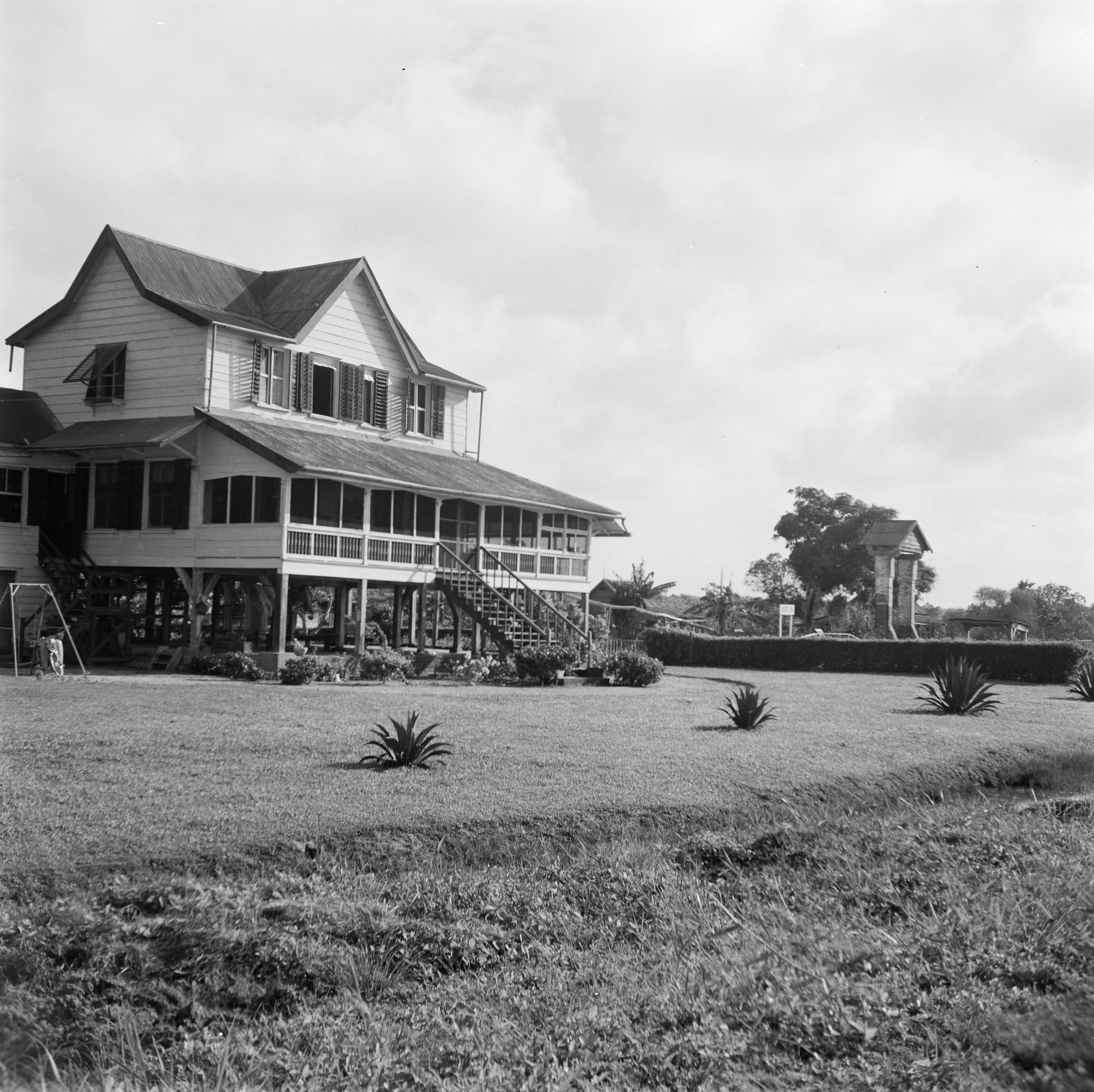
- Plantation house (1962)

- Location within Suriname
- Coordinates: 5.3990°N 55.1843°W
- Country: Suriname
- District: Para District
- Resort: Zuid
- Time zone: UTC-3 (AST)

Berlijn (Sranan Tongo: Balen) is a village and former wood plantation in the resort of Zuid in the Para District in Suriname. It is located on the Para Creek, and about 4 kilometres (2.5 mi) from the Johan Adolf Pengel International Airport.

== Overview ==
On 25 February 1763, Johan Godlieb van Borrius bought 1,000 Surinamese acres (about 430 hectares) of land, and founded the wood plantation Berlijn. The plantation was located near maroon territory, therefore, a military outpost was established in Berlijn. In the late 18th century, Berlijn became the largest supplier of wood in Suriname. In 1821, the plantation was bought by James Balfour who wanted to transport the slaves to his sugar plantation Waterloo. In Paramaribo, the slaves discovered their final destination, revolted, and escaped back to Berlijn. The government ruled that they could remain in Berlijn.

In 1863, the slaves were emancipated, and the plantation closed. Many of the freed slaves, remained on the land. In 1912, the Lawa Railway opened with a station in Berlijn. The railway operated until 1996. In 1937, Berlijn was officially founded as a village. In 1957, a road was built from Berlijn to Zanderij near the Johan Adolf Pengel International Airport. The economy is mainly based on subsistence farming, and people who work at the airport and Cola Creek, a nearby tourist resort.

== Notable people ==
- Fred Derby (1940–2001), trade unionist, politician, and only survivor of the December murders

== Bibliography ==
- Franke, Richard (1971). "Economic circuits in a Surinam village". New West Indian Guide / Nieuwe West-Indische Gids.
