= Coropina Creek =

River in Suriname

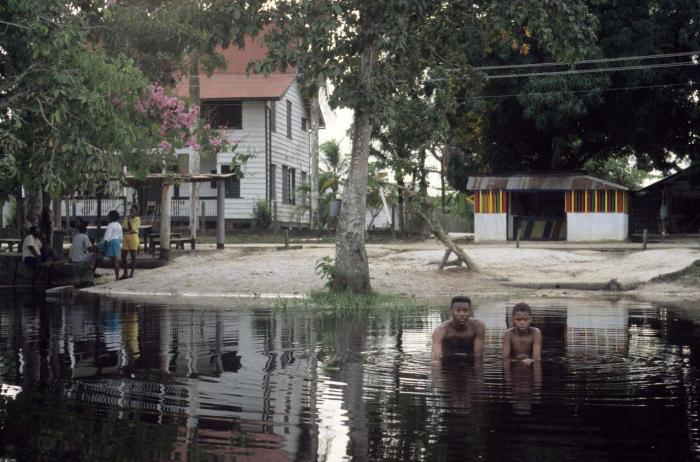
- Bersaba Recreation Resort at Coropina Creek (1997)

- Location within Suriname
- Native name: Coropinakreek (Dutch)

Location
- Country: Suriname
- District: Para

Physical characteristics
- Source
  - location: Swamp forest in Para
  - coordinates: 5°24′29.7″N 55°15′32.2″W
- Mouth
  - coordinates: 5°31′3.4″N 55°9′34.9″W

Coropina Creek (in Dutch: Coropinakreek) is a blackwater river in the Para district of Suriname. The river originates in swamp forests in southern Para, meanders through the district, and eventually merges with the Para River.

== History ==
Coropina Creek was originally inhabited by the indigenous Kalina. In 1679, the colonists were attacked by the Kalina. One of the focal points of resistance was the village of Pipebo, situated near Coropina Creek. In 1686, a peace truce was established with the indigenous peoples.

Plantations were established along the Para River and Coropina Creek, and by 1737, the indigenous people had been driven out to Parasavana.

Mainly timber plantations were situated along Coropina Creek. After the abolition of slavery in 1861, the abandoned plantations were divided into plots of land and sold to the former slaves.

At the beginning of the 20th century, the recreation resort Scheveningen was opened near Coropina Creek, attracting many families for day recreation. Scheveningen no longer exists, but the recreational resorts of Bersaba and Cola Creek on the same-named tributary are now well-visited.

In 1933, a pumping and purification facility was built in Republiek, supplying Paramaribo and the surrounding area with drinking water. Since the 1960s, Brazilian moonfish have been discovered in the river.

== Gallery ==
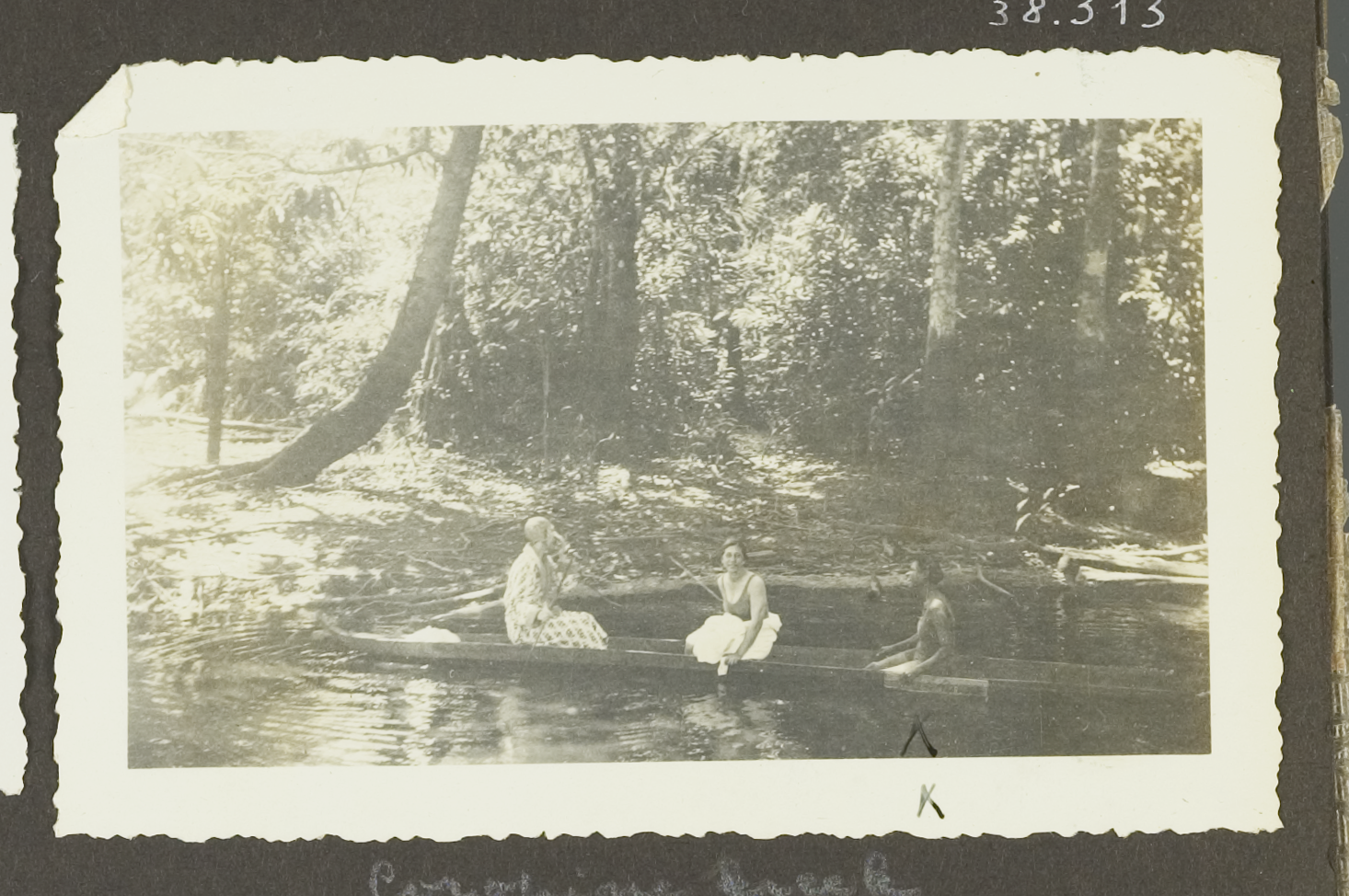
Vacations at the Coropina Creek (1936)

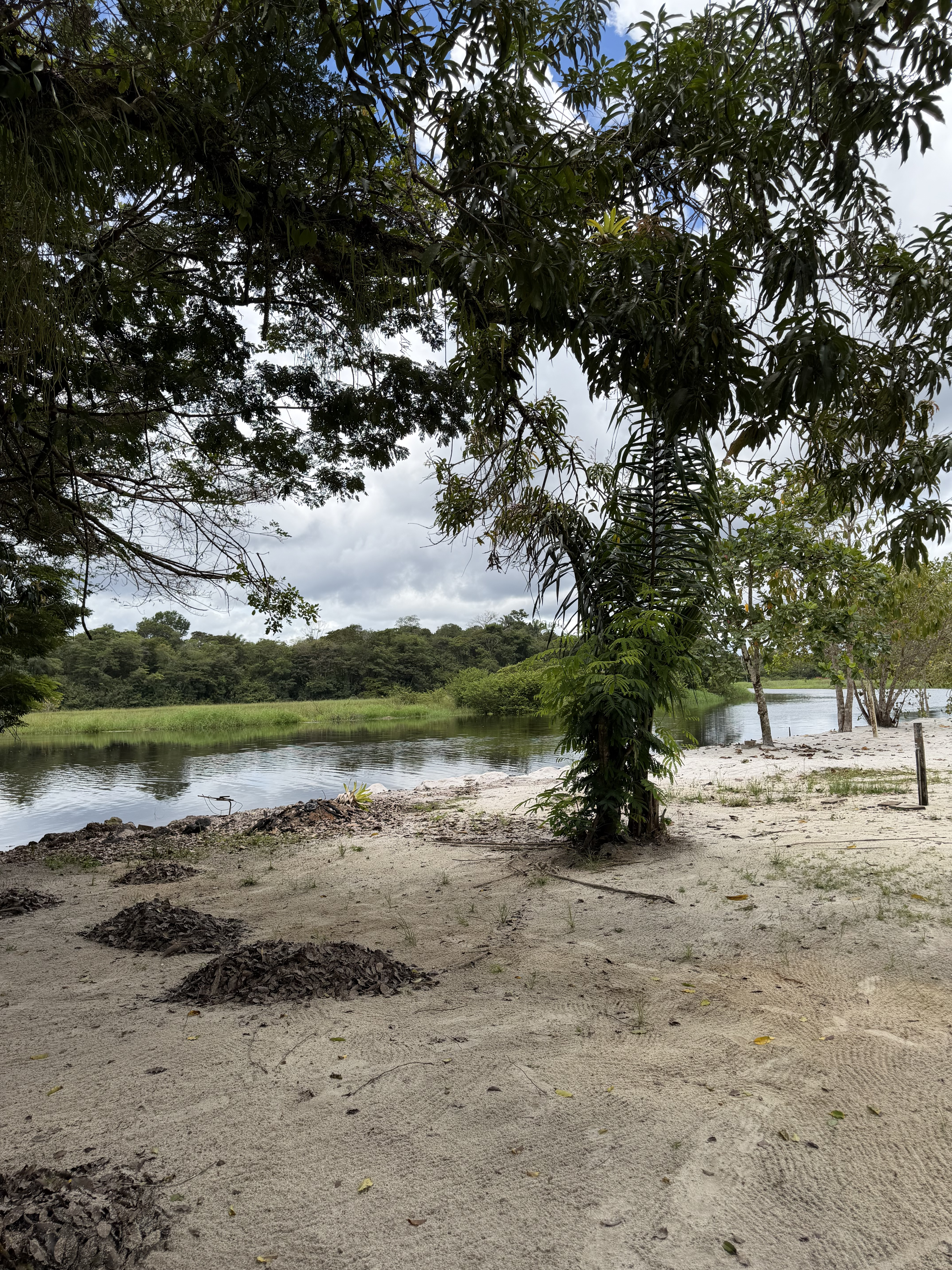
Coropinakreek near Bersaba (2026)

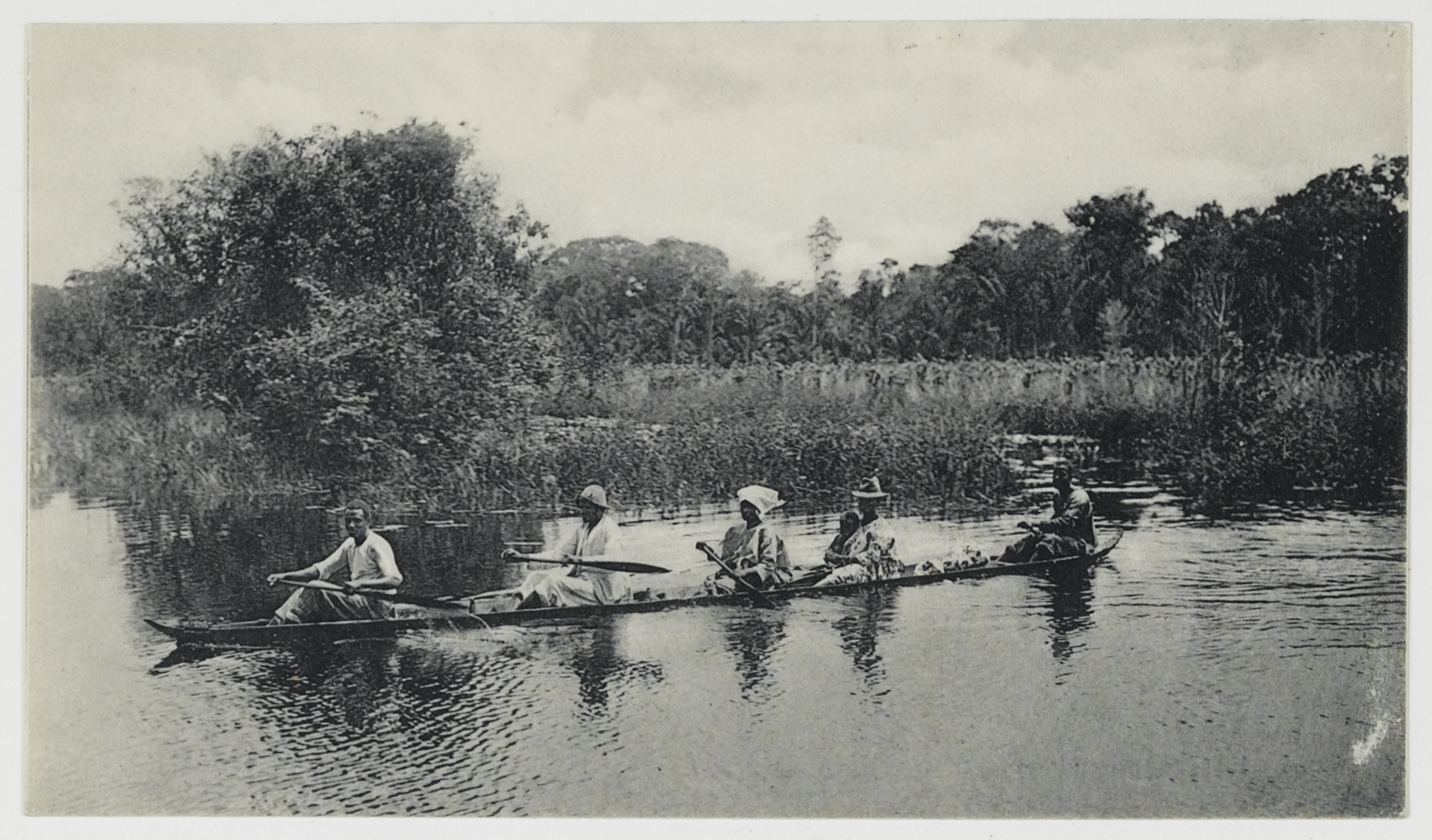
Canoe in the Coropina Creek (before 1920)

== See also ==
- List of rivers of Suriname
- Para District
- Cola Creek
- Para Creek
