= Cola Creek =

River in Suriname

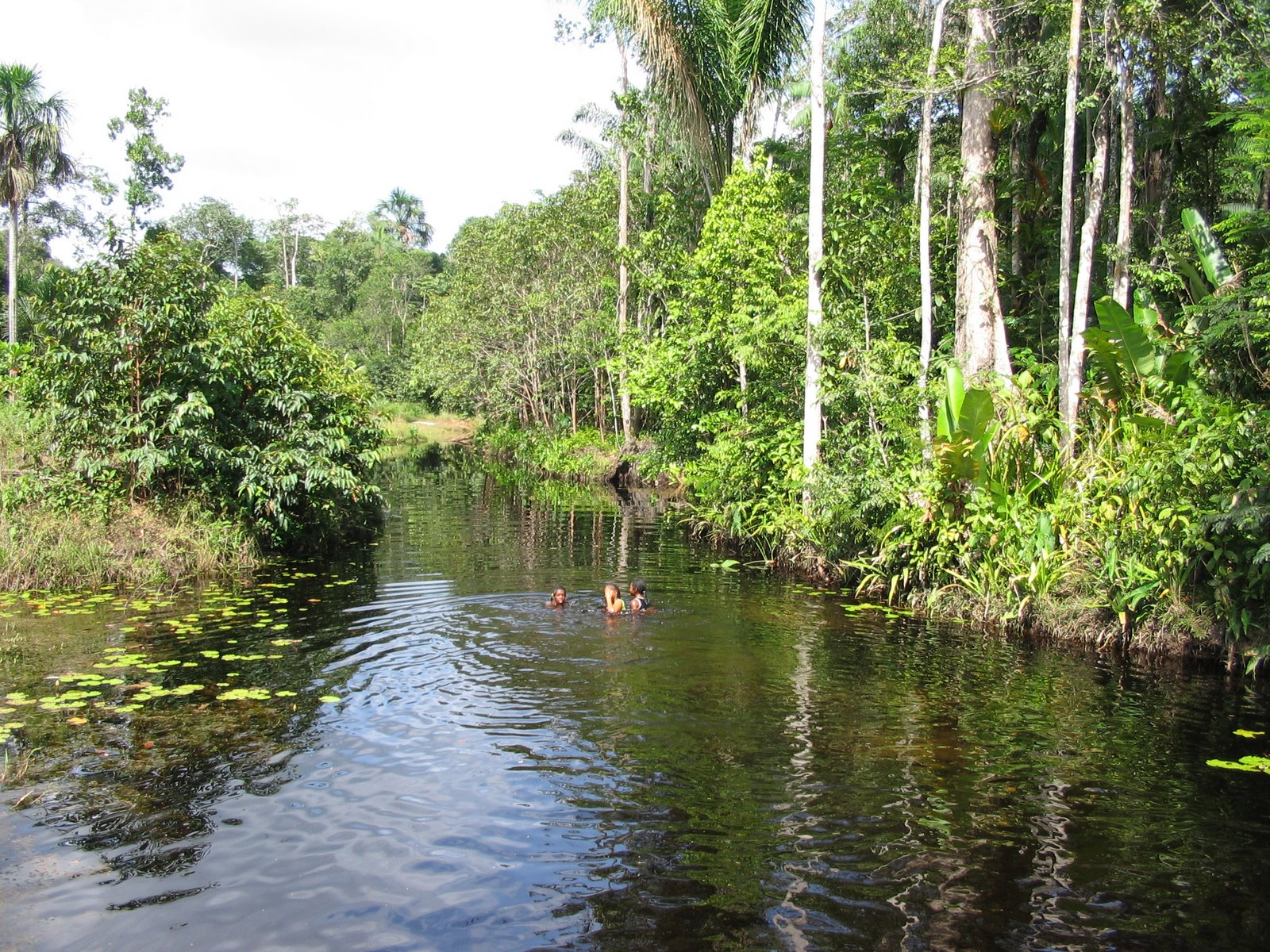

- Native name: Colakreek (Dutch)

Location
- Country: Suriname
- District: Para

Physical characteristics
- Source
  - coordinates: 5.463056°N 55.229722°W
- Mouth: Caropina Creek

Basin features
- Progression: Para Creek→Suriname River→Atlantic Ocean

Cola Creek (Dutch: Colakreek) is a blackwater creek in Suriname's Para District. The name refers to the colour of the water, which resembles that of Coca-Cola. On weekends many tourists visit the creek from Paramaribo as it is only a short drive away. The resort on the creek was built during World War II for the American soldiers stationed at Zanderij.

== See also ==
- Coropina Kreek
