= Berlijn =

Berlijn may refer to:

- the Dutch name for Berlin, the capital city, a municipality, and a state in Germany.
- Dick Berlijn (1950), a Dutch general
- Berlijn, Suriname, a village
