= Paranam =

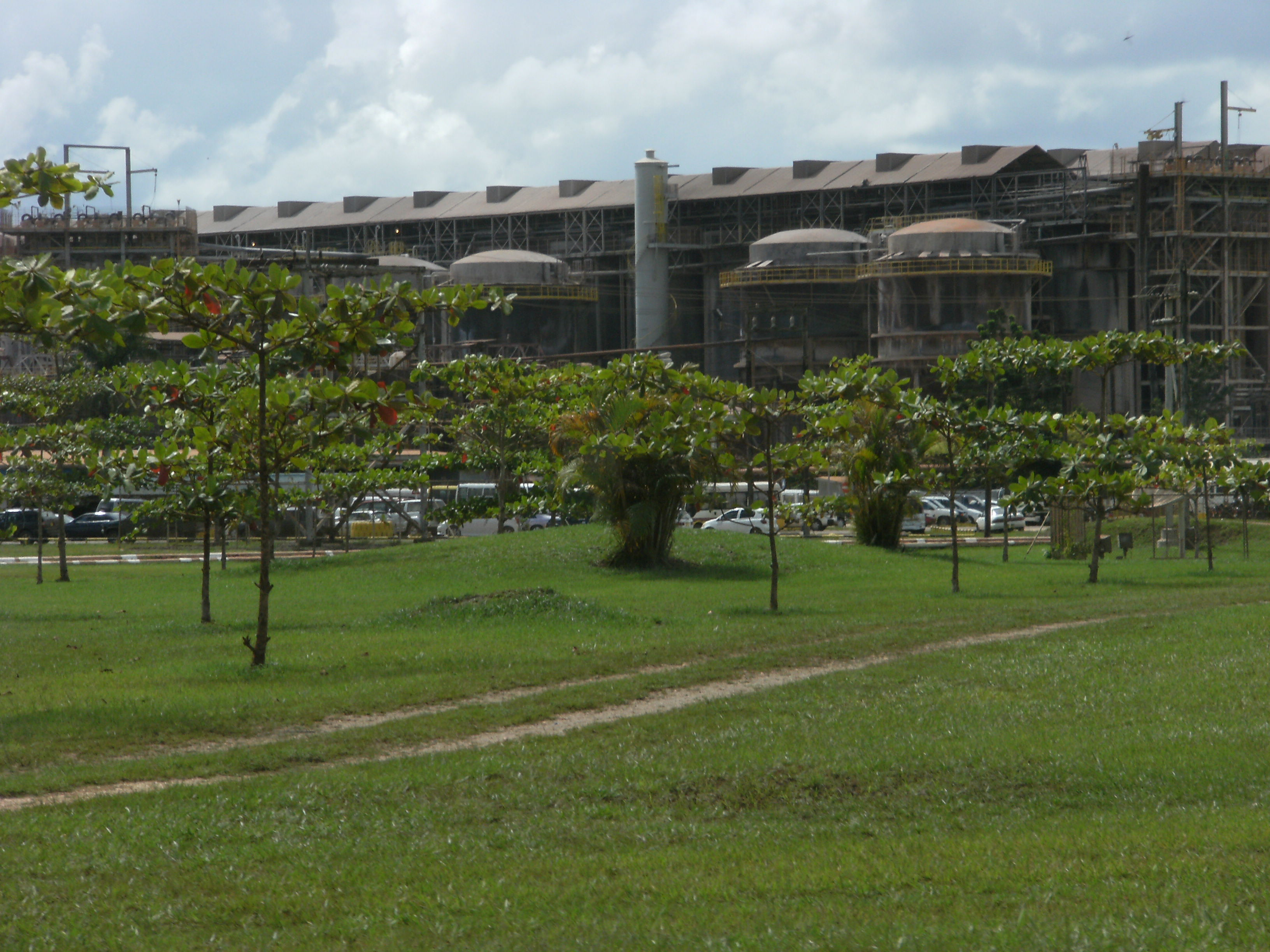
- Suralco bauxite factory at Paranam

- Location within Suriname
- Coordinates: 5°36′26″N 55°5′24″W
- Country: Suriname
- District: Para District
- Resort: Oost
- Time zone: UTC-3 (ART)

Paranam is a town in the Para District, Suriname. Paranam was created in 1938 for a bauxite factory. In 1965, an aluminium smelter was added. The factories closed down in 2017.

== History ==
There used to be a little hamlet called Klein Curaçao at the location. Paranam was created in 1938 when Alcoa began building a plant to support new mining areas along the Suriname River. Built on a former plantation, the facility was called Paranam after the Para and Suriname Rivers which border the mining concession areas. The Paranam mine began operations in 1941. Alcoa operates worldwide through joint ventures, and the operation in Suriname is called The Suriname Aluminum Company (or Suralco). A market and a theatre were built in town, however most workers remained in Paramaribo.

In 1965, an aluminium smelter was opened in Paranam which operated on the electricity generated by the Afobaka Dam. The smelter converts bauxite to produce approximately 3,150 metric tons of alumina each day at this location. Paranam became the first location in the world with an integrated system where the earth was transformed into aluminium. In 2015, Alcoa announced that it was going to close the factories, because the local supplies were exhausted, and the factories could not handle the bauxite from the Bakhuis Mountains. The factories closed down in 2017.

== Harbour ==
Due to the deep water available on the Suriname River, Paranam is a port accessible to oceangoing ships. A pilot is required.

== Notable people ==
- Hélène Ramjiawan (1952–2021), children's book author
