= Hollandse Kamp =

- Village
- Location within Suriname
- Coordinates: 5.447222°N 55.199167°W
- Country: Suriname
- District: Para District
- Resort: Zuid

Government
  - Captain: Sergio Jubithana (acting since July 2021)

Population (2022)
  - Total: 385
- Time zone: UTC-3 (AST)

Hollandse Kamp is an Indigenous village of Lokono Amerindians in the resort of Zuid in the Para District in Suriname. The village is located south of the Johan Adolf Pengel International Airport.

== Overview ==
Hollandse Kamp translates to Dutch camp. The name refers to a military camp located to the south of the village which was built during World War II. The military camp is still in use by the Suriname National Army, and is nowadays called Ayoko barracks.

Hollandse Kamp has a health care clinic. In 2018, the village received access to clean drinking water.

The village chief was Theo Jubitana. In 2017, Jubitana became President of Vereniging van Inheemse Dorpshoofden in Suriname (Association of Indigenous Village Chiefs In Suriname), the political pressure group for the indigenous population. Jubitana died on 20 July 2021.

Hollandse Kamp together with neighbouring Witsanti are at the centre of an indigenous land conflict. The Johan Adolf Pengel International Airport wants to expand the airport, and laid a claim on land belonging to Hollandse Kamp. Hollandse Kamp however, refers to maps from 1735 onwards where the area is marked as "Free Indian" territory.
