= Matta, Suriname =

Matta Korhopa (Arawak) Mata (Eastern Maroon Creole)
- Village
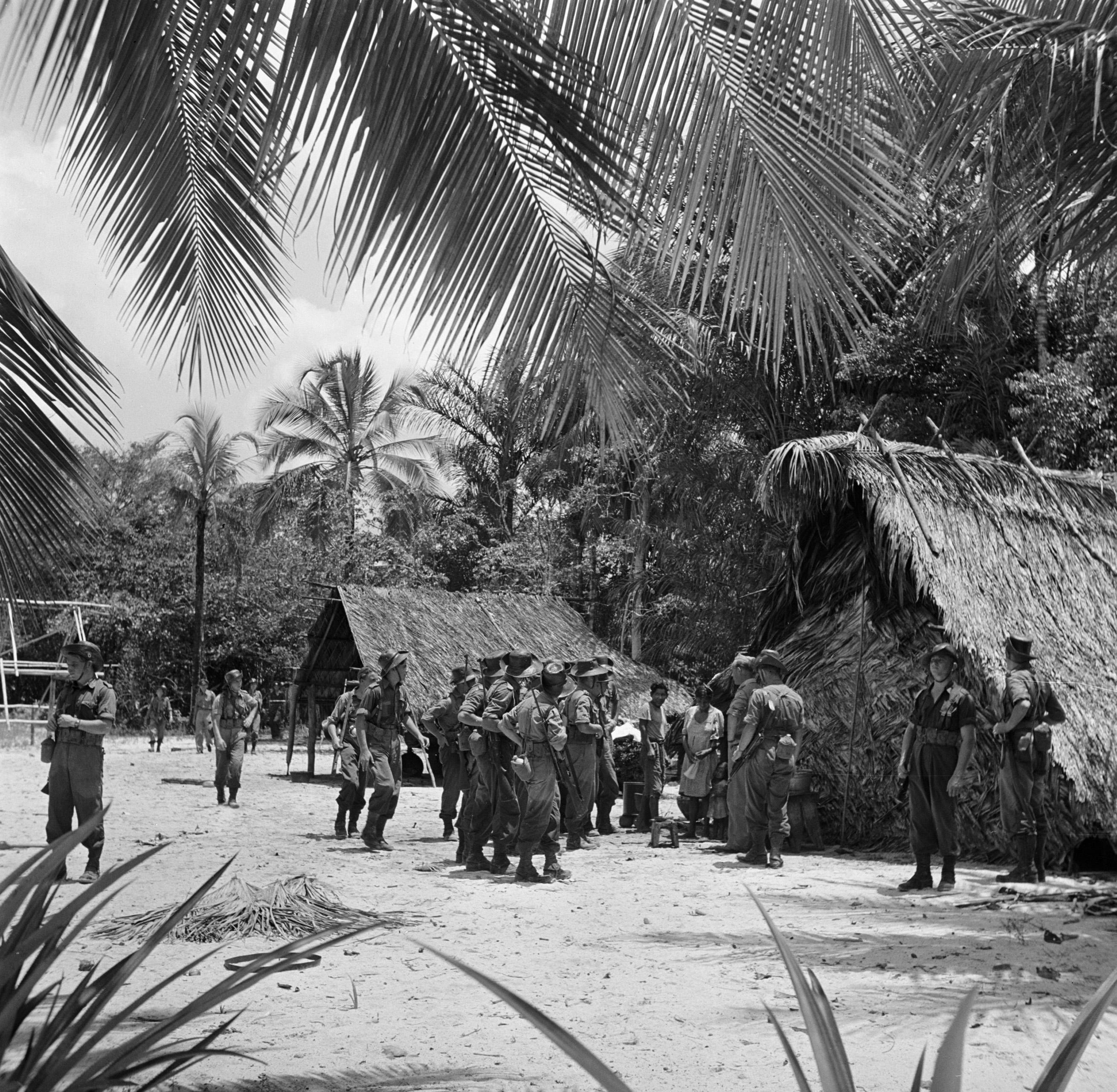
- Soldiers in Matta (1947)

- Location within Suriname
- Coordinates: 5.4525°N 55.322778°W
- Country: Suriname
- District: Para District
- Resort: Zuid

Government
  - Captain: Wendeline Sabajo

Population (2022)
  - Total: 500
- Time zone: UTC-3 (AST)

Matta (Arawak: Korhopa, Eastern Maroon Creole: Mata) also known as Matta Karupa is an Indigenous village of Lokono Amerindians in the resort of Zuid in the Para District in Suriname. The village can be accessed from a road which branches off the Southern East-West Link.

== Overview ==
Matta has a school and a clinic. Matta is connected to the road network of Suriname, however, the road was unpaved. In 2012, the government promised to pave the road. In August 2018, the road was finally upgraded. The economy of the village is mainly based on growing cassava.

The village has been allocated a communal forest. In 2018, 203 hectares of the forest were awarded to Creditmarket Investment Company NV, which had already started to clear the forest to make way for a planned industrial estate.

== Murder of Captain Karwofodi ==
On 13 August 2020, Captain Michael Karwofodi (67), the village chief, was murdered. On 16 August, six teenagers aged 13 to 18 were arrested, and have confessed to the murder. They were from the village and had been removed from the community house by the chief for misbehaving. They confessed that they intended to rob Karwofodi of his money and jewelry. On 21 June 2022, Raphael S, the leader of the group, was sentenced to 12 years for murder and robbery.
