= Onverdacht =

- Village
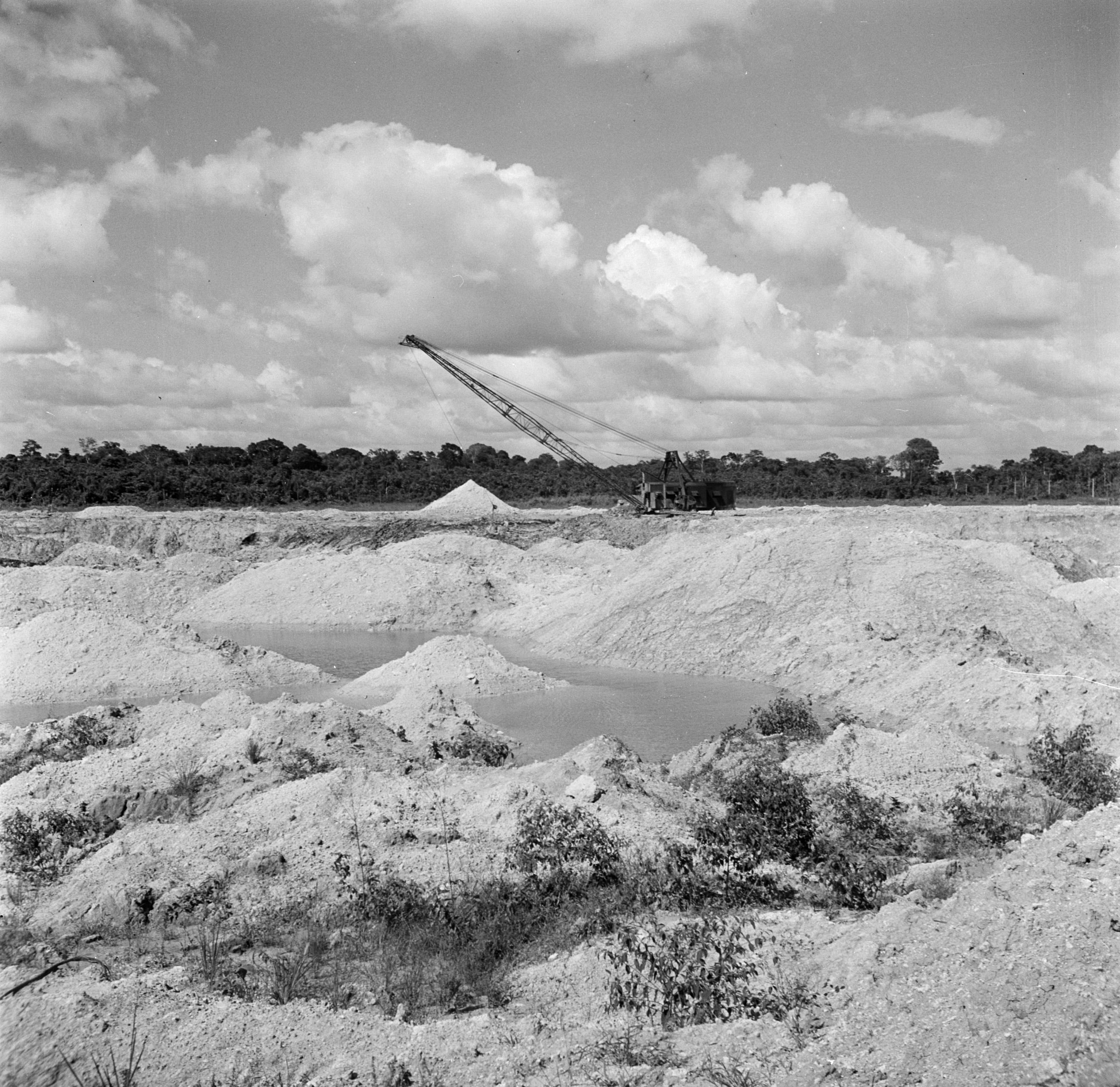
- Bauxite mining at Onverdacht (1947)

- Location within Suriname
- Coordinates: 5.612222°N 55.151111°W
- Country: Suriname
- District: Para District
- Resort: Zuid
- Time zone: UTC-3 (AST)

Onverdacht is a village in the resort of Zuid in the Para District of Suriname. Between 1941 and 2009, it was a bauxite mining town.

== History ==
Onverdacht started as a wood plantation in 1737. In 1863, the slaves were emancipated, and the plantation closed. In 1874, the land reverted to the Surinamese government.

In 1939, bauxite was discovered at Onverdacht by the Dutch Billiton company (nowadays part of BHP). In 1941, a concession was granted to start mining at Onverdacht. A prefab housing estate was built near the village to accommodate the workers, however Onverdacht remained relatively small due to its proximity to Paramaribo. In 1947, a recreation centre opened. In 1949, a school opened. A library, and a fire department opened as well.

In 1993, Billiton signed a joint venture with Suralco (Alcoa), and in 2009 closed their operations in Suriname. In 2018, the police station closed down.
