= Zuid, Suriname =

Coordinates: 5°26′58″N 55°16′12″W

- Resort
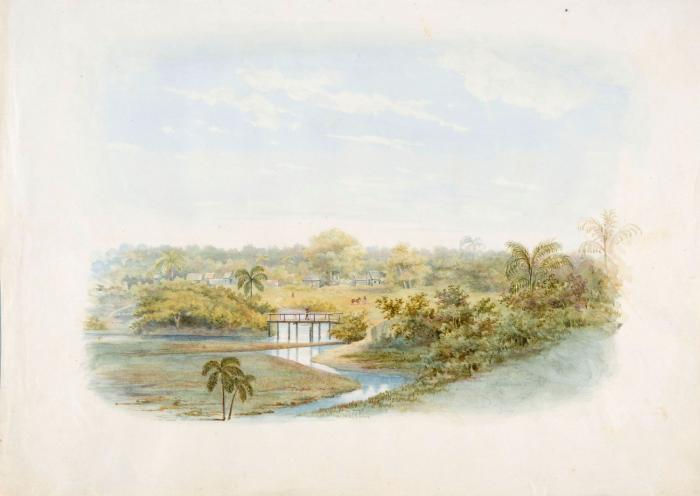
- Watercolor painting of plantation Berlijn

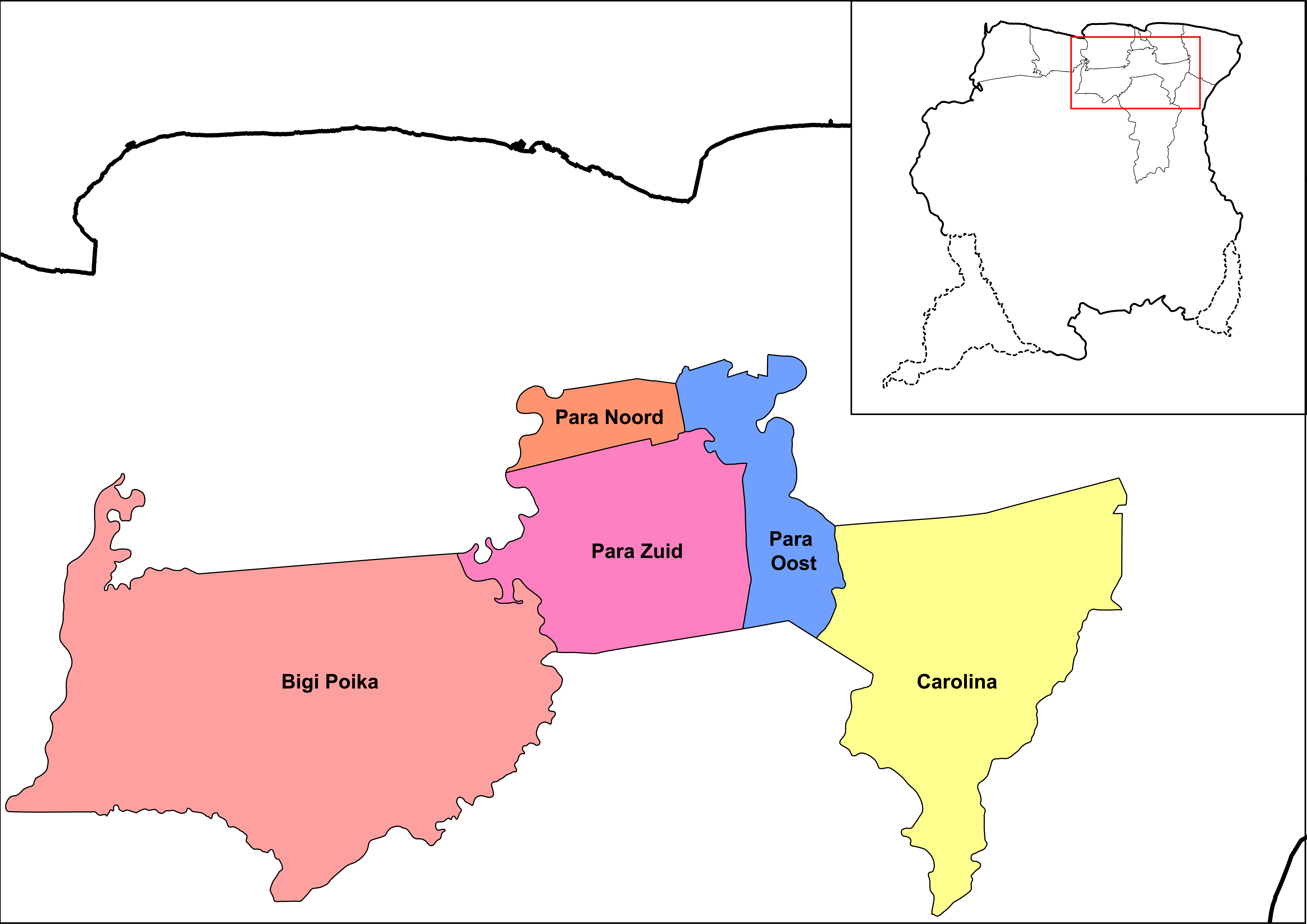
- Map showing the resorts of Para District. Zuid
- Country: Suriname
- District: Para District

Area
  - Total: 909 km^{2} (351 sq mi)

Population (2012)
  - Total: 6,113
  - Density: 6.72/km^{2} (17.4/sq mi)
- Time zone: UTC-3 (AST)

Zuid (English: South) is a resort in Suriname, located in the Para District. Its population at the 2012 census was 6,113. The main ethnic groups are Indigenous, Creoles, and mixed race.

Villages which are located in Zuid are Berlijn, Cabendadorp, Hollandse Kamp, Matta, Onverdacht, Pikin Saron, Sabakoe, Witsanti and Zanderij which is near the Johan Adolf Pengel International Airport, the main airport of Suriname.

== Republiek ==
Republiek is a village, and a holiday resort in Zuid. Republiek consists of the two wood plantation Mijnhoop and Valkenburg which were merged in 1884 into Republiek. The name is based on Post Republiek, a military outpost which already existed in 1793. The military outpost was manned by 24 freed slaves at the time. In 1905, the first part of the Lawa Railway between Paramaribo and Republiek opened. The railway station turned Republiek in a holiday resort. In 1987, the train station closed, but Republiek remained a holiday resort. The village is home to about 50 people. Since 1933, Republiek provides the drinking water for Paramaribo and Wanica.
