= Onverwacht, Suriname =

Onverwacht
- District capital
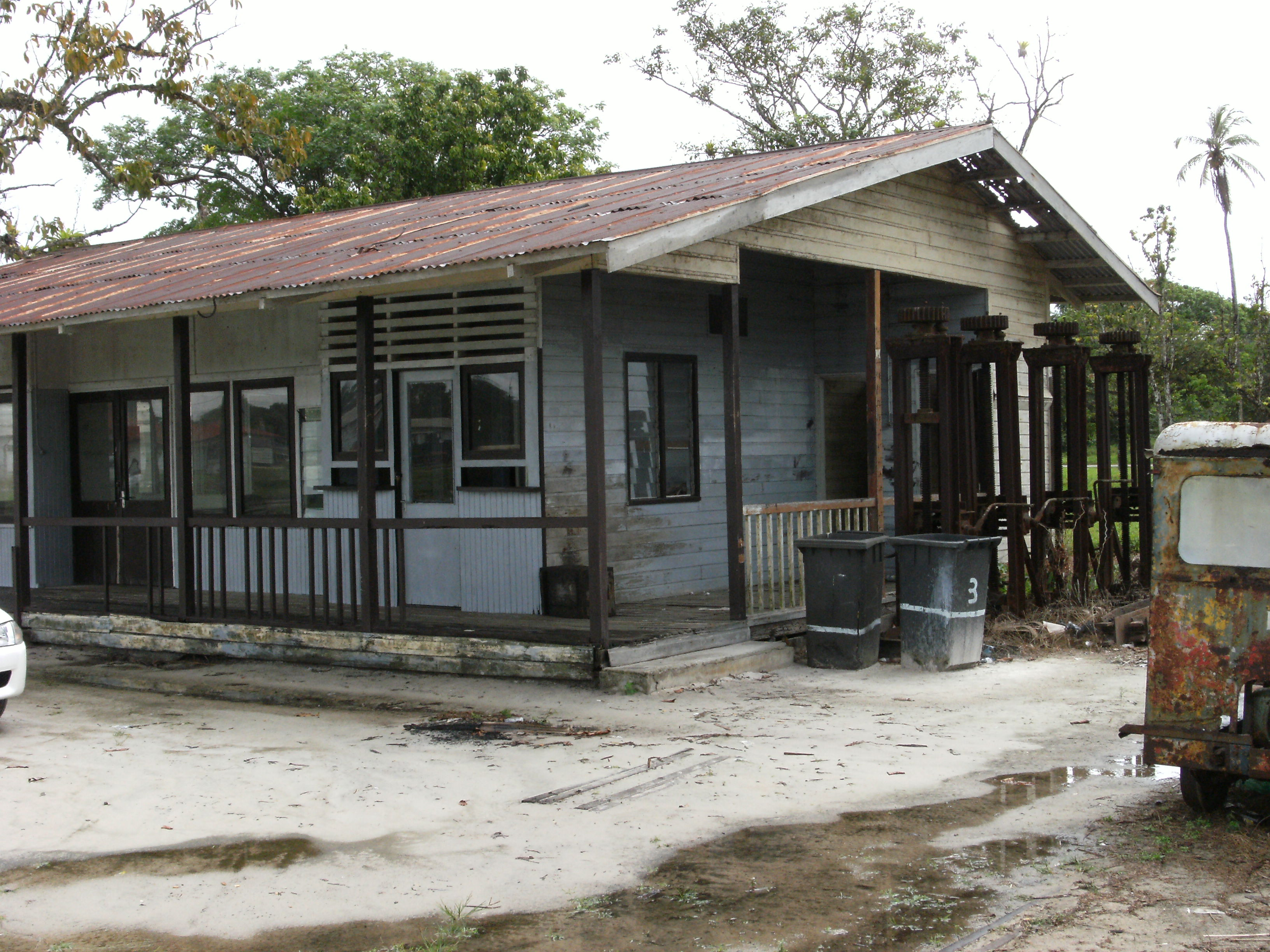
- Building at the Onverwacht railway station

- Location within Suriname
- Coordinates: 5°35′35″N 55°11′38″W
- Country: Suriname
- District: Para District
- Resort: Noord
- Elevation: 10 m (33 ft)

Population (2008)
  - Total: 2,223
- Time zone: UTC-3 (ART)

Onverwacht (Dutch for "unexpected") is the capital town of Para District, Suriname.

Onverwacht started as a wood plantation with the same name and has existed as early as 1667. On 18 May 1881, the plantation was sold to eight former slaves. In 1910 the Lawa Railway passed through the area and a station was opened. In 1936, a road, currently named Indira Gandhiweg, was built parallel to the railway line to connect Paramaribo with Onverwacht. During World War II, the road was extended to Johan Adolf Pengel International Airport. In 1968, Onverwacht became the capital of the newly formed Para District. In 1987, the last train departed and the station at Onverwacht closed.

== Notable people ==
- Humbert Boerleider (1935-2016), football manager and player.
