= Pontoetoe =

Village in Sipaliwini District, Suriname

- Former village
- Location in Suriname
- Coordinates: 3°15′14″N 55°25′3″W
- Country: Suriname
- District: Sipaliwini District
- Resort (municipality): Tapanahony

Pontoetoe was a village in the Sipaliwini District of Suriname, situated on the banks of the Paloemeu River. The village was inhabited by the Indigenous Wayana.

Pontoetoe was visited on 8 November 1904 by the Tapanahony expedition. In 1940, the village was reported as abandoned after being surveyed in an aerial reconnaissance mission.
