= Para District =

District of Suriname

- District
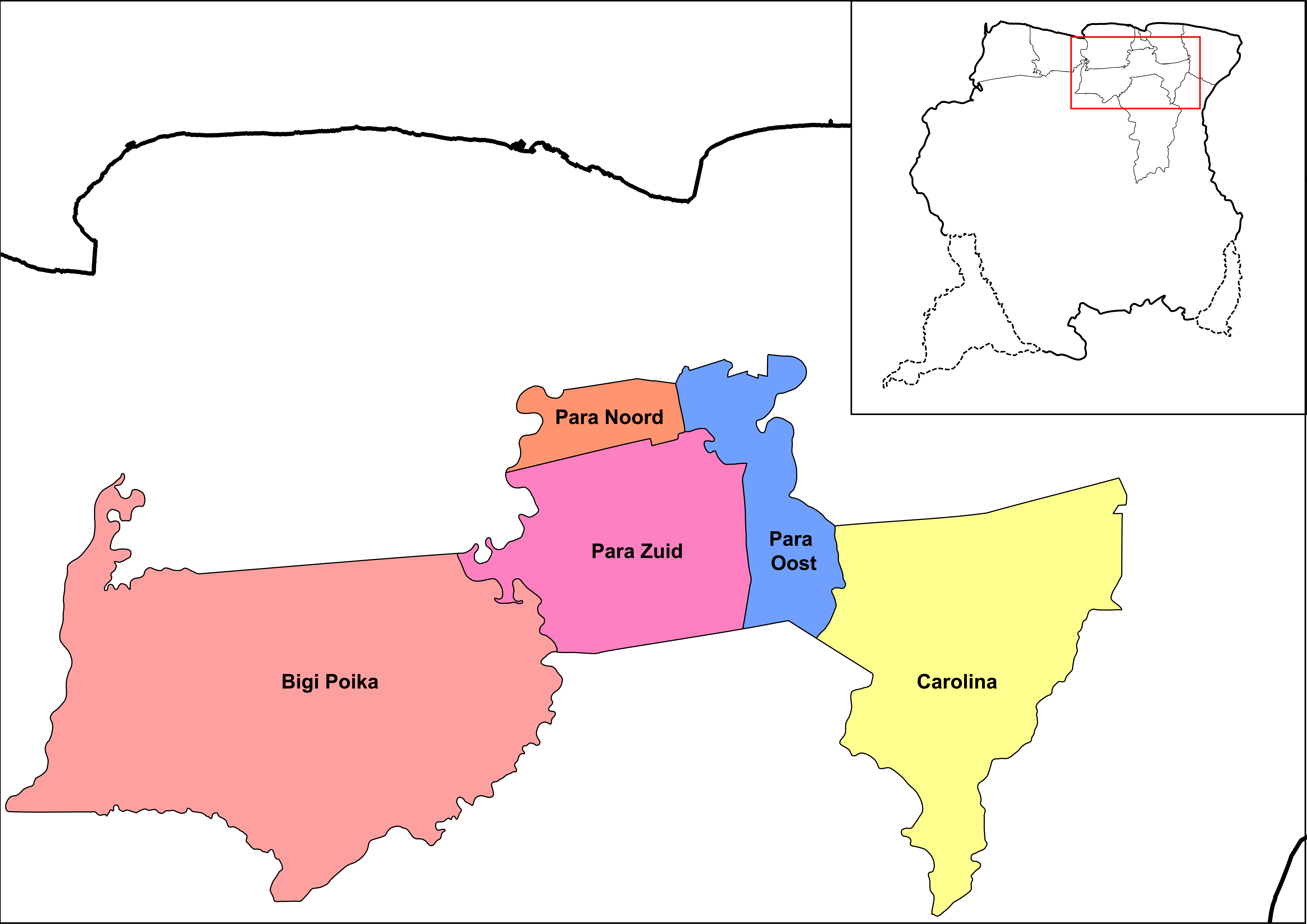
- Resorts in Para

- Map of Suriname showing Para district
- Coordinates: 5°26′N 55°13′W
- Country: Suriname
- District: Para
- Capital: Onverwacht

Area
  - Total: 5,393 km^{2} (2,082 sq mi)

Population (2012 census)
  - Total: 24,700
  - Density: 4.58/km^{2} (11.9/sq mi)
- Time zone: UTC-3
- ISO 3166 code: SR-PR

Para is a district of northern Suriname. Para's capital city is Onverwacht, with other towns including Paranam, and Zanderij. Para has a population of 24,700 and an area of 5,393 km^{2}. The district is the mining and forestry centre of Suriname, with many large bauxite mining operations operating. The district is a mixture of forest and savannas.

== History ==
The northern part of Para is one of the oldest cultivated areas of Suriname, and has been home to sugar and tobacco plantation since the 17th century which were mainly located along the Suriname River and the Para Creek. The southern part of the district contained wood plantations, and is still in use by logging companies. In 1968, the District was established, and named after the Para Creek. In 1983, the District was quadrupled in size.

The district used to be accessible only by boat. The discovery of gold in Brokopondo and Sipaliwini lead to the construction of the Lawa Railway and growth of the villages next to the railway line. The railway line was decommissioned in 1986.

During World War II American troops were stationed in Suriname. The existing airport at Zorg en Hoop was insufficient, and the airstrip at Zanderij, was upgraded to a major airport. In 1936, a road, currently named Indira Gandhiweg, had been built parallel to the railway line to connect Paramaribo with Onverwacht, which was extended to the airport. In the 1960s, the Avobakaweg was constructed to provide access to the south of the country.

The ruins of the city of Jodensavanne are in Para district. Jews fleeing the Spanish Inquisition established Jodensavanne in the 17th century, but it was destroyed in 1832 by a fire. Jodensavanne was an internment camp for suspected Nazi supporters from the Dutch East Indies during the Second World War.

Para is home to several indigenous villages from the Carib and Arawak tribes.

== Economy ==
The main part of the economy is the bauxite mining. Gold also plays a major role in the economy of Para. The main roads and airport have resulted in companies moving into Para. Agriculture is mainly focused on cassava, asparagus bean and pineapples. Tourism has seen a steady growth over the 20th and 21st centuries. There are several holiday resorts in the district, and White Beach in Oost is becoming a main attraction.

== Resorts ==
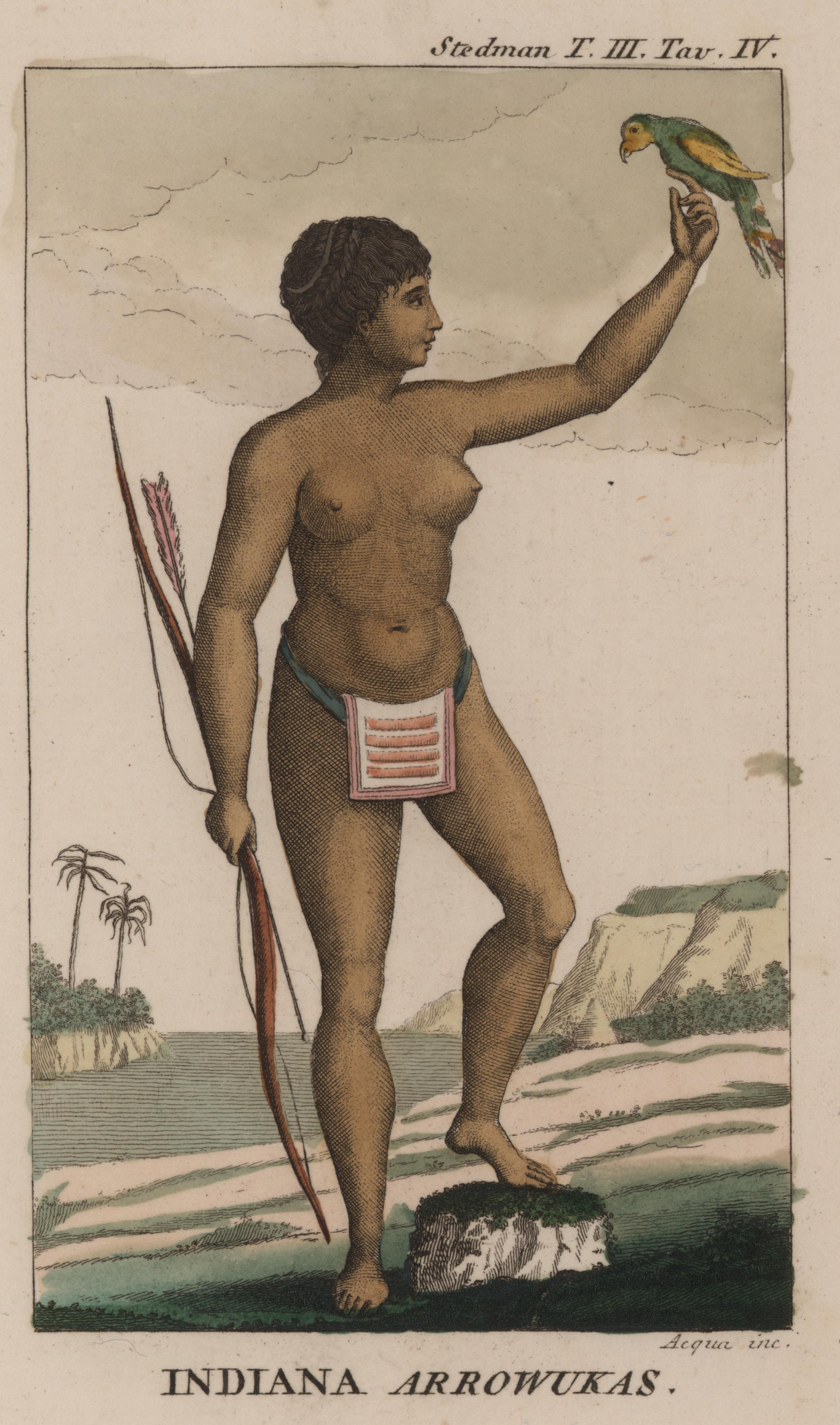
Arowak woman

Para is divided into 5 resorts (ressorten):

- Bigi Poika
- Carolina
- Noord
- Oost
- Zuid

== Villages ==
- Berlijn
- Bernharddorp
- Bethesda
- Cabendadorp
- Cassipora
- Hollandse Kamp
- Matta
- Onverdacht
- Onverwacht
- Paranam
- Pikin Saron
- Powakka
- Redi Doti
- Republiek
- Sabakoe
- Torarica
- Witsanti
- Zanderij

== Demographics ==
In the 2004 census, Para had 18,749 inhabitants. This rose in the 2012 census to 24,700 inhabitants, a 31.1% increase.

== See also ==
- Coropina Kreek

== Gallery ==
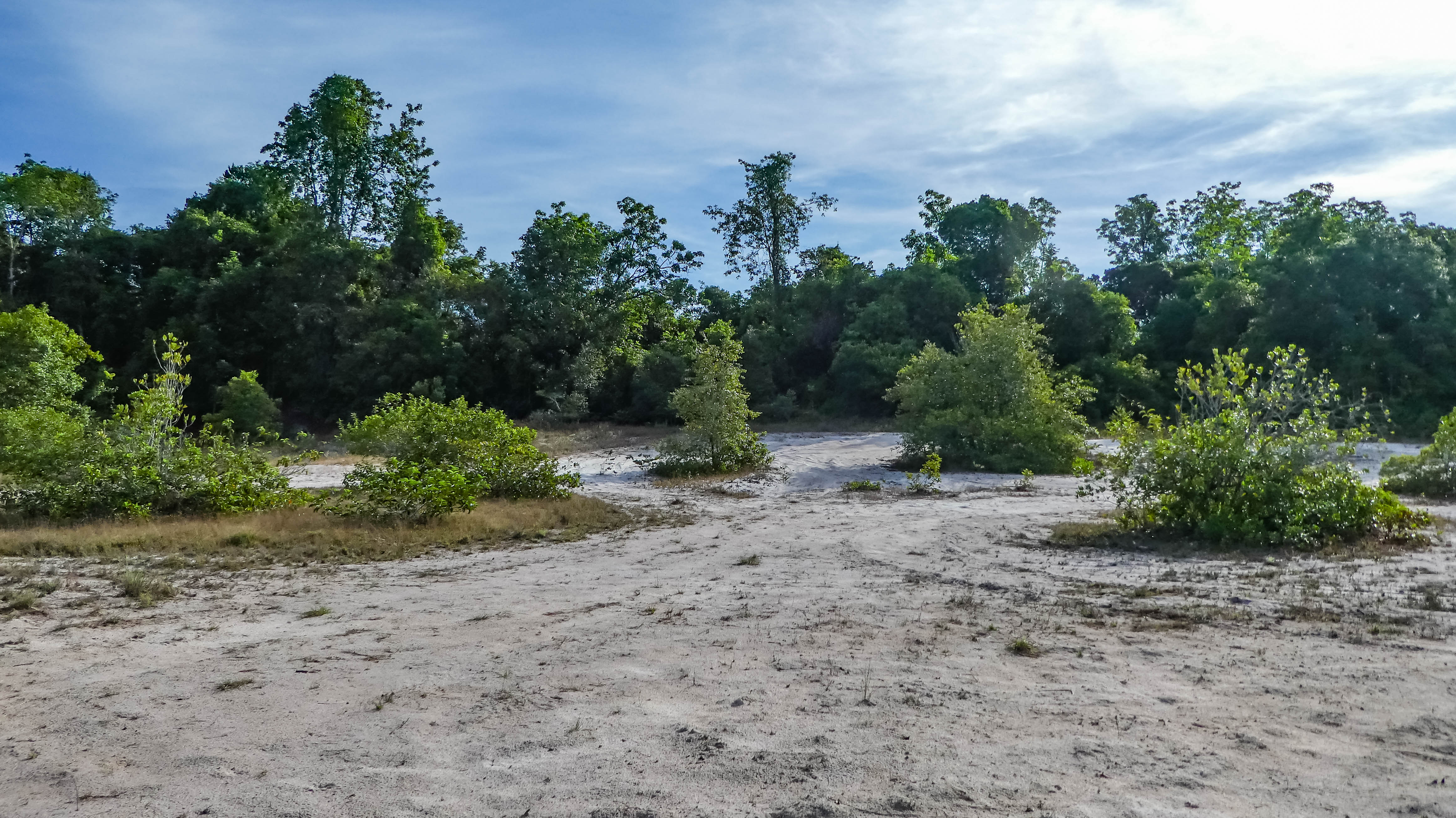
Savannah near Powakka

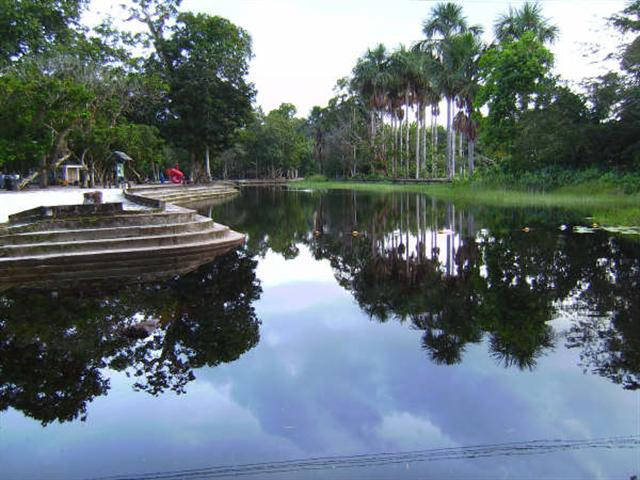
Cola Creek

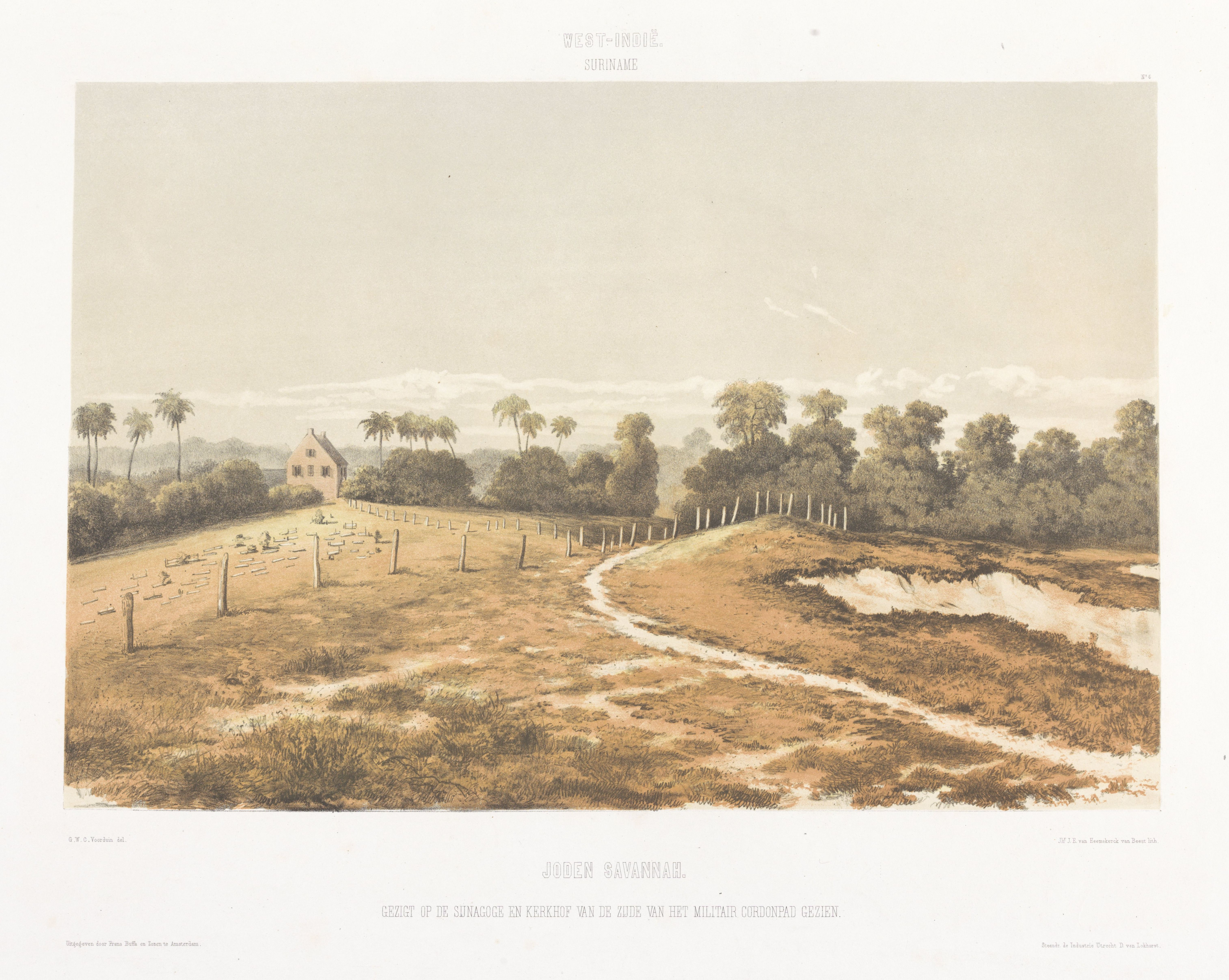
Jodensavanna (c. 1860)

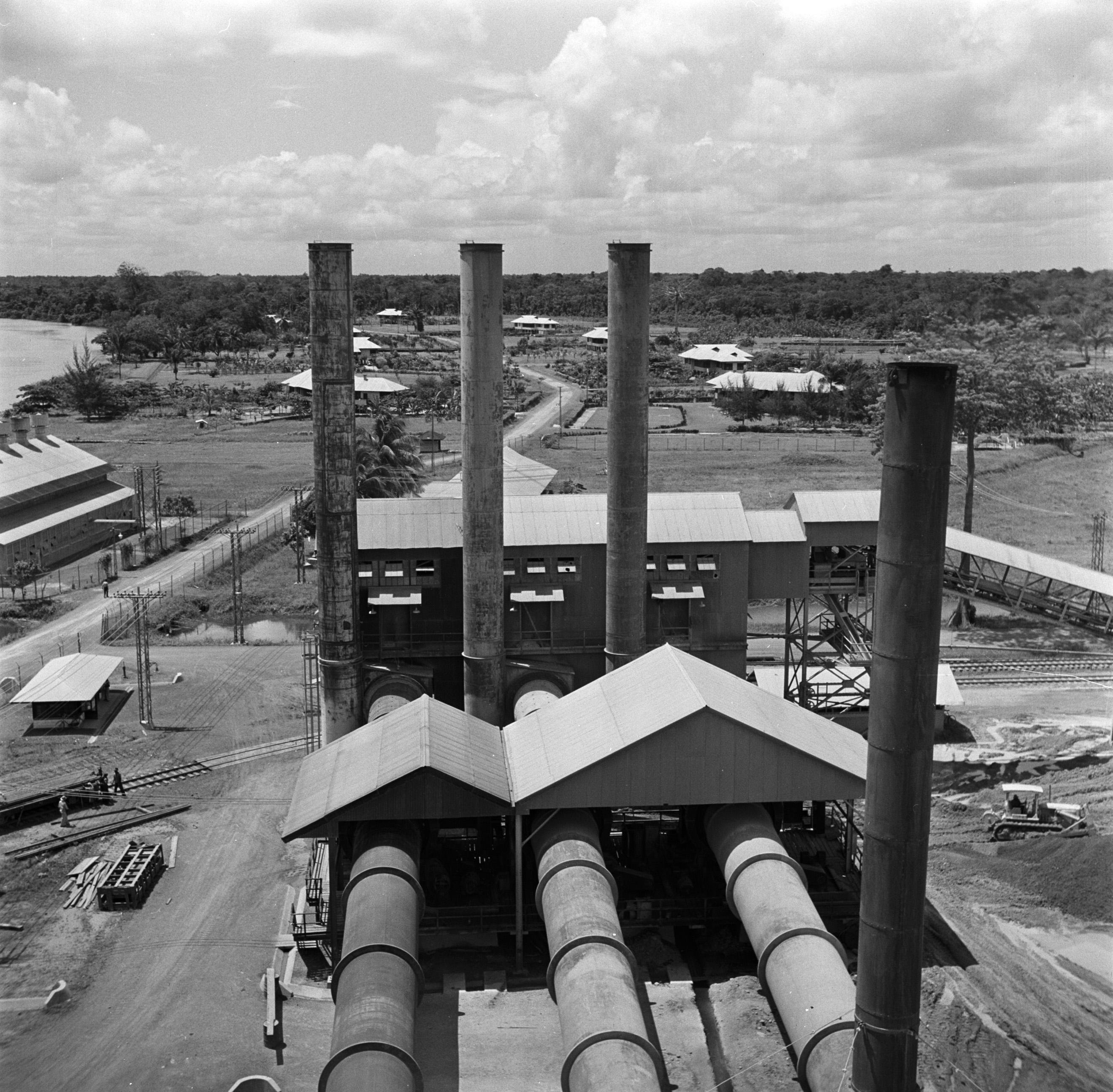
Bauxite factory in Paranam (1947)

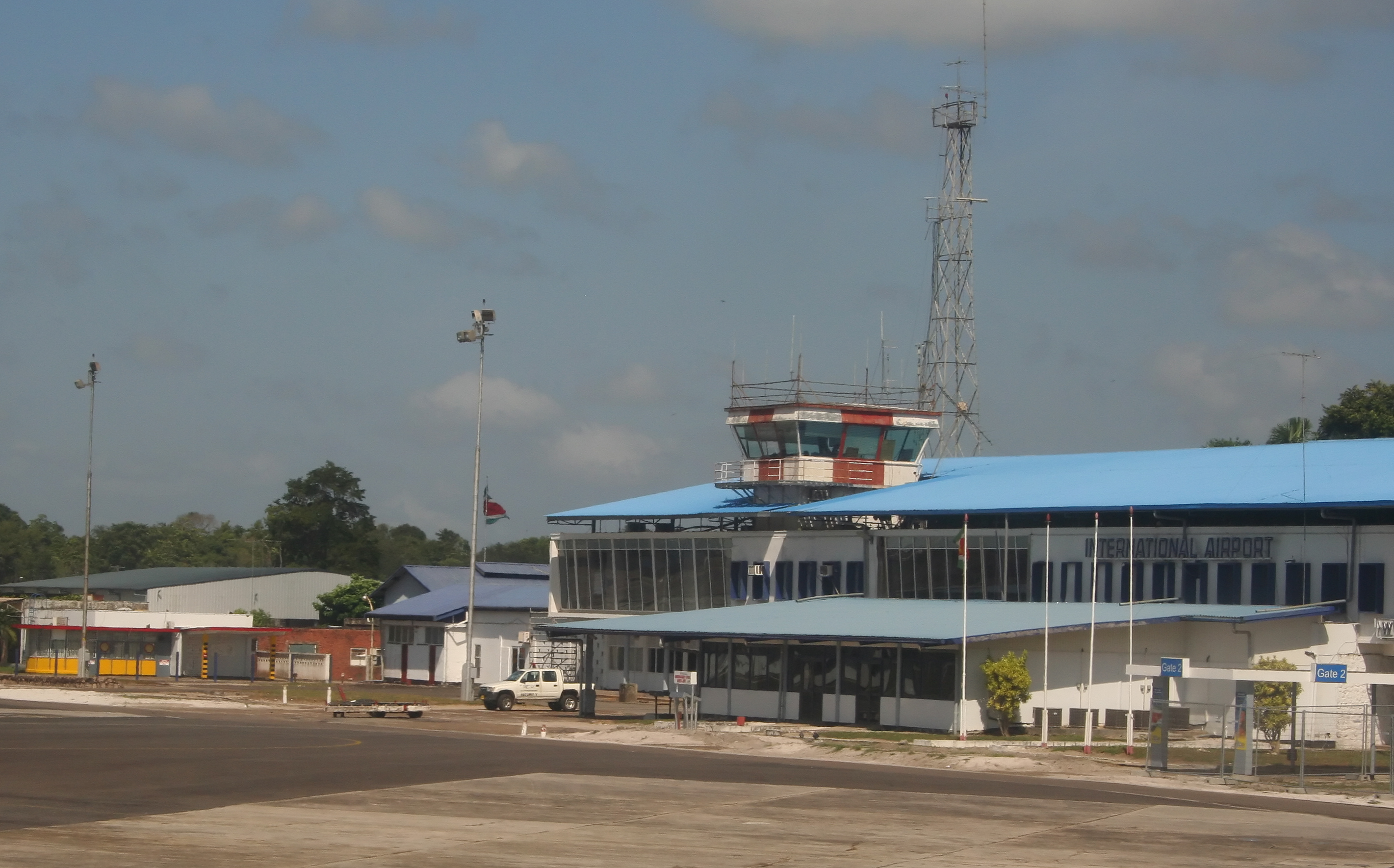
Johan Adolf Pengel International Airport

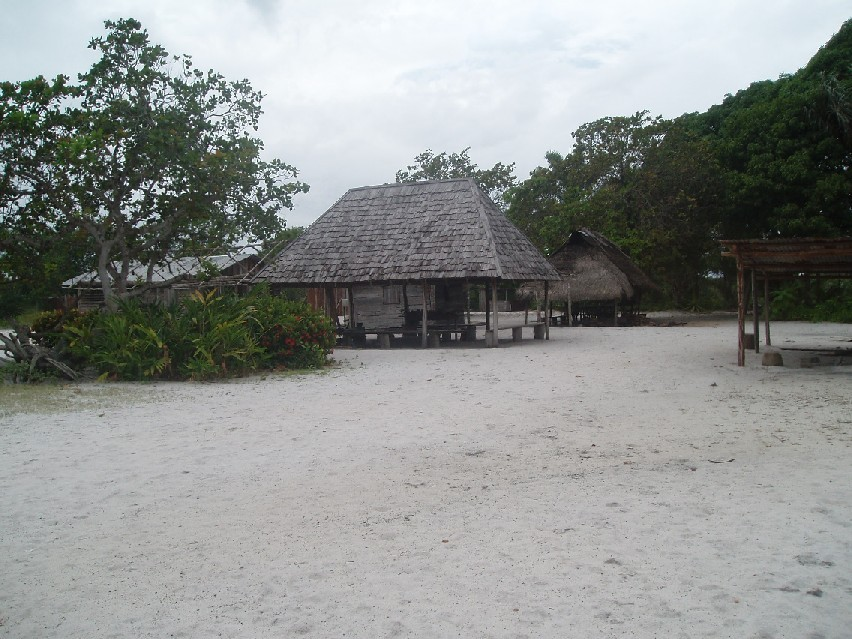
Amerindian village of Cabendadorp
