= Powakka =

- Village
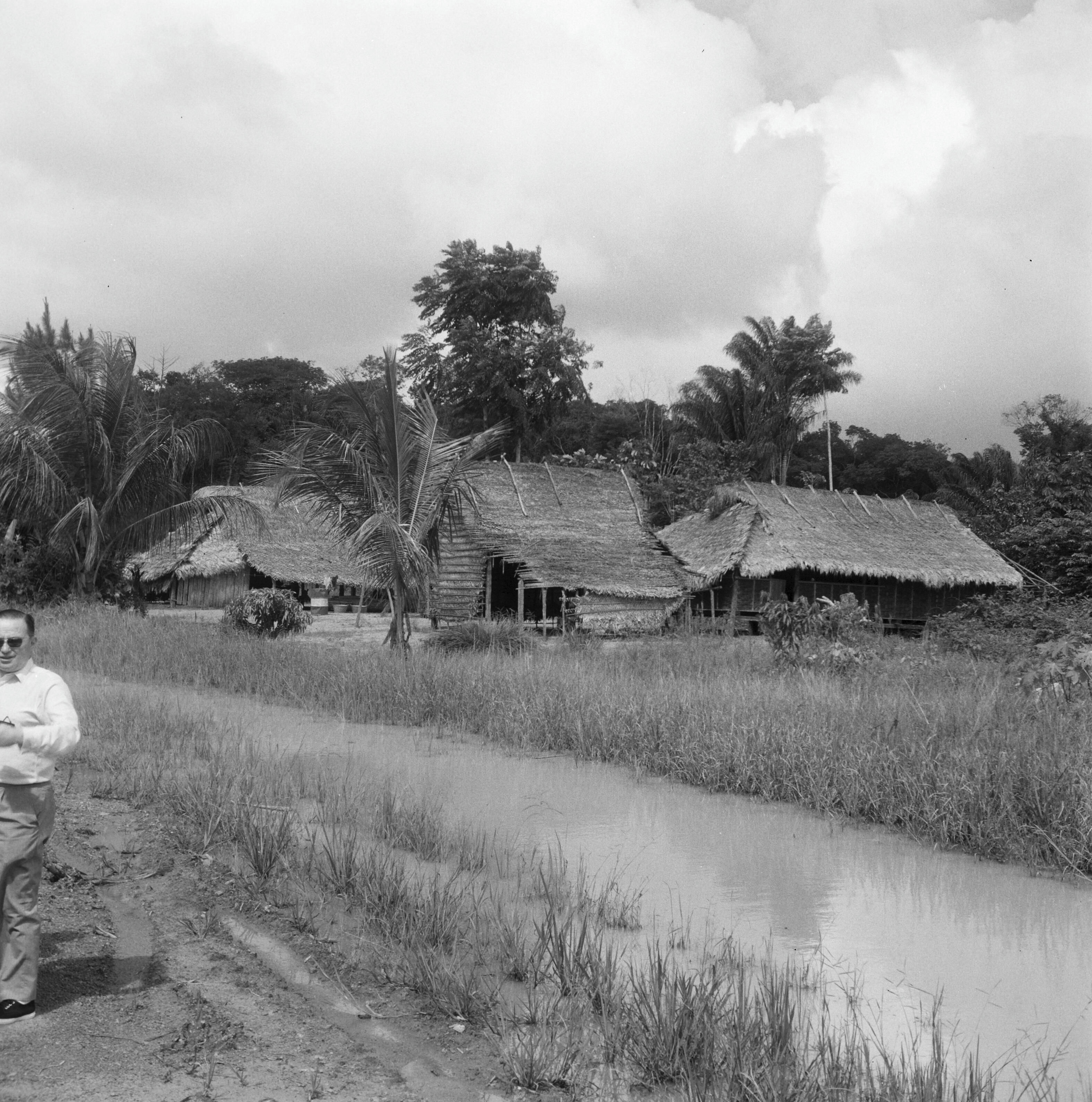
- Powakka (1971)

- Location within Suriname
- Coordinates: 5.449167°N 55.078889°W
- Country: Suriname
- District: Para District
- Resort: Oost

Government
  - Captain: Sergio Sabajo

Population (2022)
  - Total: 1,920
- Time zone: UTC-3 (AST)

Powakka is an Indigenous village of Lokono Amerindians in the resort of Oost in the Para District in Suriname. The village is located on the road to Carolina which connects to the Avobakaweg to Paramaribo.

== Overview ==
Powakka is located in a savanna area. The economy is mainly based on the production of pineapples, and tourism has become important as well. Several tourist resorts are located in Powakka. An animal husbandry project was started in the 1930s, however it only yielded limited success.

The Catholic mission has been active in the village since the late 18th century. The village has a school and a clinic. On 15 December 2020, Sergio Sabajo was elected as the village chief.

== Bibliography ==
- Planning Office (2014). "Planning Office Suriname - Districts" (PDF). Planning Office Suriname (in Dutch).
