= Pikin Saron =

- Village
- Location within Suriname
- Coordinates: 5.389444°N 55.359444°W
- Country: Suriname
- District: Para District
- Resort: Zuid

Government
  - Captain: Url Tapoto

Population (2020)
  - Total: 488
- Time zone: UTC-3 (AST)

Pikin Saron (also Post Saron) is an Indigenous village of Kalina Amerindians in the resort of Zuid in the Para District in Suriname. The village can be accessed from the Southern East-West Link, and is located on the Saramacca River.

== History ==
Pikin Saron was founded as a missionary post of the Moravian Church in 1756. It was located near the military outpost De Zeven Provinciën which became later known as Post Saron. The Amerindian were living in the savannah to the west of the post. The tribe was hunting escaped slaves for the colony for money. (Note: The Colony of Suriname paid the Amerindians ƒ 50,- for every captured slave, and ƒ 25,- for a cut-off right hand as proof of a killed slave.) In 1760, there were 84 Amerindians living in Saron. On 25 January 1761, the post was destroyed by the Saramaka Maroons. 8 Amerindians were killed in the attack, and 11 women and children were taken prisoner. On 19 September 1762, a peace treaty was signed between the Colony of Suriname and the Saramaka.

== Overview ==
Pikin Saron has a school and a clinic. The Saron Bridge over the Saramacca River is located near the village. In 2011, the wooden bridge was replaced by a concrete bridge.

In 2019, the Women Centre was renovated by Grassalco who operate a nearby gold mine. In 2009, samples were taken of the river, and the river has been polluted with mercury. In 2020, a police post was opened in the village. The village chief since 2010 is Url Tapoto.

== Bibliography ==
- Weiss, H. (1921). "De zending der herrnhutters onder de Indianen in Berbice en Suriname 1738-1816". New West Indian Guide / Nieuwe West-Indische Gids. De West-Indische Gids (in Dutch). 2: 187–197. doi:10.1163/22134360-90001814. S2CID 161594357.
