= Lawa Railway =

Railway in Suriname

Coordinates: 5.592875°N 55.195263°W

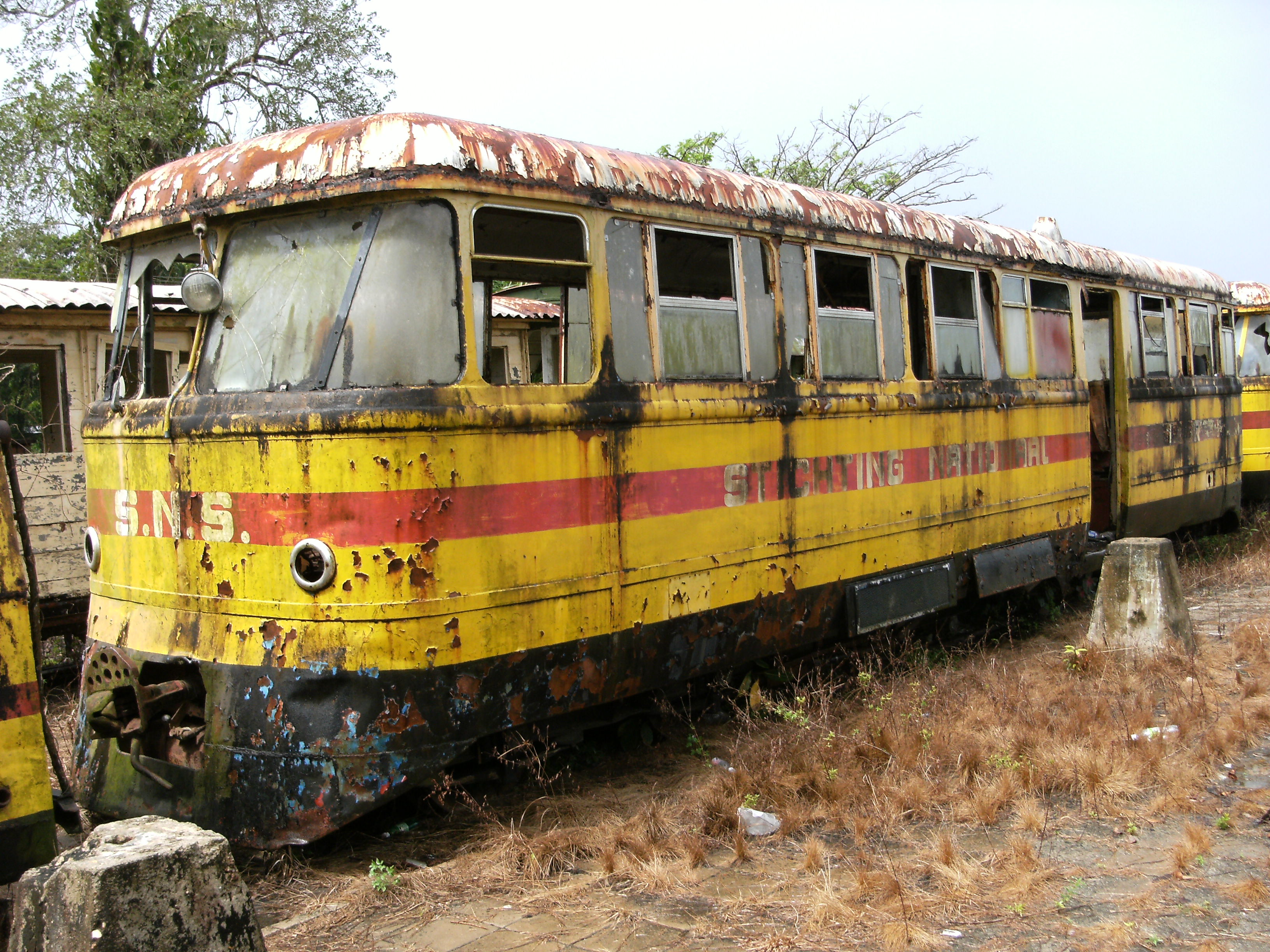
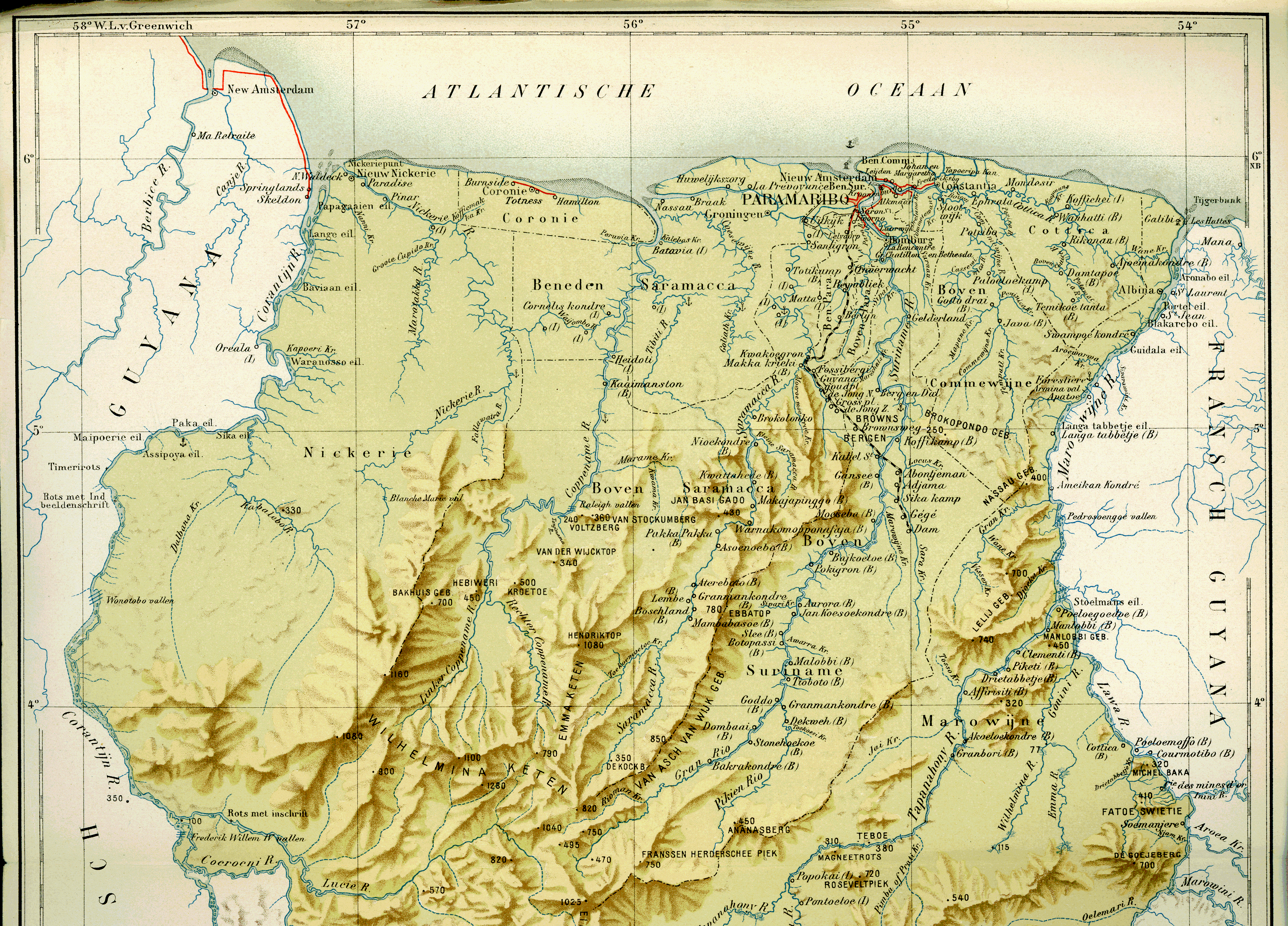
- Diesel railcar in the former station of Onverwacht Map of the line from Encyclopaedie van Nederlandsch West-Indië, published between 1914 and 1917

Technical
- Line length: Originally 173 km (107 1/2 mi)
- Track gauge: 1,000 mm (3 ft 3 3/8 in)

The Lawa Railway (Dutch: Lawaspoorweg or later Landsspoorweg) was a 173-kilometre-long (107 1/2 mi) single-track metre gauge railway in Suriname. It was built during the gold rush in the early 20th century, from the harbour town Paramaribo to Dam at the Sara Creek, but it was not extended to the gold fields at the Lawa River, as originally intended.

== History ==
Private businessmen came up with the first plans, and the Governor of Suriname Cornelis Lely announced in 1902 that the government would build the railway to facilitate the exploitation of the gold fields. The track was intended to be more than 350 kilometres (217 1/2 mi) long, but was built only halfway since the gold fields were not as productive as hoped for.

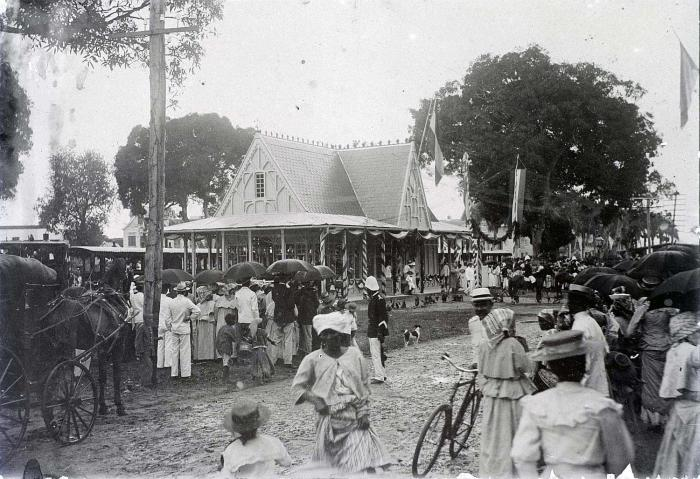
Inauguration of the railway at Vaillantsplein station in 1905

In 1903 former seamen from Curacao began building the track from Paramaribo to Republiek; this section opened in 1905. They completed the section to Dam at the Sara Creek in 1912. The rail track was by then 173 kilometres (107 1/2 mi) long and had cost 8.5 million Surinamese guilder. A 300-metre-long (330 yd) aerial cable car crossed the Suriname River, as building a bridge was considered too expensive. The passengers had to disembark the train at the Cable station (Kabelstation) and cross the river in a simple gondola lift. On the other side of the river, another train waited to bring them to the terminus at the Sara Creek.

When the Brokopondo Reservoir filled up in the 1960s, the track from Brownsberg Nature Park to the cable car was intentionally flooded and had to be taken out of use. The remainder was decommissioned in the 1980s. The last train departed in 1987.

In the 1990s Peter Sul of Lovers Rail tried to reuse the remaining 86 km (53.5 miles) for tourist trains, but failed to do so. Since then, some of the rolling stock rots away at the former Onverwacht station. The track in the jungle is overgrown and the section between Paramaribo and Onverwacht has been lifted.

== Rolling stock ==
Steam locomotives were used initially, but were replaced in 1954 by diesel railcars for passenger transport.

=== Steam locomotives ===
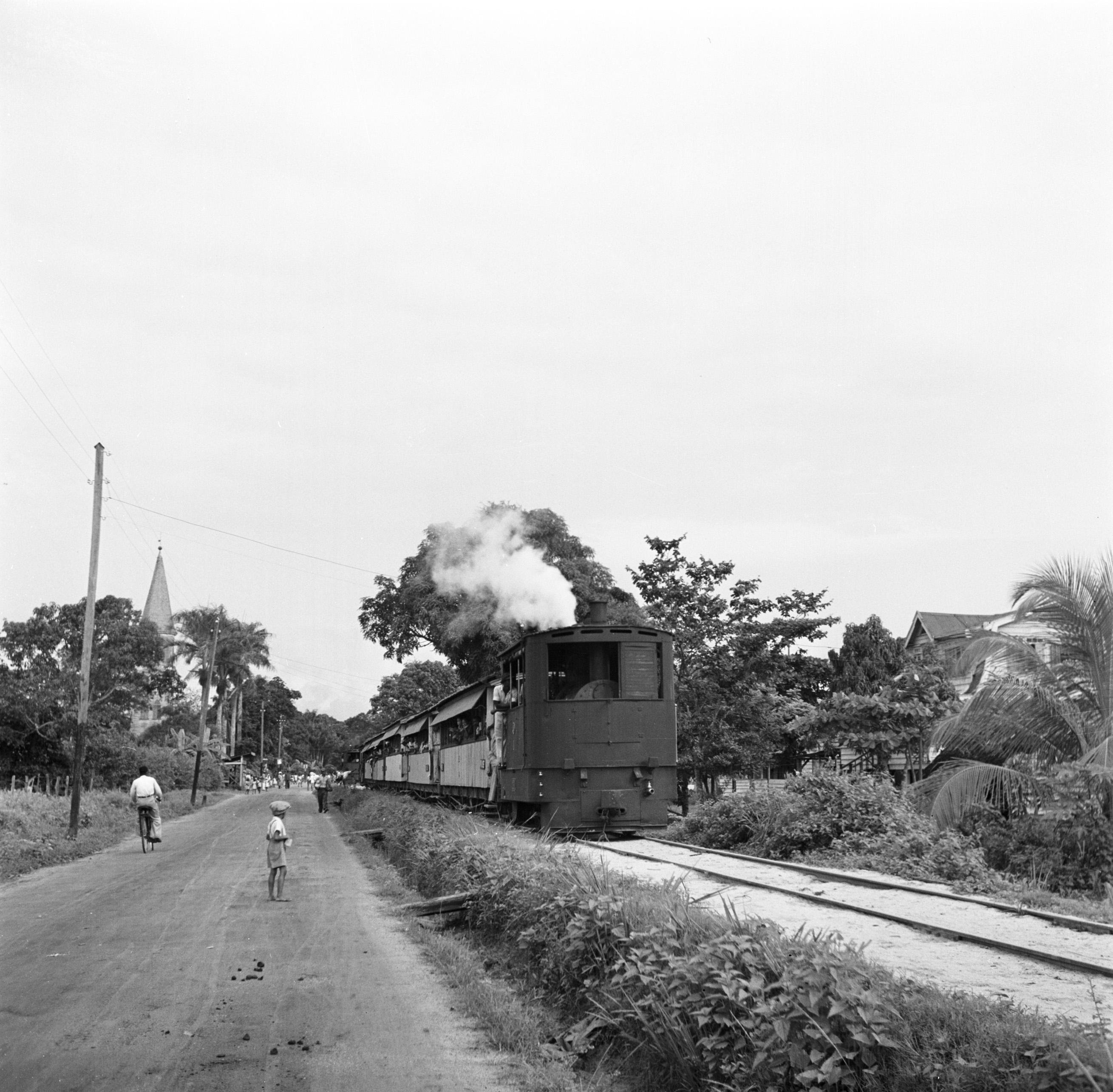
One of the Borsig steam locomotives

The German locomotive manufacturer Borsig in Berlin delivered the first set of six steam locomotives with serial numbers 5339 to 5344 and a weight of 16 t each. Their design was based on the tram engines successfully used at the Semarang Railway in Indonesia.

In 1905 the Arnold Jung Lokomotivfabrik in Kirchen, Germany, built two small steam locomotives with a weight of 8.5 t each, for use south of the Suriname River . On arrival, they had to be disassembled at the cable car station and reassembled on the other side, after crossing the river by cable car. They were named Kadjoe (Serial No PS 820) and Maabo (Serial No PS 889).

In 1908 the German locomotive manufacturer Krauß & Comp. in Munich built two 16 t sister locomotives, Gege and Dam, with serial numbers 6074 and 6075. One of them is now^{(2014)} plinthed in Onverwacht.

In 1916 the Dutch locomotive manufacturer Machinefabriek Breda (Backer & Rueb) in Breda built the steam locomotive Para (Serial No 300), which is now^{(2014)} stored with two passenger coaches at the former Onverwacht station.

=== Diesel rail cars ===
An American railcar with the number L.S.3 demonstrated the benefits of internal combustion engines instead of steam engines.

In 1954 the German joint venture Linke-Hofmann-Busch/Büssing built a three-car DMU with 160 PS for the Lawa Railway. It consisted of a motor coach with 14 seats in 1st class and 26 seats in 2nd class. The middle coach had 56 seats in 3rd class, and the last coach provided 31 seats in 3rd class and a freight capacity of 3 t.

In addition, the Lawa Railway had several inspection cars and motorised draisines.

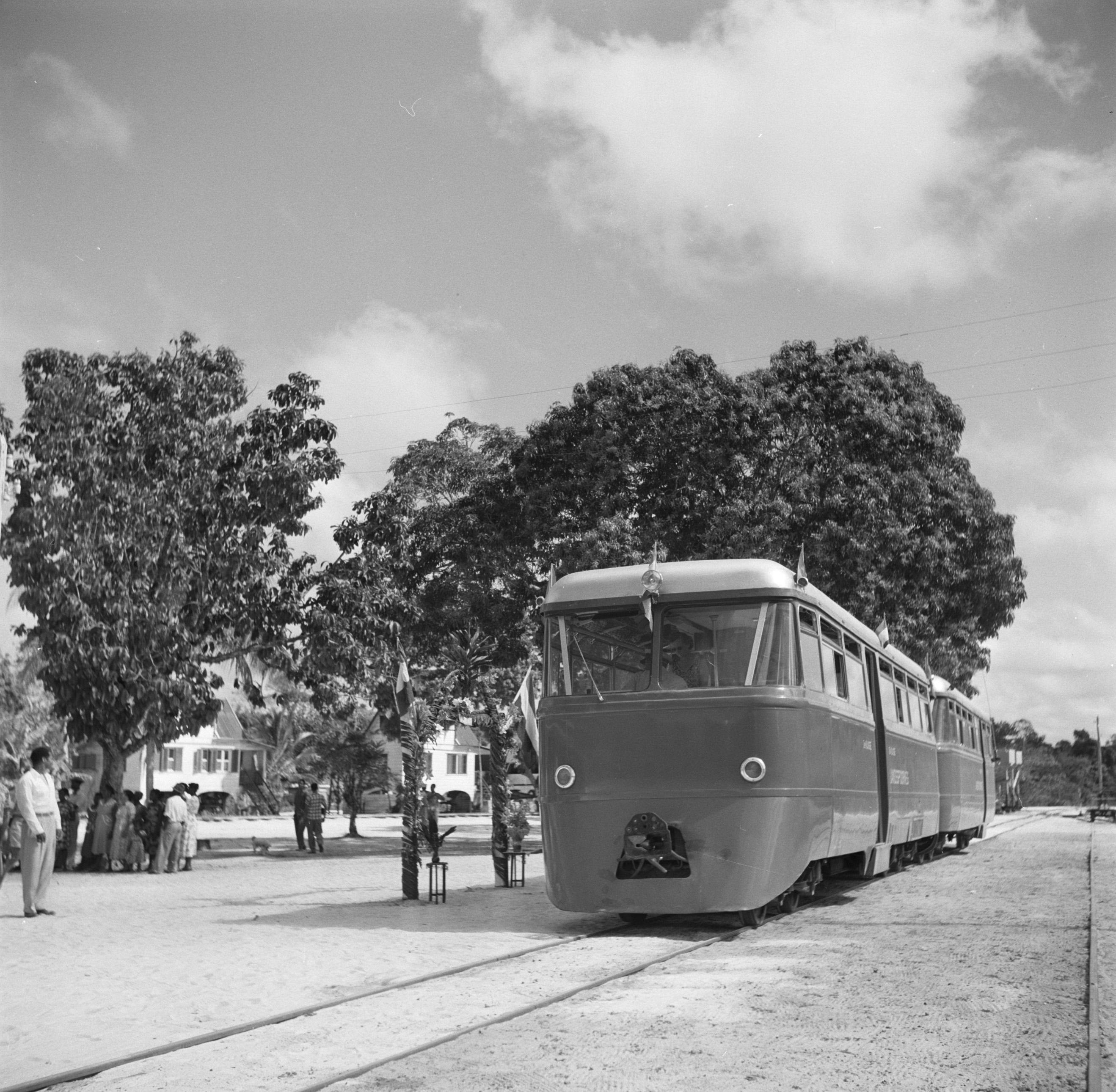
LHB/Büssing railcar

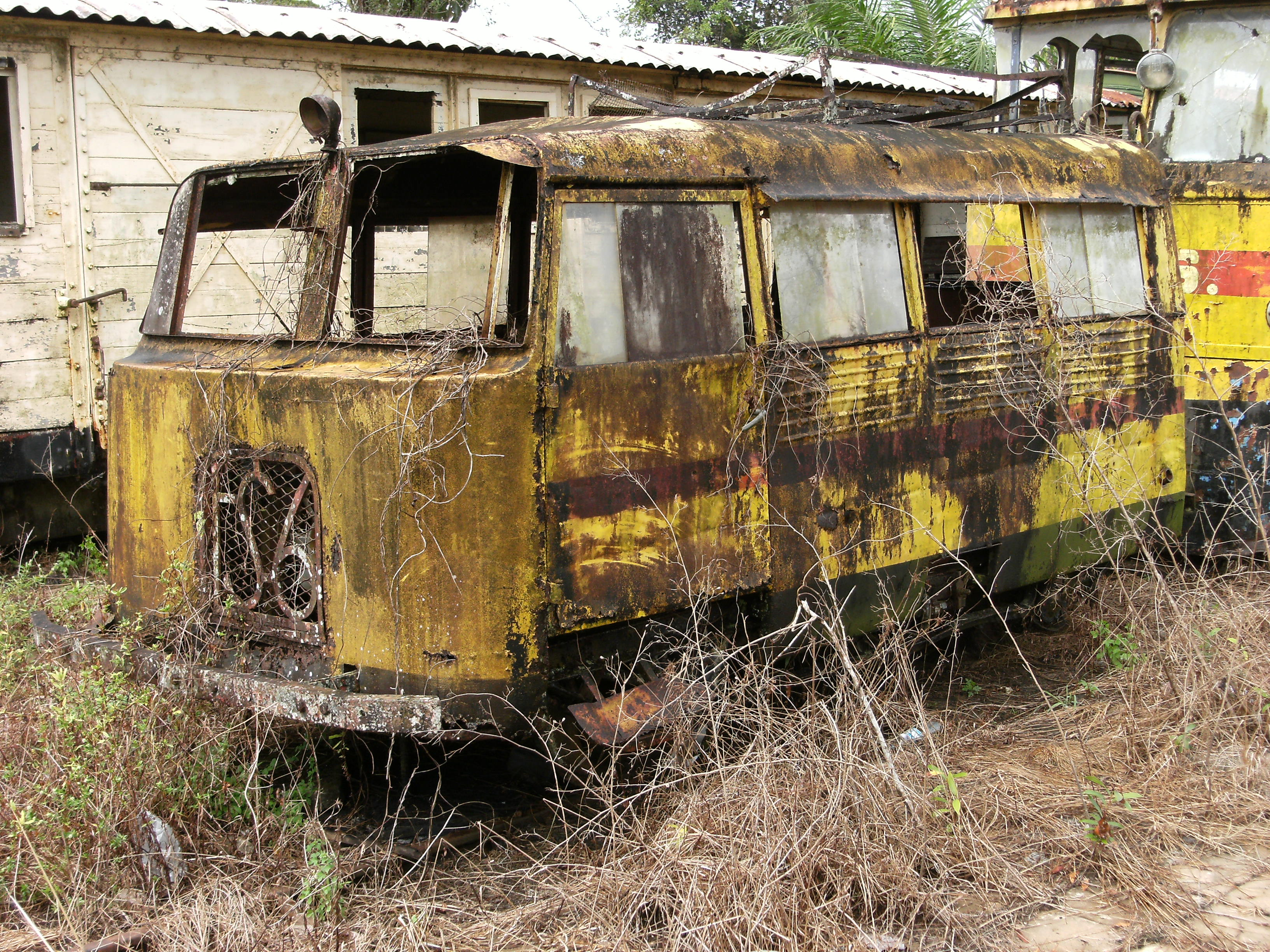
Rottenkraftwagen

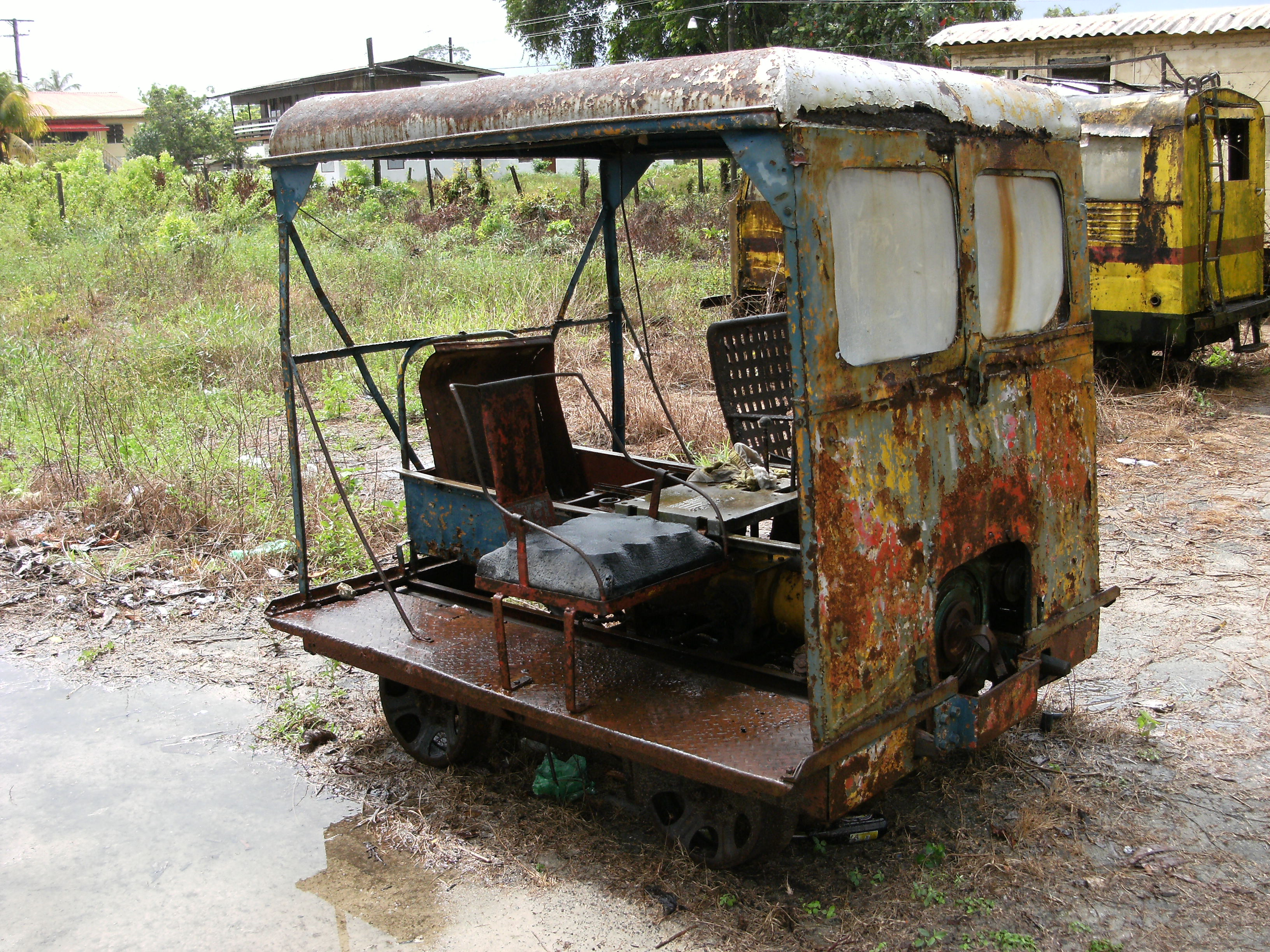
Draisine

=== Passenger and goods wagons ===
The Belgian rolling stock manufacturer Metallurgique in Marchienne-au-Pont provided 15 passenger cars with 12 windows each and fixed sun shades.

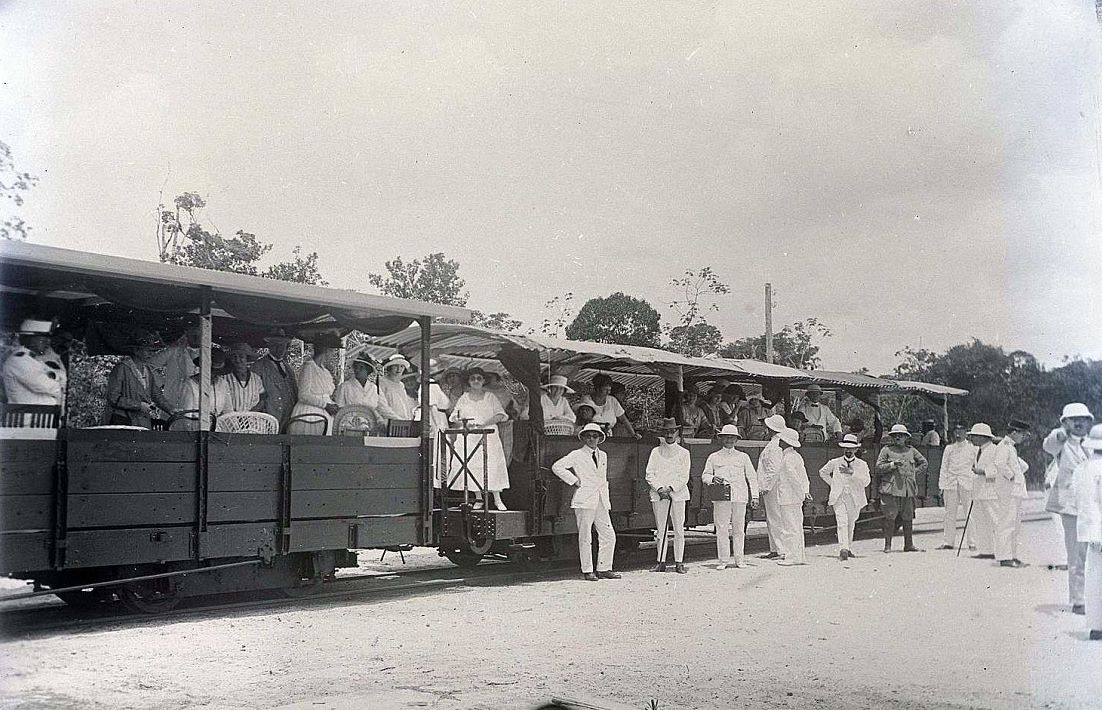
Inspection of the railway by the gouverneur in July 1923

For excursions, three tarpaulin-covered wagons were used, for example during the inspection of the railway and cable car by Governor Aarnoud van Heemstra in July 1923. A caravan style box was placed on an eight-wheeler flat car to provide a posh environment for refreshments.

Until 1959, one hundred bogie tank cars with eight wheels each were used for transporting jet fuel from the harbour in Paramaribo to the airport in Zanderij, a hazardous undertaking considering the sparks being ejected from the funnels of the steam locomotives.

== Literature and film ==
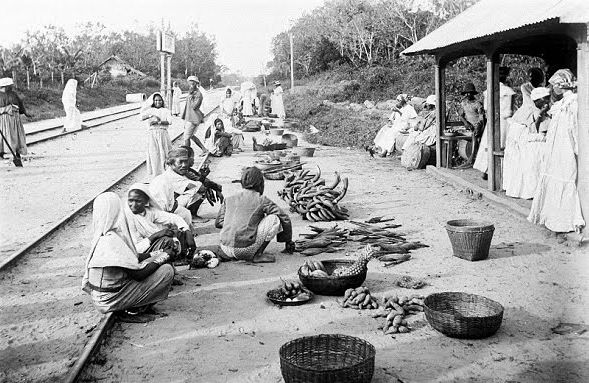
Market at Lelydorp station, 1910

In 1923 the Surinamese teacher and author Richard O'Ferrall published under the pseudonym Ultimus a satirical novel about building the railway, titled Een Beschavingswerk, een sociaal- en economisch-politieke studie in romanvorm (Civilisation work: A social, economical and political study in the form of a novel). The novel sketches an ironic vision of the gigantomania of governments, the disrespectful attitude toward maroons and indigenous people, and the truculence of the Royal Family and the idiocy of the civilisation missions.

The Dutch filmmaker Hans Hylkema filmed in 2002 a documentary The Gold Line for the broadcasting company Humanistische Omroep, in which he showed old black-and-white films of the Lawa Railway.

== Current plans ==
The government of Suriname announced in November 2014 detailed plans for a new railway from Paramaribo to Onverwacht. The Dutch company Strukton proposes to start at the Poelepantje station in Paramaribo towards the south with stations at Latour, Hannaslust, Welgedacht, Lelydorp, Bernharddorp and Onverwacht. The construction was originally estimated to last 12 months at approximately €130 million cost. In a second phase, the line could be extended to the Johan Adolf Pengel International Airport.
