= Zanderij =

- Village
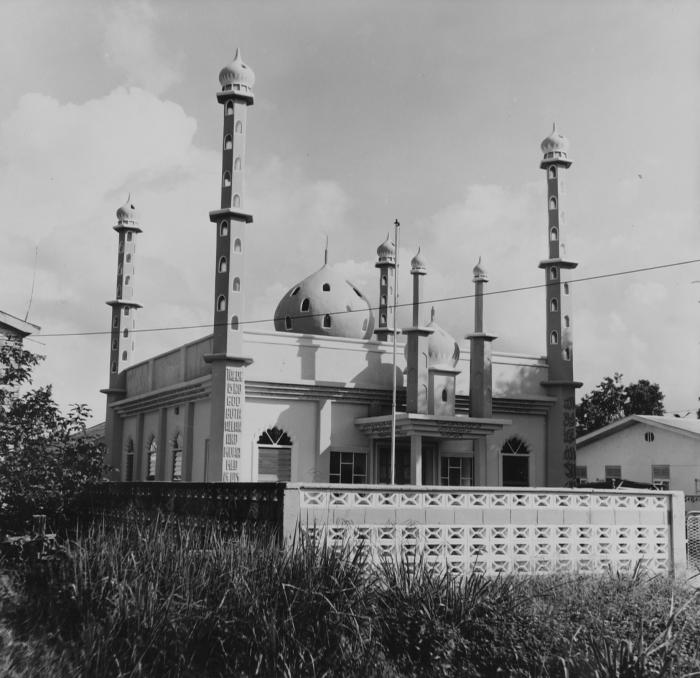
- Mosque in Zanderij (1964)

- Location in Suriname
- Coordinates: 5°27′23″N 55°12′22″W
- Country: Suriname
- District: Para
- Resort: Zuid
- Time zone: UTC-3 (ART)

Zanderij is a village in northern Suriname, situated about 55 kilometres (34 mi) by road south of the capital Paramaribo on the Southern East-West Link. It is adjacent to the village of Witsanti.

The Johan Adolf Pengel International Airport is located near the village, and there is a meteorological watch station just to the west of the airport. Zanderij was the site of the Surinam Airways Flight 764 plane crash in June 1989.

== History ==
On 7 June 1989, Surinam Airways Flight 764 crashed in Zanderij, killing 178 of the 187 passengers on board, including a group of professional Dutch football players. Only 11 people and a dog survived. The dog was named "Lucky" by the police.

== Geography and geology ==
Zanderij is situated approximately 55 kilometres (34 mi) by road south of the Surinamese capital of Paramaribo, adjacent to Witsanti. The village of Pikin Saron is roughly 22 kilometres (14 mi) to the southwest by road.

Geologically, the Zanderij Belt is part of the Coesewijne Formation, which was formerly called the Zanderij Formation. It contains material dating to the Pliocene period. The sands are coarse in texture, and are divided into bleached and unbleached soils. The bleached soils are described as "extremely infertile".

== Landmarks ==
Johan Adolf Pengel International Airport (PBM) is situated in close proximity to the village, and there is also a meteorological watch station just to the west of the airport. There is a BCM Ministry Centre in Zanderij and the national Avis Car Rental branch for the country to serve passengers coming into Suriname at the airport.

== Notable people ==
- Zachari Zeegelaar (born 1989), FIFA football assistant referee, grew up in Zanderij
