= Para Creek =

River in Suriname

Para Creek Para River
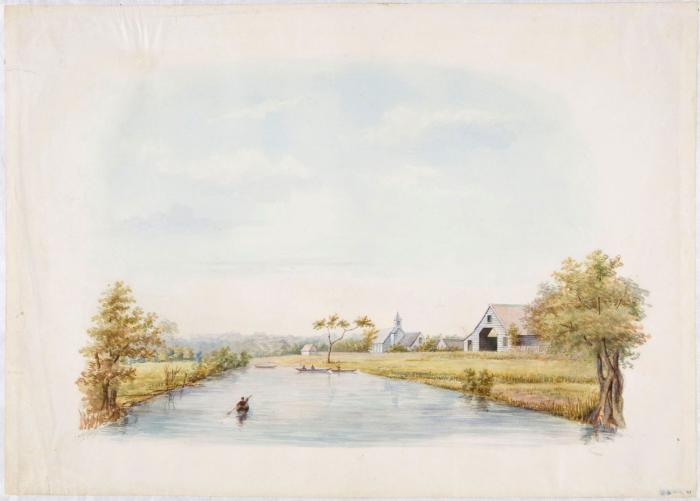
- Painting of the Para Creek near plantation Berseba (~1860)

- Location within Suriname
- Native name: Parakreek (Dutch)

Location
- Country: Suriname
- District: Wanica & Para District

Physical characteristics
- Source
  - coordinates: 5.4015°N 55.1624°W
- Mouth: Suriname River
  - coordinates: 5.74642°N 55.12789°W
- Length: 77.65 kilometres (48.25 mi)

Basin features
- Progression: Suriname River→Atlantic Ocean

Para Creek (Dutch: Parakreek also Para River) is a blackwater creek in the Wanica & Para District of Suriname. It is a tributary of the Suriname River, and was home to many plantations. The area around the creek has been cultivated since the English period. The Para District has been named after the creek in 1966.

== Overview ==
The Para Creek is fed by many small creeks from the savanna area, and has a drainage basin of 1,650 square kilometres (640 sq mi). During the colonisation of Suriname, most plantations were built along the Suriname River and the Para Creek, because the ground was fertile, and no additional infrastructure was required. In the 20th century, many holiday resorts were built on the Para Creek and its tributaries.

The northern part of Para Creek near the mouth experiences minor tidal movements, but has no salinity. The southern part of the creek used to be home to many wood plantations. The last 25 kilometres (16 mi) of the Para Creek are parallel to the Suriname River, therefore, the Paradoorsnede, an artificial canal, was dug in the 18th century to provide better access. The canal is 3.4 kilometres (2.1 mi) long.

== Fort Para ==
In 1685, Fort Para was constructed on the Para Creek near Houttuin to protect the plantations against attacks by the Amerindians, however in 1686 a peace treaty was signed between the tribes and Governor van Aerssen van Sommelsdijck. In 1740, the fort was demolished.

== See also ==
- Coropina Kreek

== Bibliography ==
- Planbureau (2014). "Waterbeheersingsplan Pararivier en Zijkreken" (PDF). Planning Office Suriname (in Dutch).
