= Witsanti =

- Village
- Location within Suriname
- Coordinates: 5.4705°N 55.190611°W
- Country: Suriname
- District: Para District
- Resort: Zuid

Government
  - Captain: Patrick Mandé

Population (2022)
  - Total: 1,600
- Time zone: UTC-3 (AST)

Witsanti (also Wit Santi) is an Indigenous village of Lokono and Kalina Amerindians in the resort of Zuid in the Para District in Suriname. The village is located on the John F. Kennedyweg near the Johan Adolf Pengel International Airport.

== Overview ==
Witsanti has a school and a clinic. The village chief is Patrick Mandé.

== Indigenous land ==
Witsanti is at the centre of an indigenous land conflict. It started in 2007, when a court awarded 643 hectares of land which included a burial ground of the village to two Dutch heirs of the Tempoca plantation.

Steven Relyveld, who was born in Witsanti, was elected Minister of Land Policy and Forest Management in 2013. The village was hopeful that the land issue would be resolved in its favour. In 2013, the airport was awarded land of the village, and in 2016, laid claim to another piece of indigenous land. A demonstration lead to the arrest of Patrick Mandé, the village chief, and one of his basjas (council members). On 8 June 2016, the main access road to the airport was blocked in protest. On 24 November 2020, the village threatened to go to Inter-American Court of Human Rights over the issue.
