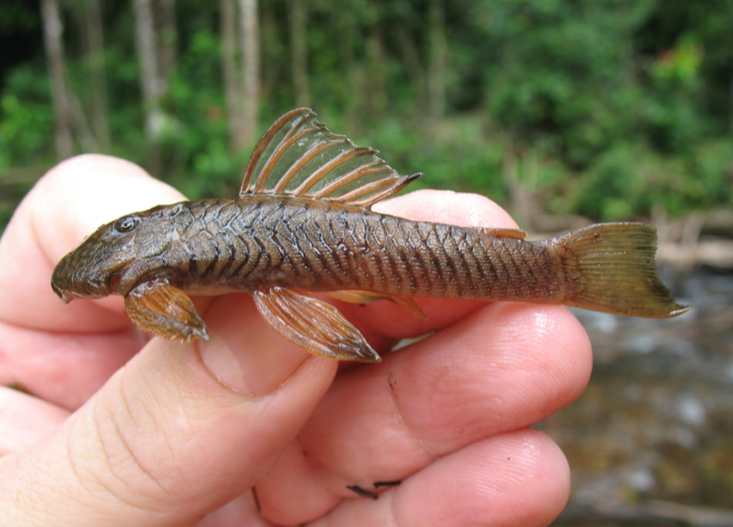
- Live-color photograph of Guyanancistrus nassauensis from the Marowijne River, taken by Jonathan W. Armbruster

Scientific classification
- Kingdom: Animalia
- Phylum: Chordata
- Class: Actinopterygii
- Order: Siluriformes
- Family: Loricariidae
- Genus: Guyanancistrus
- Species: G. nassauensis

Binomial name
- Guyanancistrus nassauensis Mol, Fisch-Muller & Covain, 2018

= Guyanancistrus nassauensis =

Species of fish

Guyanancistrus nassauensis is a species of catfish belonging to the family Loricariidae, the suckermouth armored catfishes. It is discovered in 2005 and formally described in 2018. G. nassauensis is a rare species, highly endemic to the Nassau Mountains in Suriname, and is threatened with extinction by proposed or ongoing mining activities.

== Description ==
=== Morphology ===
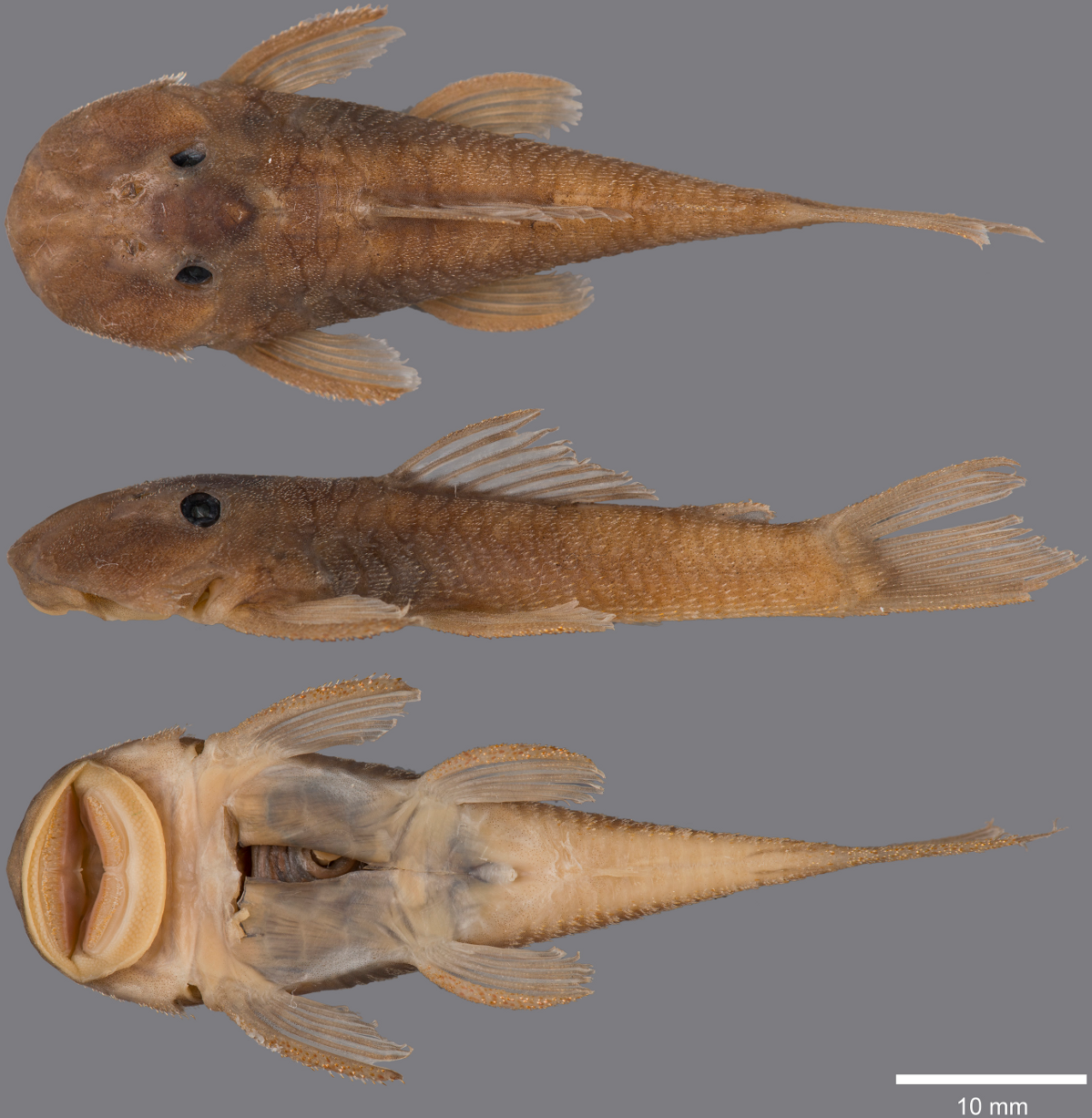
The holotype (MHNG 2679.100), likely a breeding male, has a standard length of 42.0 mm; Suriname: Sipaliwini: Paramaka Creek, Nassau Mountains

Guyanancistrus nassauensis is a small-sized species, the largest specimen observed having a standard length (SL) of 61.0 mm. Head and body dorsoventrally depressed and wide. Dorsal profile gently convex from snout tip to dorsal-fin origin, usually more flattened posterior to orbit, slightly convex and sloped ventrally from dorsal-fin origin to adipose fin, then slightly concave to procurrent caudal-fin rays, and rising to caudal fin. Ventral profile flat from snout to base of caudal fin.

A low median ridge from tip of snout to nostrils, sometimes bordered by lateral depression, a slight elevation anterior to orbits, supraoccipital slightly convex to flat. Dorsal margin gently flattened from base of first branched dorsal-fin ray to base of adipose fin between very slight ridges formed with lateral plates of dorsal series. First lateral plates of mid-ventral series forming low lateral ridge. Caudal peduncle roughly ovoid in cross section, flattened ventrally, and more compressed posteriorly.

Large, rounded and laterally flattened snout. Eye relatively small. Large oval mouth, lower lip wide, not or just reaching pectoral girdle, upper lip narrower. Lips forming an oval disk, covered with short papillae. Presence of a single narrow buccal papilla. Very short maxillary barbel. Teeth short and strong with a relatively long bicuspid crown, lateral lobe about half size of medial lobe.

Head and body plated dorsally, plates generally covered by short and uniformly distributed odontodes. Tip of snout largely naked. Lateral margin of snout covered with plates forming a rigid armor with short odontodes. Opercle supporting odontodes. A narrow unplated area bordering posterodorsal margin of opercle. Evertible cheek plates with enlarged odontodes in highly variable number, from fewer than ten up to approximately 35 in some large specimens. These cheek odontodes straight with tips curved, the longest usually reaching middle of the opercle, or beyond in large specimens. Two to four rows of plates between supraoccipital plate and dorsal-fin spinelet, nuchal plate often covered by skin. Five series of lateral plates extending to caudal fin. Odontodes on lateral series of plates not forming keels. Odontodes on posterior part of pectoral-fin spine enlarged, only slightly in small specimens, much more significantly in large specimens (presumably males). Abdominal region totally naked. No platelike structure before the anal fin. Ventral part of caudal peduncle covered with plates showing a highly reduced number of odontodes.

Dorsal-fin origin slightly anterior to pelvic-fin origin. Dorsal fin short; when adpressed, far from reaching preadipose unpaired plate. Adipose fin roughly triangular, preceded by one, or two fused into one, median unpaired raised plate. Adipose spine straight or slightly convex dorsally, membrane posteriorly convex. Pectoral-spine short, tip usually reaching the first quarter of pelvic spine, exceptionally extending up to the first third in large specimens (presumably males). Anal fin short with weak spine, its margin convex. Caudal fin slightly concave, ventral lobe longer than dorsal lobe. Fin-ray formulae: dorsal II,7; pectoral I,6; pelvic i,5; anal i,4 (except 1 specimen, 49.6 mm SL, with i,5); caudal i,14, I.

=== Coloration ===
In alcohol, dorsal part of body uniformly grey-brown, ventral part yellowish except usually patches of melanophores on lateral parts and in the anal region, and abdomen whitish. Fin-rays brownish, with medium-sized spots by some specimens, these spots forming or not forming bands; margin of caudal fin often orange- or red-brown; fin-membranes usually not pigmented, or pigment restricted to areas bordering rays. In life (based on a photograph of one specimen), dorsal coloration of body brown with some lighter ill-defined orange-brown spots; fins orange-brown, fin-membranes hardly pigmented.

=== Differential disgnosis ===
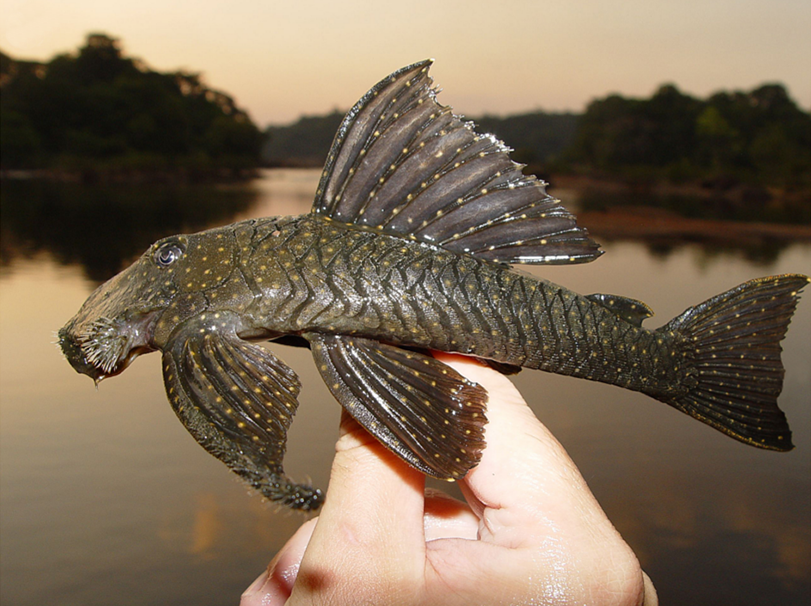
Guyanancistus niger possesses a long pectoral-fin spine and white spots that differentiate it from G. nassauensis.

Guyanancistrus nassauensis is morphologically discriminated from all congeners by a small adult size (largest specimen observed 61 mm SL; adult size likely reached around 40 mm SL), by a reduced number of anal-fin rays (4 branched rays vs 5, apart from exceptional specimens), and by a wide oval mouth with both large dentary and premaxillary tooth cups (in % of head length, respectively: 24.2–31.9, mean 27.6, vs 23.6 or less except in Guyanancistrus niger, and 25.4–31.4, mean 28.1, vs 24.5 or less). Only G. niger has dentaries nearly as large (22.5–26.3, mean 25.0% of HL) but its premaxillaries are shorter (21.7–23.6, mean 22.6% of HL).

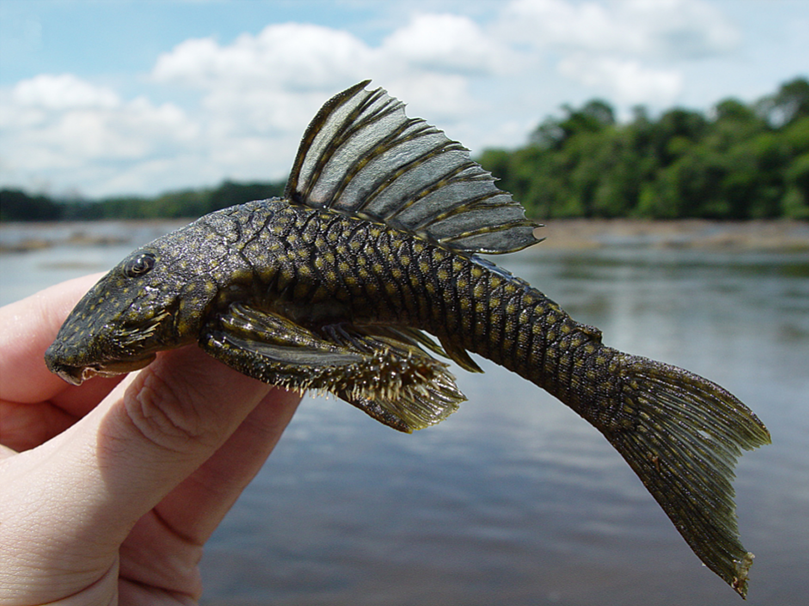
Guyanancistus longispinis possesses a long pectoral-fin spine and roundish yellow spots that differentiate it from G. nassauensis.

G. nassauensis is distinguished from G. longispinis and from G. niger by a much shorter pectoral-fin spine (in % of SL: 22.2–26.3, mean 24.4, vs 31.9–45.5, mean 40.2, and 33.3–48.0, mean 42.8, respectively), and by color pattern (body and fins uniformly brown or with indistinct medium-sized paler spots, vs brown-black with either small roundish yellow spots for G. longispinis, or white dots for G. niger). It is further separated from all G. brevispinis group species by having, on average, the widest body, the deepest and longest head, the largest interbranchial distance, the shortest fins, and the highest number of teeth.

G. nassauensis is distinguished from all congeners except G. brevispinis by its specific barcode sequences of the COI gene.

== Ecology ==
Apart from its habitat, few informations are available on the ecology of Guyanancistrus nassauensis. Few traits of its behavior were described from observations in aquarium of four specimens which were kept with Harttiella crassicauda in April 2006. G. nassauensis was active both during the day and at night, and did not retreat in shelter, even for an individual that was transferred to a larger tank with numerous other fishes. It was not territorial but tolerated the presence of other fishes, either conspecific or not. G. nassauensis mostly spent its time on the aquarium panes and on macrophytes, woody debris and rock, but not on the sandy substrate on the bottom. In aquarium, it accepted vegetarian flakes after a short period of acclimatation, and was also observed feeding on algae.

== Distribution and habitat ==
Guyanancistrus nassauensis is known solely from Paramaka Creek and some of its tributaries, Marowijne River Basin, in the Surinamese Nassau Mountains (an area of approximately 20x20 km^{2}). In Paramaka Creek, G. nassauensis occurs syntopically with juvenile G. brevispinis and with Harttiella crassicauda, a second endemic species from the Nassau Mountains. However, G. nassauensis occurs both on the plateau in perennial flowing headwaters and in the upper mainstem of Paramaka Creek (lower slopes of the plateau; altitude range 120–530 m amsl), whereas H. crassicauda only occurs on the plateau proper (230–530 m amsl). In the IJs Creek tributary of Paramaka Creek on the Nassau plateau (467 m amsl) both G. nassauensis and H. crassicauda occur in cool, shallow, clear water with low conductivity, neutral pH, low inorganic N, relatively high organic N, low total P and high organic C. The bottom substrate is gravel with boulders and bedrock (with the red filamentous algae Batrachospermum sp. attached to it) and near the edge of the plateau in slightly deeper water (approximately 50 cm) stands of the emergent macrophyte Thurnia sphaerocephala occur. Its dwarfism could be an adaptation to small streams, with cool water temperature, a low productivity. In the upper mainstem of Paramaka Creek, as well as in some upstream branches on the plateau, G. nassauensis occurs syntopically with G. brevispinis. At an elevation of 277 m, the type locality is located in a northern branch of Paramaka Creek, a medium-sized and shallow stream (3–7 m. width; less than 50 cm depth) with pools and some riffle habitat, a rocky substrate, and bordered by terra firme rainforest.

== Taxonomy ==
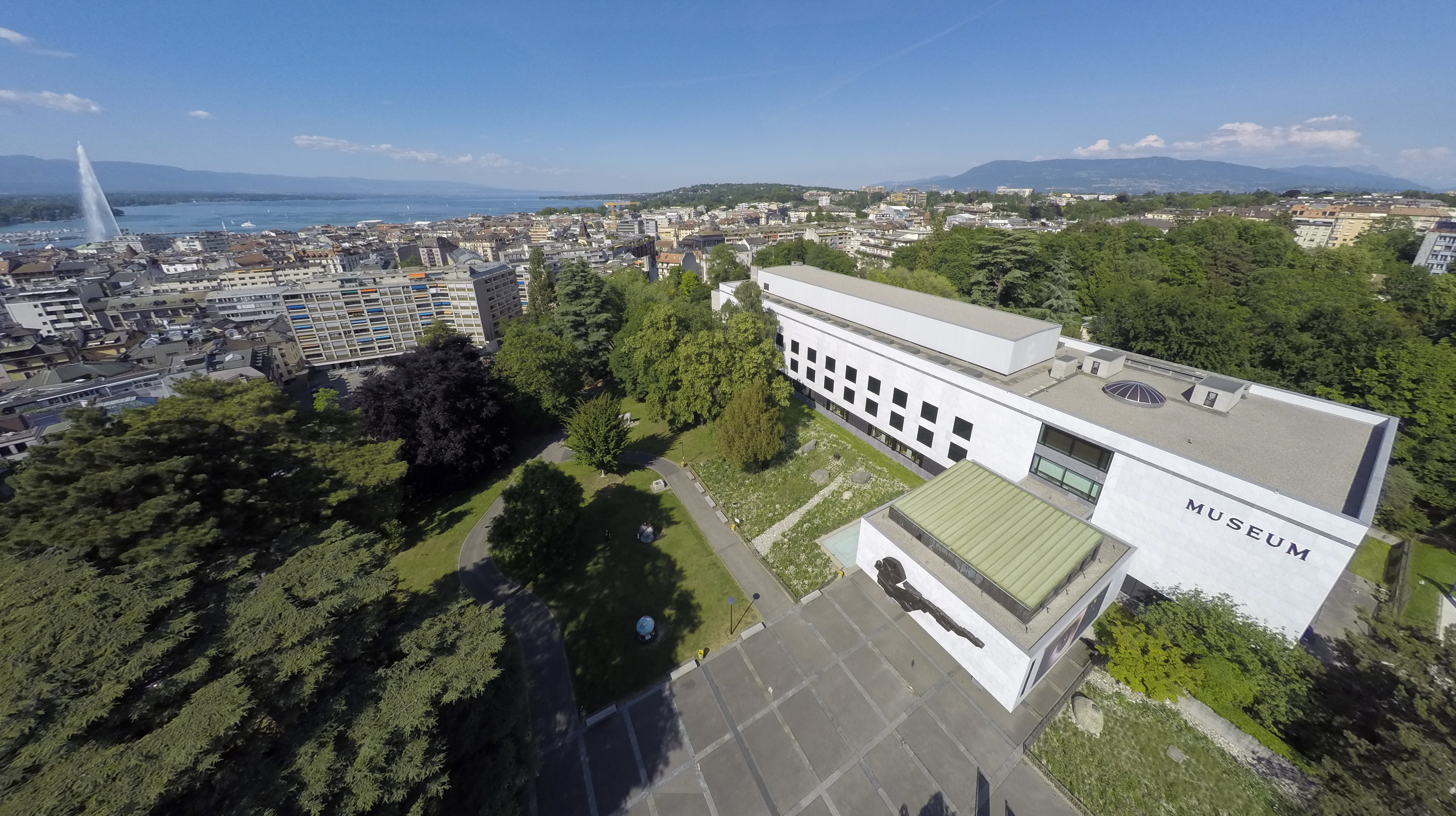
Aerial view of the Natural History Museum of Geneva, where the holotype and three paratypes are deposited.

The species is discovered in 2005 by a team of 13 scientists who explored a region about 80 miles southeast of Paramaribo. It was first referred to as "Guyanancistrus 'big mouth'", because of its unusually large mouth before being formally described in 2018. The name nassauensis is a reference to the distribution of the species which is only known in streams in the Nassau Mountains. The holotype, collected in 2006, is preserved in the collections of the Natural History Museum of Geneva (MHNG), and paratypes are deposited in the Genevan institution, the Auburn University Museum of Natural History (AUM) and the National Zoological Collection of Suriname (NZCS).

== Threats and conservation ==
Guyanancistrus nassauensis and G. brownsbergensis are each known from a single mountain stream, in the Nassau Mountains (Paramaka Creek) and Brownsberg Mountains (Kumbu Creek), respectively. With this very restricted distribution (< 20x20 km^{2}) both species can be considered hyperendemics and currently the two species are threatened with extinction by a proposed bauxite mine and by ongoing illegal gold mining activities.

== Bibliography ==
- Fisch-Muller, Sonia; Mol, Jan H. A.; Covain, Raphaël (2018). "An integrative framework to reevaluate the Neotropical catfish genus Guyanancistrus (Siluriformes: Loricariidae) with particular emphasis on the Guyanancistrus brevispinis complex". PLOS ONE. 13 (1) e0189789. Bibcode:2018PLoSO..1389789F. doi:10.1371/journal.pone.0189789. ISSN 1932-6203. PMC 5752014. PMID 29298344.
