= Brownsweg =

- Town and Resort
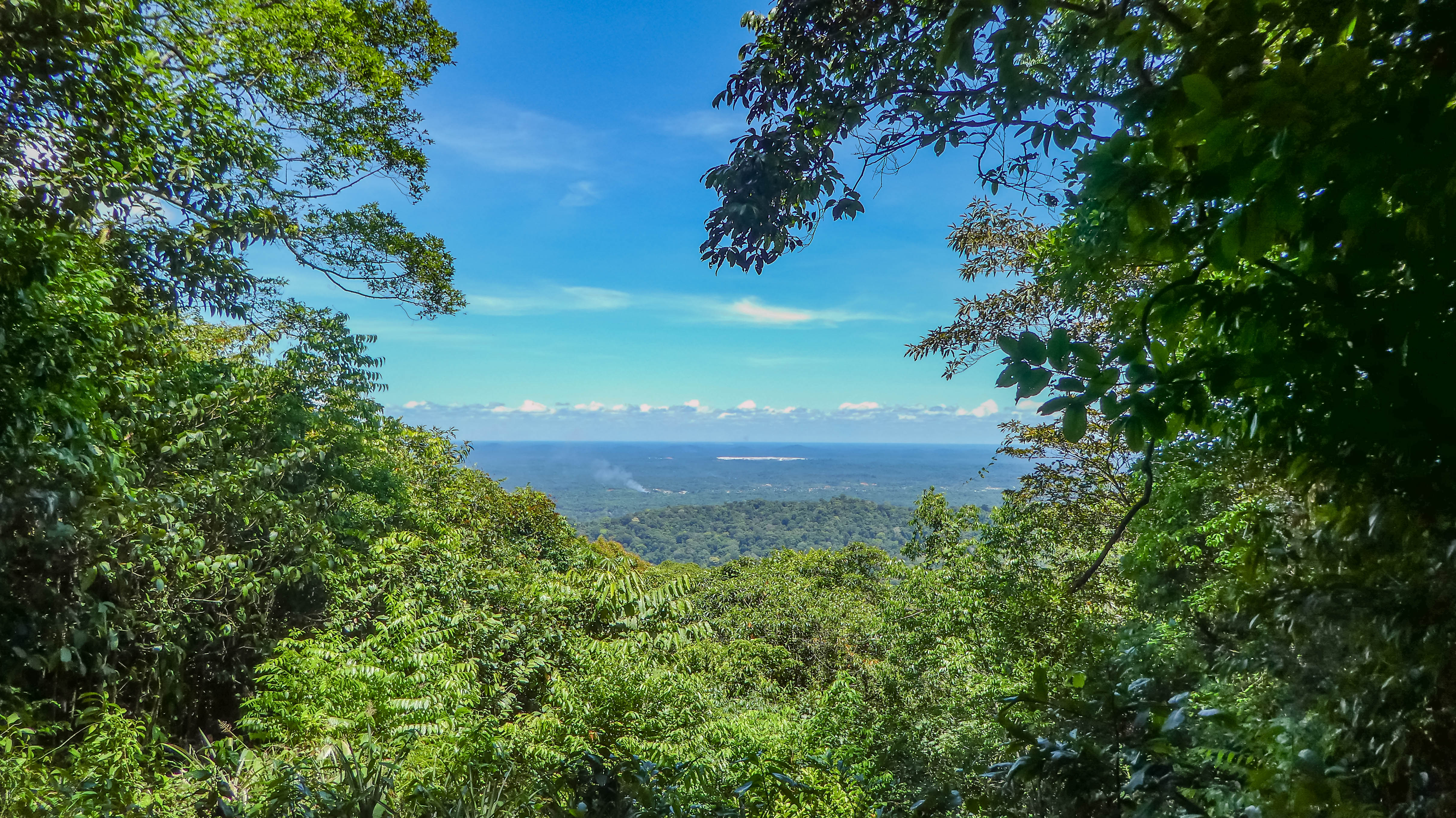
- View from the Brownsberg

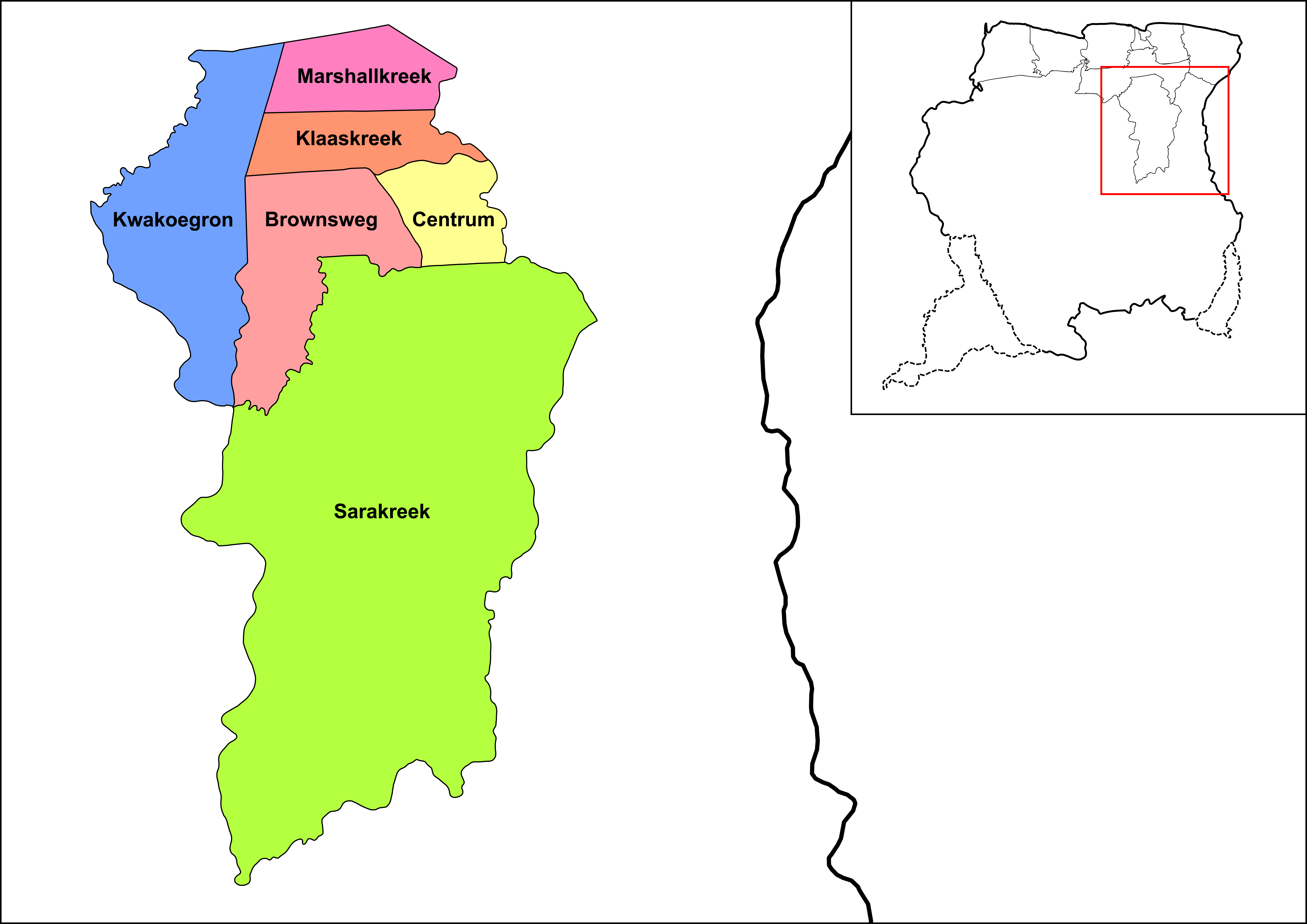
- Map showing the resorts of Brokopondo District. Brownsweg
- Coordinates: 5°00′59″N 55°10′1″W
- Country: Suriname
- District: Brokopondo
- Resort (municipality): Brownsweg

Area
  - Total: 282 sq mi (731 km^{2})

Population (1 January 2012)
  - Total: 4,793
  - Density: 17.0/sq mi (6.56/km^{2})
- Time zone: UTC-3 (AST)

Brownsweg is a town and resort in Suriname in the Brokopondo District. Its population at the 2012 census was 4,793.

== History ==
The town was named after the road that leads to the Brownsberg, and the Brownsberg Nature Park. It is situated near the Brokopondo Reservoir. In 1958 Brownsweg was built for the inhabitants of the area that was flooded after the construction of the Afobaka Dam. One of the main concerns was the transmigration of the 5,000 people living in the area. Bronsweg was a stop at the former Lawa Railway, and in 1959 the Prinses Marijke camp was built near the hamlet.

The resort consists of the villages Wakibasoe 1, 2, 3, Bierhoedoematoe, Kadjoe, Nieuw Ganze, Djankakondre, Makambi, and Nieuw-Koffiekamp. Brownsweg is often used to refer to most villages, because they have grown together, except for Bierhoedoematoe and Nieuw-Koffiekamp which are still detached.

The largest ethnic group of Brownsweg are the Maroons. Most of the inhabitants still live tribally in villages near the rivers and roads. The primary medical care is performed by Medische Zending. The resort can be reached via the Avobakaweg. On 15 May 2020, the Afobakaweg will connect to the Dési Delano Bouterse Highway, the only motorway in Suriname between Paramaribo and Zanderij.

Brownsberg can be reached from the town of Brownsweg. Stoneiland, a tourist resort and beach, is located at the foot of the mountain.

== Sports ==
ACoconut is an association football club in Brownsweg. Bigi Wey Sports Center is a sports venue in Brownsweg.

== Notable people ==
- Diana Pokie (~1979), politician.
