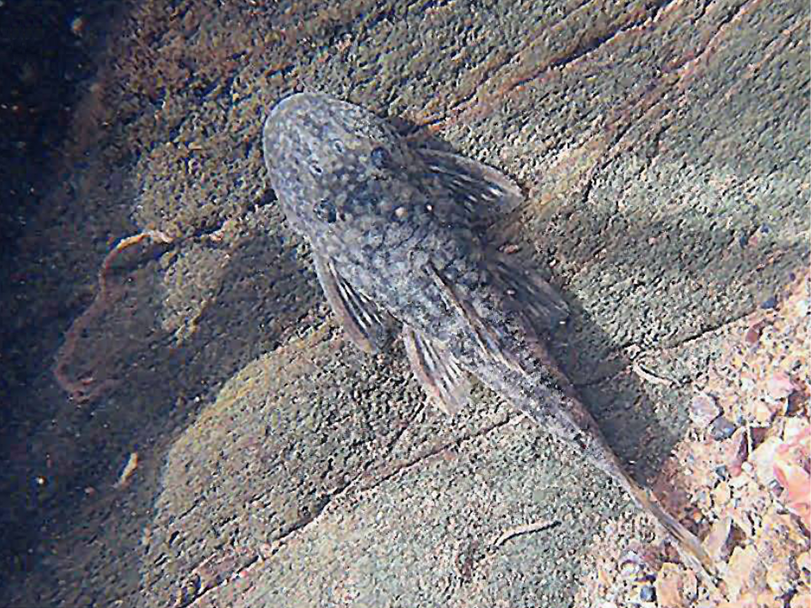

Scientific classification
- Kingdom: Animalia
- Phylum: Chordata
- Class: Actinopterygii
- Order: Siluriformes
- Family: Loricariidae
- Genus: Guyanancistrus
- Species: G. brownsbergensis

Binomial name
- Guyanancistrus brownsbergensis Mol, Fisch-Muller & Covain, 2018

= Guyanancistrus brownsbergensis =

Species of catfish

Guyanancistrus brownsbergensis is a species of catfish in the family Loricariidae. It is native to South America, where it occurs in the upper Kumbu Creek, which is part of the Saramacca River basin, in Brownsberg Nature Park in the Brownsberg Mountains in Suriname. The type locality of the species is a small mountain stream with a width of 2.5 to 3.7 m (8.2 to 12.1 ft), a depth of 28 to 50 cm (11 to 19.7 inches), a temperature of 23.1 to 23.2 °C (73.6 to 73.8 °F), an oxygen concentration of 7.08 to 7.72 g/mL, an oxygen saturation of 93% to 96%, a pH of 7 to 7.5, a conductivity of 30.8 to 31.6 μS/cm, and a current strength of 0.29 to 0.56 m/s. The stream has clear water and a substrate composed of sand, gravel, pebbles, bedrock, and boulders, and overhanging vegetation, leaf litter, and woody debris are present. The species reaches 6.4 cm (2.5 inches) in standard length. It is known that the habitat of the species is threatened by illegal gold mining.
