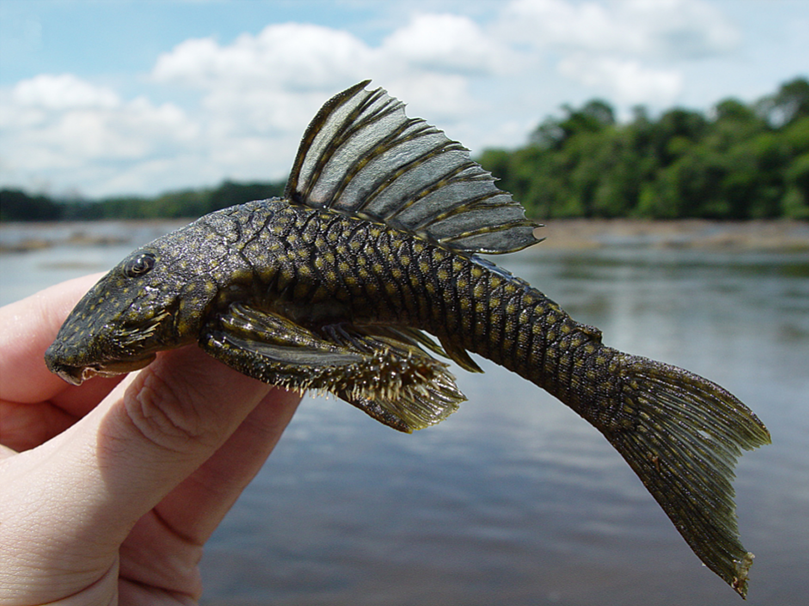

Scientific classification
- Kingdom: Animalia
- Phylum: Chordata
- Class: Actinopterygii
- Order: Siluriformes
- Family: Loricariidae
- Genus: Guyanancistrus
- Species: G. longispinis

Binomial name
- Guyanancistrus longispinis (Heitmans, Nijssen & Isbrücker, 1983)

Synonyms
- Lasiancistrus longispinis; Pseudancistrus longispinis

= Guyanancistrus longispinis =

Species of catfish

Guyanancistrus longispinis is a species of catfish in the family Loricariidae that is of disputed classification. It is native to South America, where it occurs in the Oyapock basin in French Guiana. It is typically seen in shallow rapids with rocky substrates and moderate levels of illumination. It is known to occur alongside the species Guyanancistrus brevispinis, Harttia fowleri, and Crenicichla ternetzi, as well as members of the genus Ancistrus. The species reaches 10.4 cm (4.1 inches) in standard length and may be a facultative air-breather.

Guyanancistrus longispinis was initially described as a species of Lasiancistrus in 1983. It was subsequently transferred to Guyanancistrus, then to Pseudancistrus, where it is still listed by sources such as FishBase. Despite this reclassification, a 2018 taxonomic review of Guyanancistrus recognized G. longispinis as a valid member of the genus.
