= Lugubria acutirostris =

Conservation status
- Least Concern (IUCN 3.1)

Scientific classification
- Kingdom: Animalia
- Phylum: Chordata
- Class: Actinopterygii
- Order: Cichliformes
- Family: Cichlidae
- Genus: Lugubria
- Species: L. acutirostris

Binomial name
- Lugubria acutirostris (Günther, 1862)

Synonyms
- Crenicichla acutirostris Günther, 1862

Species of fish

Lugubria acutirostris is a species of cichlid from the Amazon River basin, in the Tapajós and Aripuanã River basins. This species reaches a length of 23 cm (9.1 in).
