= Stoneiland =

Stoneiland Ston Island
- Peninsula and holiday resort
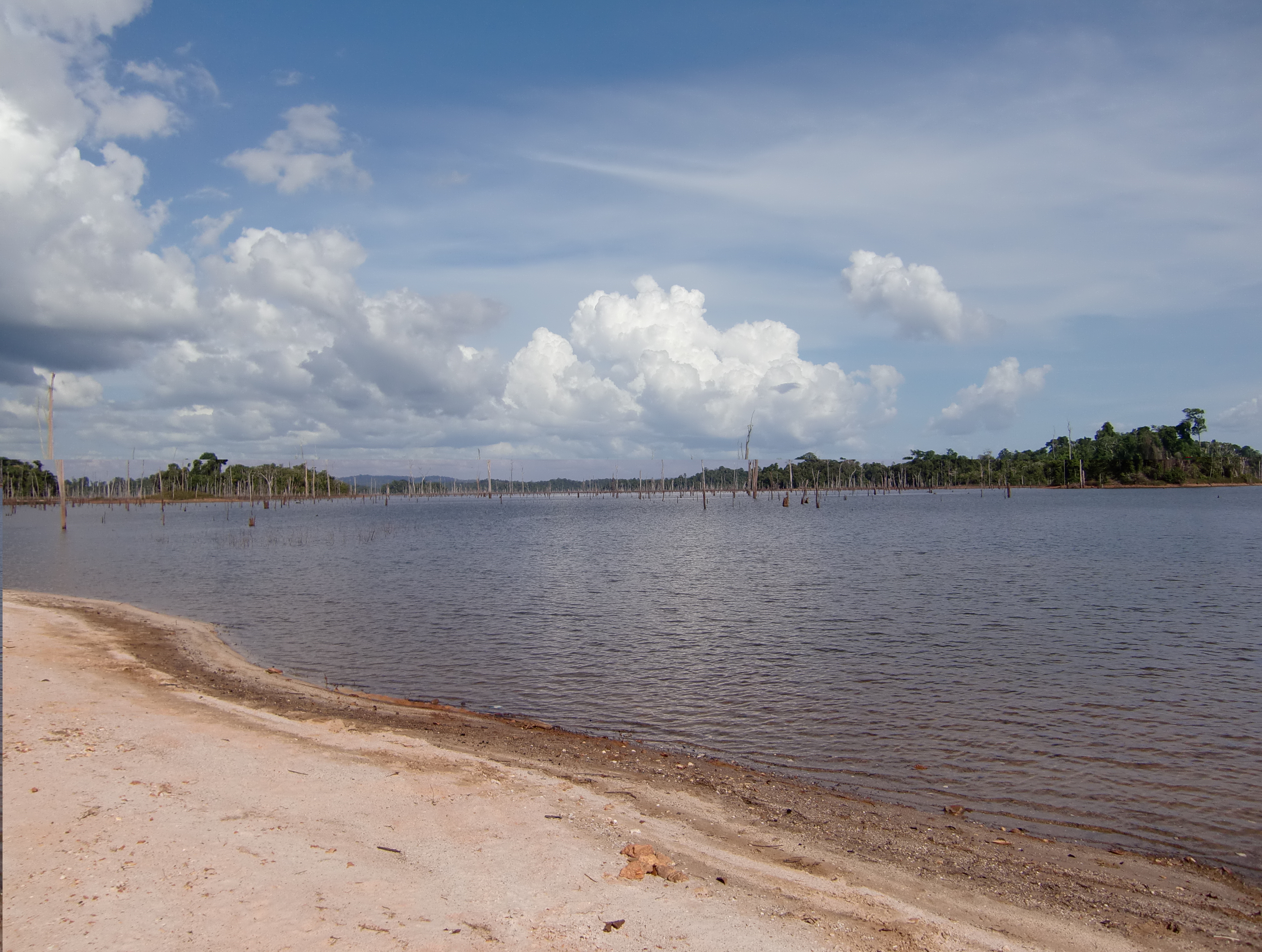
- Brokopondo Reservoir as seen from Stoneiland

- Location in Suriname
- Coordinates: 4.982222°N 55.148611°W
- Country: Suriname
- District: Brokopondo
- Resort (municipality): Brownsweg
- Time zone: UTC-3 (AST)

Stoneiland (also Ston Island) is a peninsula, holiday resort and beach in the Brokopondo District in Suriname.

== History ==
On 1 February 1964, the Afobaka Dam was built to provide hydro-electricity. This resulted in the creation of the Brokopondo Reservoir. Stoneiland was not flooded, but became a peninsula with a beach. In 2006, a former gold miner built a holiday resort near the beach.

The island is located at the foot of the Brownsberg, and can be accessed from Brownsweg. The view from the beach is unexpected, because the remains of the rain forest can still be seen on the lake. On the island there is a little wharf for tours on the lake.
