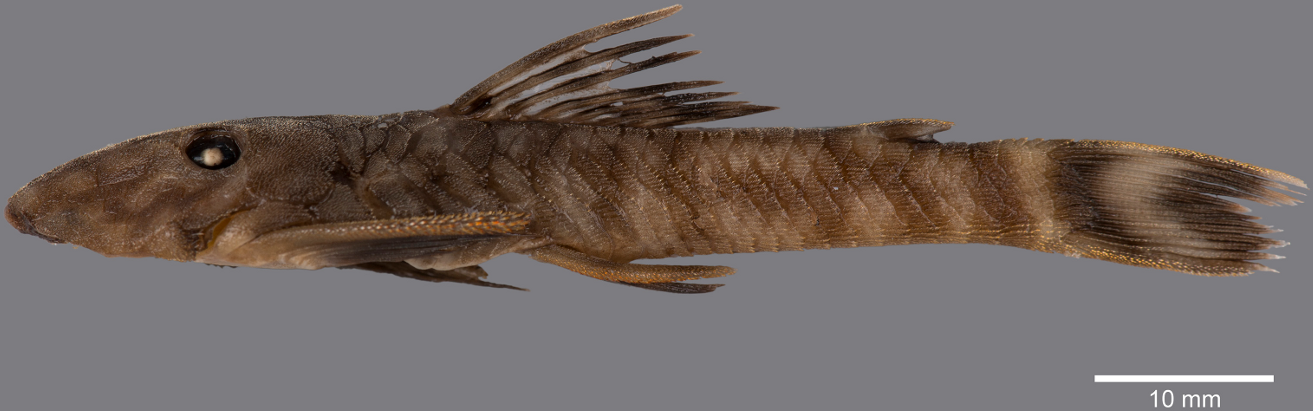

Scientific classification
- Kingdom: Animalia
- Phylum: Chordata
- Class: Actinopterygii
- Order: Siluriformes
- Family: Loricariidae
- Genus: Guyanancistrus
- Species: G. tenuis

Binomial name
- Guyanancistrus tenuis Fisch-Muller, Mol & Covain, 2018

= Guyanancistrus tenuis =

Species of catfish

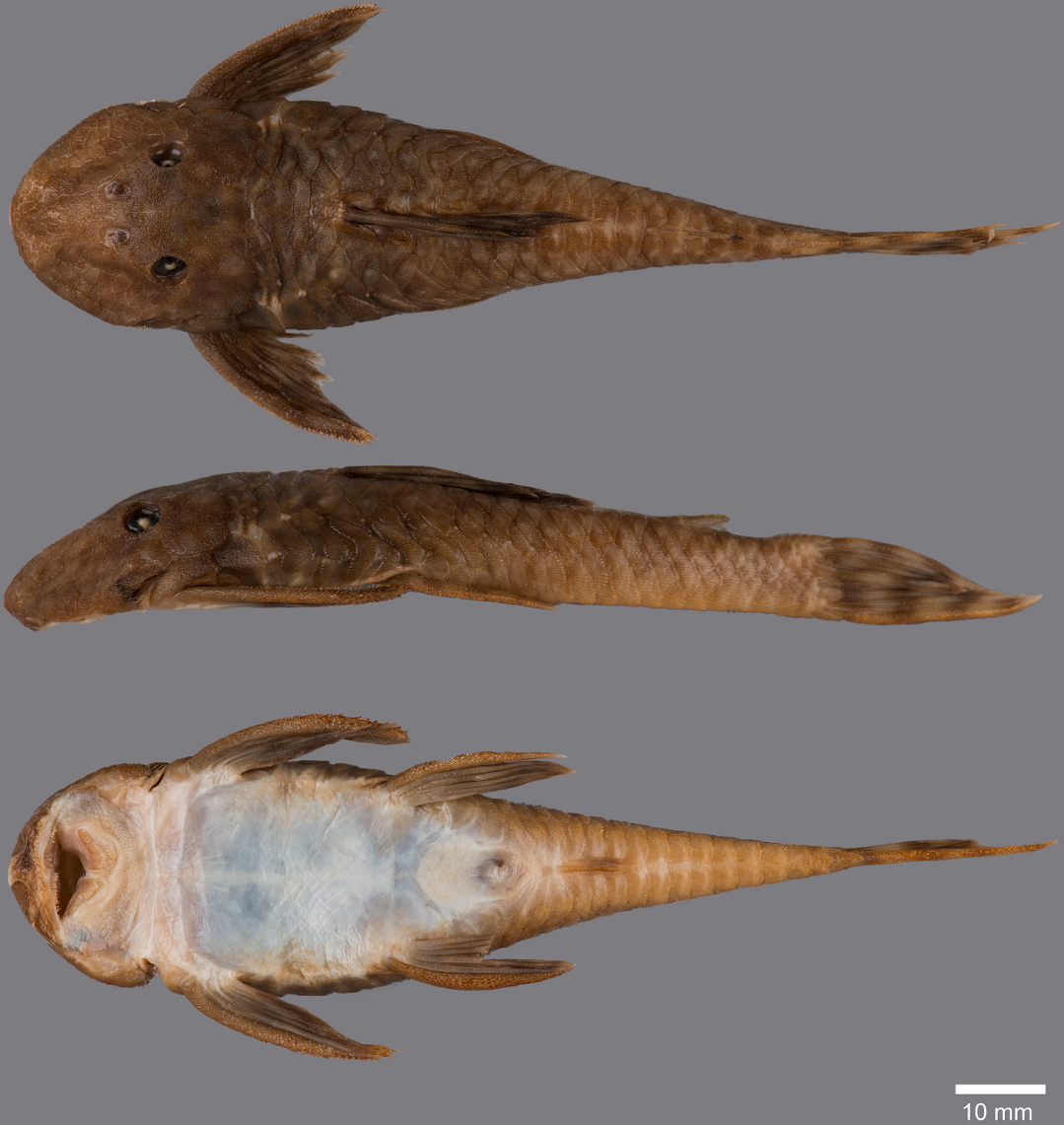
Dorsal, ventral, and lateral views of a specimen of Guyanancistrus tenuis.

Guyanancistrus tenuis is a species of catfish in the family Loricariidae. It is native to South America, where it occurs in a forested tributary of the Mapaoni River in the upper Jari River basin in French Guiana, near the Mitaraka Massif, which is a prominent massif in the area. The environment in which the species is typically found is a shallow mountain creek with medium to strong currents, a depth of 20 to 60 cm (7.9 to 23.6 inches), and some pools. The species reaches 9.1 cm (3.6 inches) in standard length. Its specific epithet, tenuis, is derived from Latin and refers to its slender body.
