= Lugubria monicae =

Scientific classification
- Kingdom: Animalia
- Phylum: Chordata
- Class: Actinopterygii
- Order: Cichliformes
- Family: Cichlidae
- Genus: Lugubria
- Species: L. monicae

Binomial name
- Lugubria monicae S. O. Kullander & H. R. Varella, 2015

Synonyms
- Crenicichla monicae

Species of fish

Lugubria monicae is a species of cichlid native to South America. It is found in the lower Rio Uaupés and lower Rio Içana, tributaries of the upper Rio Negro in Brazil. This species reaches a length of 27.3 cm (10.7 in).

The fish is named in honor of ichthyologist Mônica Toledo-Piza Ragazzo, whose efforts in publishing, in 2002, Alfred Russel Wallace’s drawings from his 1850-1852 expedition to the Rio Negro and Rio Uaupés region, were a great service to science, and also decisive for identifying this fish as a new species.
