= Nassau Mountains =

Mountain range in Suriname

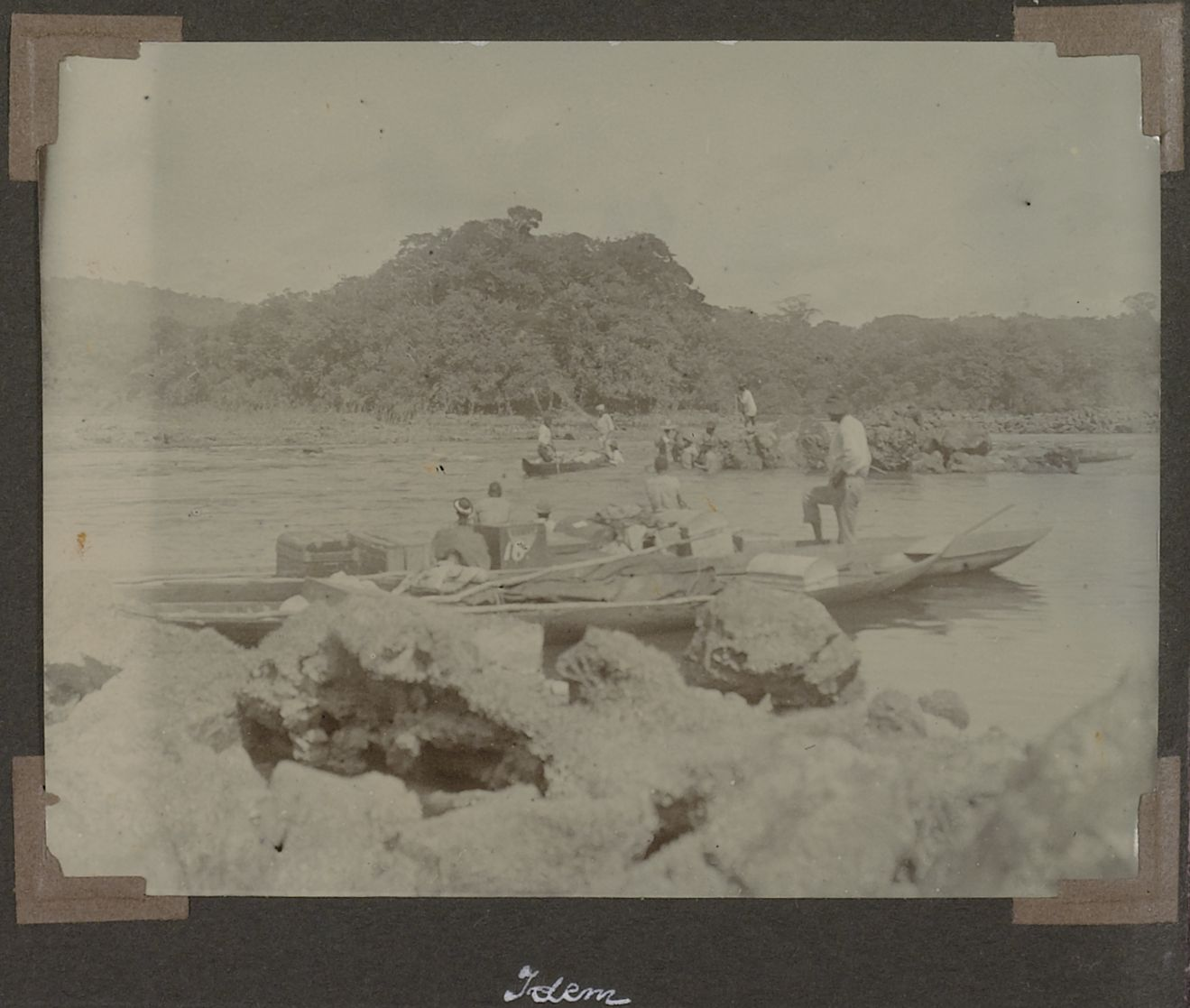

Highest point
- Elevation: 320 m (1,050 ft)
- Coordinates: 4°48′N 54°36′W

Geography
- Location within Suriname
- Country: Suriname

The Nassau Mountains (Dutch: Nassaugebergte) is a mountain range in the Sipaliwini District of Suriname. It is named after the House of Nassau.

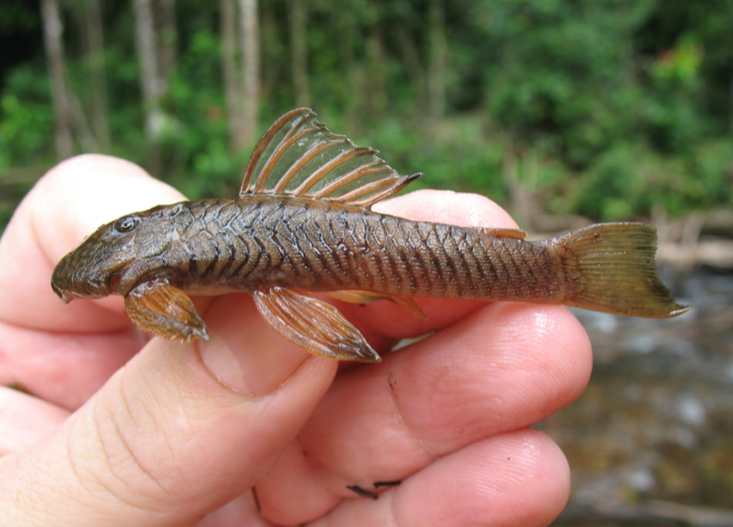
Guyanancistrus nassauensis, an endemic catfish

The nearby village of Nason is named after the mountain range.

In 2005, Guyanancistrus nassauensis, a new species of catfish, was discovered, and is endemic to the region.
