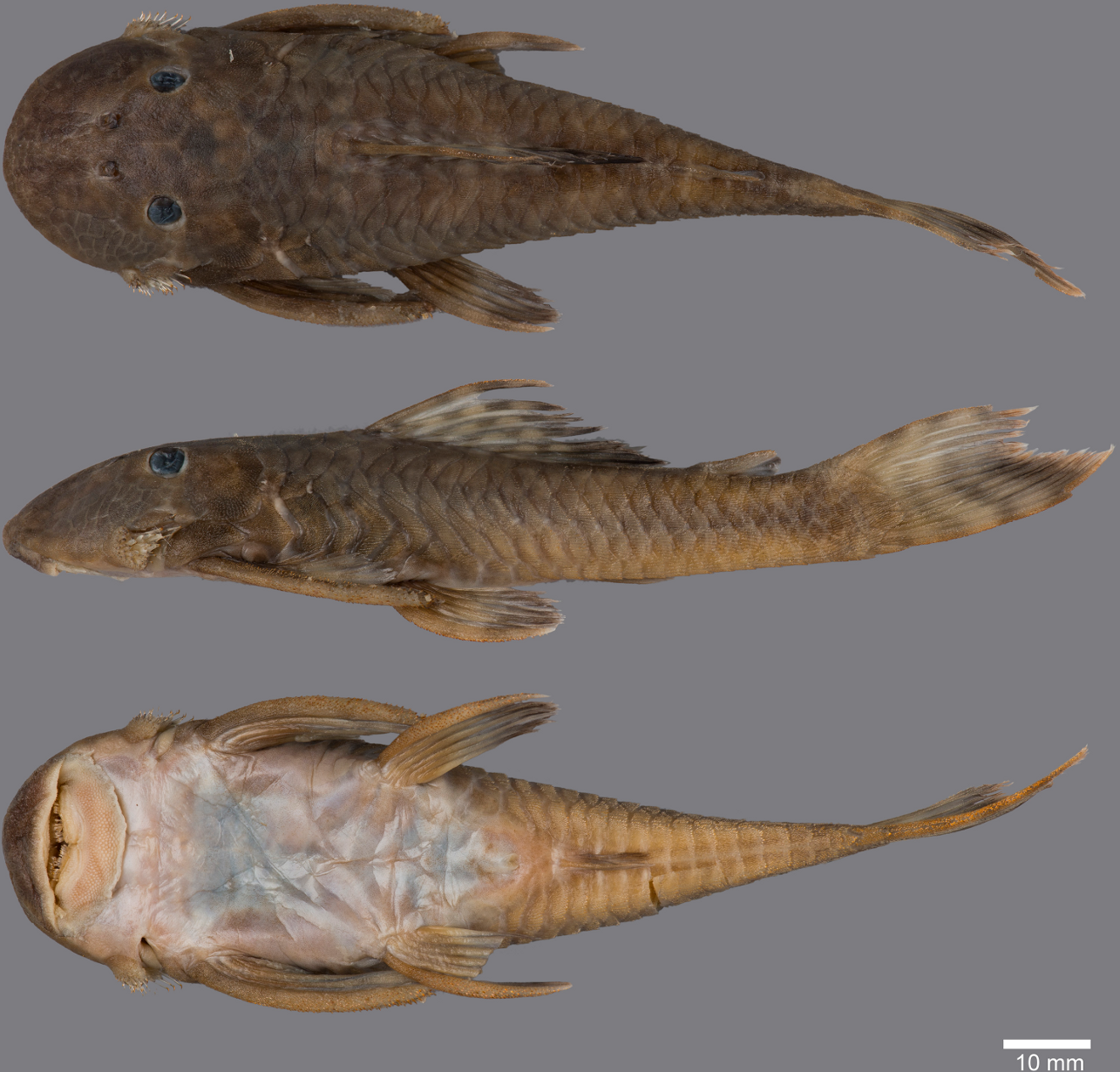

Scientific classification
- Kingdom: Animalia
- Phylum: Chordata
- Class: Actinopterygii
- Order: Siluriformes
- Family: Loricariidae
- Genus: Guyanancistrus
- Species: G. teretirostris

Binomial name
- Guyanancistrus teretirostris Fisch-Muller, Mol & Covain, 2018

= Guyanancistrus teretirostris =

Species of catfish

Guyanancistrus teretirostris is a species of catfish in the family Loricariidae. It is a freshwater fish native to South America, where it occurs in the upper Paru de Oeste River in Brazil. The species reaches 9.8 cm (3.9 inches) in standard length. Its specific epithet, teretirostris, is derived from Latin and refers to the rounded shape of the species' snout.
