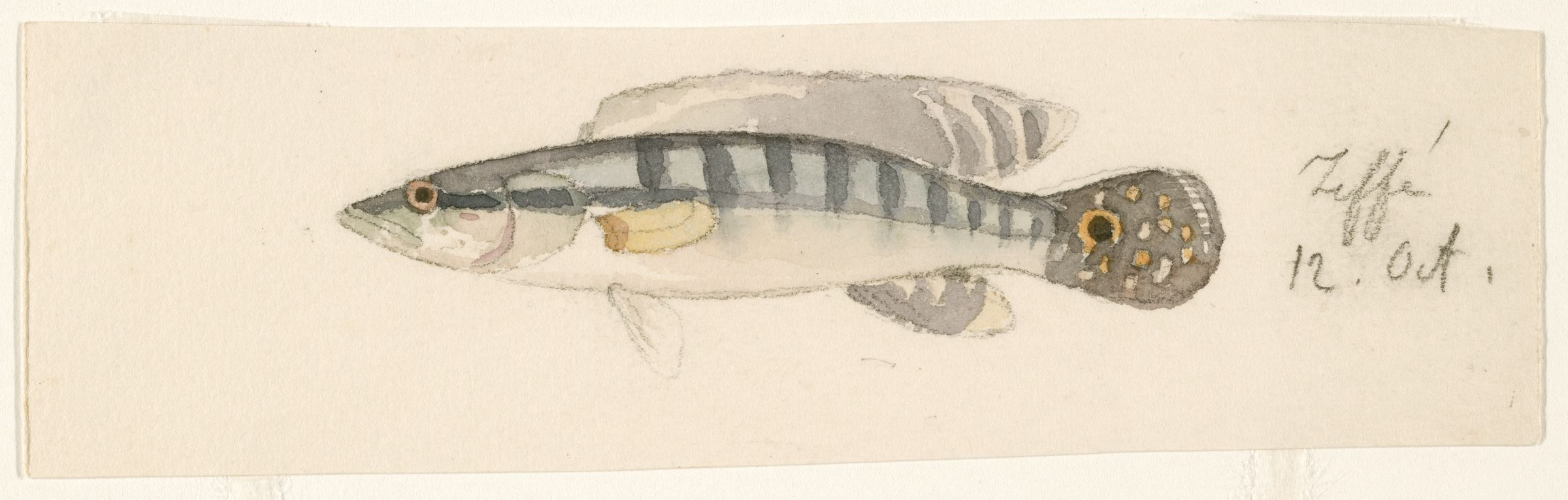
- 1865 watercolor illustration

Conservation status
- Least Concern (IUCN 3.1)

Scientific classification
- Kingdom: Animalia
- Phylum: Chordata
- Class: Actinopterygii
- Order: Cichliformes
- Family: Cichlidae
- Genus: Lugubria
- Species: L. cincta

Binomial name
- Lugubria cincta Regan, 1905

Synonyms
- Crenicichla cincta

= Lugubria cincta =

Species of fish

Lugubria cincta is a species of cichlid native to South America. It is found in the Amazon River basin in Brazil, Peru, and Ecuador, from the Napo River to Marajó Island. This species reaches a length of 19.5 cm (7.7 in).
