= Lugubria phaiospilus =

Conservation status
- Least Concern (IUCN 3.1)

Scientific classification
- Kingdom: Animalia
- Phylum: Chordata
- Class: Actinopterygii
- Order: Cichliformes
- Family: Cichlidae
- Genus: Lugubria
- Species: L. phaiospilus

Binomial name
- Lugubria phaiospilus S. O. Kullander, 1991

Synonyms
- Crenicichla phaiospilus

Species of fish

Lugubria phaiospilus is a species of cichlid native to South America. It is found in the Amazon River basin, in the Xingu River drainage at Cachoeira von Martius and Goritire, Brazil. This species reaches a length of 24 cm (9.4 in).
