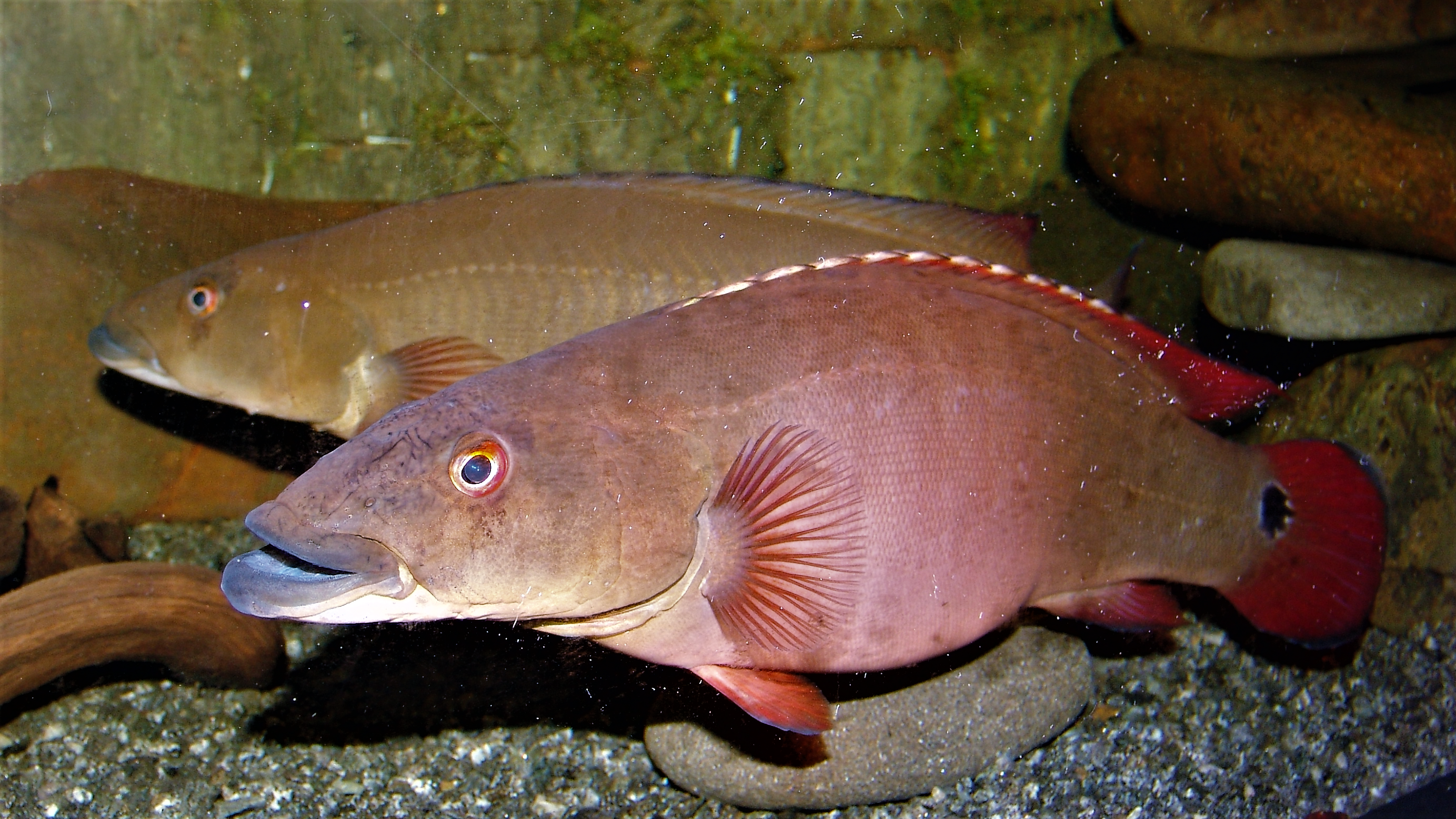
- Lugubria lugubris ssp. atabapo

Scientific classification
- Kingdom: Animalia
- Phylum: Chordata
- Class: Actinopterygii
- Division: Teleostei
- Order: Cichliformes
- Family: Cichlidae
- Subfamily: Cichlinae
- Tribe: Geophagini
- Genus: Lugubria; Varella, Kullander, Menezes, López-Fernández & Oliveira, 2023

Type species
- Crenicichla lugubris Heckel, 1840

= Lugubria =

Genus of fishes

Lugubria is a South American cichlid genus in the tribe Geophagini. It was introduced by four South American ichthyologists and their Swedish colleague S. O. Kullander, and the name is a near-tautonym of the chosen type species. Previously, the species placed in Lugubria belonged to the genus Crenicichla and formed the Crenicichla lugubris species complex. The genus occurs throughout the Amazon Basin, in the catchment of the Orinoco and in the coastal rivers of the three Guyanas.

== Characteristics ==
Like all pike cichlids, the Lugubria species have a pike-like, elongated body. They are relatively large pike cichlids and reach a standard length of 22.5 to 30 centimetres (8.9 to 11.8 in). Their scales are relatively small, which means that a row of scales on the sides of the body consists of a very large number of scales. The number of soft rays in the dorsal and anal fins is also high (13 to 18 and 9 to 13 respectively). The number of vertebrae is high (39 to 44) and there are more trunk vertebrae than caudal vertebrae, whereas the opposite is true in most other cichlid genera. The genus Lugubria differs from Saxatilia in that it lacks a dark spot above the base of the pectoral fin; however, most Lugubria species show this spot in front of the base of the pectoral fin when they are older. In contrast to Hemeraia and Teleocichla, in Lugubria the infraorbitals 4 and 5 (bones below the eye socket) are not fused together. In Lugubria the rear edge of the supracleithrum, a bone in the shoulder girdle, is not serrated, in Wallaciia it is serrated. Lugubria differs from Crenicichla (subgenus Batrachops) by the lack of a net-like color pattern on the sides of the body. All scales covering the head of Lugubria are cycloid scales.

== Species ==
The following species belong to the genus Lugubria:

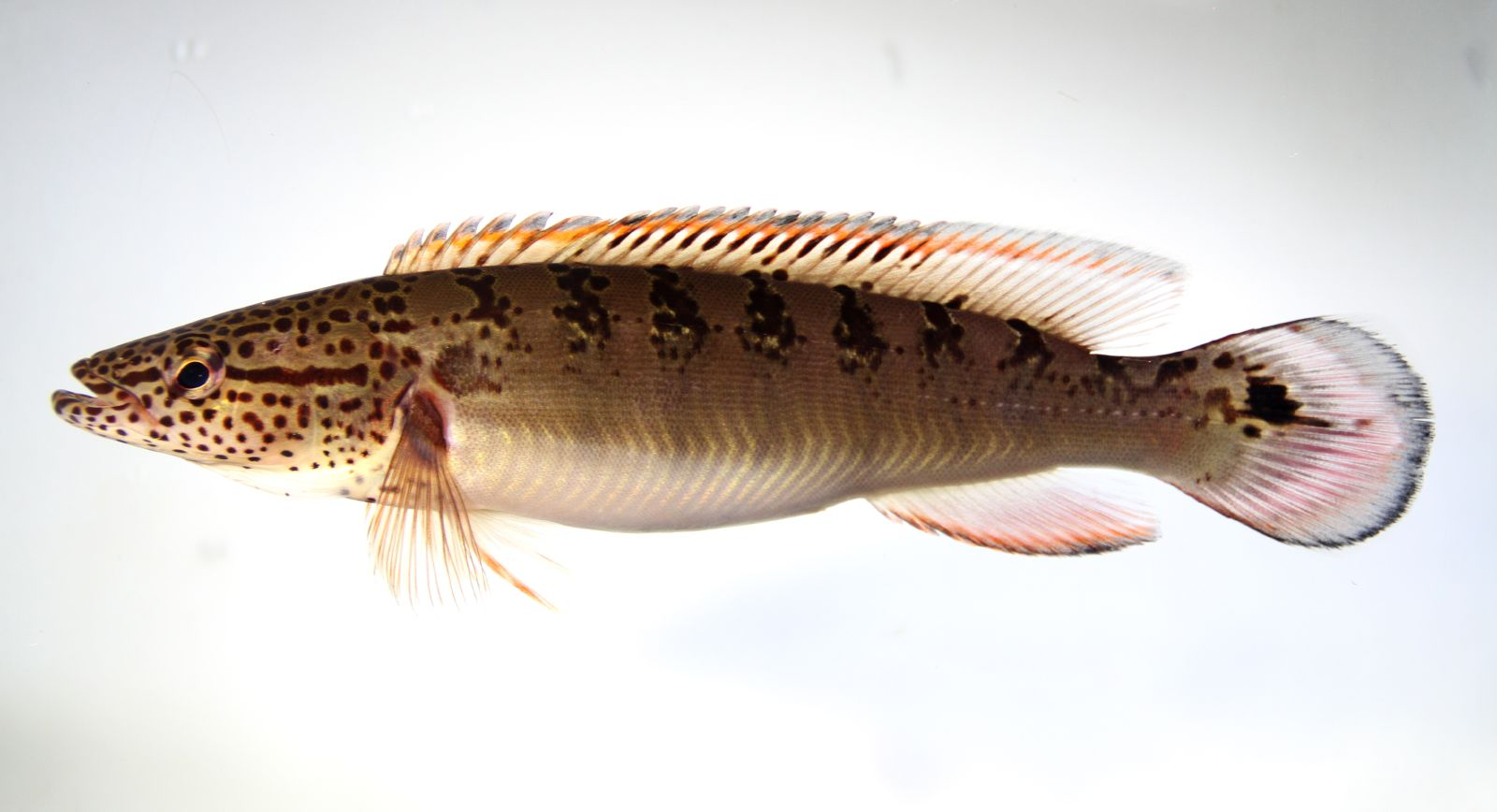
Lugubria lenticulata

- Lugubria acutirostris (Günther, 1862)
- Lugubria adspersa (Heckel, 1840)
- Lugubria cincta (Regan, 1905)
- Lugubria dandara (Varella & Ito, 2018)
- Lugubria johanna (Heckel, 1840)
- Lugubria lenticulata (Heckel, 1840)
- Lugubria lugubris (Heckel, 1840)
- Lugubria marmorata (Pellegrin, 1904)
- Lugubria monicae (Kullander & Varella, 2015)
- Lugubria multispinosa (Pellegrin, 1903)
- Lugubria percna (Kullander, 1991)
- Lugubria phaiospilus (Kullander, 1991)
- Lugubria rosemariae (Kullander, 1997)
- Lugubria strigata (Günther, 1862)
- Lugubria ternetzi (Norman, 1926)
- Lugubria tigrina (Ploeg, Jegu & Ferreira, 1991)
