= Lugubria adspersa =

Conservation status
- Least Concern (IUCN 3.1)

Scientific classification
- Kingdom: Animalia
- Phylum: Chordata
- Class: Actinopterygii
- Order: Cichliformes
- Family: Cichlidae
- Genus: Lugubria
- Species: L. adspersa

Binomial name
- Lugubria adspersa (Heckel, 1840)

Synonyms
- Crenicichla adspersa

Species of fish

Lugubria adspersa is a species of cichlid native to South America. Found in the Amazon River basin and in the Guaporé River basin. This species reaches a length of 29 cm (11 in).
