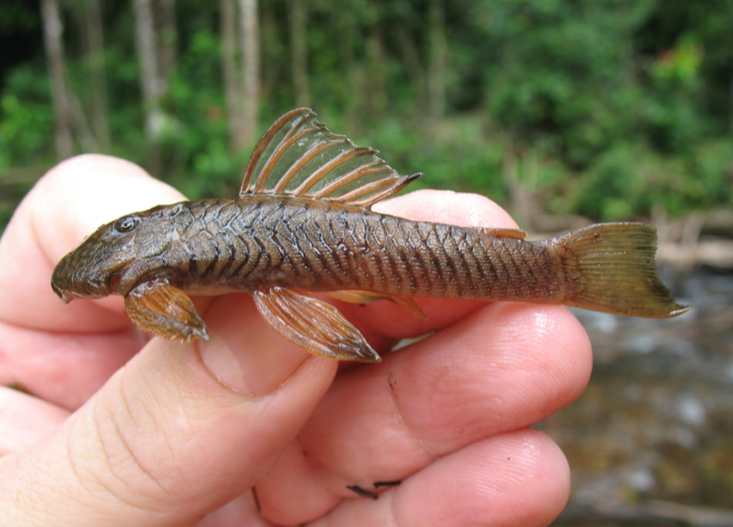
- Guyanancistrus nassauensis

Scientific classification
- Kingdom: Animalia
- Phylum: Chordata
- Class: Actinopterygii
- Order: Siluriformes
- Family: Loricariidae
- Subfamily: Hypostominae
- Genus: Guyanancistrus; Isbrücker, 2001

Type species
- Lasiancistrus brevispinis Heitmans, Nijssen & Isbrücker 1983

= Guyanancistrus =

Genus of fishes

Guyanancistrus is a genus of freshwater ray-finned fish belonging to the family Loricariidae, the suckermouth armoured catfishes, and the subfamily Hypostominae, the suckermouth catfishes. The catfishes in this genus are found in South America.

== Species ==
Guyanancistrus contains the following valid species:

- Guyanancistrus brevispinis (Heitmans, Nijssen & Isbrücker, 1983)
- Guyanancistrus brownsbergensis Mol, Fisch-Muller & Covain, 2018
- Guyanancistrus longispinis (Heitmans, Nijssen & Isbrücker, 1983)
- Guyanancistrus megastictus Fisch-Muller, Mol & Covain, 2018
- Guyanancistrus nassauensis Mol, Fisch-Muller & Covain, 2018
- Guyanancistrus niger (Norman, 1926)
- Guyanancistrus tenuis Fisch-Muller, Mol & Covain, 2018
- Guyanancistrus teretirostris Fisch-Muller, Mol & Covain, 2018
