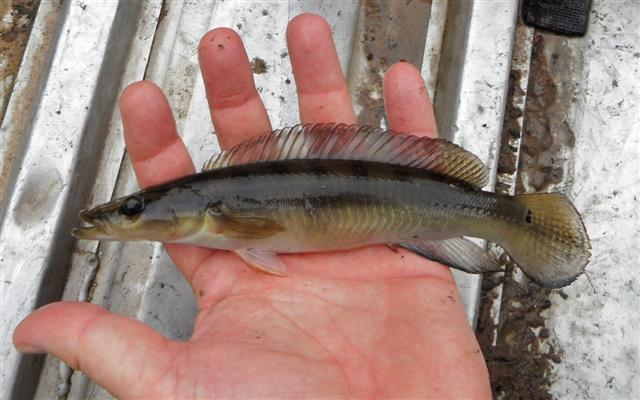

Conservation status
- Least Concern (IUCN 3.1)

Scientific classification
- Kingdom: Animalia
- Phylum: Chordata
- Class: Actinopterygii
- Order: Cichliformes
- Family: Cichlidae
- Genus: Lugubria
- Species: L. johanna

Binomial name
- Lugubria johanna (Heckel, 1840)

Synonyms
- Crenicichla johanna

= Lugubria johanna =

Species of fish

Lugubria johanna is a species of cichlid native to South America. This species reaches a length of 28 cm (11 in).
