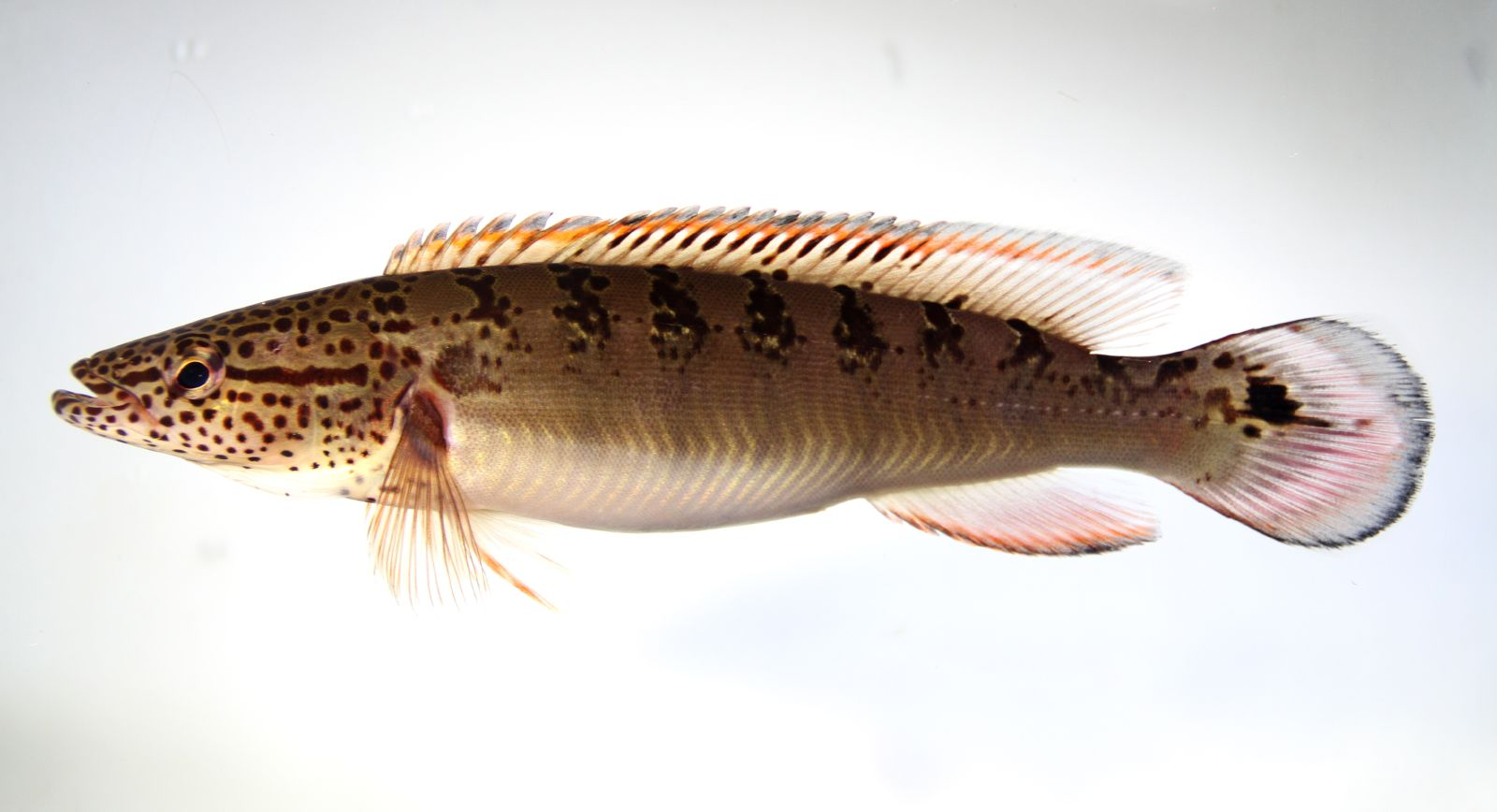

Conservation status
- Least Concern (IUCN 3.1)

Scientific classification
- Kingdom: Animalia
- Phylum: Chordata
- Class: Actinopterygii
- Order: Cichliformes
- Family: Cichlidae
- Genus: Lugubria
- Species: L. lenticulata

Binomial name
- Lugubria lenticulata (Heckel, 1840)

Synonyms
- Crenicichla lenticulata

= Lugubria lenticulata =

Species of fish

Lugubria lenticulata is a species of cichlid native to South America. it is found in the Negro River basin of the Amazon River basin in Brazil. This species reaches a length of 30 cm (12 in).
