= Lugubria multispinosa =

Conservation status
- Least Concern (IUCN 3.1)

Scientific classification
- Kingdom: Animalia
- Phylum: Chordata
- Class: Actinopterygii
- Order: Cichliformes
- Family: Cichlidae
- Genus: Lugubria
- Species: L. multispinosa

Binomial name
- Lugubria multispinosa Pellegrin, 1903

Synonyms
- Crenicichla multispinosa

Species of fish

Lugubria multispinosa is a species of cichlid native to South America. It is found in the Maroni and Mana rivers of Suriname and French Guiana. This species reaches a length of 22.5 cm (8.9 in).
