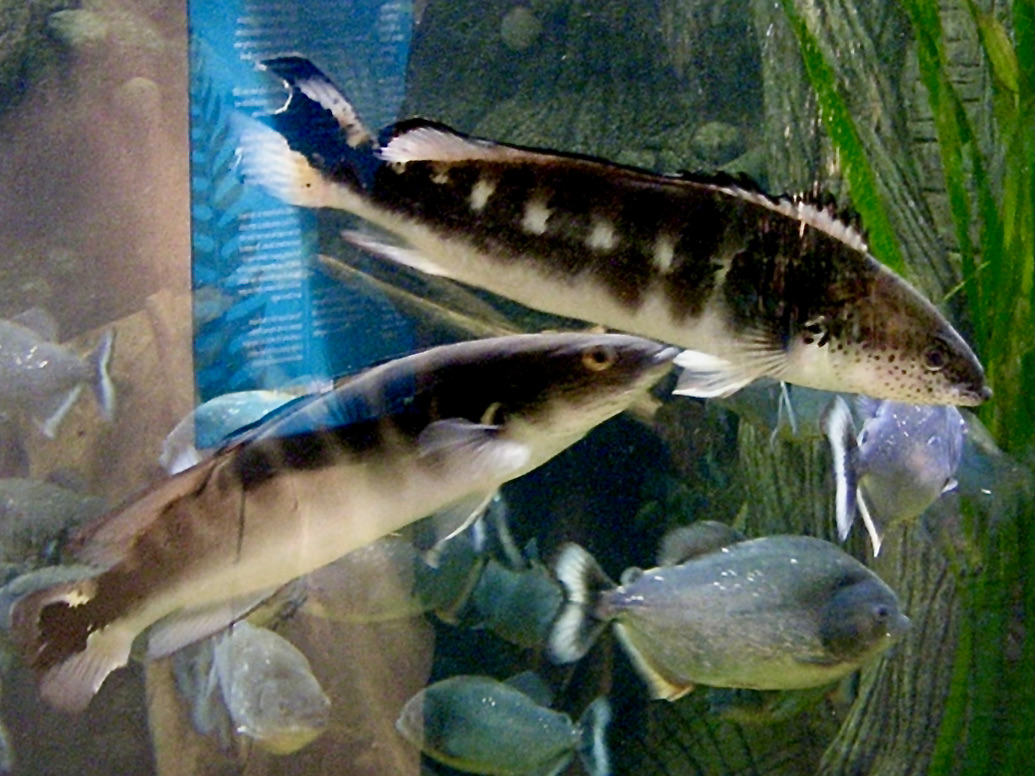

Conservation status
- Least Concern (IUCN 3.1)

Scientific classification
- Kingdom: Animalia
- Phylum: Chordata
- Class: Actinopterygii
- Order: Cichliformes
- Family: Cichlidae
- Genus: Lugubria
- Species: L. marmorata

Binomial name
- Lugubria marmorata Pellegrin, 1904

Synonyms
- Crenicichla marmorata

= Lugubria marmorata =

Species of fish

Lugubria marmorata is a species of cichlid native to South America. It is found in the Amazon River basin, only in the southern tributaries of the Amazon River in Brazil, from the Madeira River to the Tocantins River. This species reaches a length of 28 cm (11 in).
