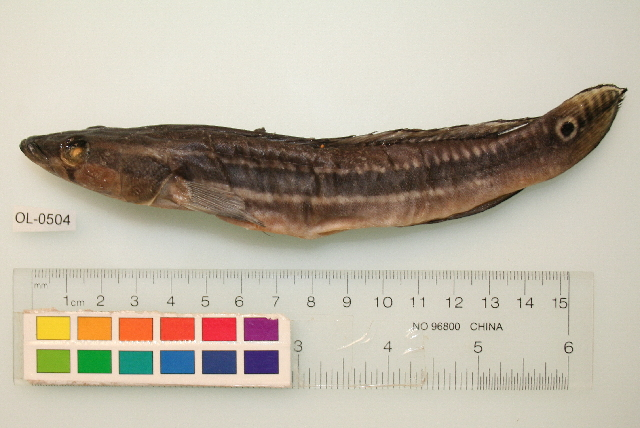
- Preserved specimen

Conservation status
- Least Concern (IUCN 3.1)

Scientific classification
- Kingdom: Animalia
- Phylum: Chordata
- Class: Actinopterygii
- Order: Cichliformes
- Family: Cichlidae
- Genus: Lugubria
- Species: L. tigrina

Binomial name
- Lugubria tigrina Ploeg, Jégu & E. J. G. Ferreira

Synonyms
- Crenicichla tigrina

= Lugubria tigrina =

Species of fish

Lugubria tigrina is a species of cichlid. It is native to the Amazon river basin in Brazil. This species reaches a standard length of 28 cm (11 in).
