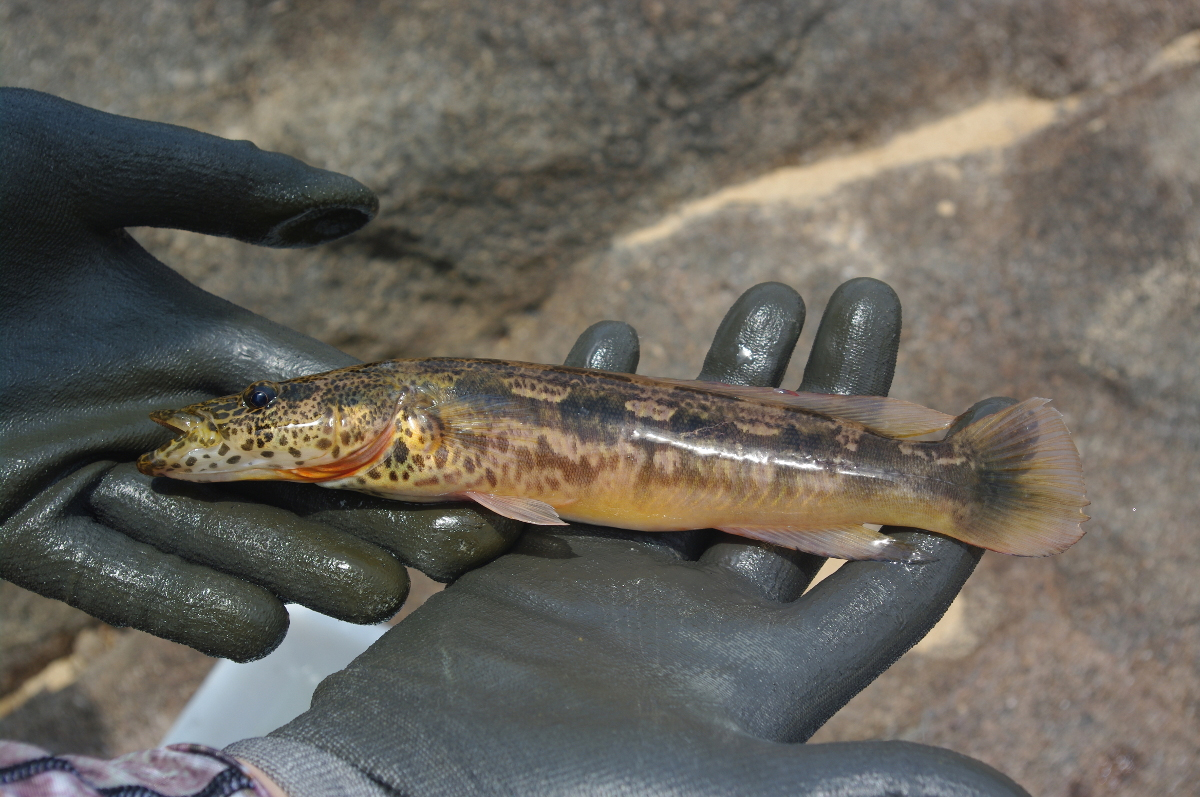

Conservation status
- Near Threatened (IUCN 3.1)

Scientific classification
- Kingdom: Animalia
- Phylum: Chordata
- Class: Actinopterygii
- Order: Cichliformes
- Family: Cichlidae
- Genus: Lugubria
- Species: L. percna

Binomial name
- Lugubria percna S. O. Kullander, 1991

Synonyms
- Crenicichla percna

= Lugubria percna =

Species of fish

Lugubria percna is a species of cichlid native to South America. It is found in the Amazon River basin, in the Xingu River at Cachoeira do Espelho and Altamira, Brazil. This species reaches a length of 22 cm (8.7 in).
