= Lugubria strigata =

Conservation status
- Least Concern (IUCN 3.1)

Scientific classification
- Kingdom: Animalia
- Phylum: Chordata
- Class: Actinopterygii
- Order: Cichliformes
- Family: Cichlidae
- Genus: Lugubria
- Species: L. strigata

Binomial name
- Lugubria strigata (Günther, 1862)

Synonyms
- Crenicichla strigata

Species of fish

Lugubria strigata is a species of cichlid native to the southern tributaries of the Amazon River basin in Brazil and Guyana. This species reaches a length of 30 cm (12 in).
