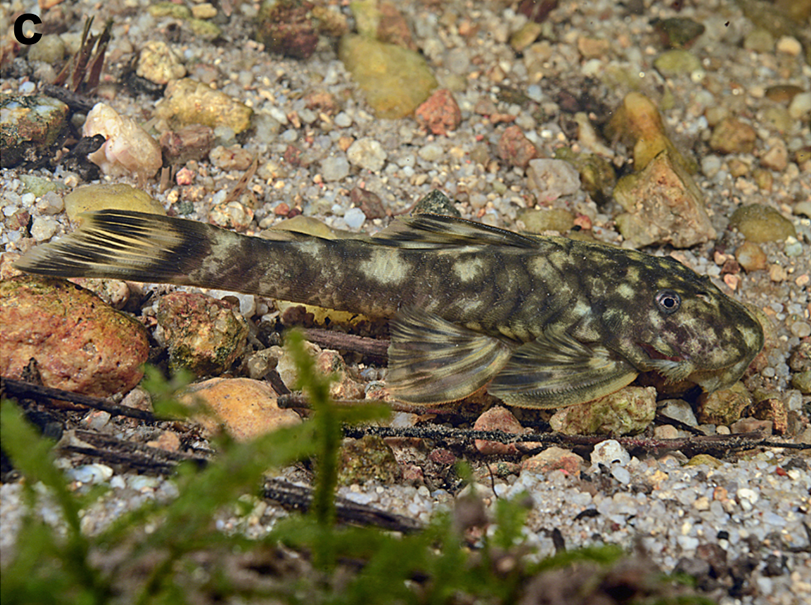

Scientific classification
- Kingdom: Animalia
- Phylum: Chordata
- Class: Actinopterygii
- Order: Siluriformes
- Family: Loricariidae
- Genus: Guyanancistrus
- Species: G. megastictus

Binomial name
- Guyanancistrus megastictus Fisch-Muller, Mol & Covain, 2018

= Guyanancistrus megastictus =

Species of catfish

Guyanancistrus megastictus is a species of catfish in the family Loricariidae. It is native to South America, where it occurs in a forested tributary of the upper Maroni basin in French Guiana, near the Mitaraka Massif, which is a prominent massif in the area. The species reaches 6.3 cm (2.5 inches) in standard length. Its specific epithet, megastictus, is derived from Ancient Greek and refers to its large spots.
