= Diana Pokie =

Surinamese politician

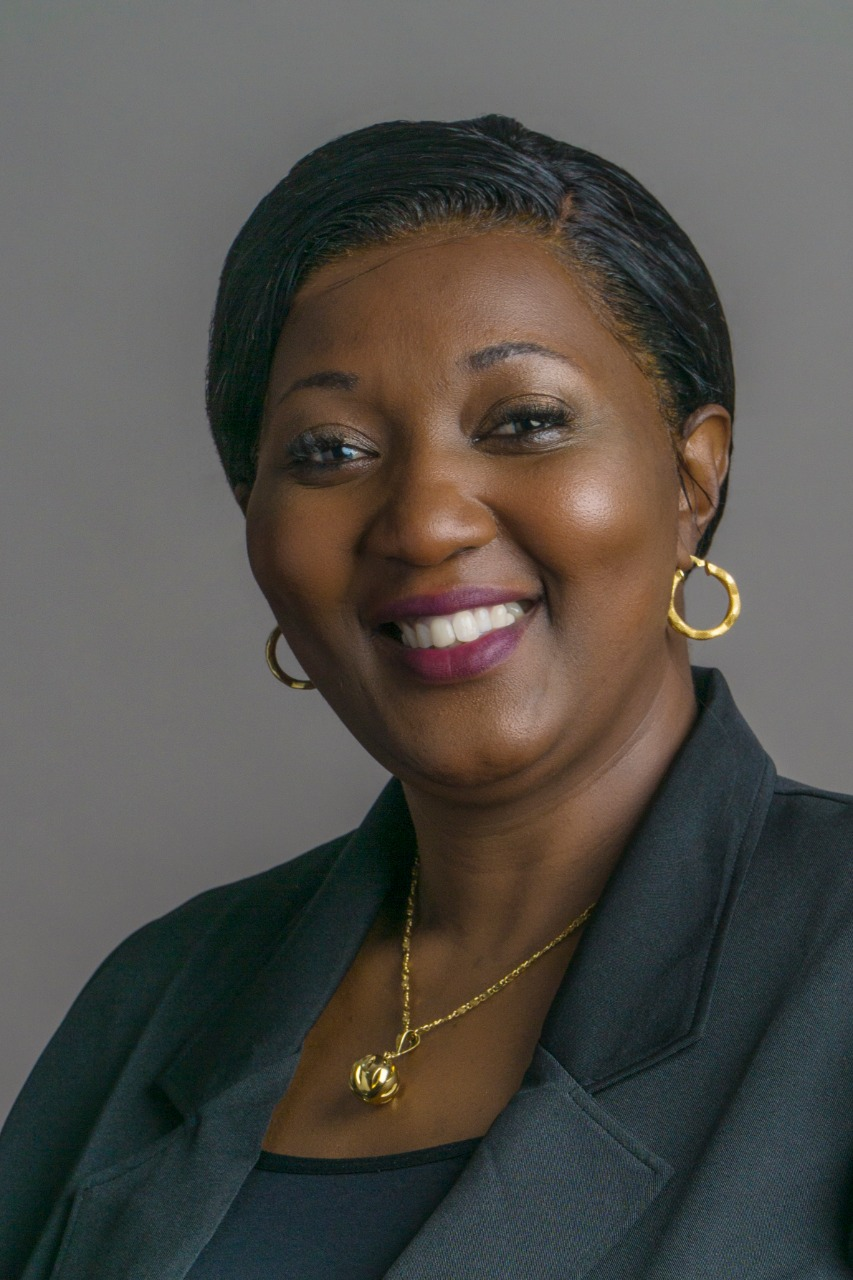
- Pokie in 2020

Minister of Land Policy and Forest Management
- In office 16 July 2020 – 3 August 2021
- Succeeded by: Dinotha Vorswijk

Member of the National Assembly
- Incumbent
- Assumed office 2005
- Constituency: Brokopondo District

Personal details
- Born: Diana Marilva Pokie; 1979 (age 46–47) Brownsweg, Suriname
- Party: General Liberation and Development Party (ABOP)
- Occupation: assembly member, teacher

Diana Marilva Pokie (born 1979) is a Surinamese politician. She was the assembly member from Brokopondo for the Brotherhood and Unity in Politics (BEP) before she was expelled. She returned to the assembly as the Brokopondo member representing the General Liberation and Development Party (ABOP) party. She became the first female vice-chairman of that party in 2019. On 16 July 2020, Pokie became Minister of Land and Forest Management. On 3 August 2021, Pokie was replaced by Dinotha Vorswijk.

== Biography ==
Pokie was born in 1979 in Brownsweg. In her youth, the family moved to Paramaribo. Pokie is a teacher by profession. She started her teaching career at VOJ Brokopondo where she worked for four years, and became vice president of VOJ Hockeystraat in Ramgoelam, Latour, Paramaribo.

In 2005 she became Assembly member for the Brotherhood and Unity in Politics party. Five years later she was elected but she fell out with her party. She lost her place as the BEP representative and she switched her allegiance to the General Liberation and Development Party (ABOP) in 2014 appearing in yellow and black and lauded by the leader, Ronnie Brunswijk. The following year she was elected again to the Assembly.

In 2017 while she was the MP, Brokopondo was chosen as the region to celebrate independence and Pokie was particularly pleased that they would be hosted at the largest village, Brownsweg, as that was her birthplace.

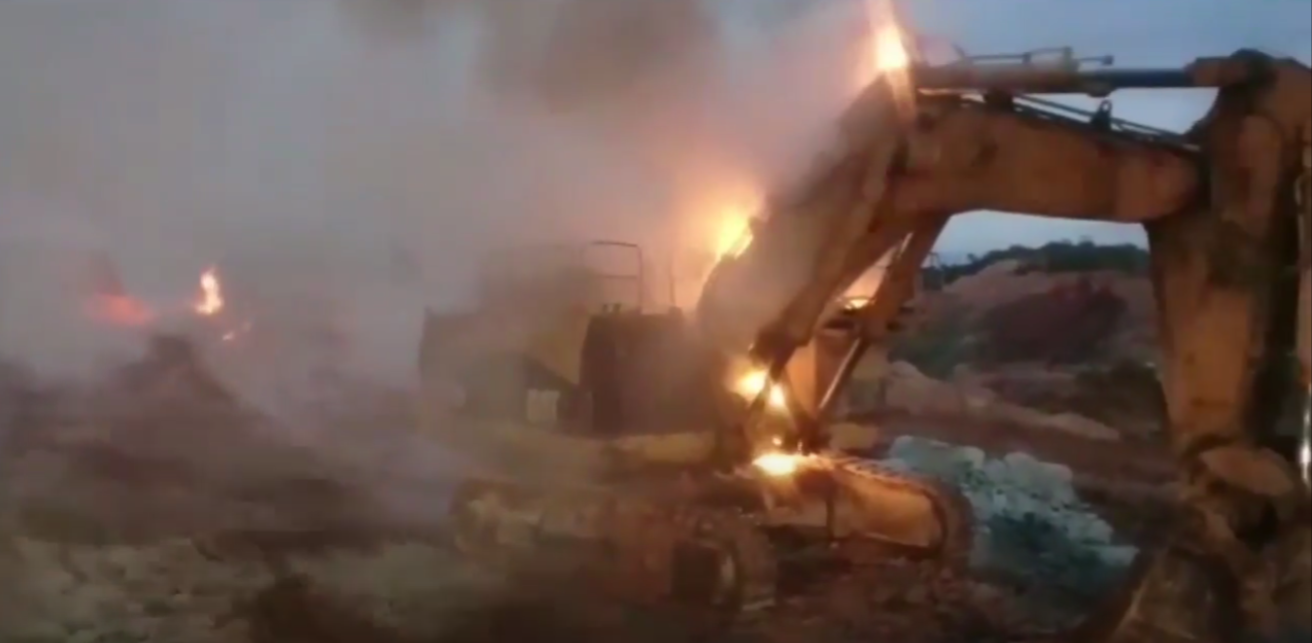
The result of protesting gold miners

In May 2019, she became the first female vice-chairman of the ABOP. She was called on that year to hear the complaints of local prospectors who had been moved on from the Canadian owned Rosebel gold mine in scenes where one man was killed. She called the local police action as dastardly and she asked the mine owners to find a solution and that they should feel responsible and they should pay compensation to the dead man's family.

In 2020 she was re-elected again for Brokopondo, this time there were two successful candidates from the ABOP party. The party also took two seats in Marowijne and in Sipaliwini. With the single seat in Para and Paramaribo, this brought the total to eight members in the assembly. On 16 July, Pokie became the Minister of Land and Forest Management. in the cabinet of Santokhi.

On 11 October 2020, Pokie became the first cabinet minister to test positive for SARS-CoV-2. She quarantined herself, but it was not disclosed whether she had been in contact with other ministers. Pokie announced that her term as minister ended on 16 July 2021. On 3 August 2021, Dinotha Vorswijk was installed as Minister of Land Policy and Forest Management.
