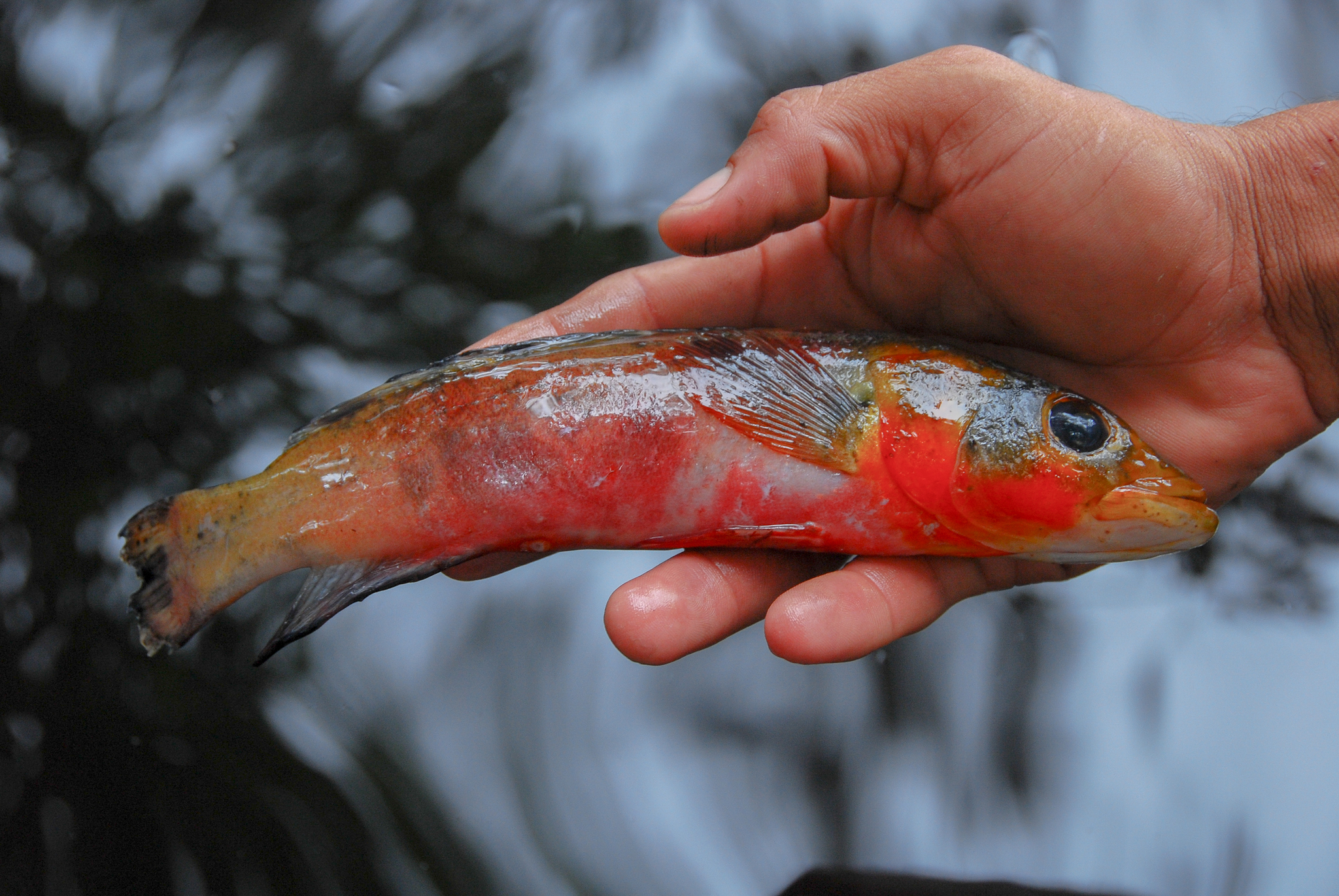

Conservation status
- Least Concern (IUCN 3.1)

Scientific classification
- Kingdom: Animalia
- Phylum: Chordata
- Class: Actinopterygii
- Order: Cichliformes
- Family: Cichlidae
- Genus: Lugubria
- Species: L. lugubris

Binomial name
- Lugubria lugubris (Heckel, 1840)

Subspecies
- Red Atabapo pike cichlid (Lugubria lugubris atabapo)

Synonyms
- Crenicichla lugubris Heckel, 1840; Crenicichla funebris Heckel, 1840; Cychla rutilens Jardine, 1843; Cichla rutilens Jardine, 1843; Cychla rutilans Jardine, 1843

= Lugubria lugubris =

Species of fish

The spottail pike cichlid (Lugubria lugubris) is a species of pike cichlid native to South America. It is found in the Amazon River basin, in the Branco, Negro and Uatumã rivers in Brazil; the Essequibo River and Branco River in Guyana; the Corantijn River in Suriname. This species reaches a length of 32.9 cm (13 in).

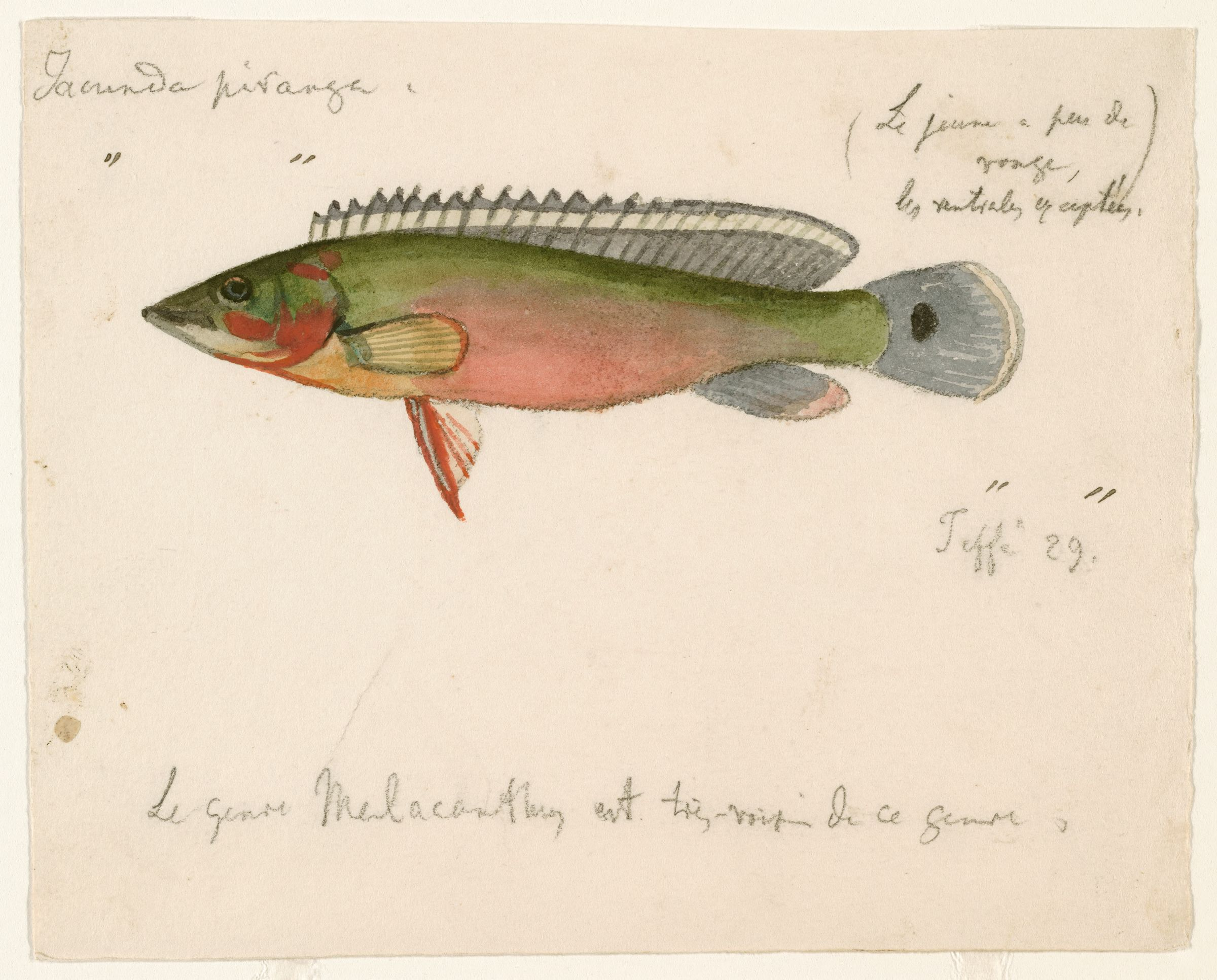
A 19th century watercolor painting by Jacques Burkhardt

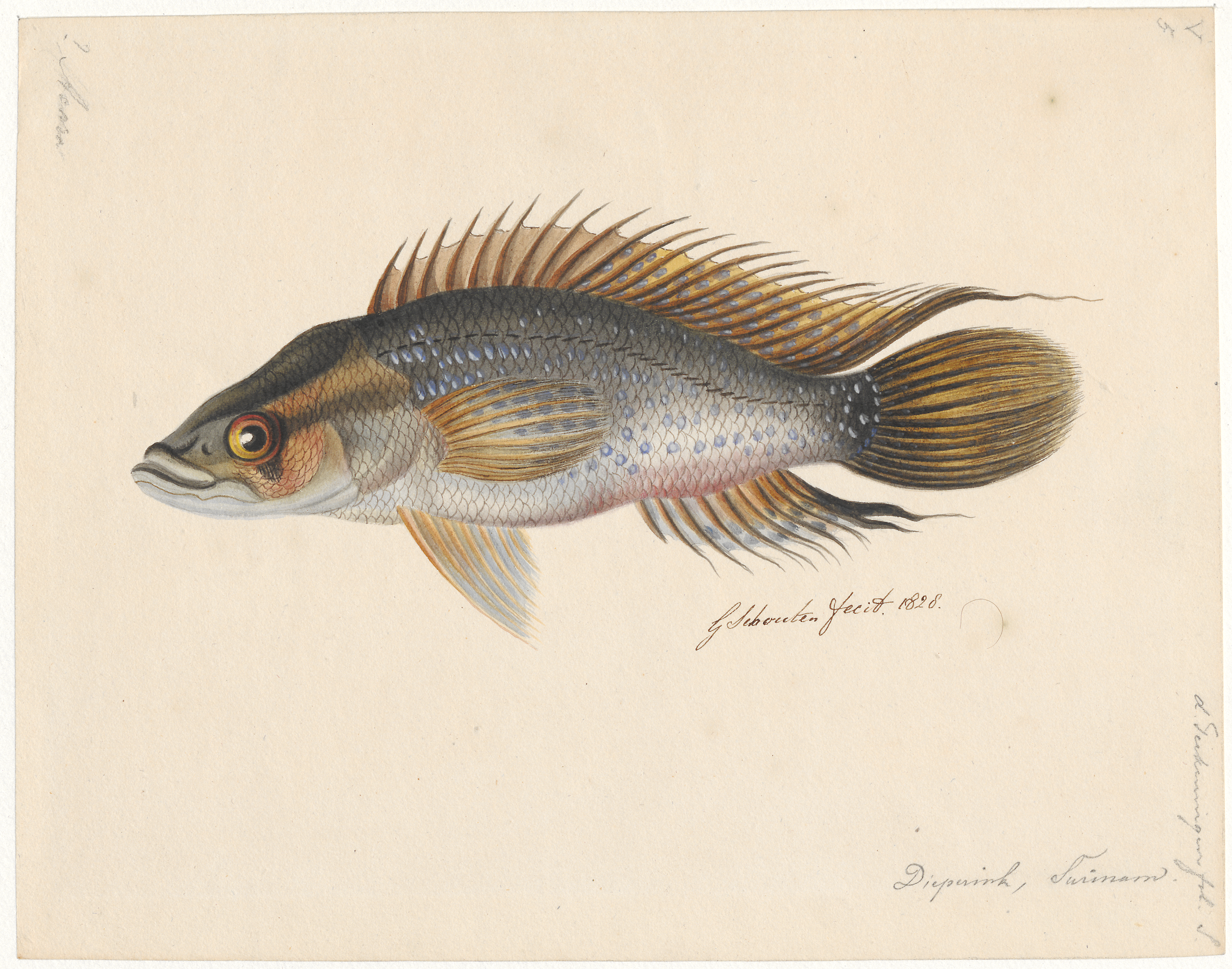
Print from 1828

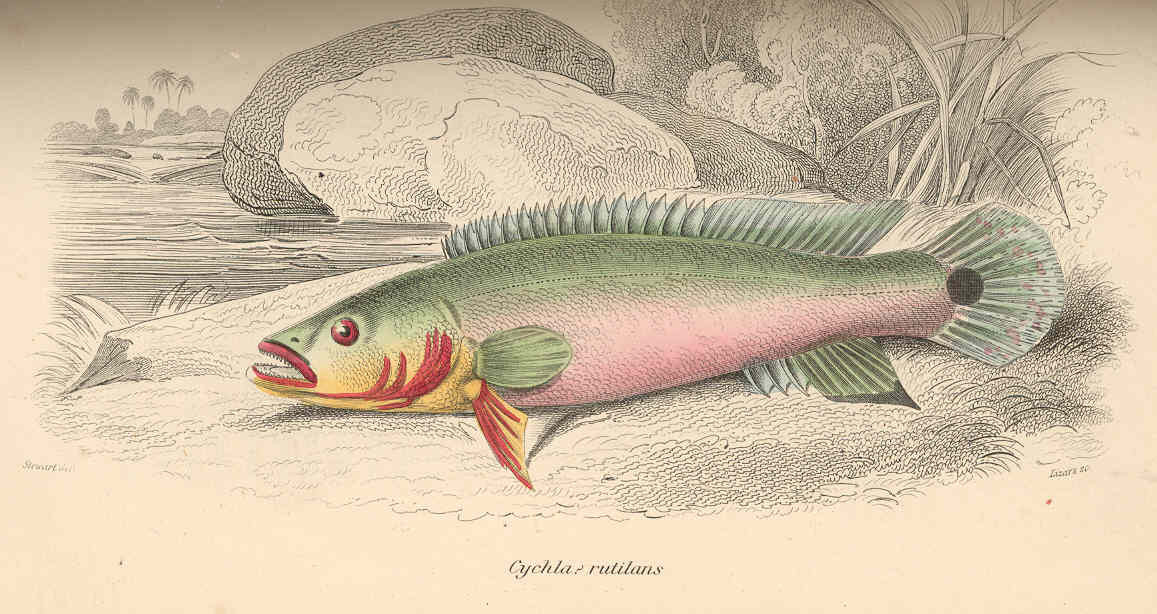
Print from 1860
