= Harttiella crassicauda =

Conservation status
- Endangered (IUCN 3.1)

Scientific classification
- Kingdom: Animalia
- Phylum: Chordata
- Class: Actinopterygii
- Order: Siluriformes
- Family: Loricariidae
- Genus: Harttiella
- Species: H. crassicauda

Binomial name
- Harttiella crassicauda (Boeseman, 1953)

Synonyms
- Harttia crassicaudaBoeseman, 1953

Species of fish

Harttiella crassicauda is a species of freshwater ray-finned fish belonging to the family Loricariidae, the suckermouth armored catfishes, and the subfamily Loricariinae, the mailed catfishes.

This species is only known from its type locality, the IJs-creek in the Nassau Mountains, in the Marowijne River drainage in Suriname. It has been found in a little forest creek over sandy and rocky bottoms. This fish was previously thought to be extinct after not being sighted for 50 years; however, this fish has since been re-discovered.

This species reaches a length of 4.9 centimetres (1.9 in) SL. Sexual dimorphism is similar to that of Harttia, in which mature males develop hypertrophied odontodes on the pectoral spines, along the margin of the snout, and on the entire body except for the abdominal region.
