= Lugubria ternetzi =

Conservation status
- Least Concern (IUCN 3.1)

Scientific classification
- Kingdom: Animalia
- Phylum: Chordata
- Class: Actinopterygii
- Order: Cichliformes
- Family: Cichlidae
- Genus: Lugubria
- Species: L. ternetzi

Binomial name
- Lugubria ternetzi Norman, 1926

Synonyms
- Crenicichla ternetzi

Species of fish

Lugubria ternetzi is a species of cichlid native to South America. It is found in the Oyapock River drainage in French Guiana and Brazil. This species reaches a length of 24.5 cm (9.6 in).
