= Brownsberg Nature Park =

- IUCN category II (national park)
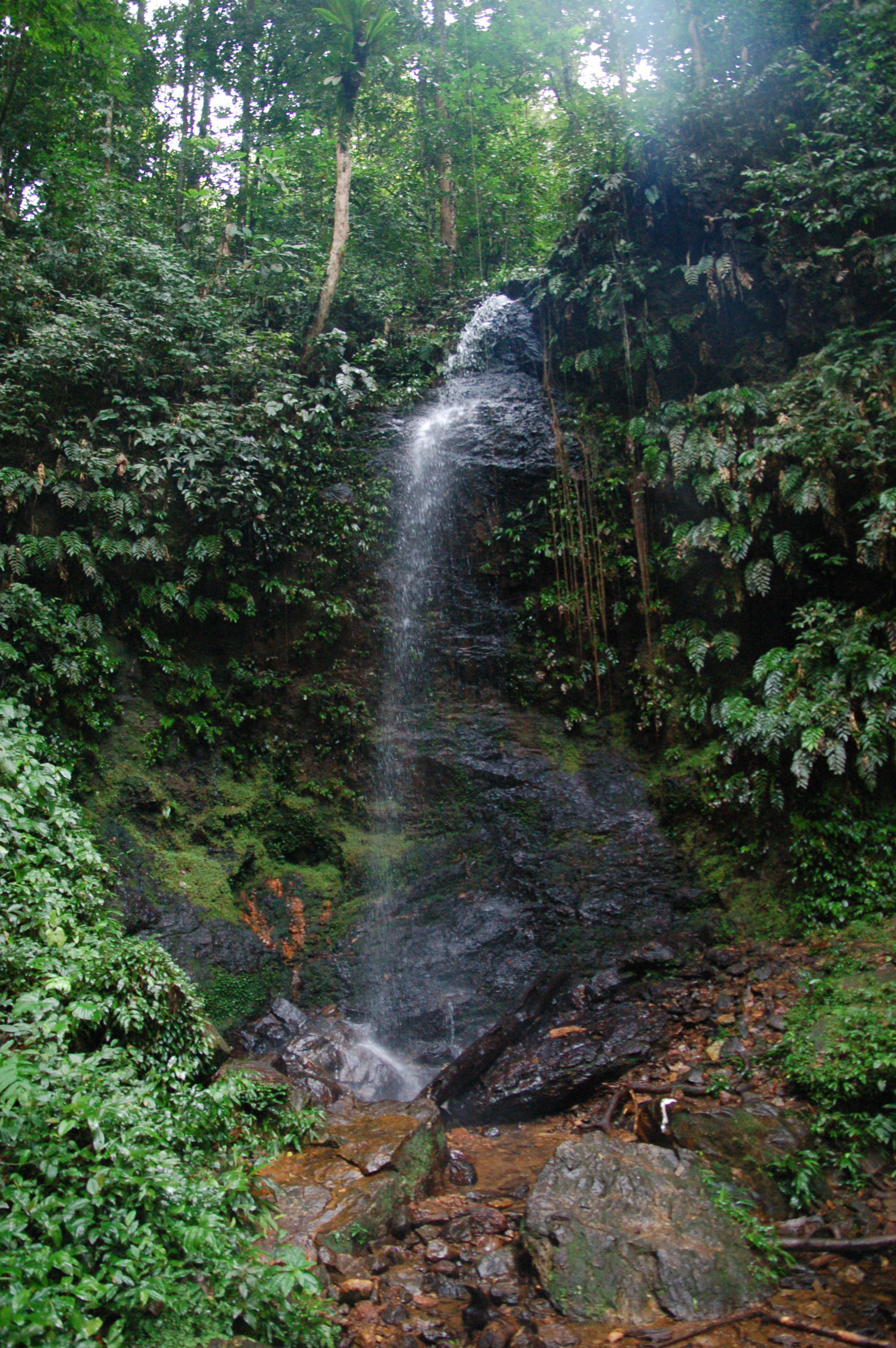
- The Leo Waterfall on the Brownsberg in Suriname

- Location within Suriname
- Location: Brokopondo District, Suriname
- Nearest city: Brownsweg
- Coordinates: 4.943°N 55.176°W
- Area: 122 km^{2} (47 sq mi)
- Established: 1969
- Visitors: 20,000
- Governing body: Stinasu

Brownsberg Nature Park is a nature park located in Suriname. The site measures 12,000 ha and is located in the district of Brokopondo around 130 km south from the capital city Paramaribo. The 500-meter high Brownsberg is the central point of the park. The site is located near the Brokopondo Reservoir. The park is managed by STINASU. Often the people of Suriname use the word Brownsberg as simple variant of Brownsberg Nature Park. Local people also write it as Bruijnsberg, pronounced as Braynsberg.

== History ==
At the end of the 19th century gold miners entered the area now known as Brownsberg Nature Park. One of the first was John Brown after whom both the park as well as the mountain (berg meaning mountain in Dutch) are named. After the miners left there was a failed attempt to mine bauxite. Since 1969 the site has been a nature reserve and has been managed by STINASU.

Gold mining is known to have occurred again since 1999. Action against the illegal miners was taken periodically, but high gold prices have led them to return.

== Geography ==
The geomorphological history of the area led to the current biodiversity of the park. It also left the gold deposits. The Brownsberg, located on the Mazaroni plateau, overlooks the Brokopondo Reservoir.

== Flora and fauna ==
The park is in the Guianan moist forests ecoregion. It has an estimated 1450 species of plants and 350 species of birds. Amongst the species present are howler monkeys, grey-winged trumpeters, toucans and red-rumped agoutis.

== Threats ==
In 2012 the World Wide Fund for Nature published a report on the nature park which stated that it was severely threatened by illegal gold mining. The organisation found fifty illegal sites of gold miners in three weeks. The number of illegal gold miners was estimated between 1500 and 2000 in the immediate years preceding 2012 by the head of the committee of Gold Mining Regulation. The number has risen due to higher gold prices. Mercury also attained the soil of the park.

== Tourism ==
The park receives around 20,000 visitors each year. Near the mountain there are several sleeping accommodations, an information center and restaurant. Starting at the mountain there are several paths leading to waterfalls and other waters.

== Bibliography ==
- De Dijn, Bart (2007). The Biodiversity of the Brownsberg. doi:10.1896/1-881173-98-4.135.
