= Desiré Delano Bouterse Highway =

Highway in Suriname

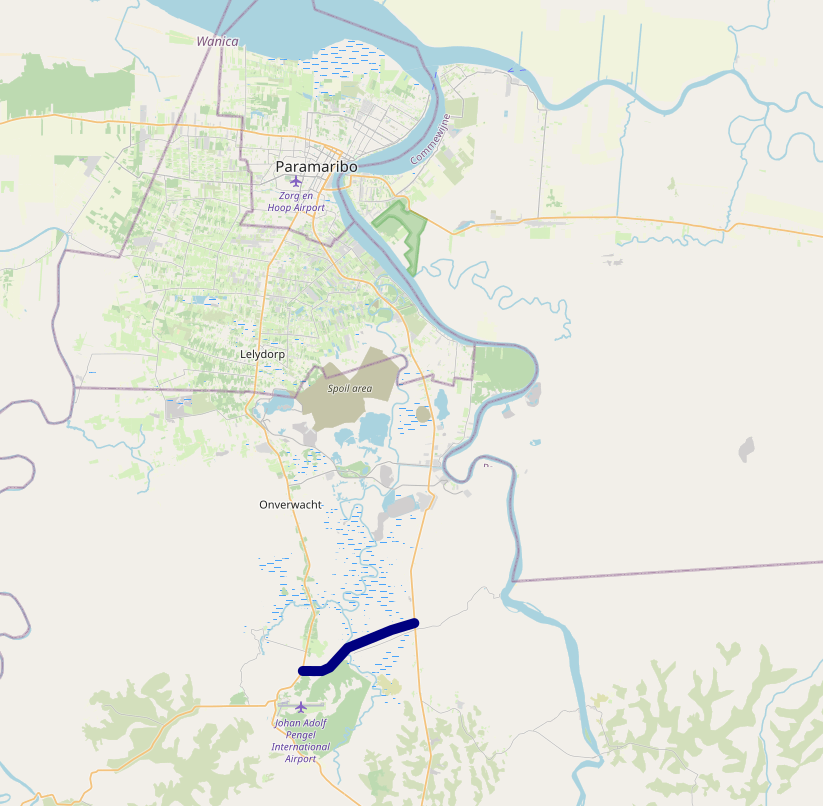
- Location of the Desiré Delano Bouterse Highway

Route information
- Length: 9.6 km (6.0 mi)

Major junctions
- East end: Avobakaweg to Paramaribo and Brokopondo
- West end: John F. Kennedyweg near the Airport

Location
- Country: Suriname
- Districts: Para

Highway system
- Transport in Suriname

The Desiré Delano Bouterse Highway is the first motorway in Suriname between Avobakaweg connecting Paramaribo and Brokopondo to the John F. Kennedyweg near Johan Adolf Pengel International Airport. The motorway opened on 15 May 2020 12:00.

A journey from Paramaribo to the airport used to take 1.5 to 2 hours. It is hoped that with the new highway, the travel time can be reduced to one hour. Construction of the road started in November 2017. The highway was named after President Dési Bouterse. who was president from 2010 to 2020.

The project had cost $60 million. The speed limit will be 80 km/h, and cameras will be placed on the road.

== Route ==
The motorway begins on an at grade intersection with the Avobakaweg leading to Paramaribo and Brokopondo, cross the Para Creek which flows into the Suriname River using the Hanover bridge, and end on an at grade intersection with the John F. Kennedyweg, located near the airport and giving access to the Southern East-West Link, thus avoiding the built-up areas of Lelydorp and Onverwacht. The road has 2x2 lanes without a hard shoulder over its entire length, and has no exits. The total length of the highway is 9.6 kilometers.

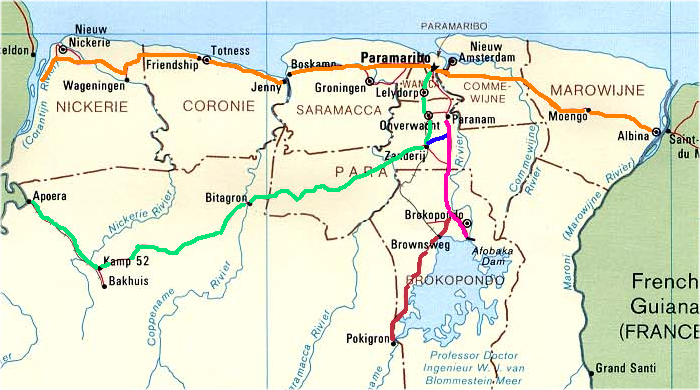
Main roads in Suriname: East-West / Southern East-West / Desiré Delano Bouterse Highway / Avobakaweg / Ghaama Agbagoweg
