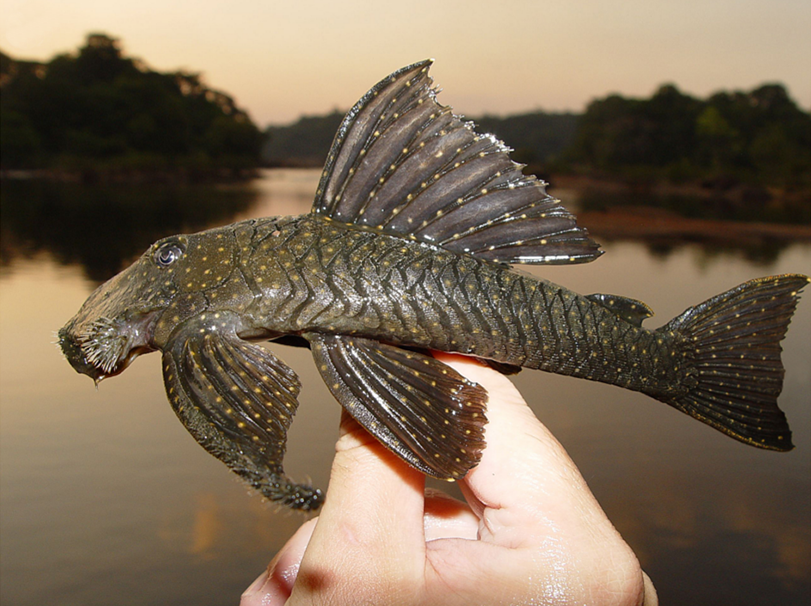

Conservation status
- Least Concern (IUCN 3.1)

Scientific classification
- Kingdom: Animalia
- Phylum: Chordata
- Class: Actinopterygii
- Order: Siluriformes
- Family: Loricariidae
- Genus: Guyanancistrus
- Species: G. niger

Binomial name
- Guyanancistrus niger (Norman, 1926)

Synonyms
- Hemiancistrus niger; Lasiancistrus niger; Pseudancistrus niger

= Guyanancistrus niger =

Species of catfish

Guyanancistrus niger is a species of catfish in the family Loricariidae that is of disputed classification. It is native to South America, where it occurs in the Oyapock basin in French Guiana. Though reportedly uncommon, it is typically seen in rapids where the species Pseudancistrus barbatus is also present, although the ecological relationship between the two is not known. The species reaches 15.9 cm (6.3 in) in standard length, although it has been reported to reach 25.4 cm (10 inches), and it may be a facultative air-breather.

Guyanancistrus niger was initially described as a species of Hemiancistrus in 1926. It has subsequently been classified under Guyanancistrus, Lasiancistrus, and Pseudancistrus, where it is still listed by sources such as FishBase. Despite these reclassifications, a 2018 taxonomic review of Guyanancistrus recognized G. niger as a valid member of the genus.

Guyanancistrus niger sometimes appears in the aquarium trade, where it is often referred to either as the black wing pleco or by its associated L-number, which is L-039.
