= Brownsberg =

Mountain range in Suriname

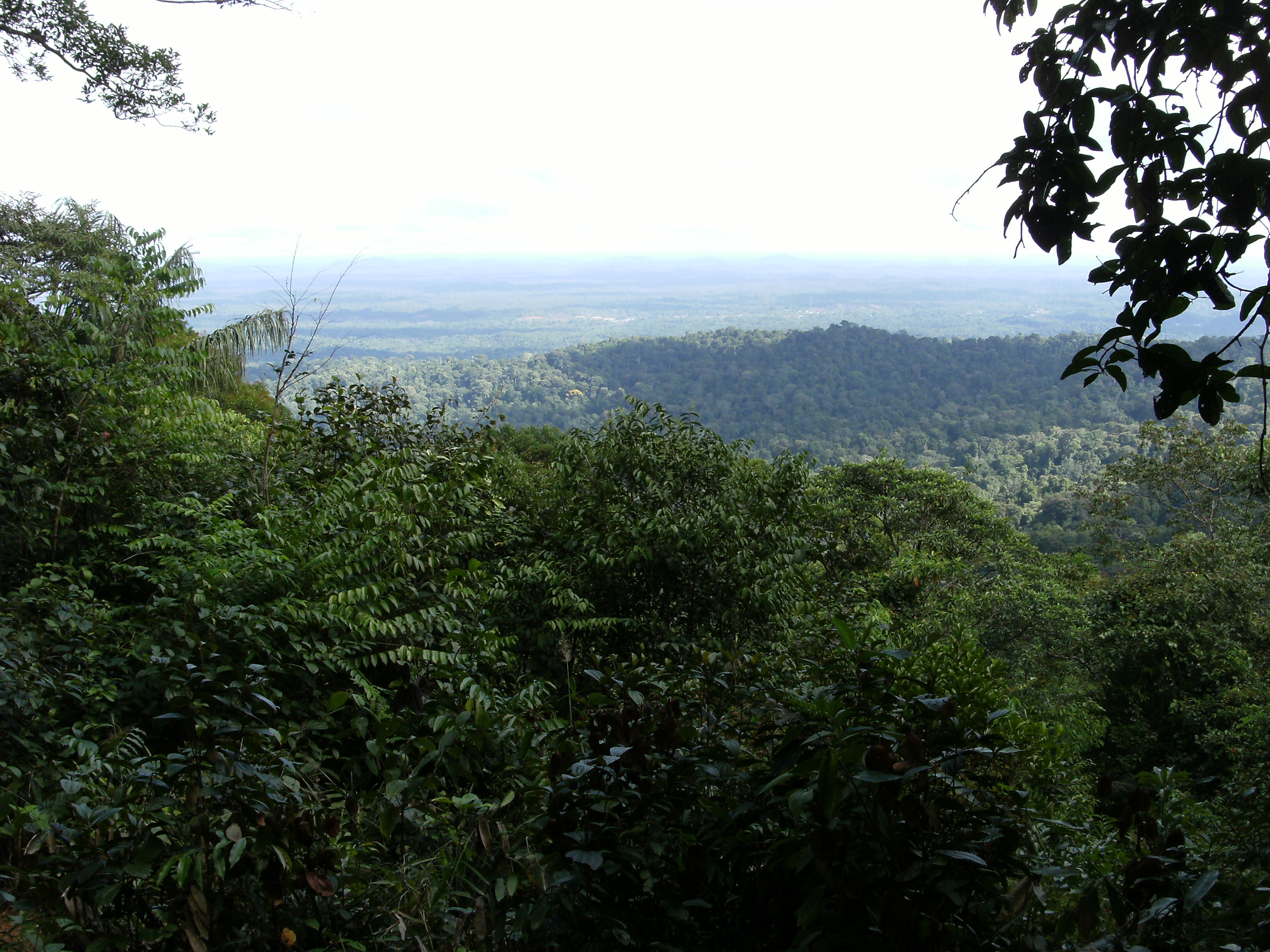
- The view from the Brownsberg

Highest point
- Elevation: 515 m (1,690 ft)
- Coordinates: 4.9°N 55.22°W

Geography
- Location within Suriname
- Location: Brownsweg, Brokopondo, Suriname

Brownsberg is a 515 metres high mountain in the Brokopondo District of Suriname. It is the namesake of the Brownsberg Nature Park. The mountain has been named after John Brown, a 19th-century gold miner.

== Overview ==
Brownsberg is almost flat on top, because it is covered by a laterite cap which prevents erosion. The mountain is covered in rainforests, and has several waterfalls. It is home to a great variety of animals. 116 mammal species were recorded including eight species of monkeys, two of which are endemic to the Guiana Shield. 387 birds species have been recorded including the harpy eagle (harpia harpyja), scarlet macaw (ara macao), blue-cheeked parrot (amazona dufresniana), and the olive-sided flycatcher (contopus cooperi).

Brownsberg can be reached from the town of Brownsweg. Stoneiland, a tourist resort and beach, is located at the foot of the mountain.

== Bibliography ==
- De Dijn, Bart (2007). Mol, Jan H.; Alonso, Leeanne E. (eds.). The Biodiversity of the Brownsberg. doi:10.1896/1-881173-98-4. ISBN 978-1-881173-98-4.
- Ouboter, Paul E. (2001). "Directory of protected areas of Suriname". IBER.
