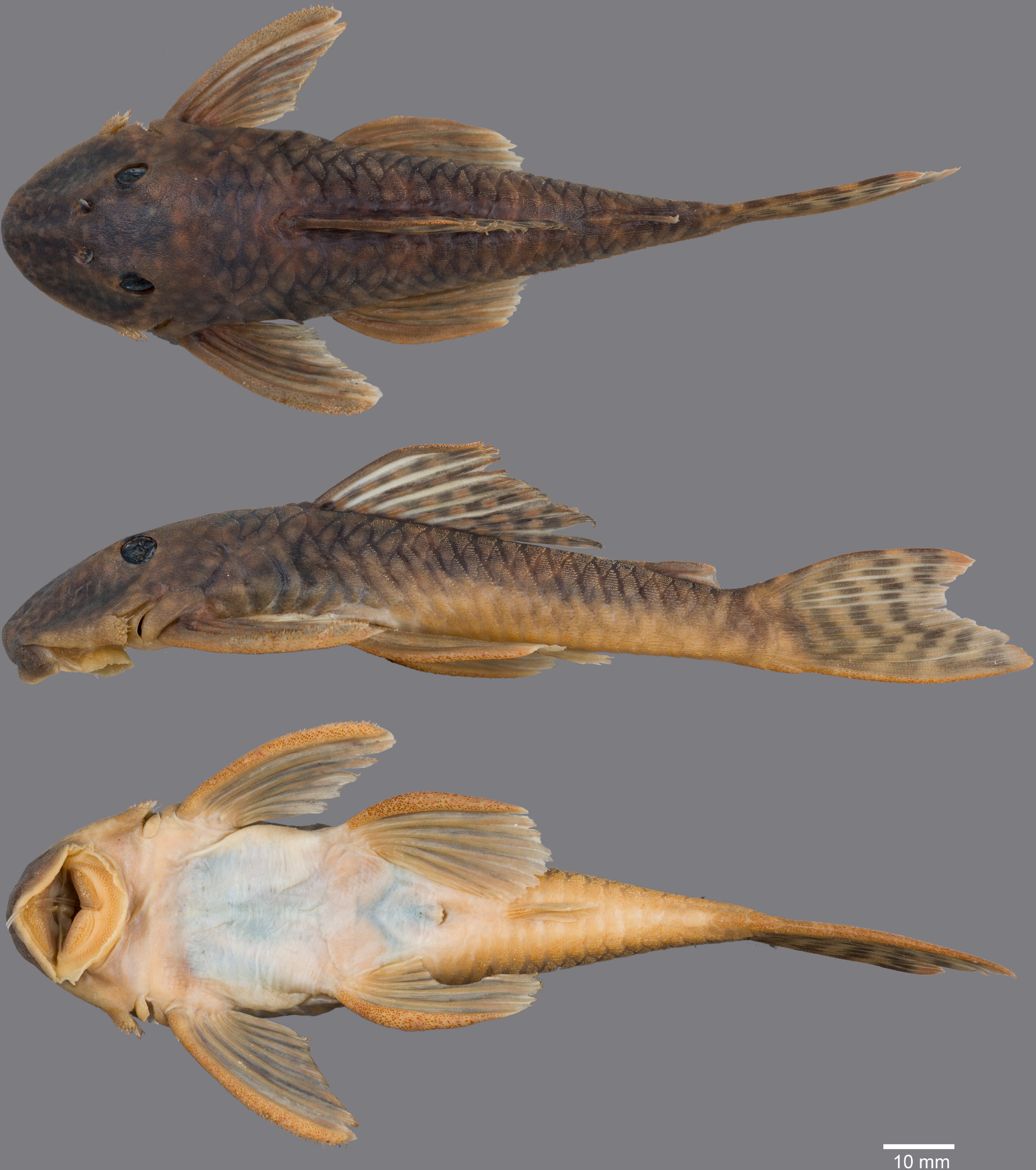

Scientific classification
- Kingdom: Animalia
- Phylum: Chordata
- Class: Actinopterygii
- Order: Siluriformes
- Family: Loricariidae
- Genus: Guyanancistrus
- Species: G. brevispinis

Binomial name
- Guyanancistrus brevispinis (Heitmans, Nijssen & Isbrücker, 1983)

Synonyms
- Lasiancistrus brevispinis; Pseudancistrus brevispinis

= Guyanancistrus brevispinis =

Species of catfish

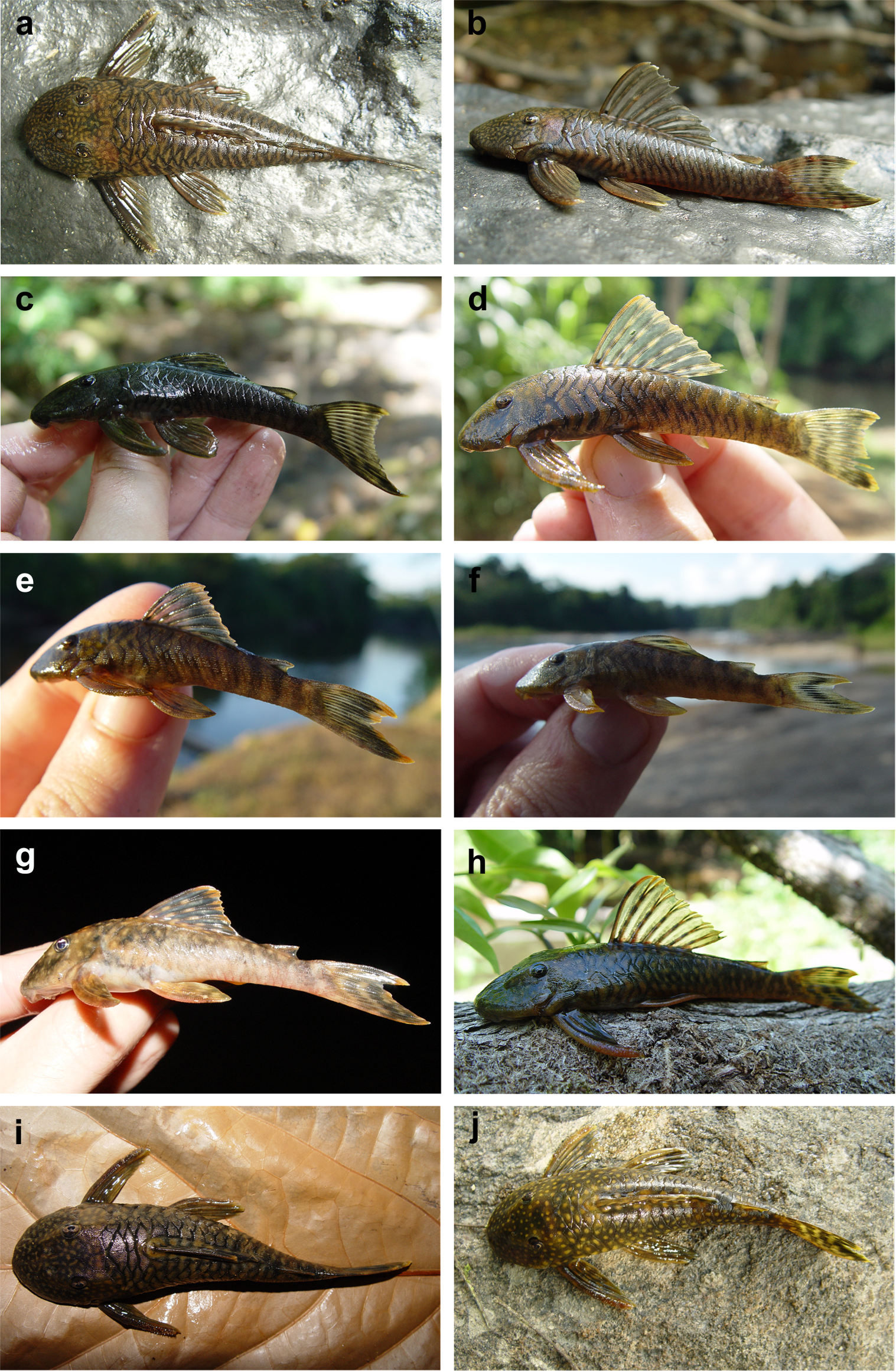
Various specimens of Guyanancistrus brevispinis.

Guyanancistrus brevispinis is a species of catfish in the family Loricariidae. It is a freshwater fish native to South America, where it occurs in the Atlantic coastal drainages of the Guianas, ranging from the Nickerie River basin to the Oyapock basin in French Guiana and Suriname. It has also been reported from Guyana, but this is believed to be a misidentification. The species is considered the most common and abundant member of the genus Guyanancistrus, occurring in rocky streams with flowing water, especially in the vicinity of plunging waters. It is known to coexist with members of the genus Lithoxus in small forested creeks as well as rapids. The species reaches 14.2 cm (5.6 inches) in standard length.

Guyanancistrus brevispinis appears in the aquarium trade, where it is often referred to either as the shortspined wing pleco or by its associated L-number, which is L-041.
