= Jekuthiel Sofer =

18th century Dutch Sephardic scribe

Jekuthiel Sofer was a prolific Jewish Sephardic scribe in Amsterdam in the 18th century.

== Activities ==
Sofer appears to have been commissioned by the Sephardic community in Amsterdam to create liturgical manuscripts in a unique style; he often wrote in letters with tagin, ritual script which can be used in a Sefer Torah or Megillat Taanit. However, in the case of Sofer's Tiengebodenbord decalogue manuscript, Sofer's style of artistic letterforms in Hebrew for artistic enjoyment expanded his reputation.

Sofer's earliest known manuscript, a miniature manuscript in parchment surviving in original binding, slipcase, and decorated endpapers (blue on gold), is today in the University of Pennsylvania Libraries as CAJS Rare Ms. 533; this manuscript is dated 5426 (1765–66) and was commissioned by an Ashkenazic patron; it is the Omer Counting, daily Psalms, and the Blessing of the New Moon. It appeared for sale at the 2019 Marx sale at Sotheby's in New York

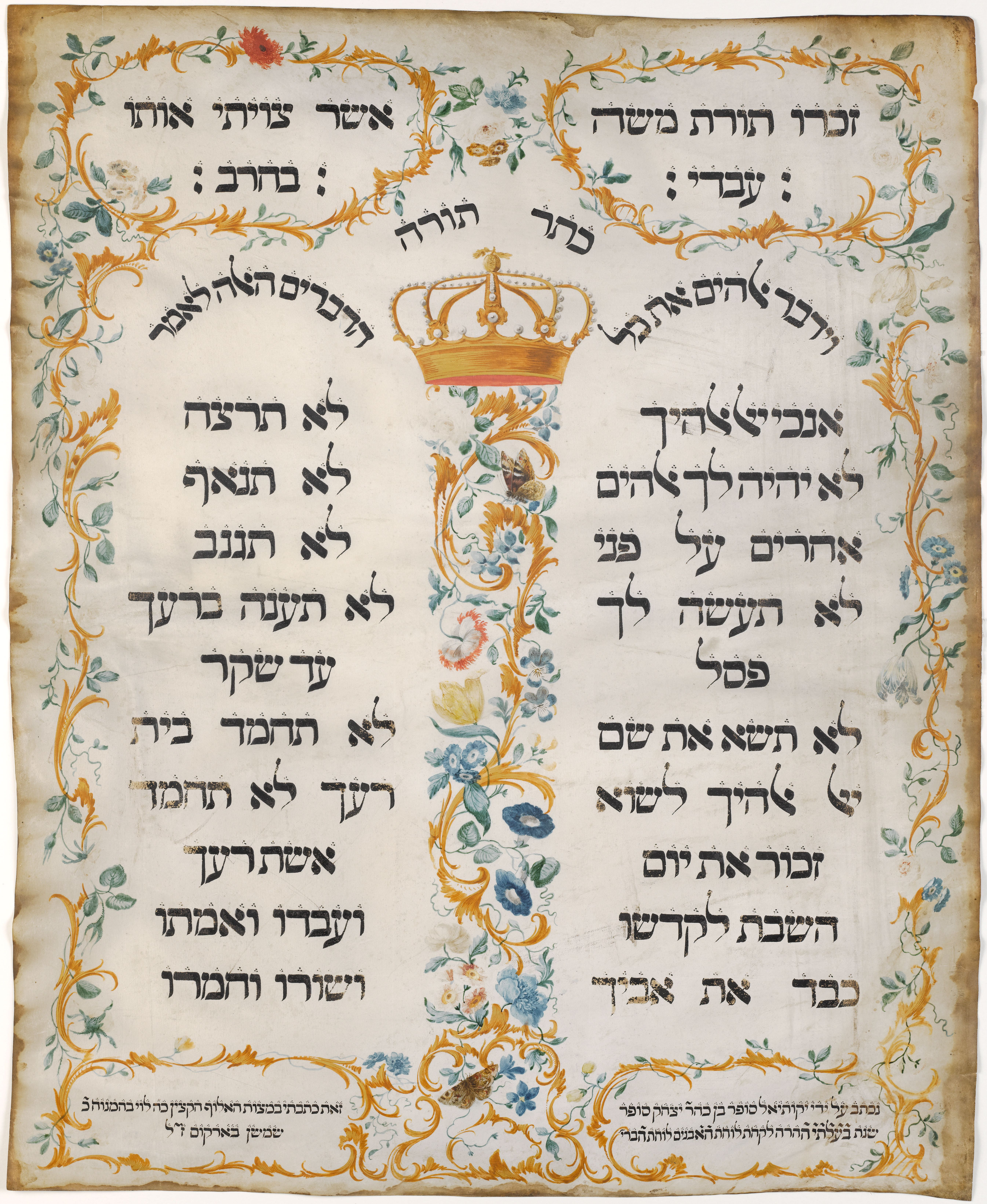
This 1768 parchment by Jekuthiel Sofer emulated 1675 Tablets of the Law at the Esnoga synagogue of Amsterdam
