= Portuguese Synagogue (Amsterdam) =

Orthodox synagogue in Amsterdam, Netherlands

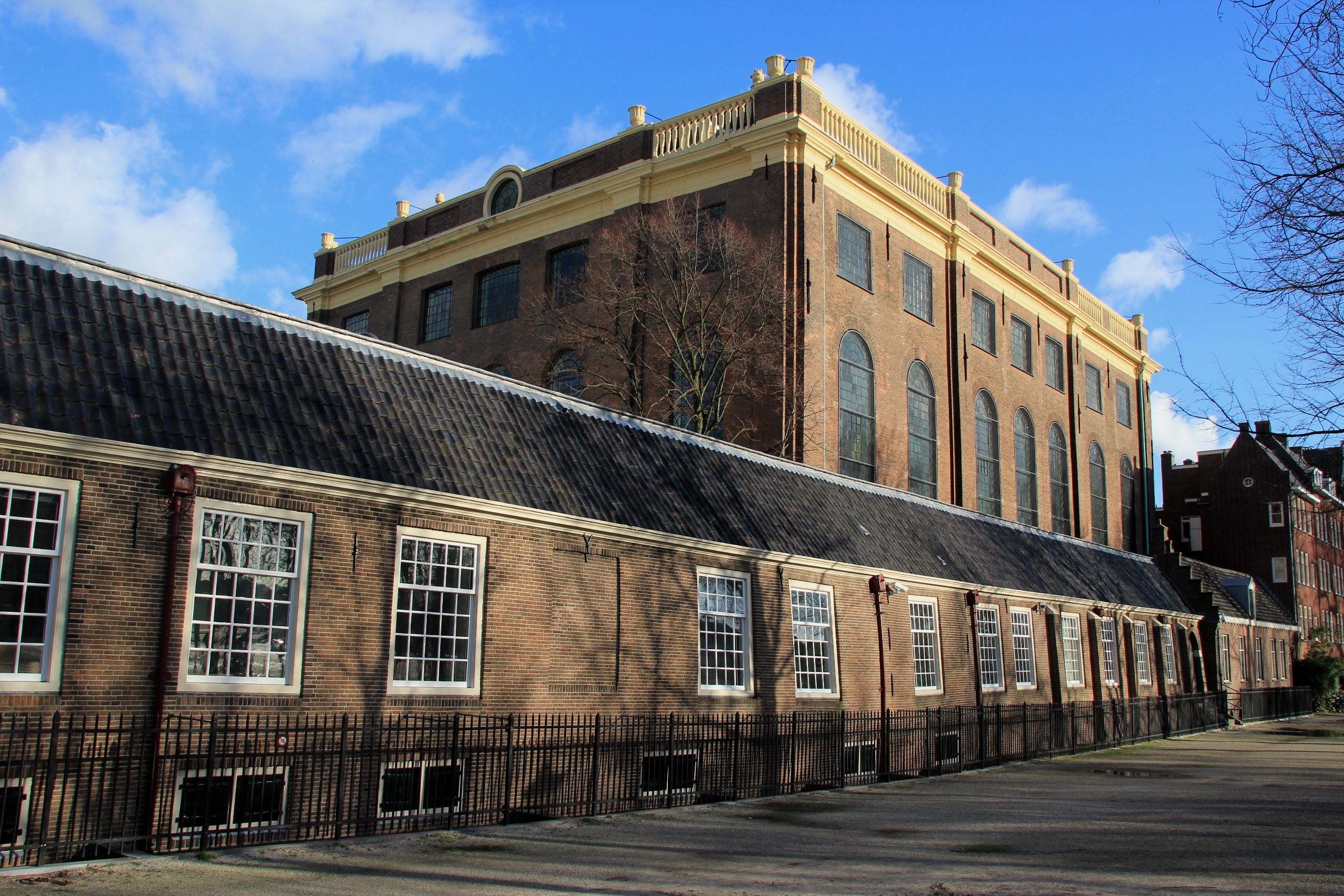
- The synagogue exterior, in 2015

- Location of the synagogue in Central Amsterdam

Religion
- Affiliation: Orthodox Judaism
- Rite: Sephardi
- Ecclesiastical or organisational status: Synagogue
- Status: Active

Location
- Location: Mr. Visserplein 3, Central Amsterdam, Amsterdam, North Holland
- Country: The Netherlands
- Coordinates: 52°22′03″N 4°54′19″E

Architecture
- Architect: Elias Bouwman
- Type: Synagogue architecture
- Style: Baroque
- Groundbreaking: April 17, 1671
- Completed: 1675
- Materials: Brick

Website
- portugesegemeente.nl (in Dutch)

The Portuguese Synagogue, also known as the Esnoga, or Snoge, is an Orthodox Jewish congregation and synagogue, located at Mr. Visserplein 3 in Central Amsterdam, Amsterdam, in the North Holland region of The Netherlands. The synagogue was completed in 1675. Esnoga is the word for synagogue in the traditional Judaeo-Spanish language of Sephardi Jews.

The Amsterdam Sephardic community was one of the largest and richest Jewish communities in Europe during the Dutch Golden Age, and their very large synagogue reflected this. The synagogue is an active place of worship and has been a popular tourist attraction since it was constructed in the late 17th century, when it drew Christian tourists from many countries. The congregation allowed visitation of non-Jews and its opulence was a reflection of the importance of sacred worship to the congregation as well as signaling to all the wealth of the Portuguese Jewish community.

== History ==
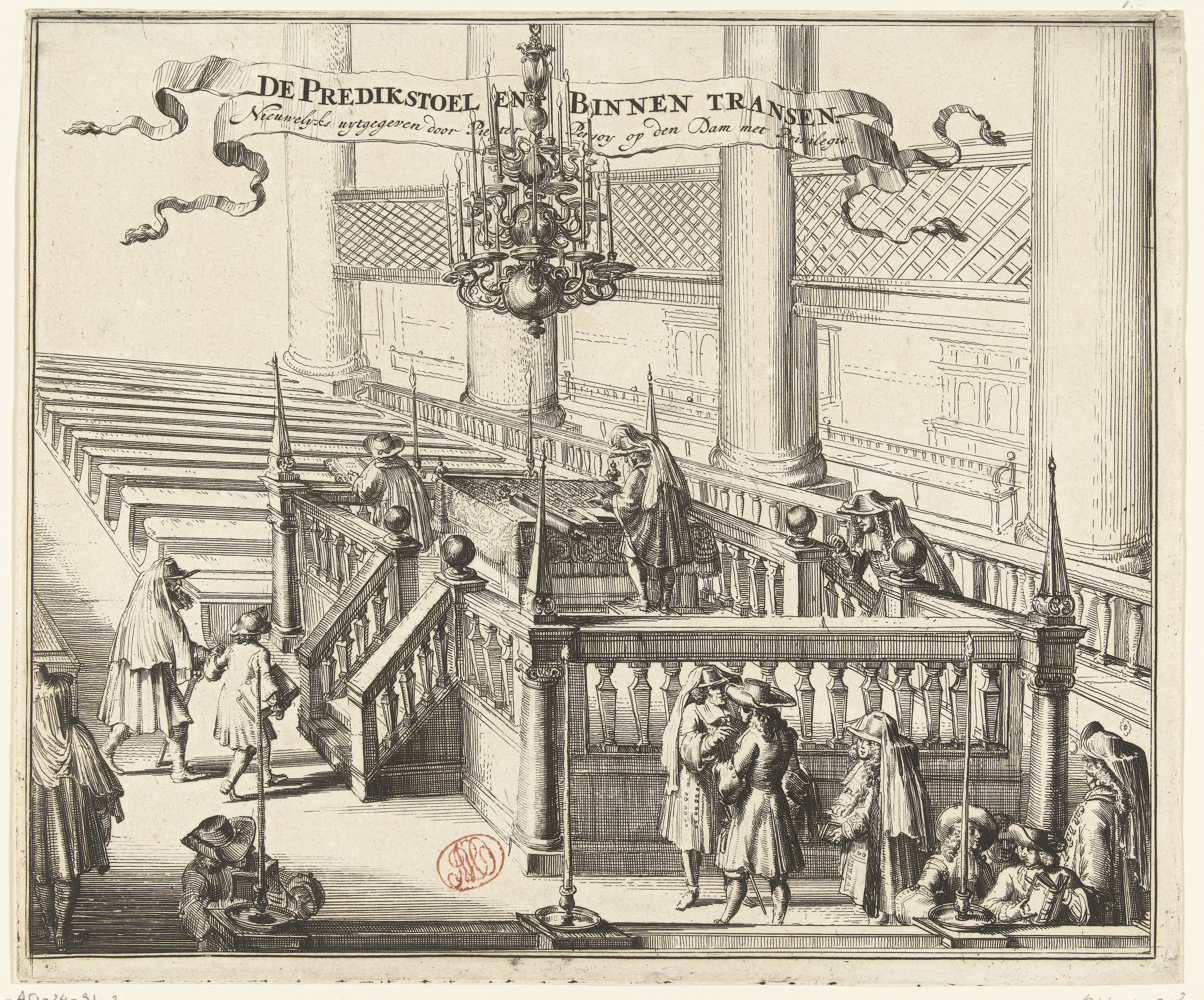
Bima in the Amsterdam Esnoga 1695 by Romeyn de Hooghe

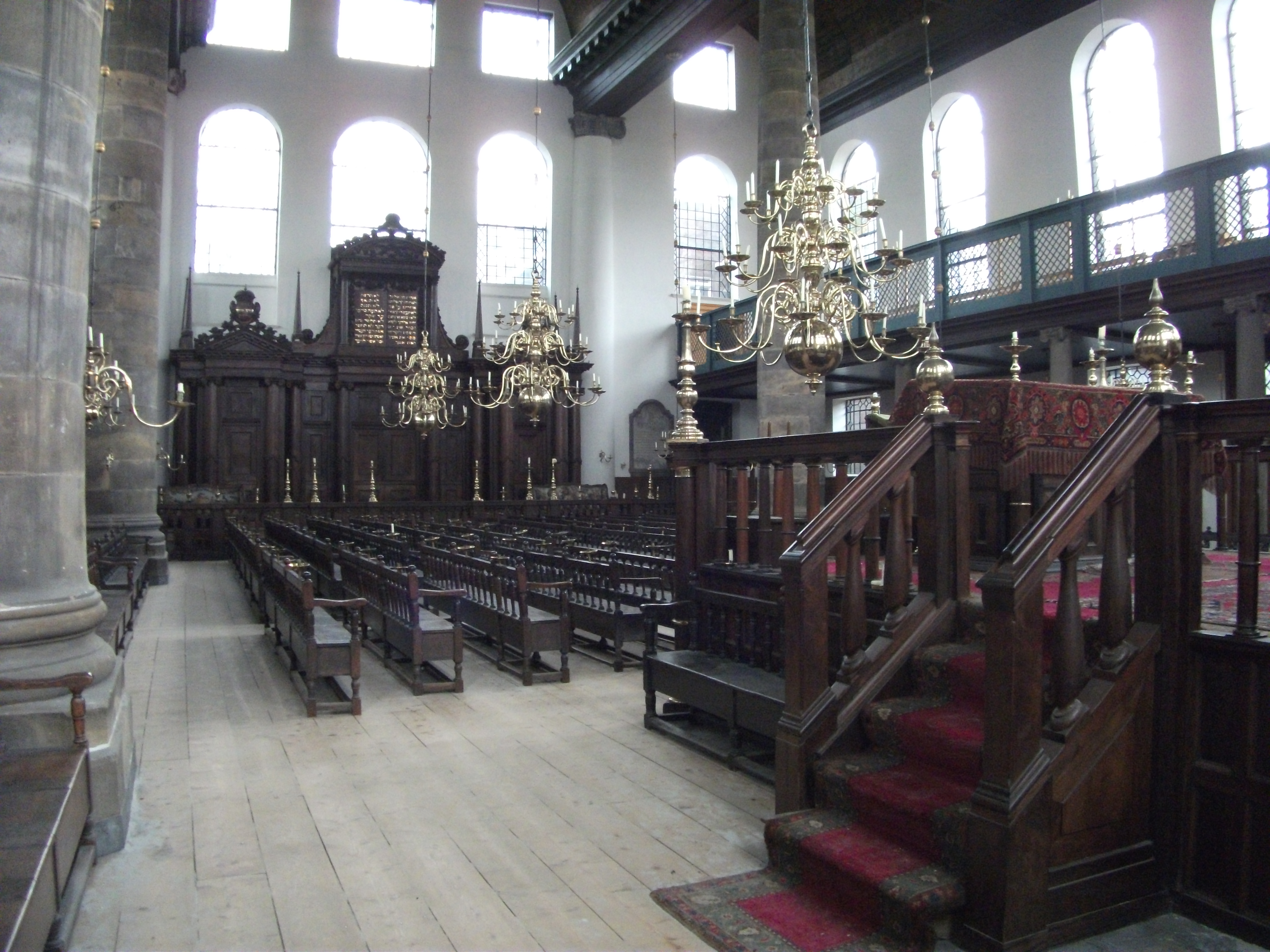
The spacious interior is filled with benches

The Sephardim (Hebrew for "Jews of the Iberian Peninsula") were issued with the Spanish royal Alhambra Decree in 1492, whereby they were given the choice of exile from Spain, or conversion to Catholicism, or failing to do either, execution. Of Spain's estimated 200,000 Jews at that time, around half converted; many by coercion, others because of social and financial pressures preventing their departure, and a few out of genuine religious conviction. They became Spain's Jewish-origin New Christians or conversos (i.e. "converts" to Catholicism).

Of the other half of Spain's Jews who did not convert, and instead chose exile, some sailed south (becoming the North African Sephardim), others went east (becoming the Eastern Sephardim), but most crossed the border west to Portugal.

In Portugal, Jewish life was interrupted only a few years later, when there too they were issued with the Portuguese decree against the Jews in 1496. While in theory, the Jews now in Portugal who chose not convert to Catholicism also had the option to be expelled (or executed) by 1497, the Portuguese king, in practice blocked Portugal's ports of exit, and subsequently reasoned that those who stayed behind agreed to become Christians by default. Thus the Jews in Portugal were forced to convert to Catholicism in 1496 after the decree and, all but a few who did manage to flee, became Portugal's Jewish-origin New Christians or conversos.

For the next few centuries, the Inquisition in Spain and Portugal continued to investigate the conversos and their descendants on suspicions that they continued to practice Judaism in secret. Many in fact did continue to practice Judaism behind closed doors while publicly professing to be Catholics; in Spanish and Portuguese these were called marranos.

The persecutions and trials by the inquisition against conversos lasted well into the late 1700s. The legal distinction between so-called Old Christians and New Christians was maintained for centuries, with a person's genealogy always on record.

Both those crypto-Jews, who actively maintained Jewish practices in secret, and also some sincere conversos or New Christians, who had converted fully to Catholicism, were at times hounded, persecuted and executed on charges of practicing Judaism. This was often a pretext for the confiscation of their property. Many of them wished to have freedom of religion again and to be free from this institutionalized antisemitism. Amsterdam, then one of the greatest cities in the world, offered both of these things. In this historical context, a substantial migration of conversos from the Iberian Peninsula to Amsterdam took place from the 1600s to the early 1800s. Once in Amsterdam, many returned to Judaism openly and publicly. They called themselves Portuguese Jews, even those who came directly from Spain. They wanted to avoid being identified with Spain, which was at war with the Dutch Republic at the time during the Eighty Years' War. This branch of Judaism is also known as the Western Sephardim.

The Sephardic Jews in Amsterdam were known as the "first modern Jews" because they were the first to distinguish between religious and secular spheres of their individual and collective lives. Their religious life was focused primarily on the synagogue, the religious calendar of Jewish life, and an eagerness to provide a Jewish education for their children. The early 17th Portuguese Jewish community of "the nation" (naçao) formed three separate congregations, which merged into one, the Talmud Torah. In 1670 they purchased a site in Amsterdam and planned the construction of a large synagogue, which was inaugurated in 1675. The construction of the Portuguese Synagogue, the Esnoga, was a heavy burden on the congregation as a whole.

=== World War II ===
During the Nazi campaign to systematically murder Jews in the Holocaust, the facility was slated to become a deportation center for Jews, but Leo Palache and a team of volunteers managed to dissuade the Nazis from this plan. Instead, the building concealed Jewish ritual items for deported Jews in the sanctuary ceiling and attic floor. The World War II diary of executive director Salomon Coutinho was discovered in Amsterdam and details the synagogue's works and efforts to protect the building during the war.

=== Recent history ===
In November 2021 Yitzhak Melamed, an expert on Baruch Spinoza, requested to visit the synagogue to film Melamed conducting research in the library’s archives.

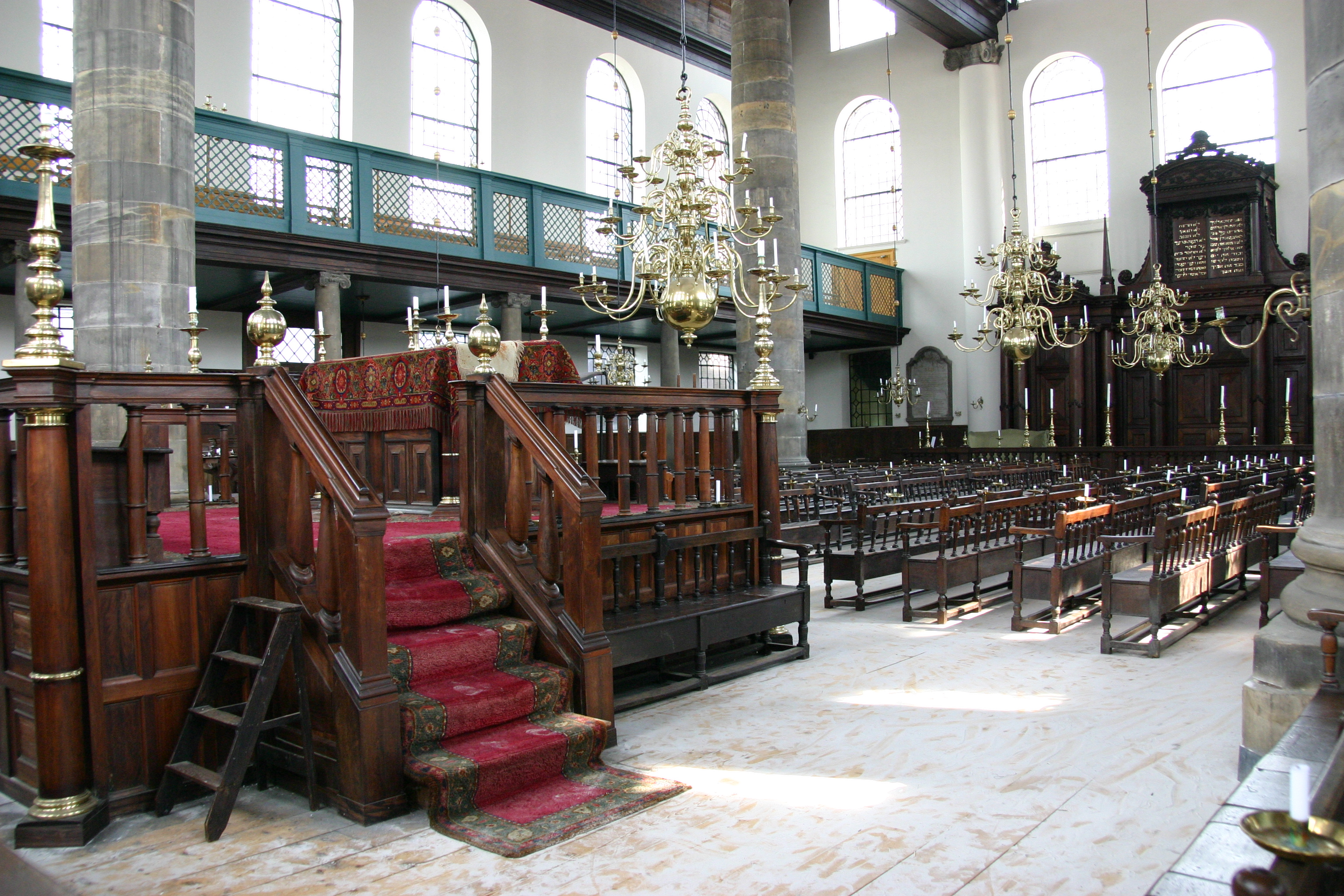
Bemah at left, ark at right

Serfaty banned Melamed from visiting the community’s synagogue and library due to his research of the “heretic.” Responding to Melamed in a letter, Serfaty not only forbade Melamed to film in the building but declared him to be a persona non-grata, essentially even denying Melamed to participate in prayer services in the Esnoga.

"The chachamim and parnassim of Kahal Kados Torah excommunicated Spinoza and his writings with the severest possible ban, a ban that remains in force and cannot be rescinded. You have devoted your life to the study of Spinoza’s banned works and the development of his ideas,” Serfaty writes.

"Your request to visit our complex and create a film about this Epicouros [heretic]… is incompatible with our centuries-old halachic, historic and ethical tradition and an unacceptable assault on our identity and heritage... “I therefore deny your request and declare you persona non grata in the Portuguese Synagogue complex."

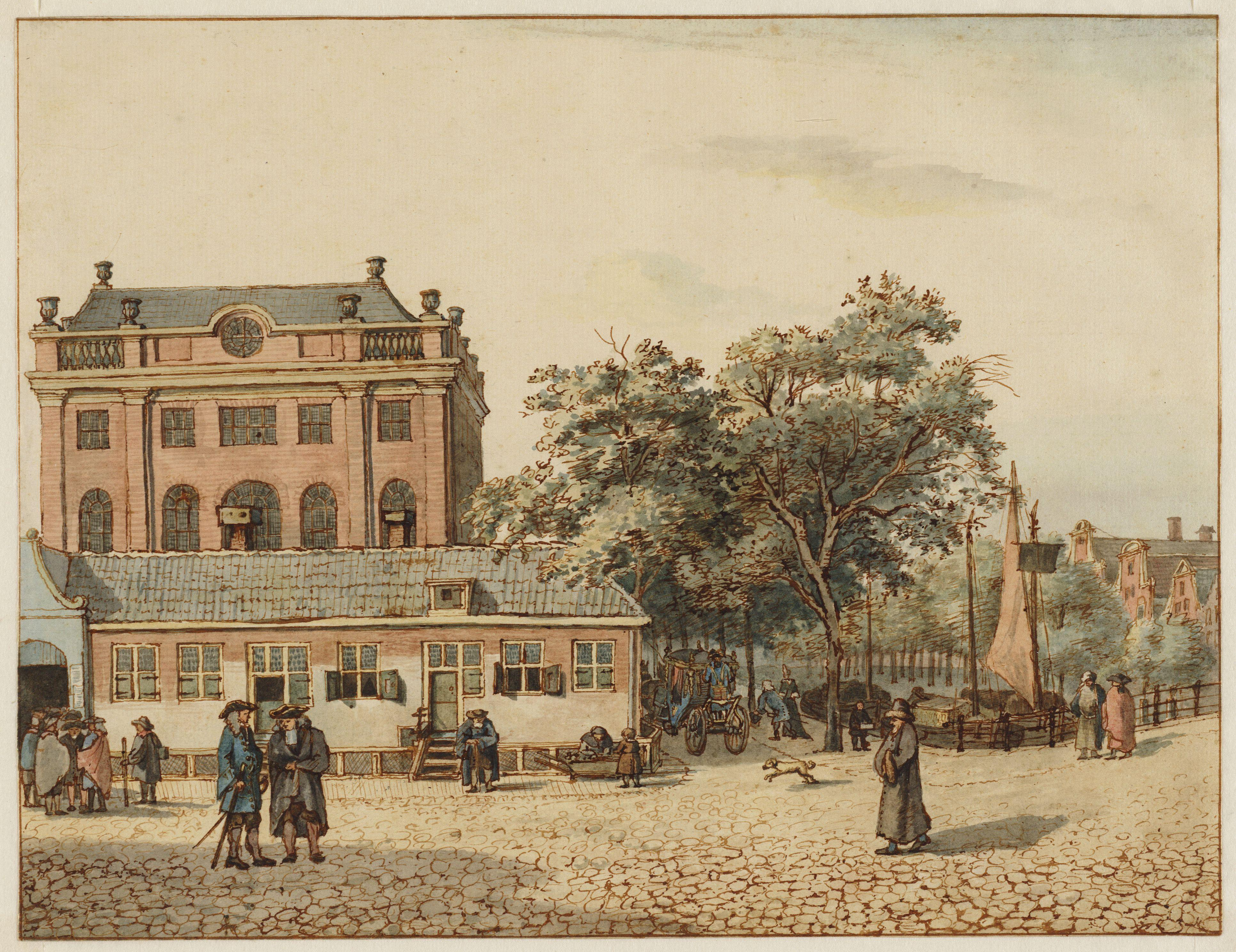
Watercolour, Gerrit Lamberts, 1816

Pinchas Toledano, the Hakham-Emeritus (Chief Rabbi-Emeritus) of the Esnoga and the former Chief Rabbi of the Beth Din in The Netherlands supported Serfaty. In a letter to Melamed, Toledano writes: "I hereby inform you that ten professors from all over the world, including Israel, came to a symposium on December 6, 2015. The Spinoza case has been widely discussed. Myself, as the Chacham of the congregation, gave a lecture on the subject and the conclusion was that the cherem [ban] imposed on him by our previous rabbis must be maintained. In light of the above, there is no opportunity to discuss Spinoza with you in our complex.”

On November 30, 2021 the board of the Esnoga, sent a letter to its members. In the letter, they stated that both Serfaty and Toledano do not agree to retract their words. However, the board did not fire them. On December 2 the board of the Esnoga sent a second letter to its members, with attached a letter to Melamed with an invitation to Melamed do research and film in the Esnoga complex.

== Architecture ==
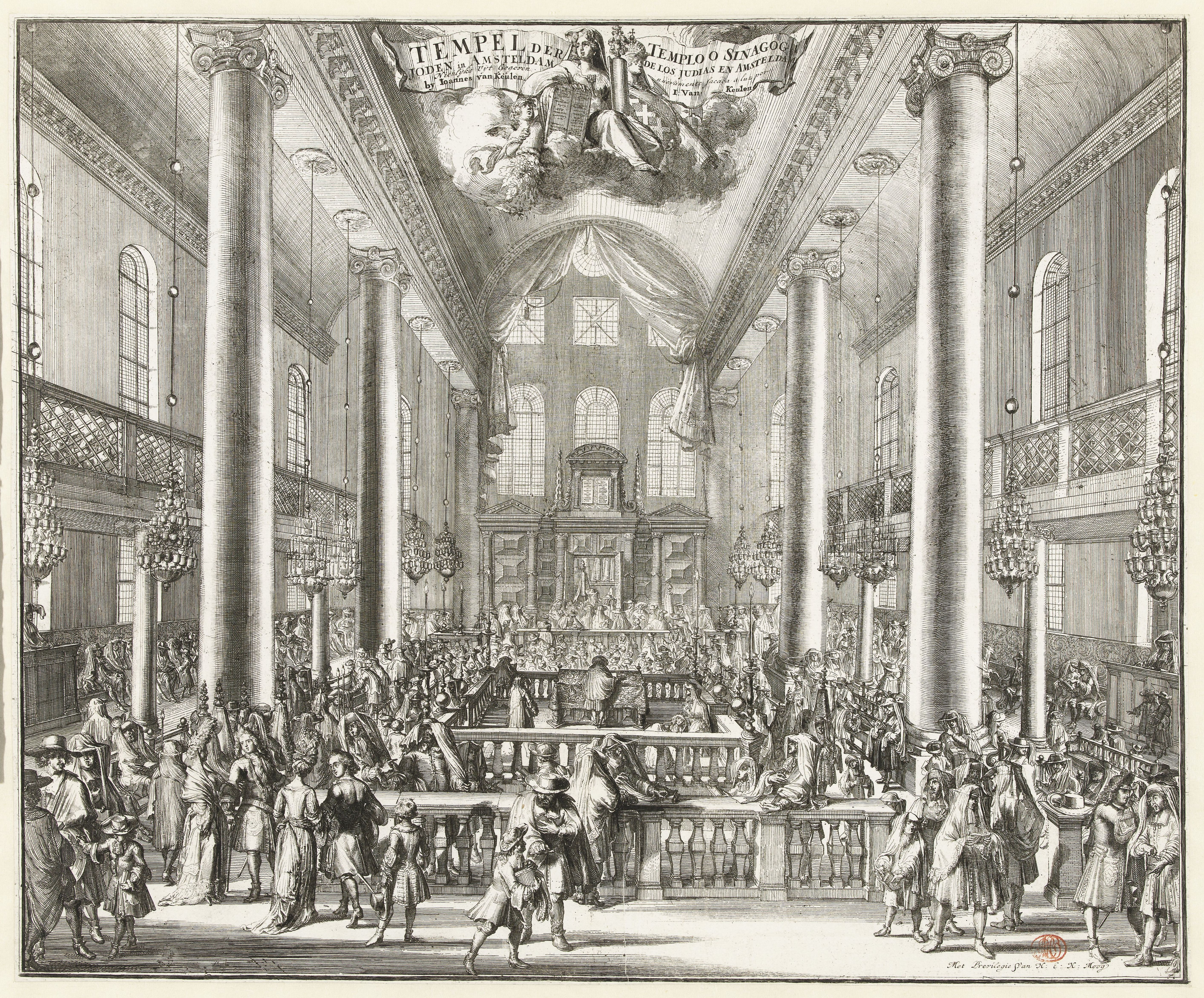
Interior of the Portuguese Synagogue in 1695 by Romeyn de Hooghe

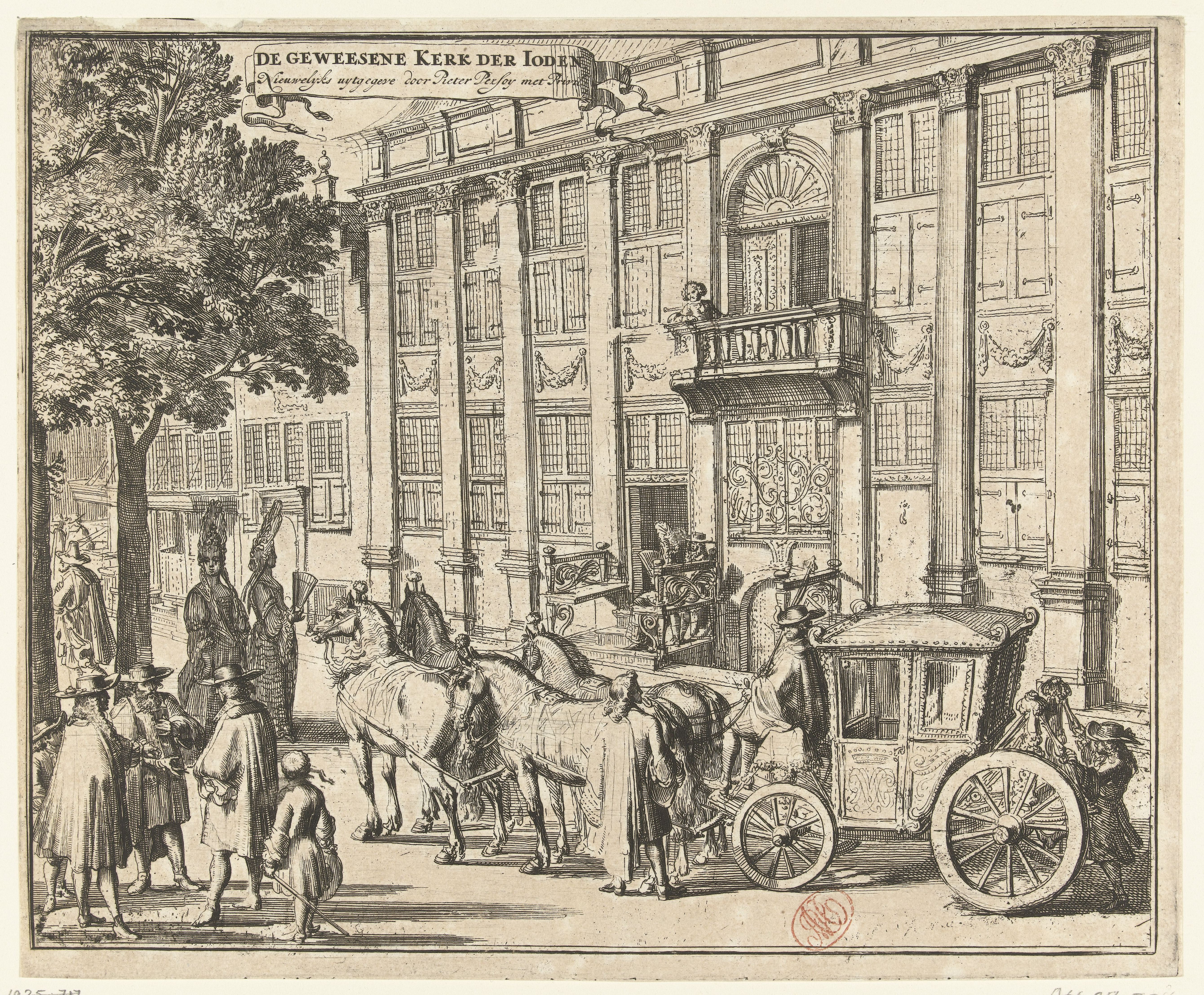
Exterior of the Portuguese synagogue in Amsterdam, ca. 1695, showing the social context of the wealthy community. 1695 by Romeyn de Hooghe

On December 12, 1670, the Sephardic Jewish community of Amsterdam acquired the site to build a synagogue and construction work began on April 17, 1671, under the architect Elias Bouman. On August 2, 1675, the Esnoga was completed and opened with great ceremony. The design is based on the plans for King Solomon's temple.

The inscription above the entrance is from Psalm 5:8: "In the abundance of Thy loving kindness will I come into Thy house". The sign also contains "1672", the year the building was intended to be completed, and "Aboab", the name of the chief rabbi who initiated the construction project.

The building is free-standing and rests on wooden piles; the foundation vaults can be viewed by boat from the canal water underneath the synagogue. The entrance to the main synagogue is off a small courtyard enclosed by low buildings housing the winter synagogue, offices and archives, homes of various officials, the rabbinate, a mortuary, and noted Ets Hayim library. During the 1955–1959 renovation, the former Ets Hayim seminary auditorium was redesigned as a winter synagogue; central heating and electric lighting were added. The benches were taken from a synagogue originally built in 1639 and the Torah ark dates from 1744. The ark is made from a solid piece of jacaranda wood from Brazil. The main sanctuary does not have an internal electric system; two chandeliers that hold 1000 candles are lit when necessary.

=== Interior ===
The interior of the synagogue is a single, very high rectangular space retaining its original wooden benches. The floor was covered with fine sand, in the old Dutch tradition, to absorb dust, moisture and dirt from shoes and to muffle the noise. Only five synagogues in the world had a sand floor, and this was the only one with such a floor surviving outside the Caribbean.

The interior of the Portuguese Synagogue is of the longitudinal Iberian-Sephardic type. The ark is situated in the south-east corner of the building and faces Jerusalem. On the other side of the room, opposite of the ark, is a tebah.

The women's gallery is supported by twelve stone columns, each which represents one of the Twelve Tribes of Israel. In addition to these columns, there are four large brass chandeliers that hold a total of a thousand candles. All of the candles are lit in the synagogue during worship services, shining out through the 72 windows.

=== Depictions in art ===
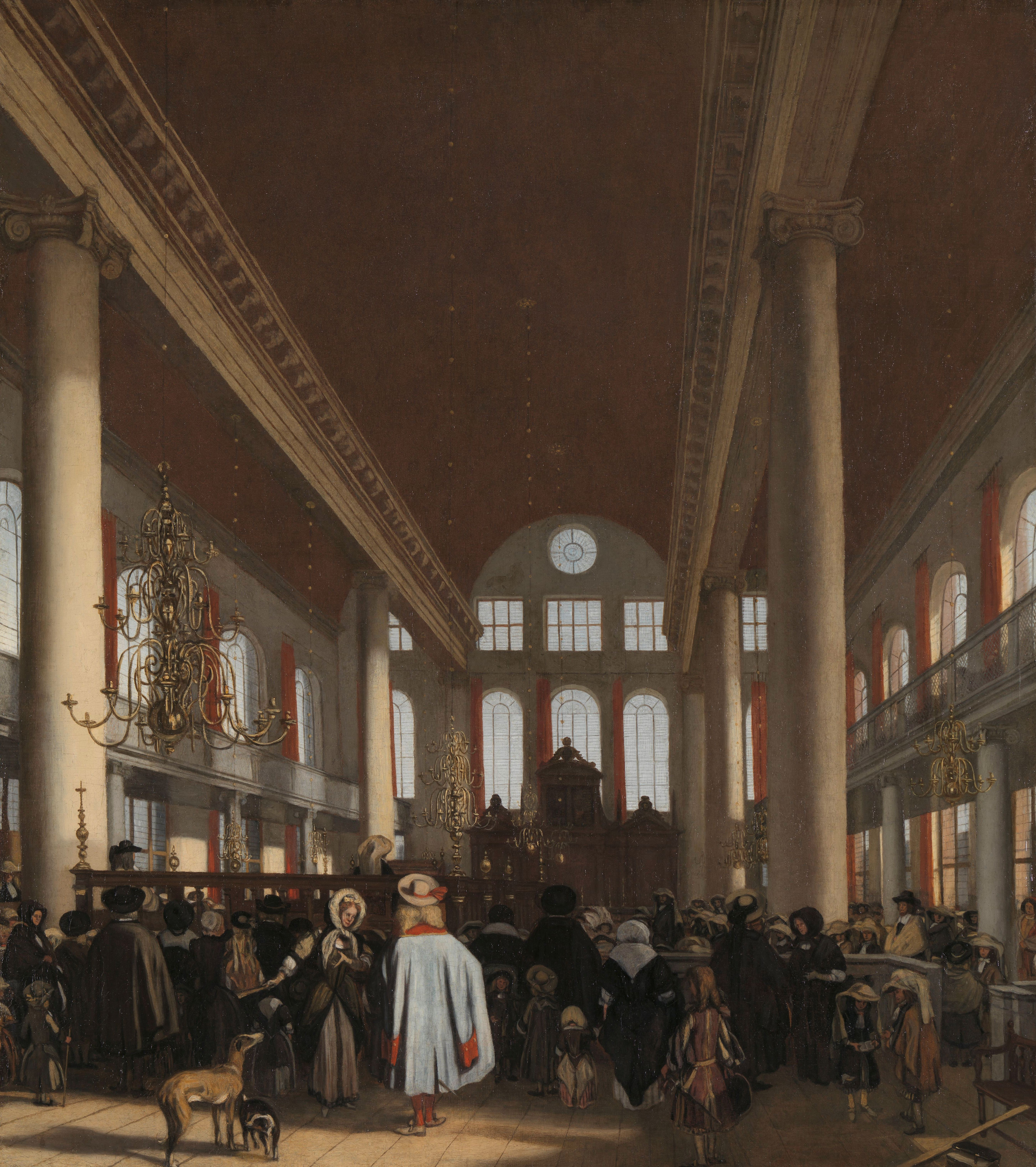
Painting of the interior of the Esnoga by Emanuel de Witte (c. 1680), Rijksmuseum, Amsterdam

In the seventeenth century, Western European art saw a shift from exclusively pejorative depictions of Jews and Jewish culture to one that was more realistic and observational. Two Dutch artists, engraver Romeyn de Hooghe and painter Emmanuel de Witte produced multiple images of the Portuguese Synagogue. De Hooghe produced multiple engravings of the interior and exterior of the synagogue, as well as exteriors of wealthy Portuguese Jewish merchants residences, and scenes of ordinary cultural life in the Jewish community. De Witte painted three scenes of the interior of the synagogue.

Emanuel de Witte produced three paintings of the Esnoga. One is in the Rijksmuseum in Amsterdam, another in the Israel Museum, Jerusalem. There was one in the Kaiser Friedrich Museum in Berlin, apparently no longer extant, but it was photographed prior to its 1945 disappearance. It is unclear for whom these paintings were made, but de Witte painted many works of houses of worship in Amsterdam, not necessarily from direct observation. Both de Witt and de Hooghe produced works that show the synagogue with worshipers and visitors, not merely as architectural depictions.

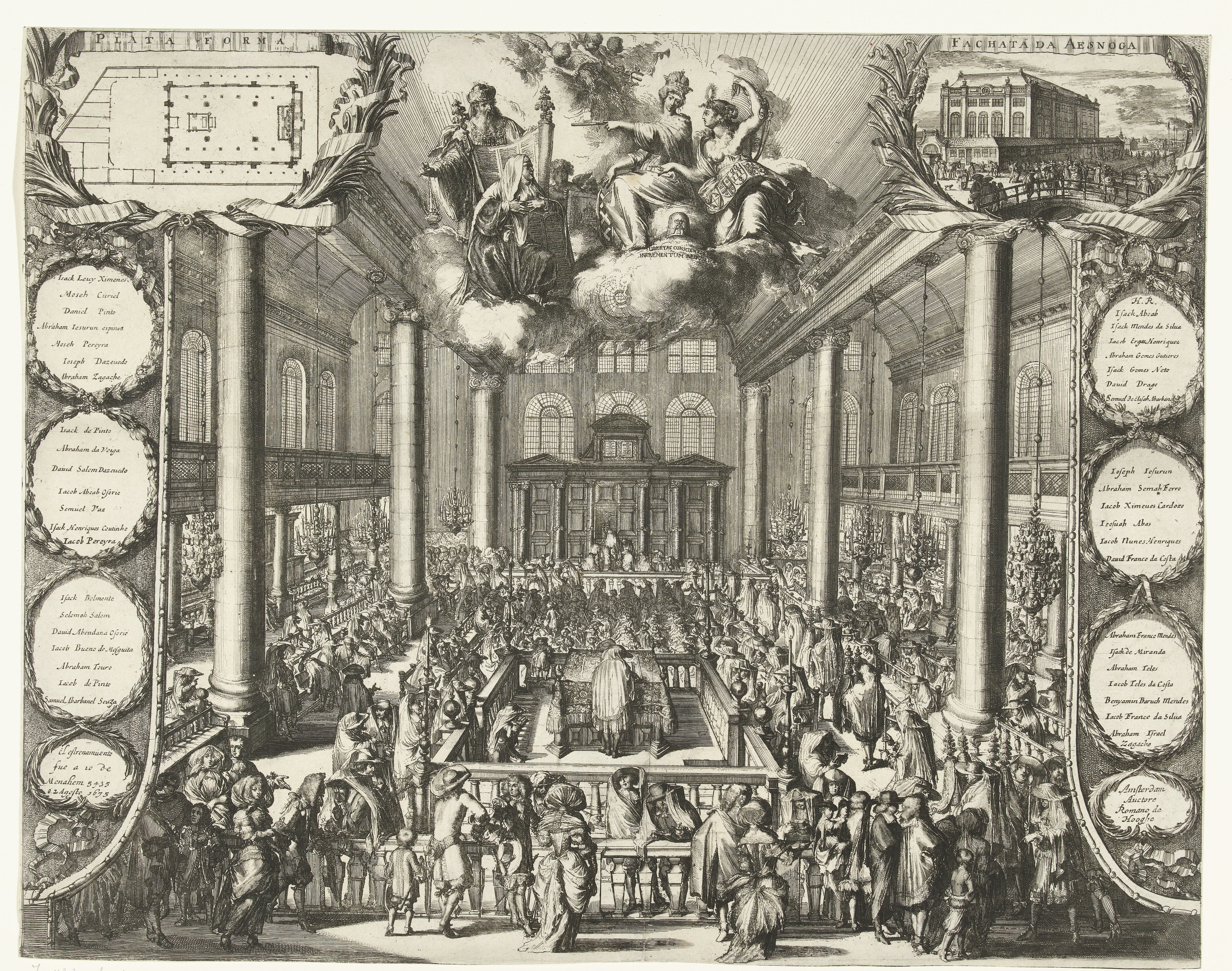
View of the dedication of the Esnoga, 2 August 1675. Romeyn de Hooghe

De Hooghe engraving of the inauguration of the synagogue brings together many elements. The names of major contributors to the creation of the synagogue are listed in medallions on either side of the engraving along with some other information. The medallions on the engraving list the following names: top left, Isack Leuy Ximenez, Moseh Curiel, Daniel Pinto, Abraham Iesurun espino[s?]a, Moseh Pereyra, Ioseph Dazeuedo, Abraham Zagache; middle left: Isack de Pinto, Abraham da Veiga, Dauid Salom Dazeudo, Iacob Aboab Osorio, Semuel Vaz, Isack Henriques Coutinho, Iacob Pereyra; bottom left: Isack Belmonte, Selomoh Salom, Dauid Abendana Osorio, Iacob Bueno de Mesguita, Abraham Touro, Iacob de Pinto, Samuel Abarbanel Seuza. Medallions on the right are headed “H.R.”, top right: Isack Aboab, Isack Mendes da Silva, Iacob Ergas Henriquez, Abraham Gomes Gutieres, Isack Gomes Neto, Dauid Drago, Semuel de Elijah Abarbanel; middle right: Ioseph Iesurum, Abraham Semah Ferro, Iacob Ximenez Cardozo, Ieosuah Abas, Iacob Nunes Henriques, Dauid Franco da Costa; lower right: Abraham Franco Mendes, Isack de Miranda, Abraham Teles, Iacob Teles da Costa, Benyamin Baruch Mendes, Iacob Franco da Silua, Abraham Israel Zagache; bottom right [signed] Amsterdam, Auctore, Romano de Hooghe.

The description in Dutch by the Rijksmuseum (Note: Description in Dutch of the image in the Rijksmuseum on Wikimedia Commons. Identificatie: Titel(s): Interieur van de Portugese Synagoge te Amsterdam tijdens de inwijding, 1675. Objecttype: prent nieuwsprent. Objectnummer: RP-P-OB-67.743. A. Catalogusreferentie: Aantal staten bekend-1 of 2(4). Opmerking: Andere staat met vermelding dat de prent te koop is bij De Hooghe in de Kalverstraat. En twee latere staten.FMH 2574-AAtlas van Stolk 2618. Hollstein Dutch 117. KAN 157. Omschrijving: Gezicht op het interieur van de Portugese Synagoge te Amsterdam tijdens de inwijding op 2 augustus 1675. In het midden, op de naar het oosten gerichte teba, de chazan. Rechts worden de torarollen, gedragen door mannen en afgewisseld door mannen met een fakkel of een kaars, in een stoet naar de heilige ark (aron hakodesj of hechal) gedragen. Boven in het midden geven de Amsterdamse Stedenmaagd en de personificatie van Vrijheid van Geweten een Joodse priester met gebedsrol en een knielende vrouw met wetstafelen de vrijheid om hun godsdienst uit te oefenen. Links hiervan een plattegrond van de tempel, rechts een gezicht op de buitenkant. Aan weerszijden medaillons met de namen van regenten van de synagoge, leden van de bouwcommissie en personen die tijdens de inwijding ceremonies uitvoerden. Hierbij een apart tekstblad met tekst in 3 kolommen in het Nederlands, Portugees en Frans en 5 verzen in het Nederlands, Portugees, Hebreeuws, Latijn en Frans.) of De Hooghe's elaborate image contains considerable information about the iconography and text, here translated to English.

“View of the interior of the Portuguese Synagogue in Amsterdam during the dedication on 2 August 1675. In the center, on the east-pointing teba [raised platform] is the chazan [the cantor]. On the right are the Torah scrolls, carried by men and un-rolled by men with a torch and a candle, carried in a procession to the holy ark. Above, in the middle, the Maid of Amsterdam and the personification of Freedom of Conscience give a Jewish priest [rabbi] with a prayer roll and a kneeling woman with the tables of the law freedom to practice their religion. [Upper] Left of there is a map of the temple, and on the [upper] right a view of the outside. On the opposite sides are medallions with the names of regents of the synagogue, members of the building commission and people who performed during the dedication ceremonies. Along with this, and separate, is a sheet of text in three columns in Dutch, Portuguese and French, and five verses in Dutch, Portuguese, Hebrew, Latin and French.”

== Ets Haim (Tree of Life) Library ==
The Portuguese Synagogue has one of the oldest Jewish libraries in the world, filled with original and rare texts and constantly called upon for academic and rabbinical research. It was founded in 1616 and has been housed in the historical complex of the Portuguese Jewish community of Amsterdam since 1675. In 1889 the private library of the then librarian David Montezinos was donated to Ets Haim, and the library has been known since then as Ets Haim/Livraria Montezinos. In the 1940s, the library's contents were shipped to Germany by the Nazis, but the books were returned to the Netherlands after the war; the books were sent to Israel in 1979 and returned to Amsterdam in 2000. In 2003, the library, totalling 500 manuscripts and 30,000 printed works, was added by UNESCO to the Memory of the World International Register, which recognises documentary heritage of global importance. In 2014, in partnership with the National Library of Israel, a majority of the manuscripts were digitized, making the catalog available online and free.

== Image gallery ==
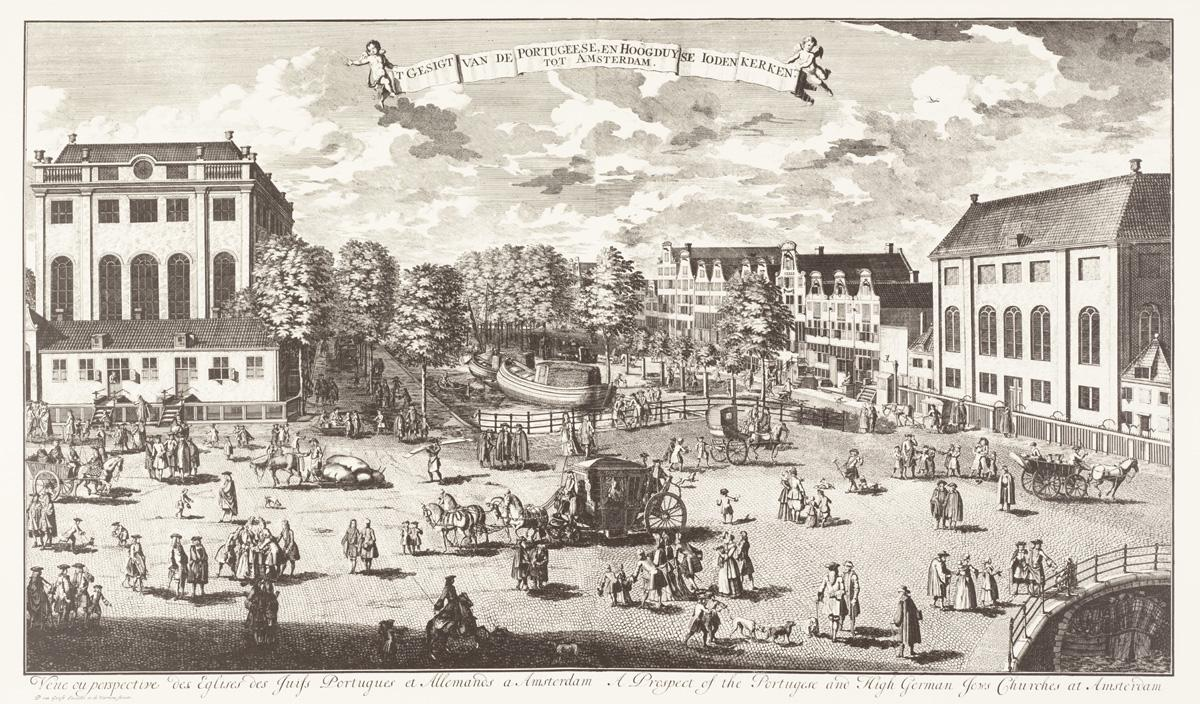
General view with the synagogue at left, 18th century

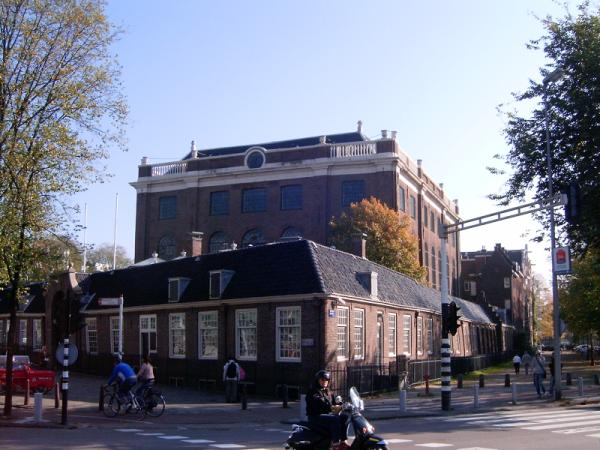
Exterior, side view

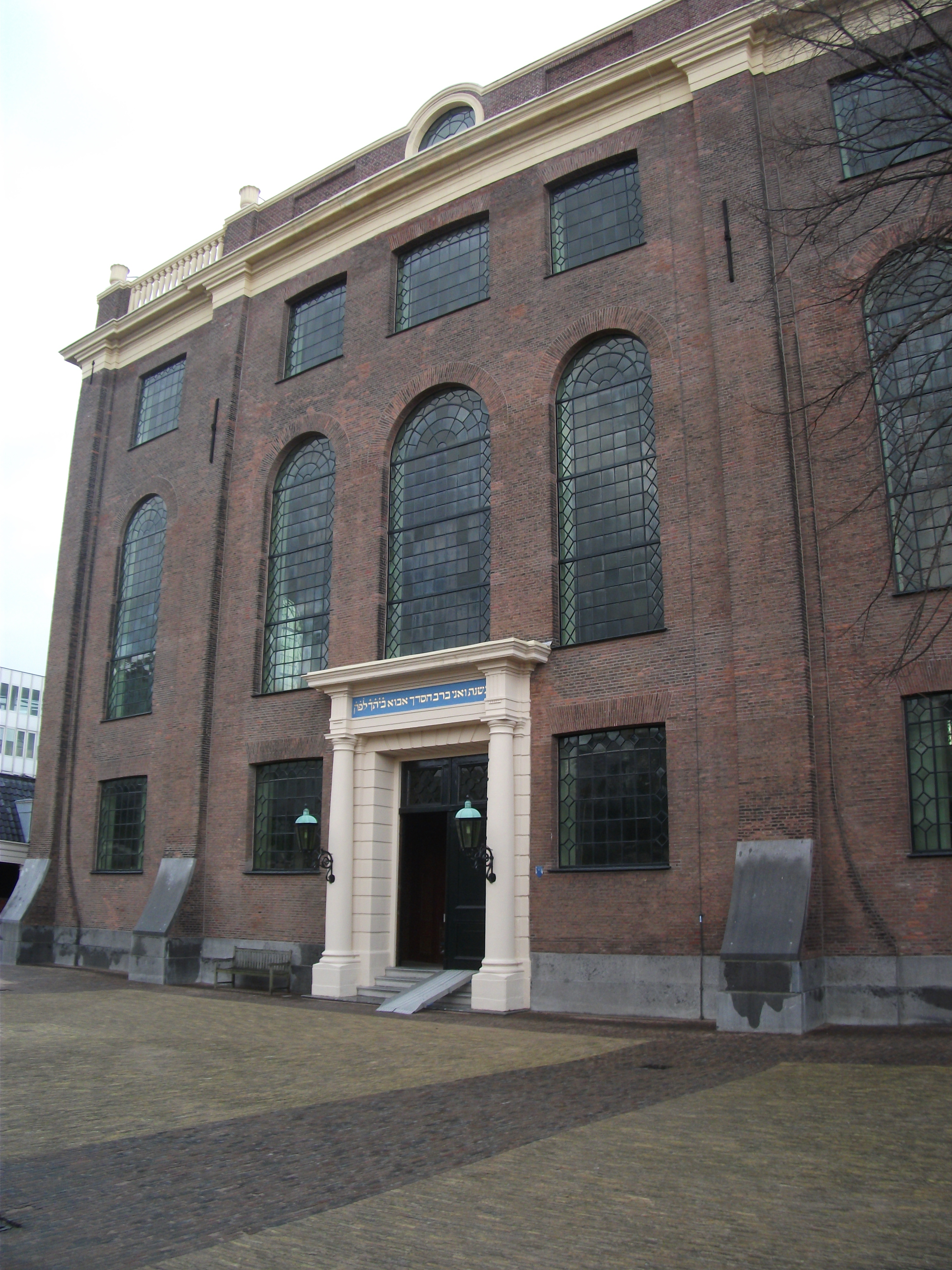
The exterior of the Esnoga

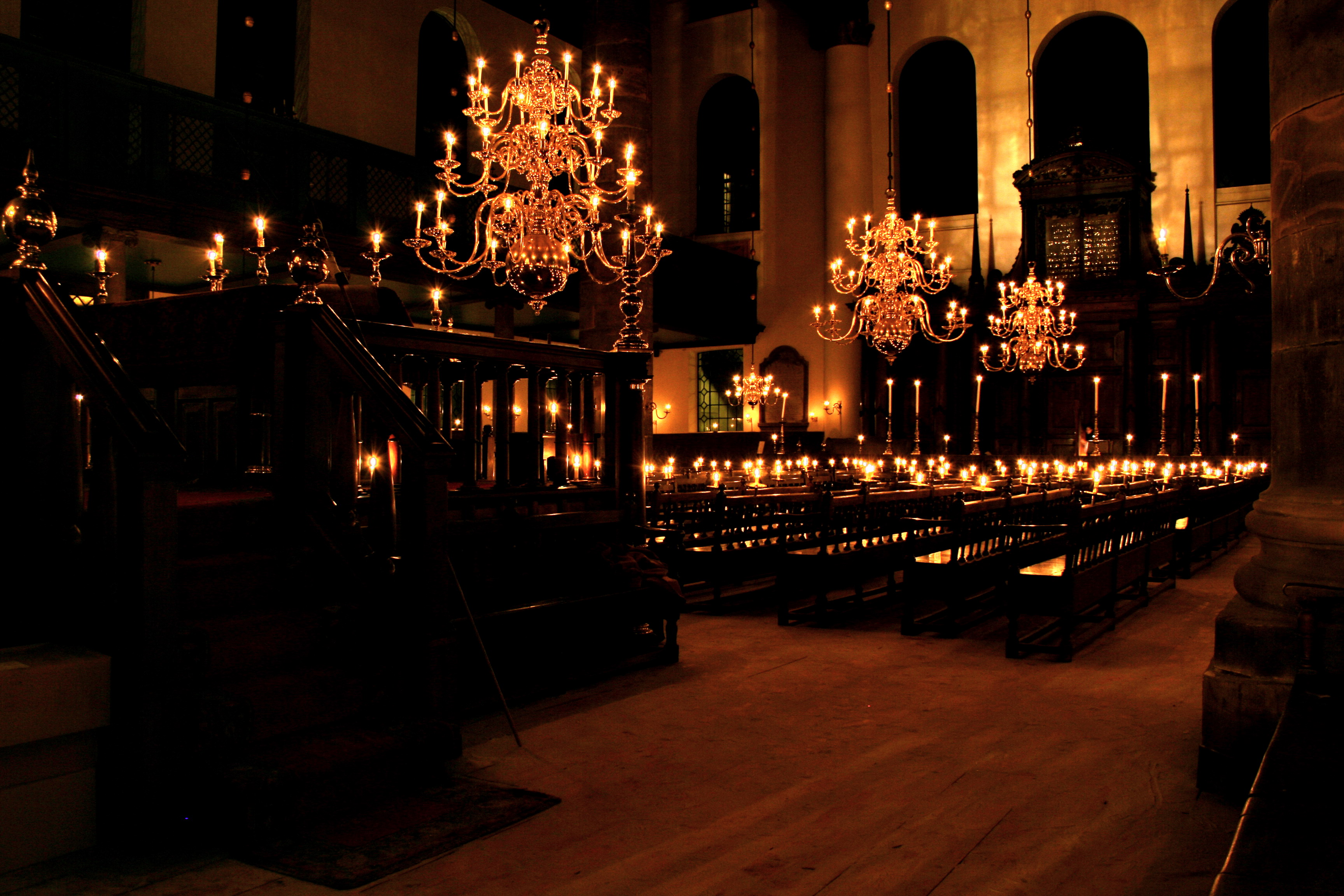
Interior, lit up with candles

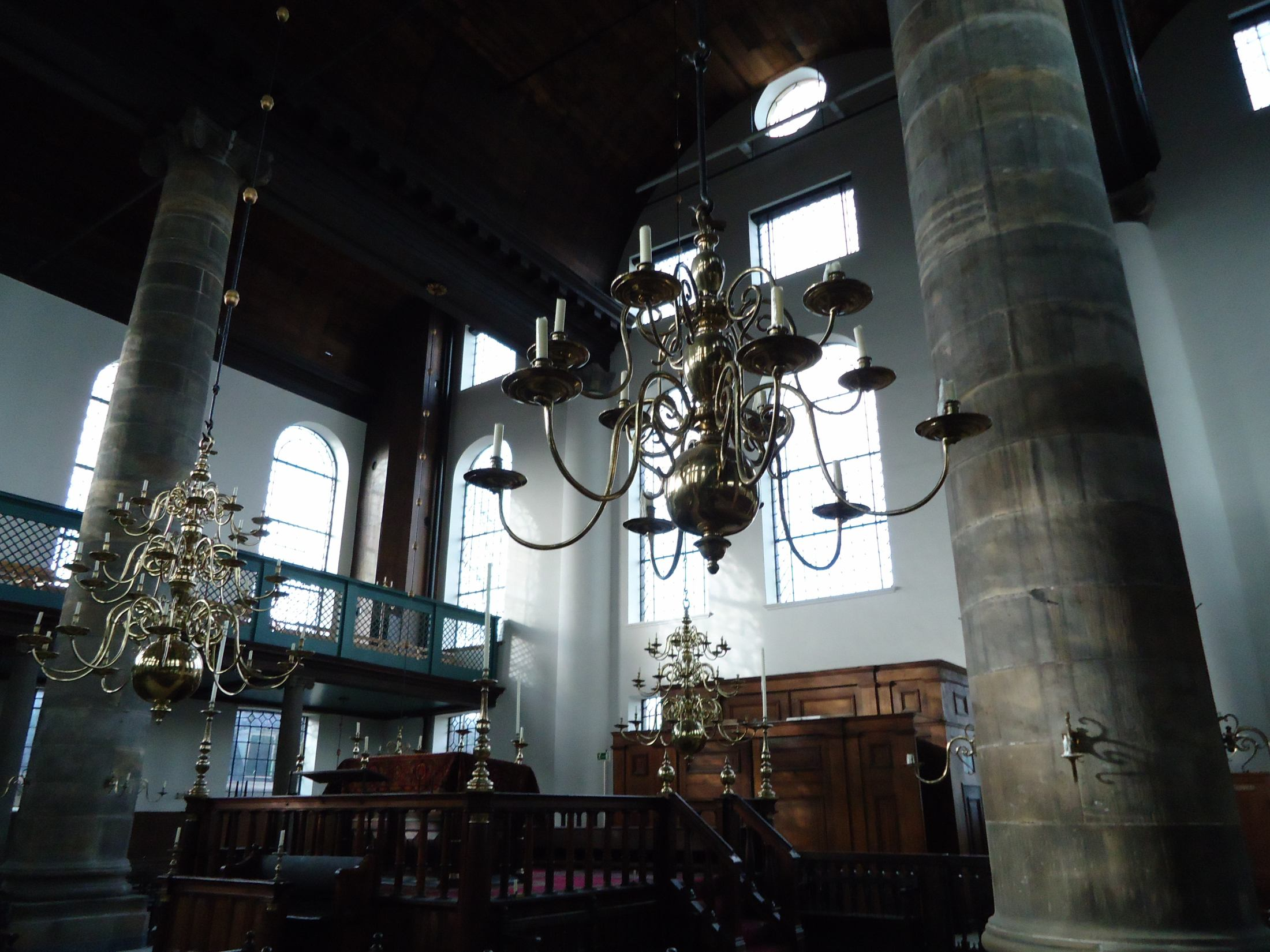
Looking up

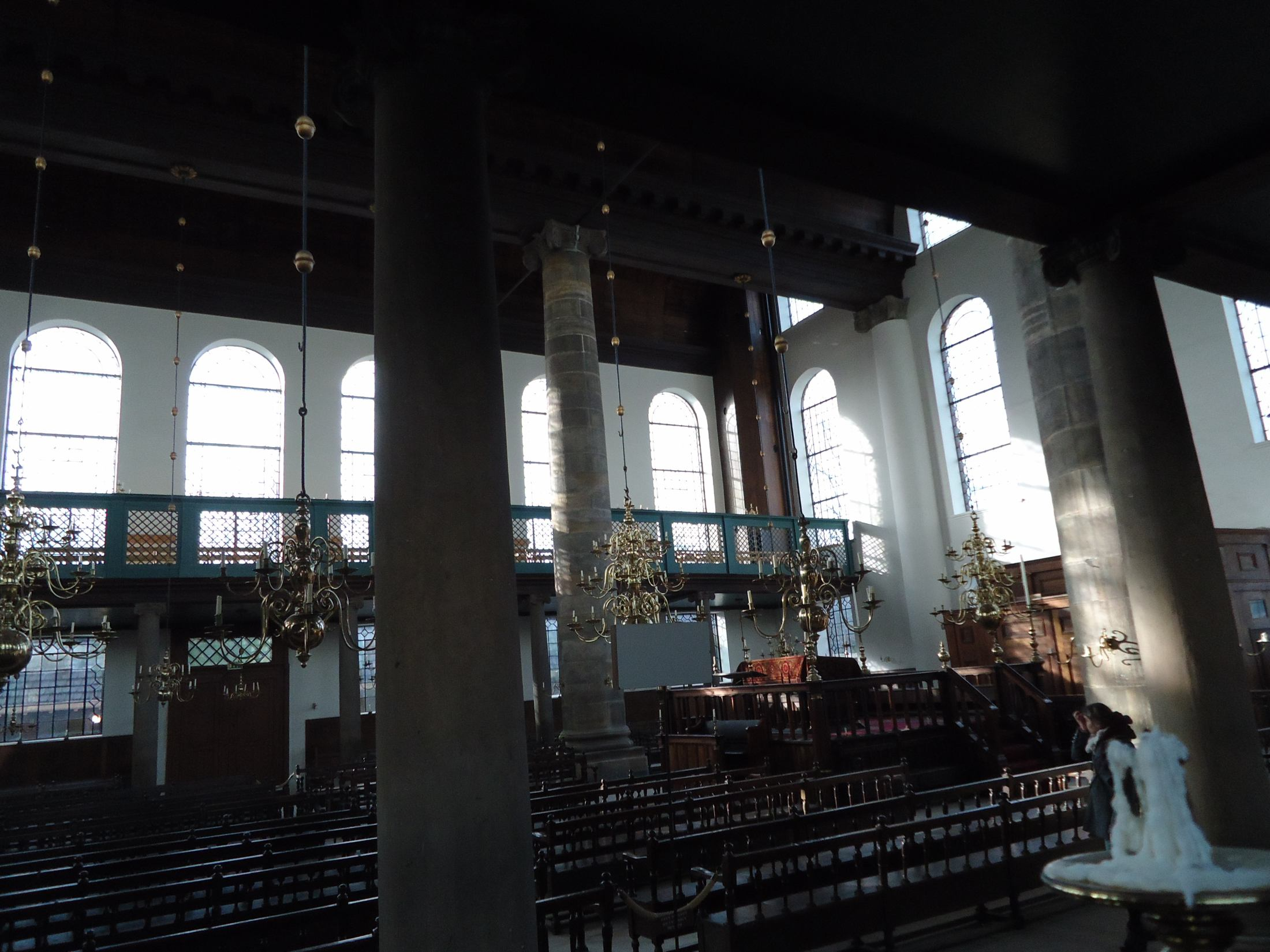
Windows with natural light

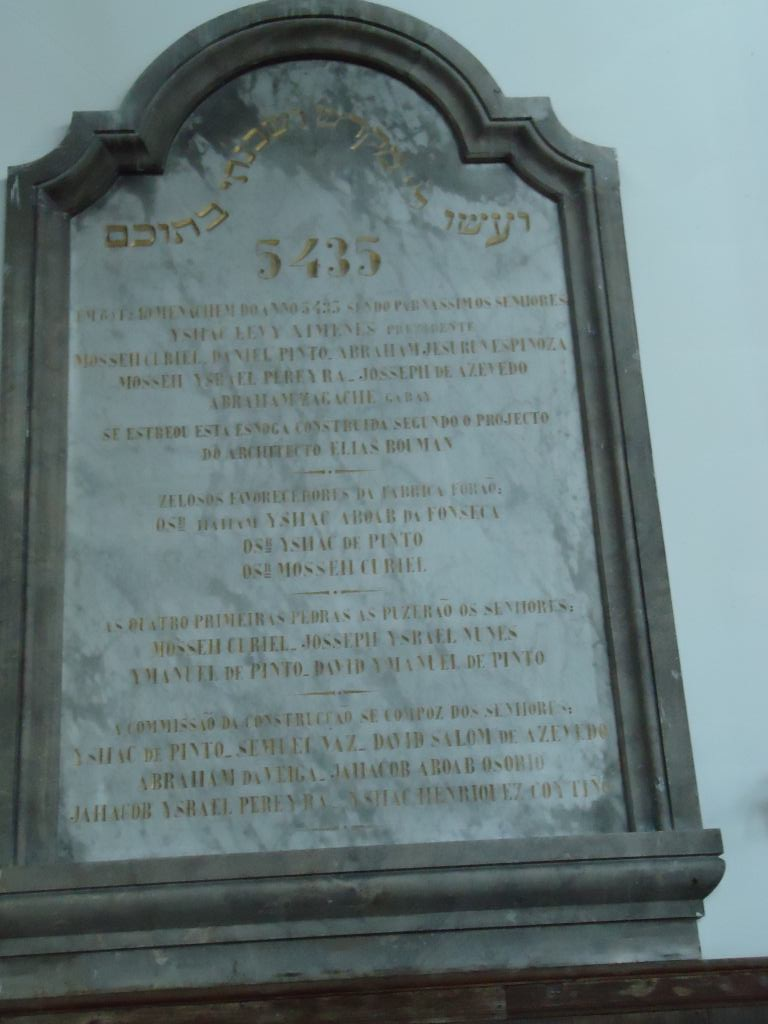
Foundation memorial stone

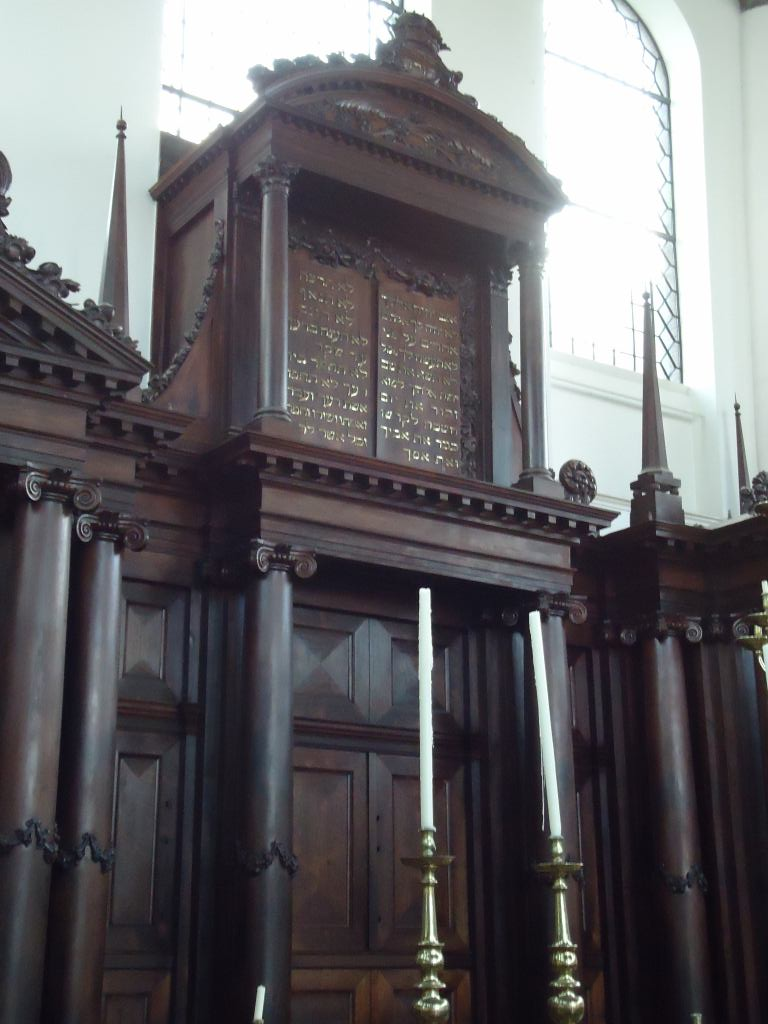
Ark (hekhál)

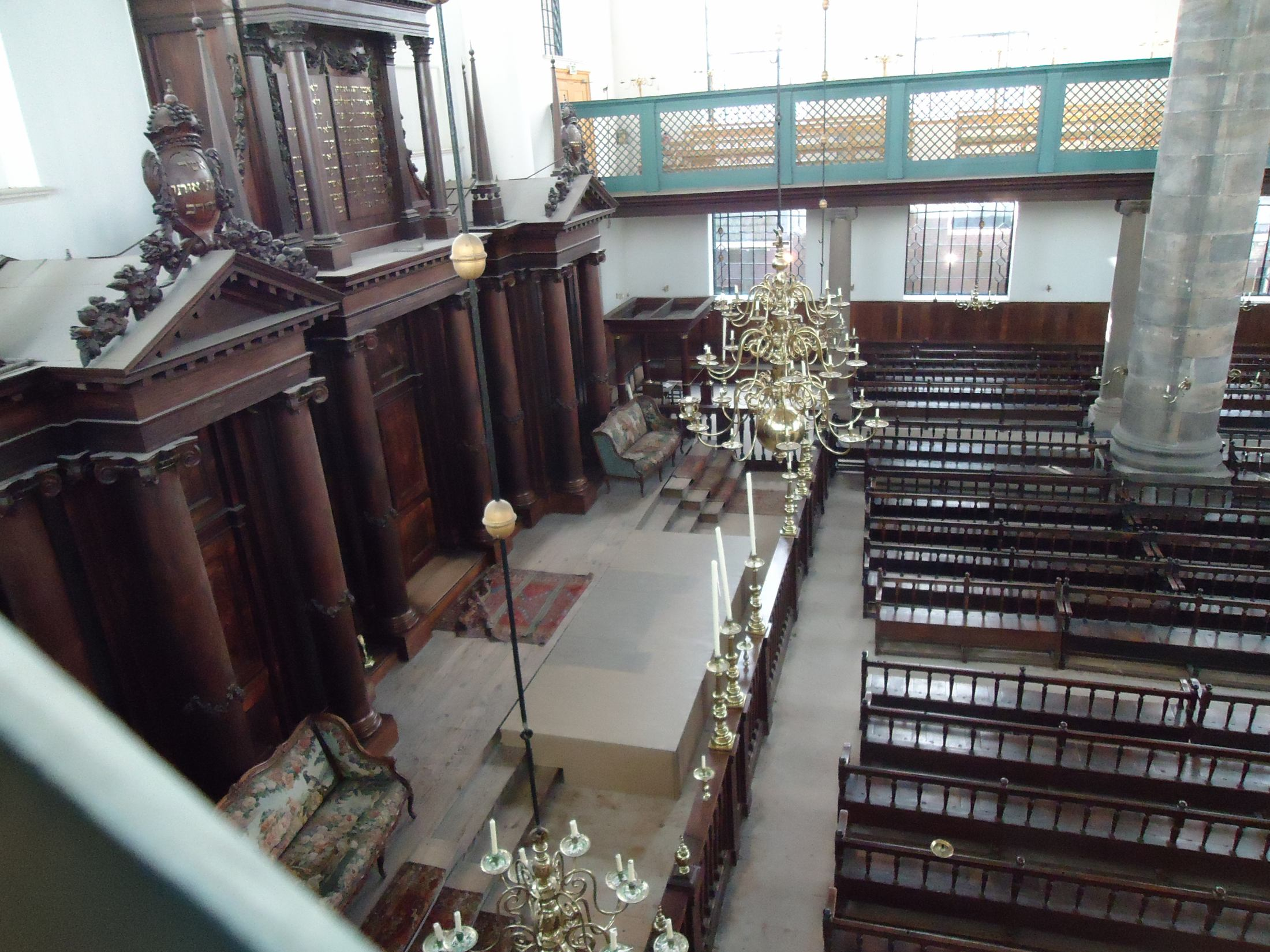
Ark from upstairs

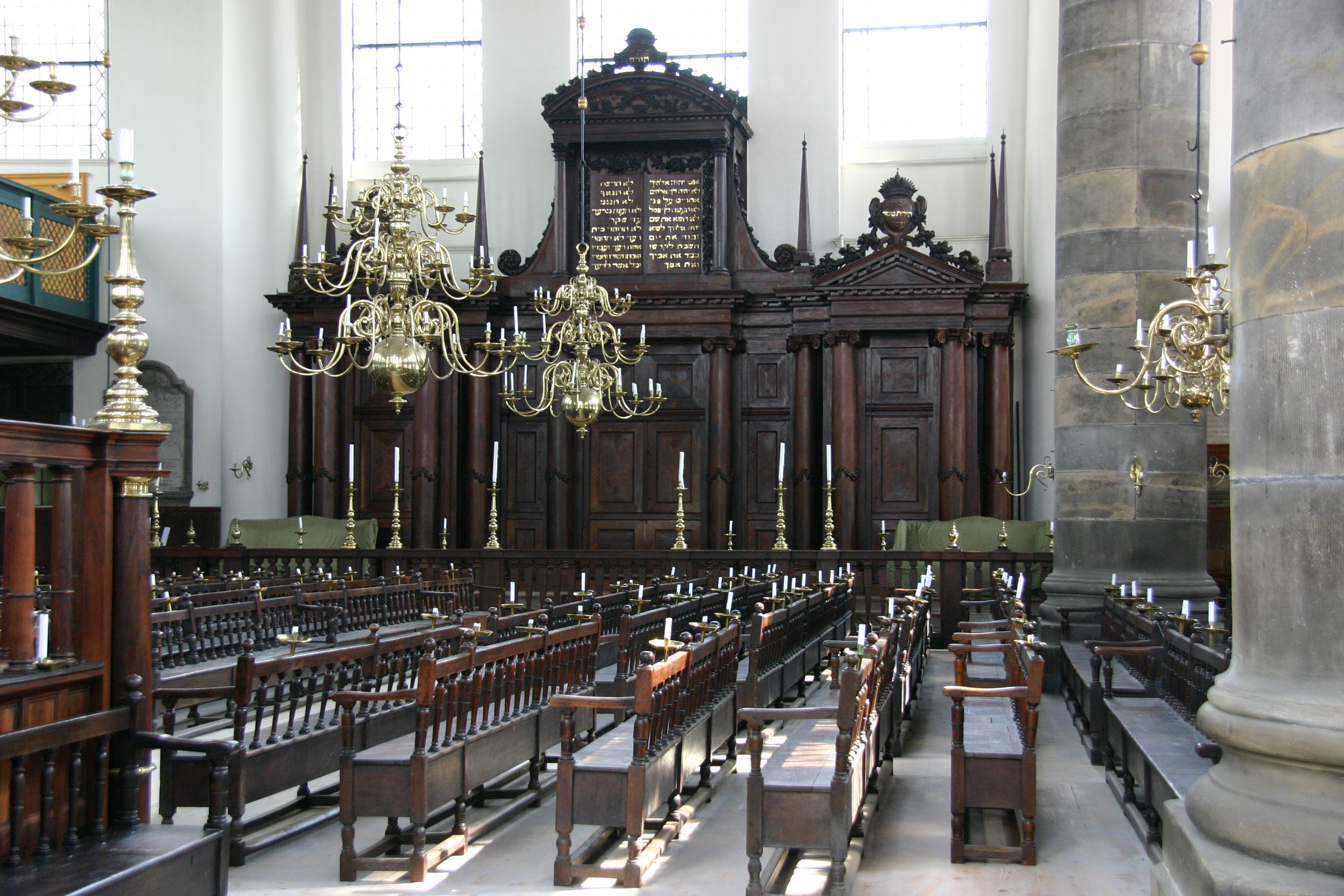
Ark

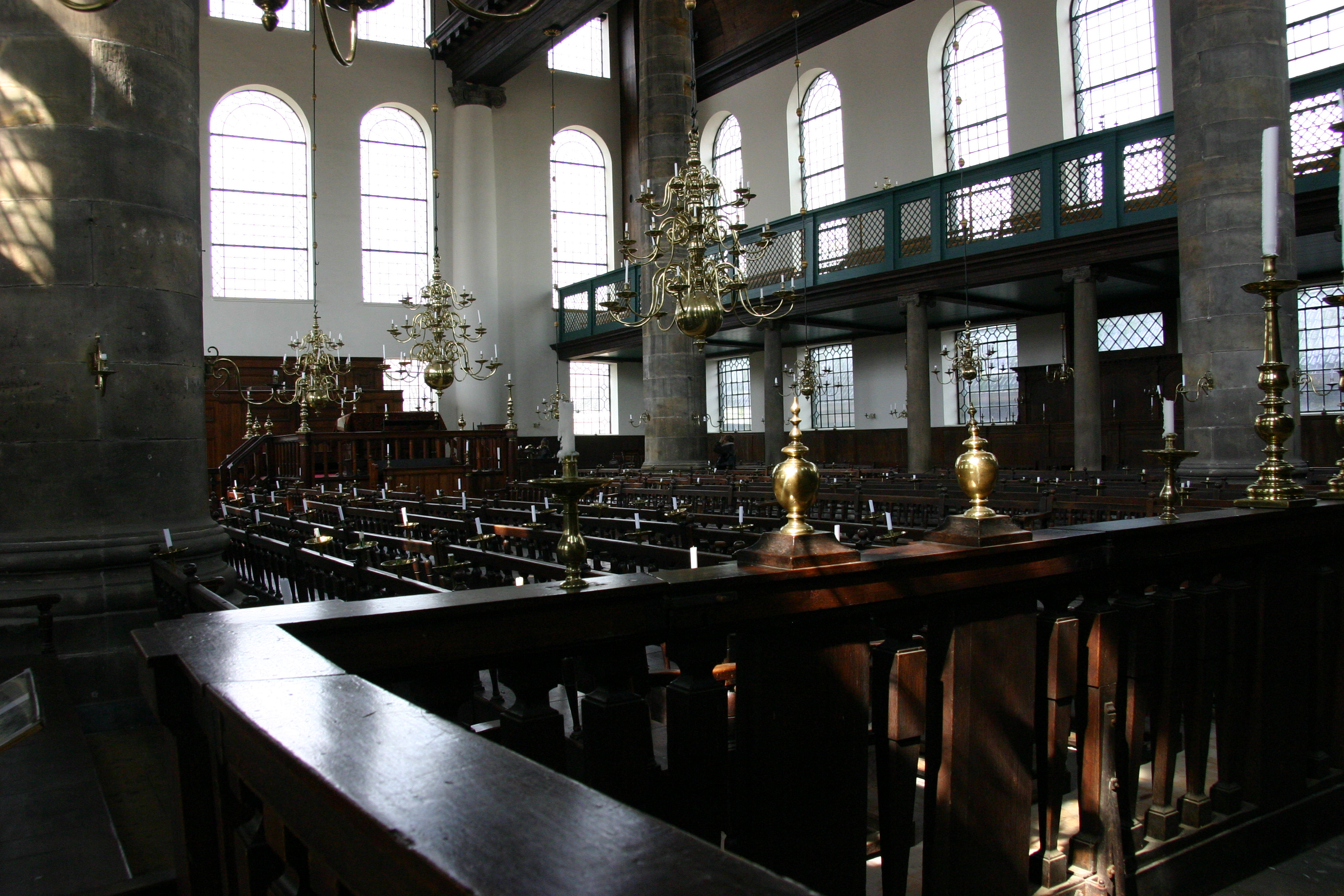
The interior of the Esnoga

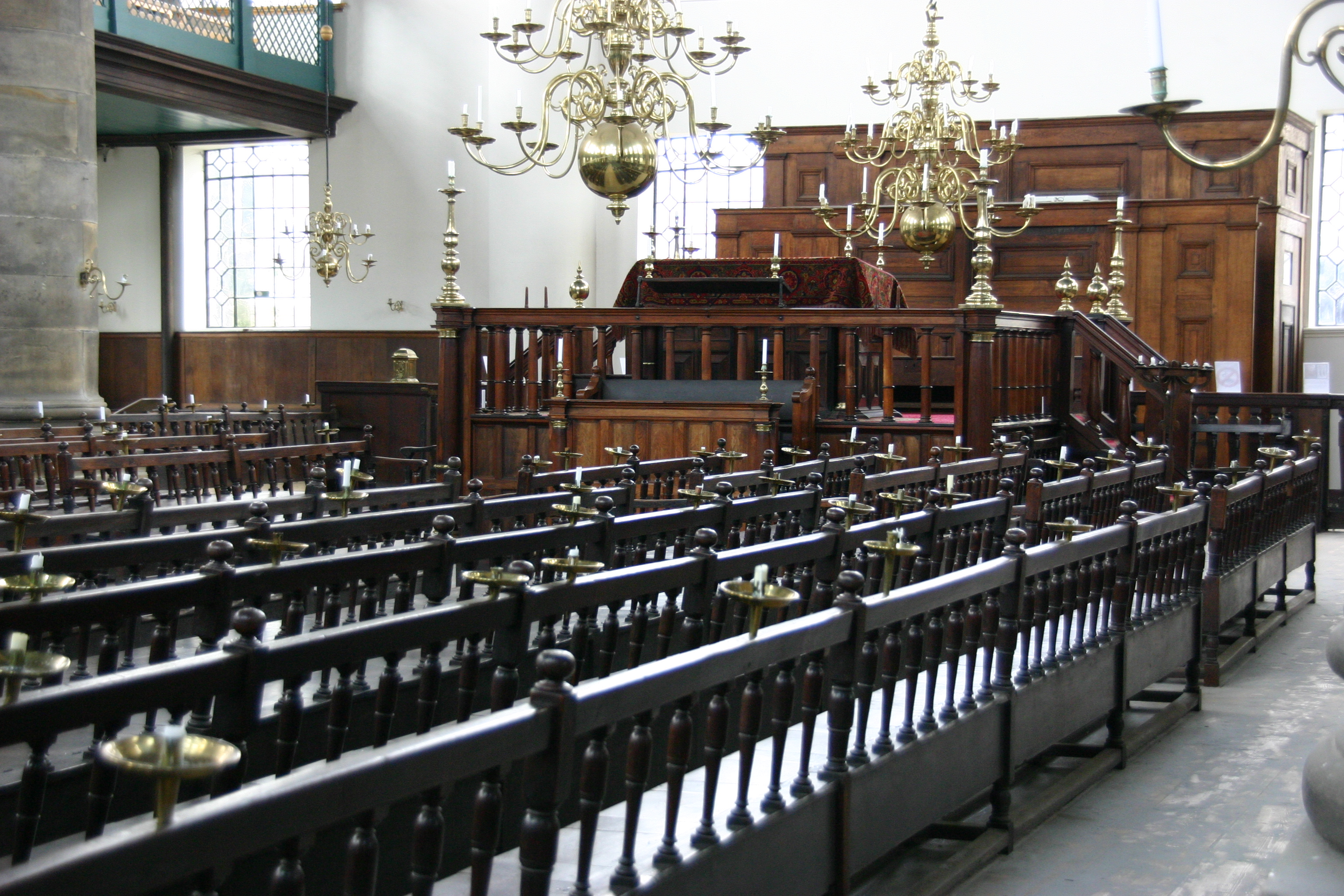
Benches in the Esnoga

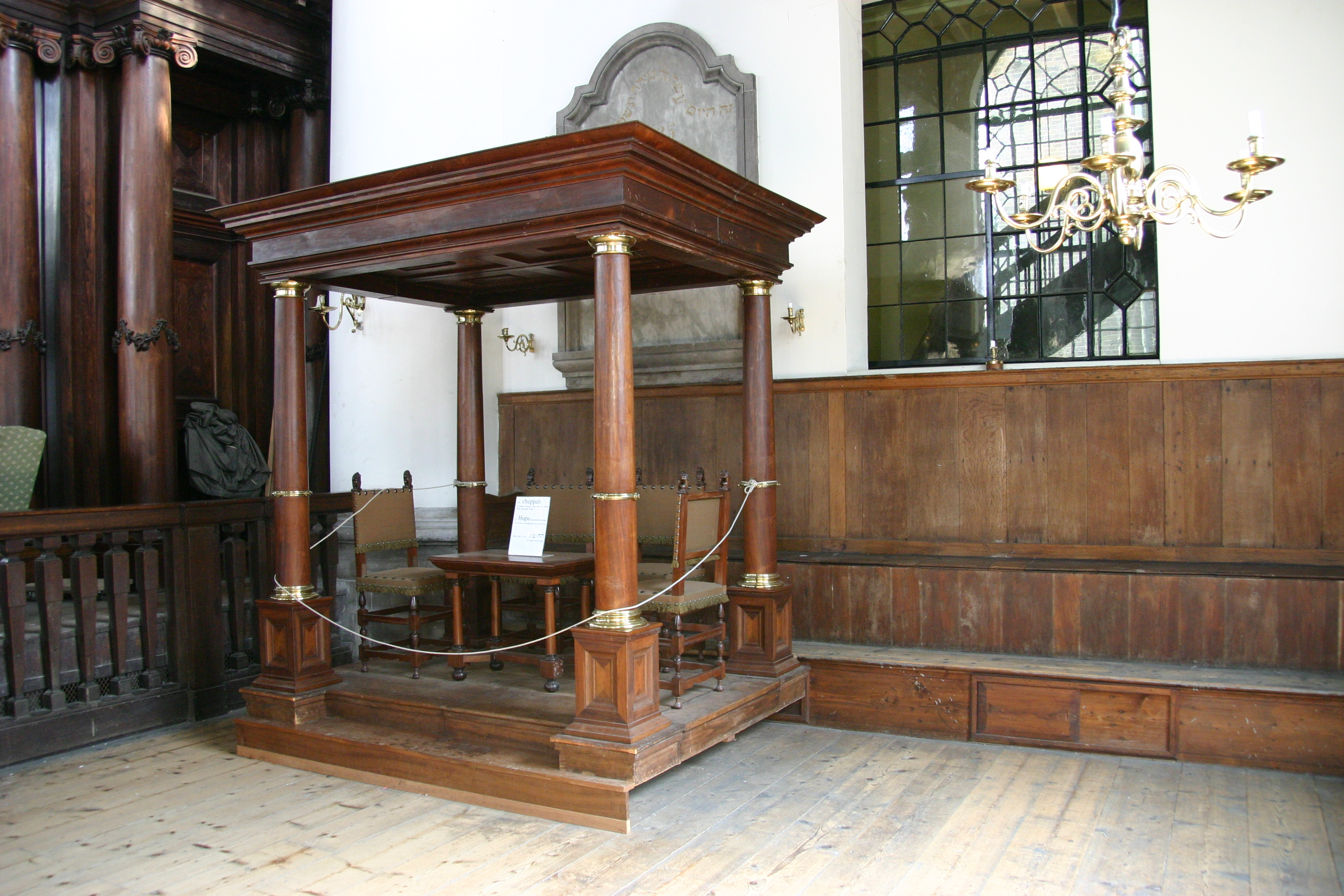
Wedding canopy

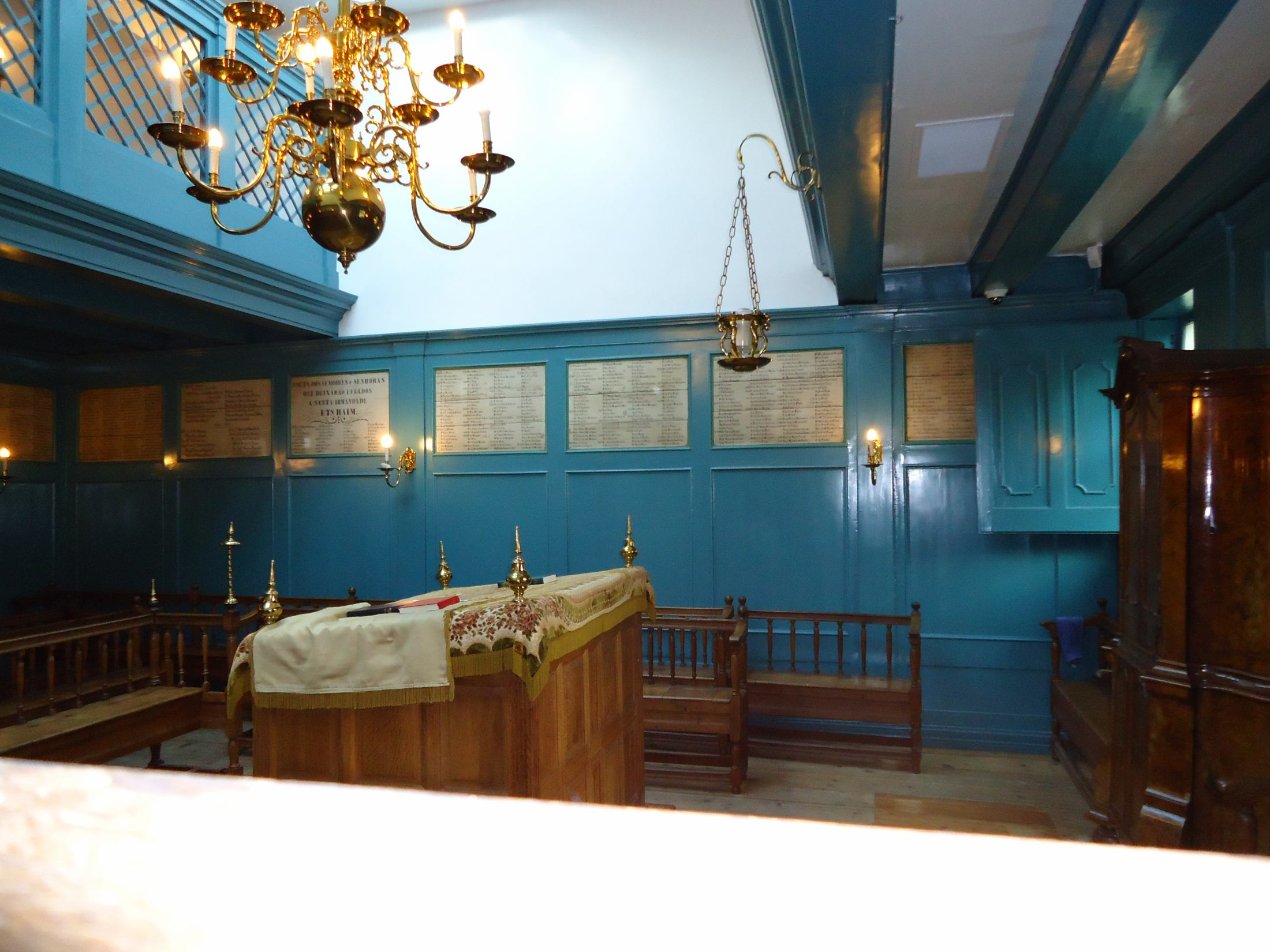
Chapel in the compound

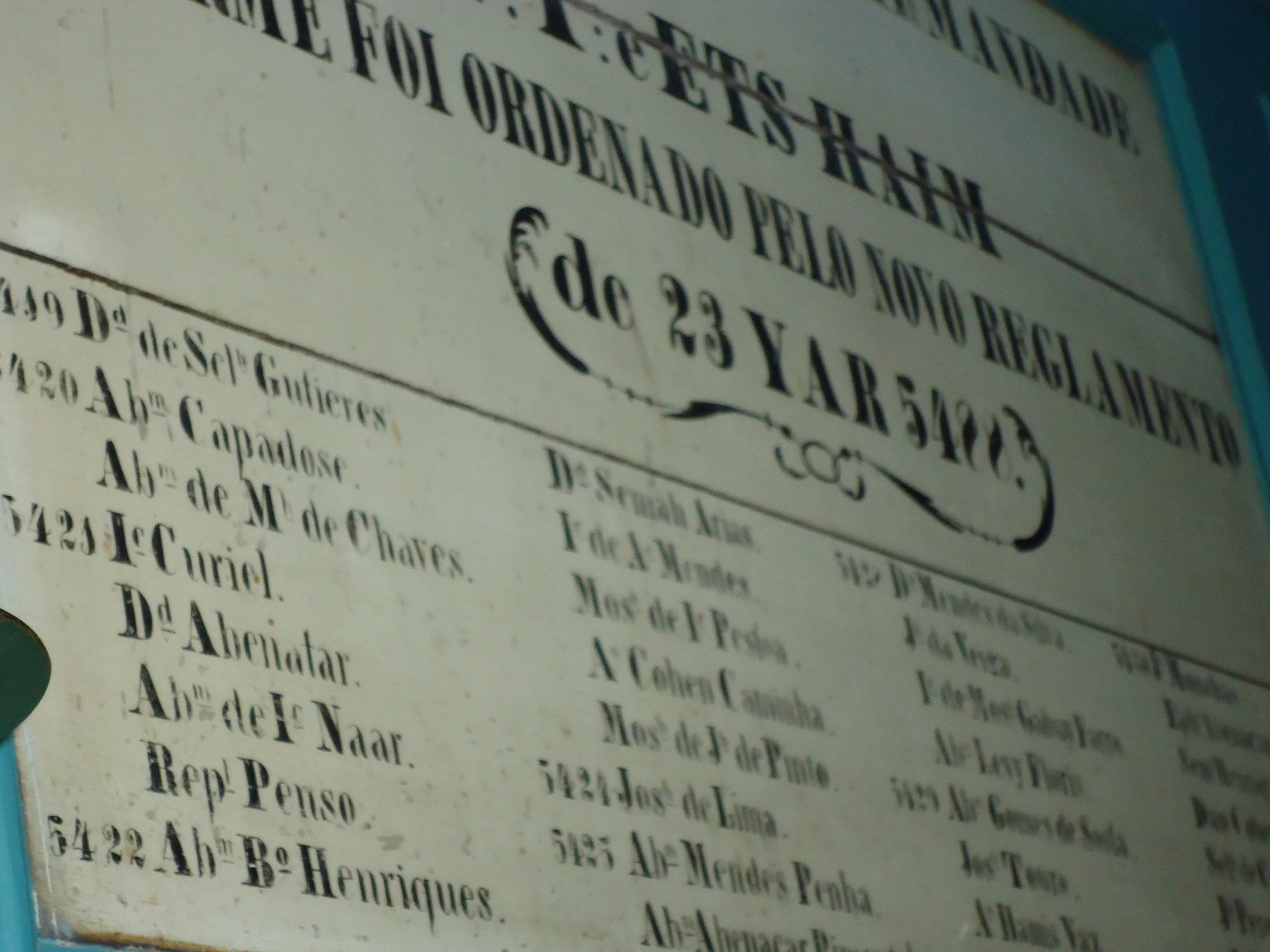
Memorial plaques in the chapel

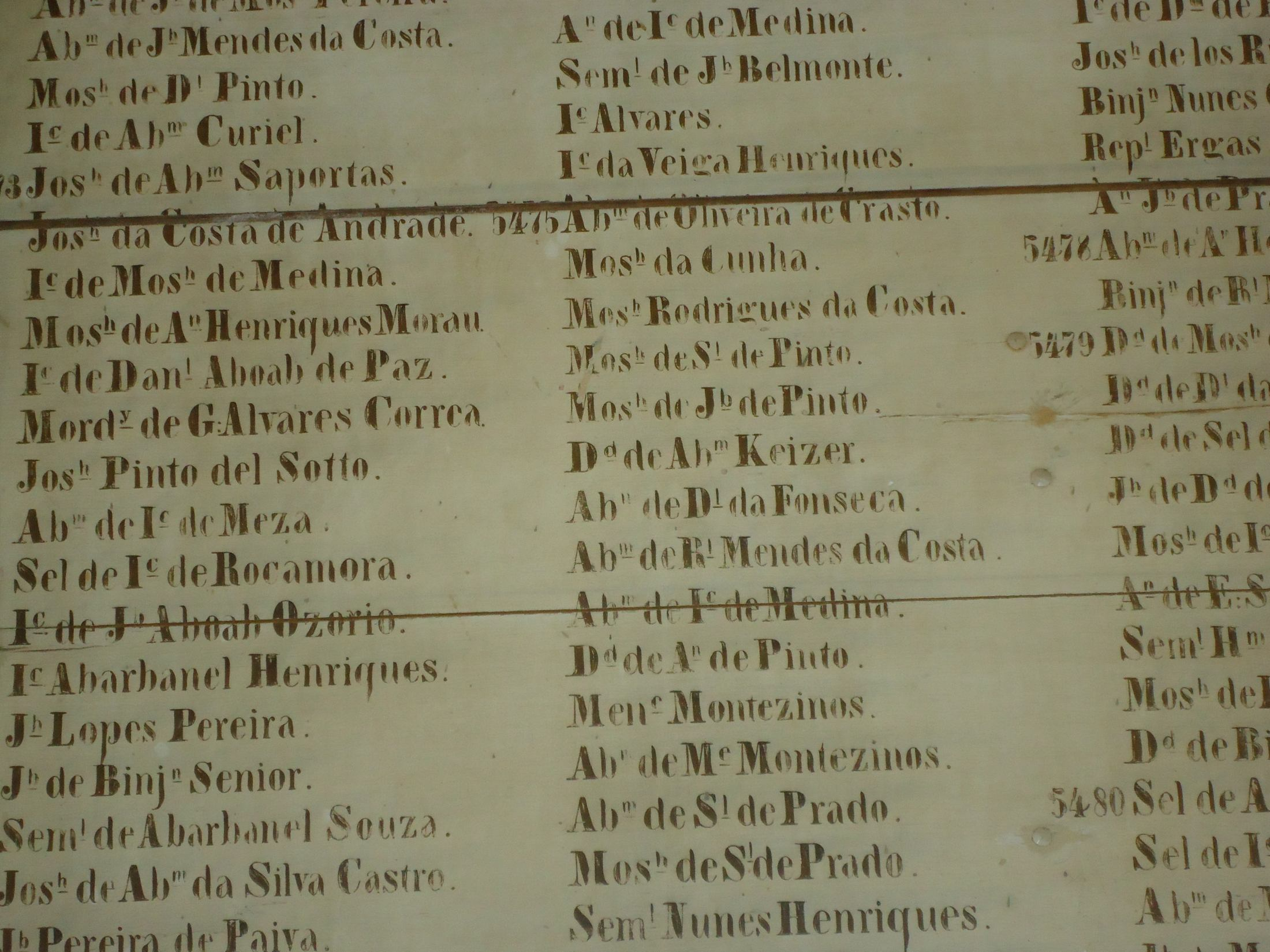
Memorial chapel

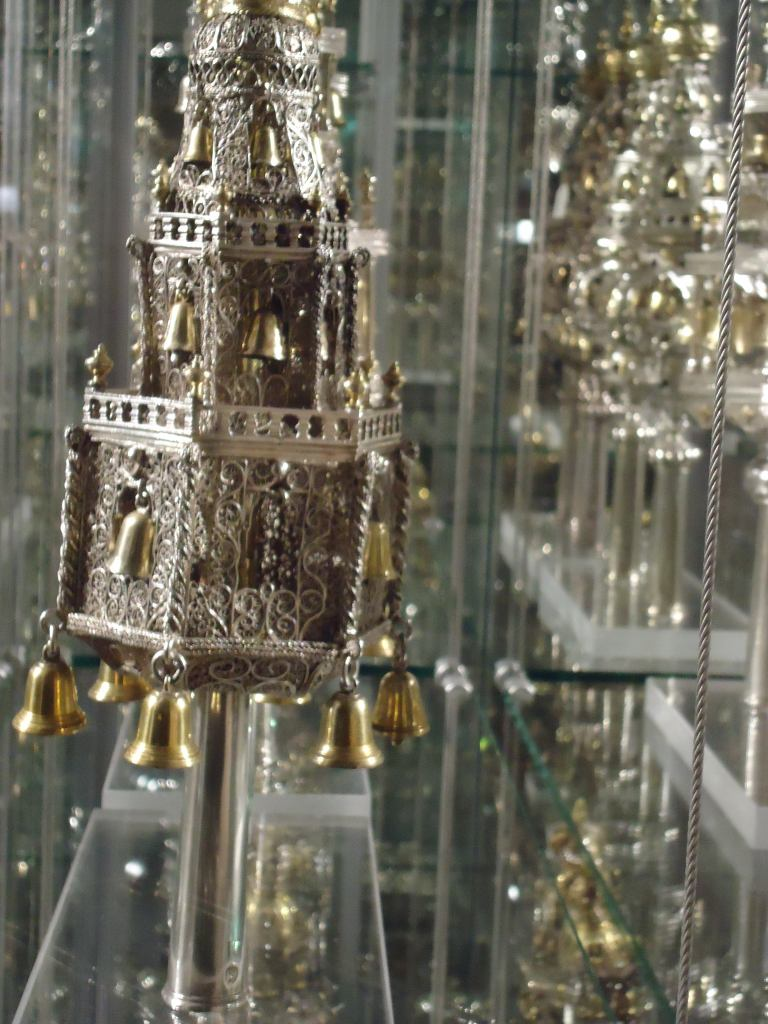
Silver Torah decorations

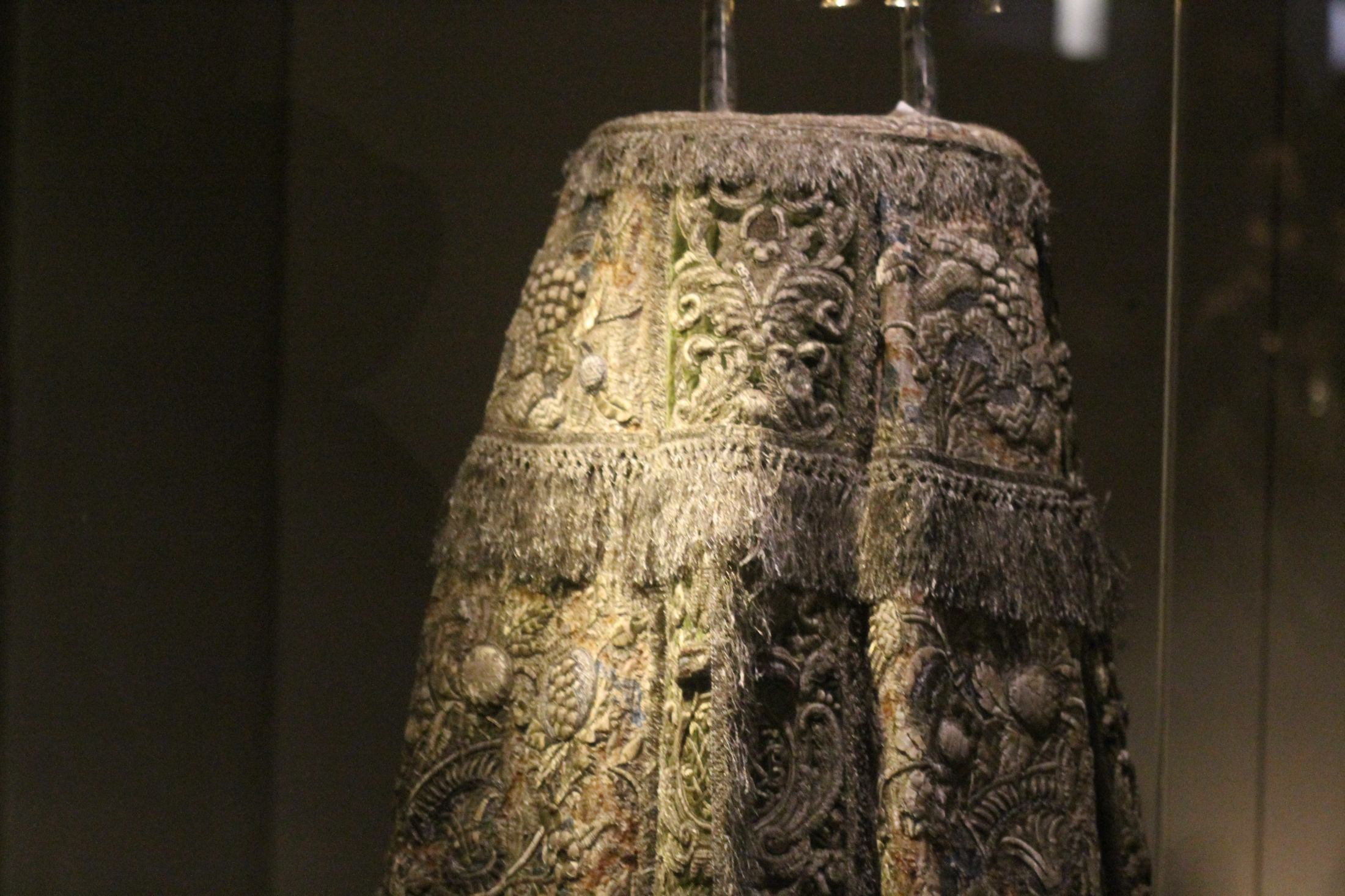
Cloth Torah cover

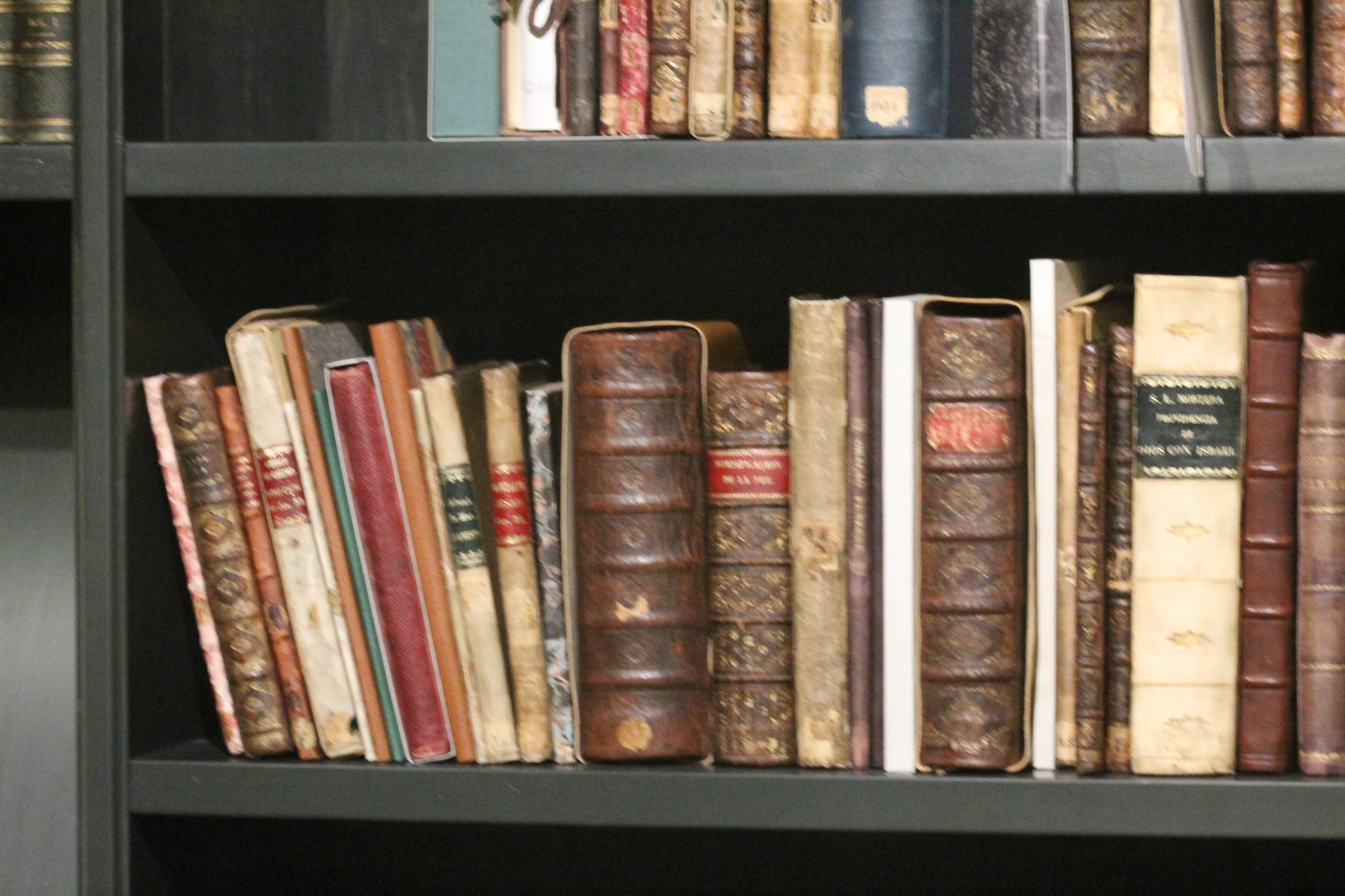
Books from the Ets Haim Library on display

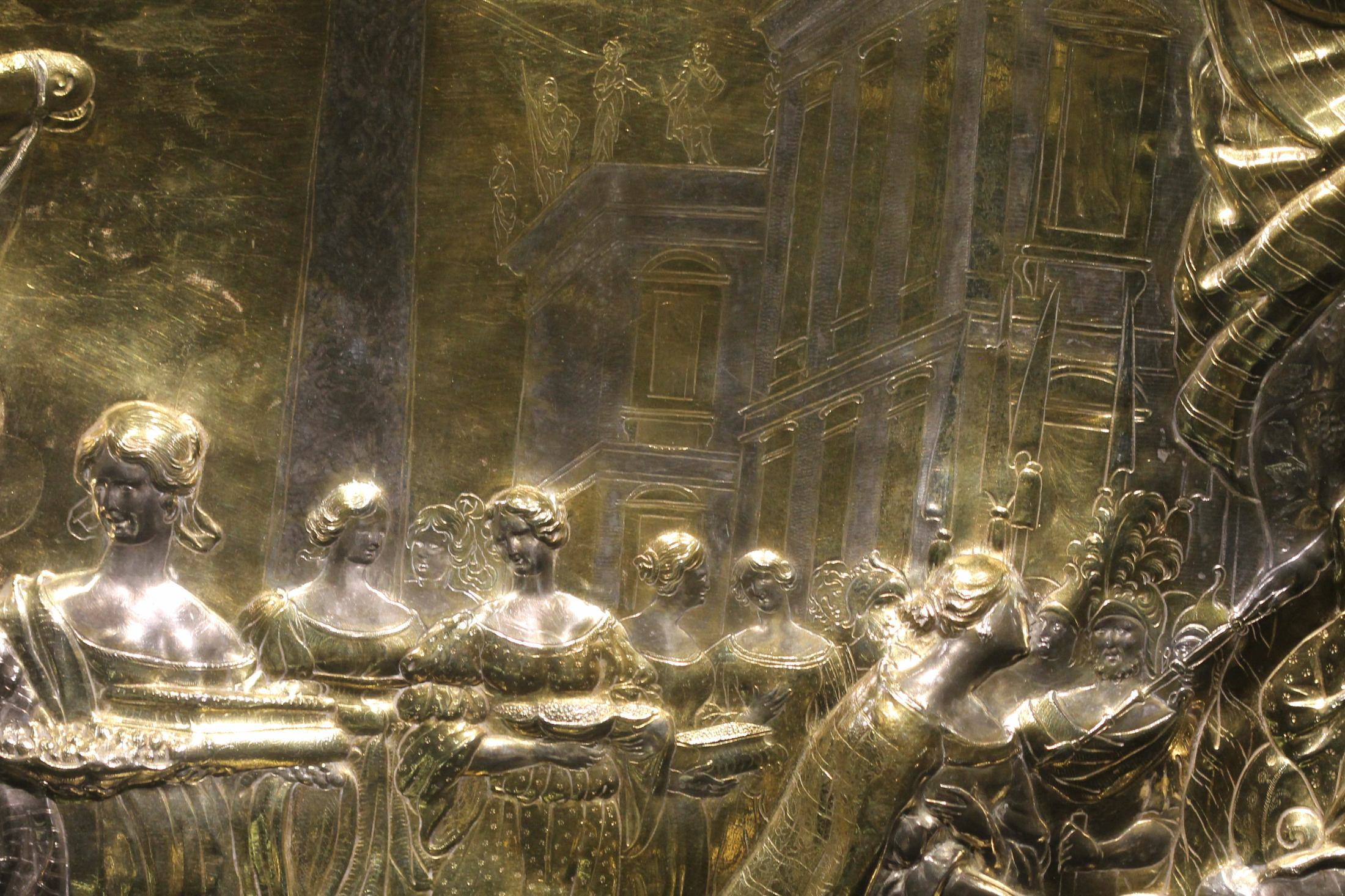
Detail of basin

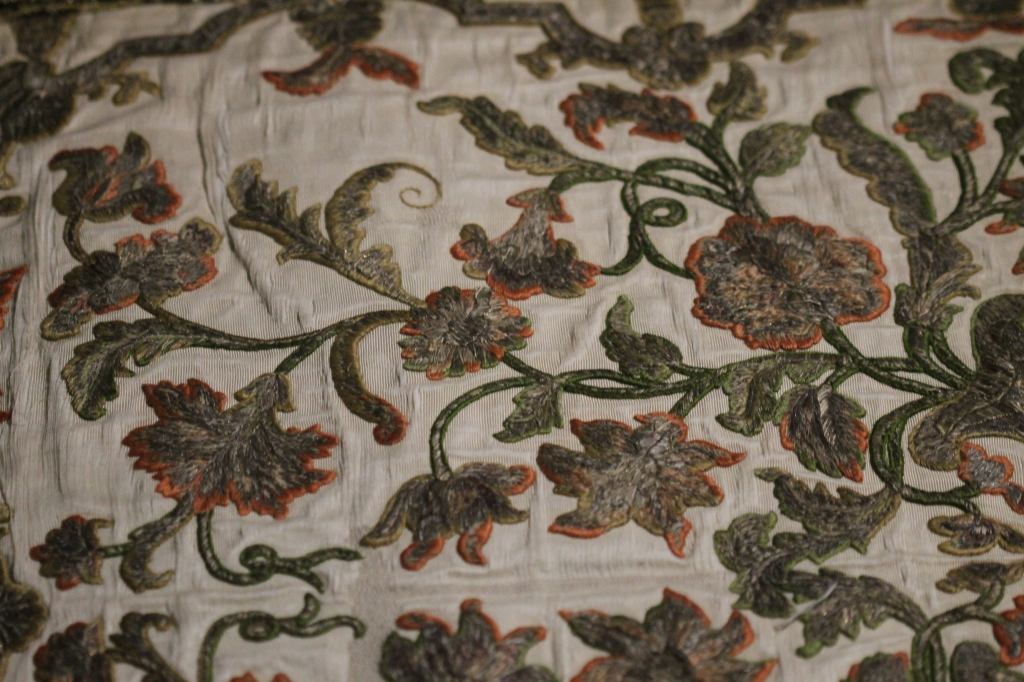
Detail of cloth from Torah decorations

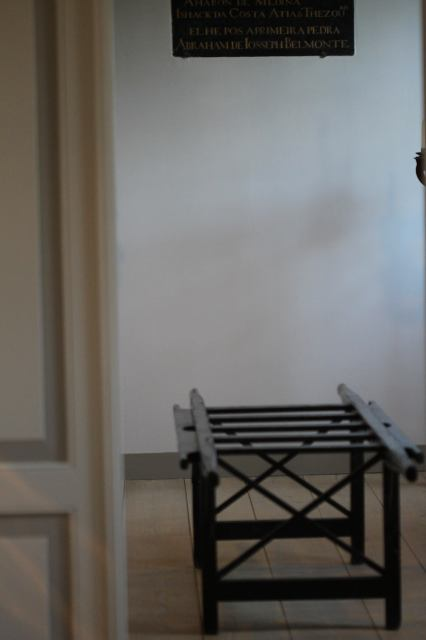
Room for mourning where the body is watched over until burial

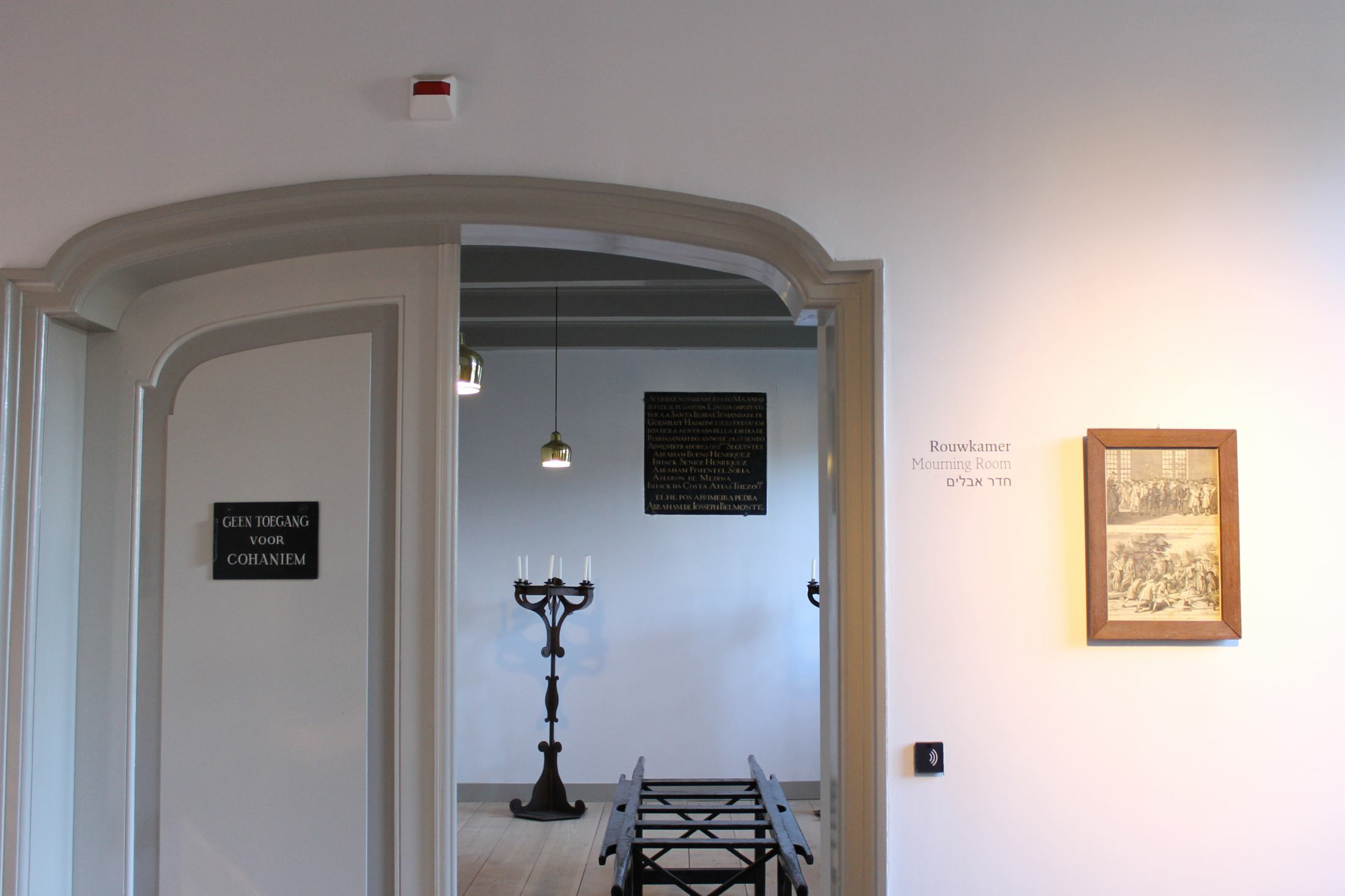
Mourning room

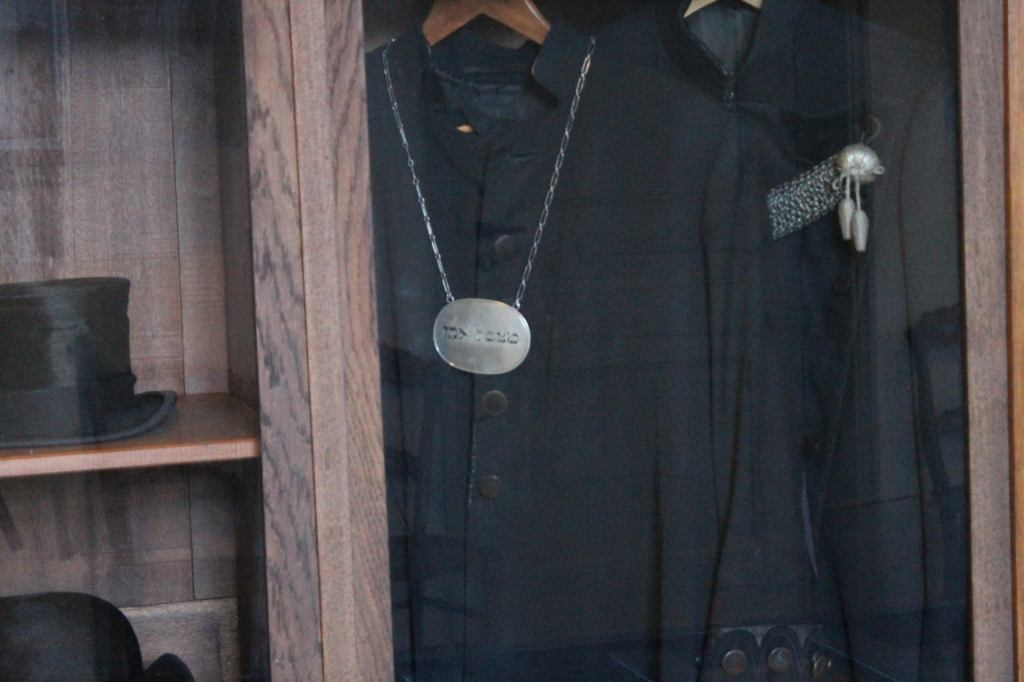
Rabbinical costume for services

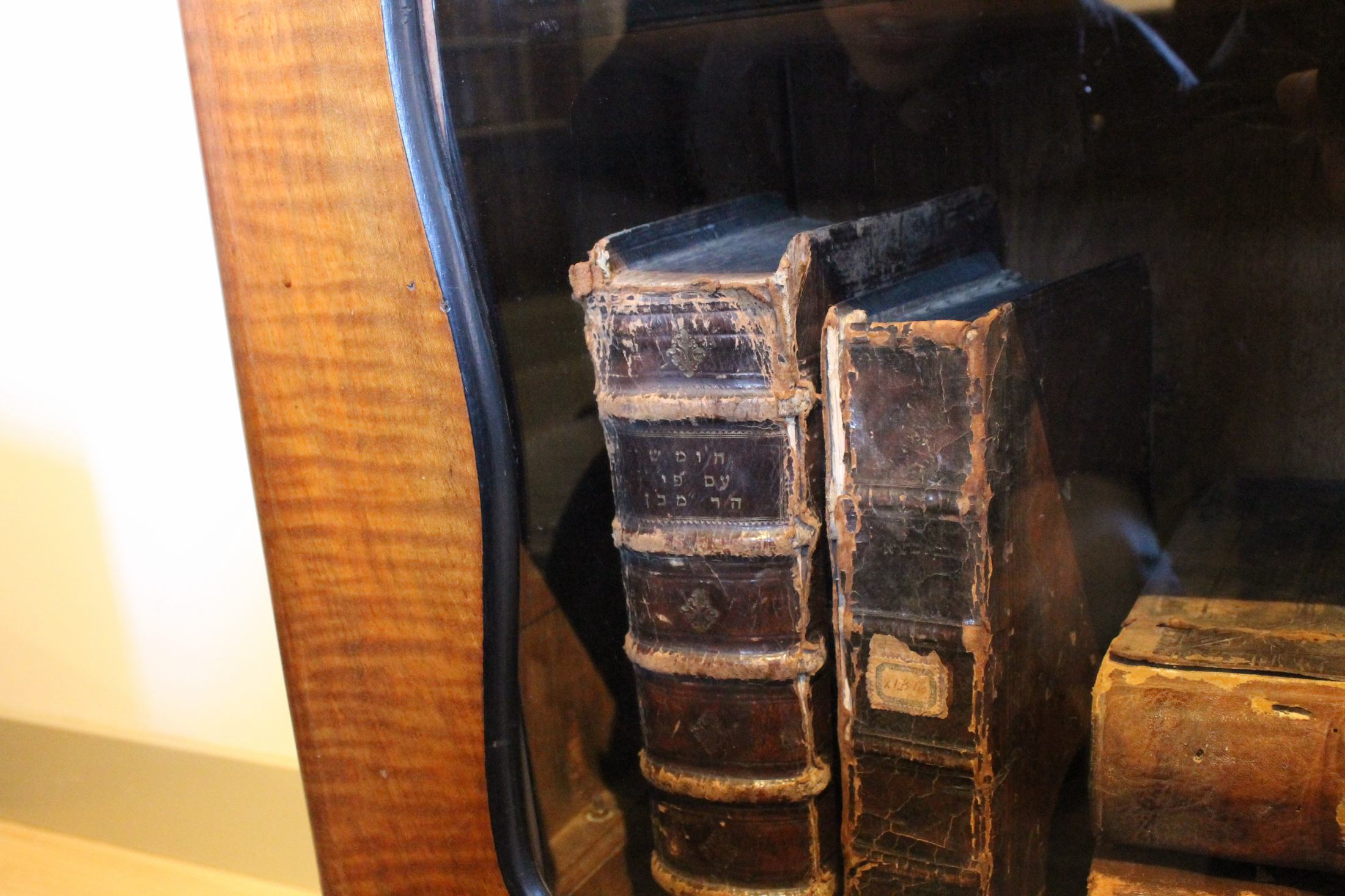
Books from Ets Haim

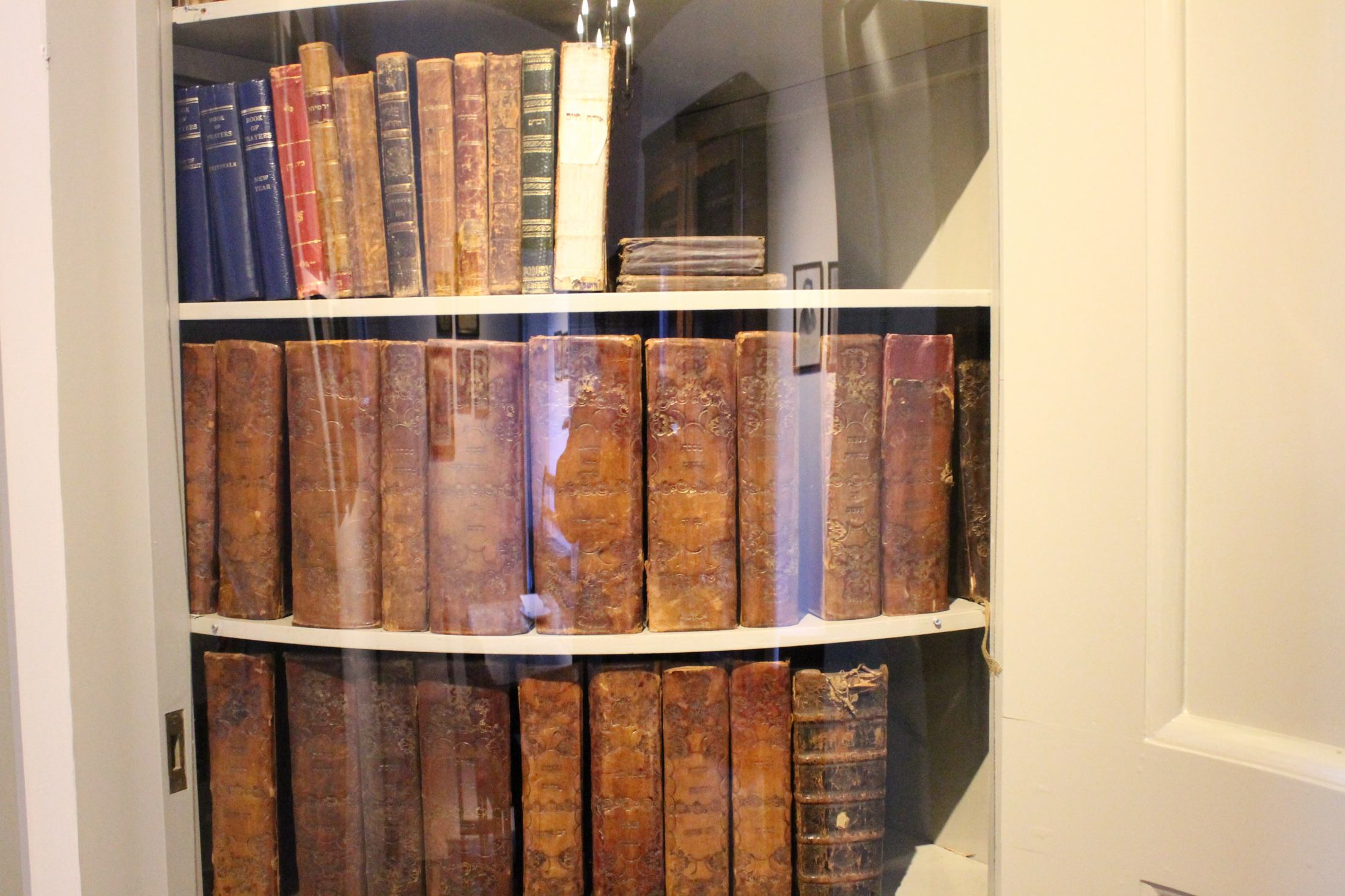
Books from Ets Haim

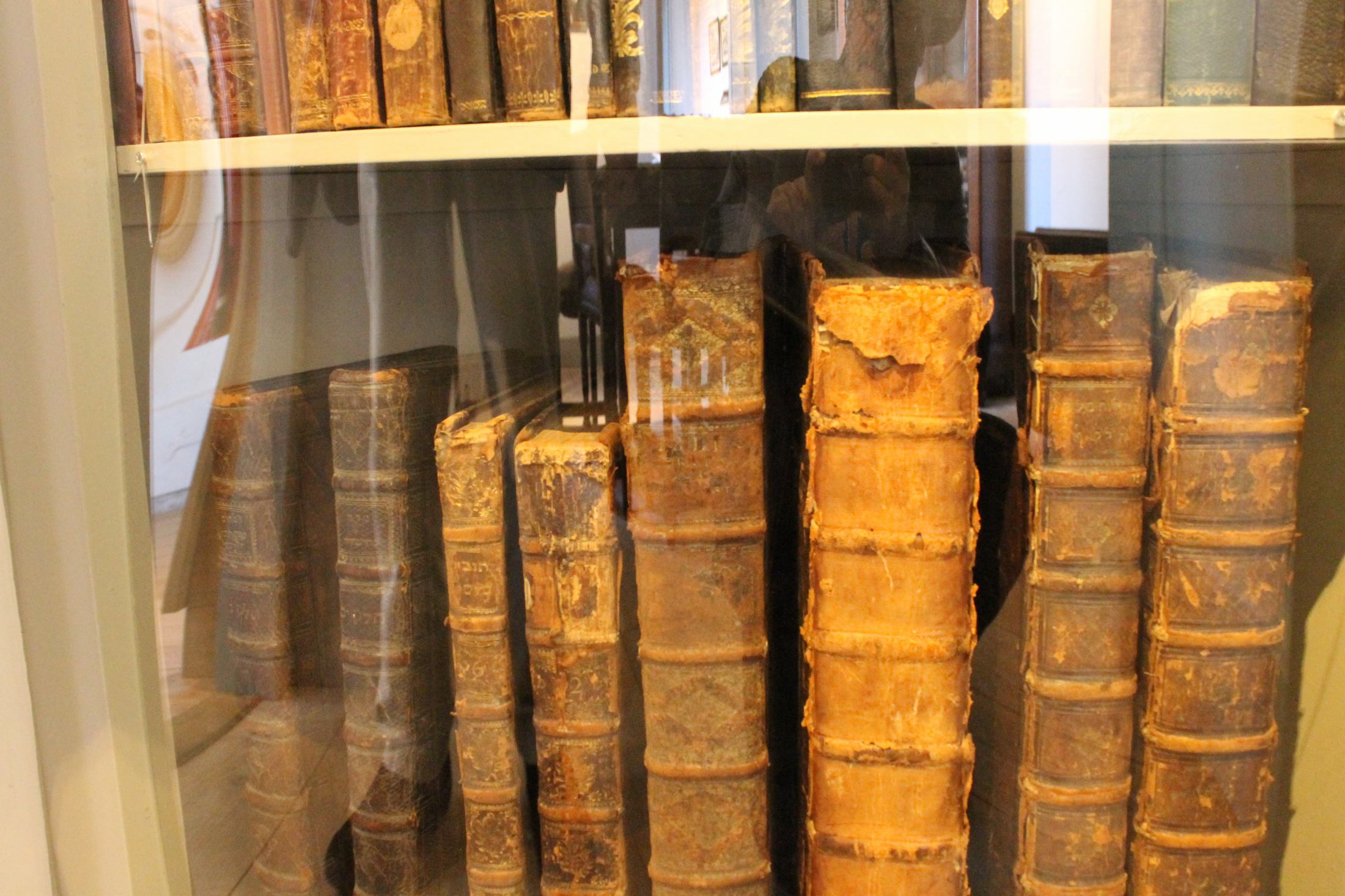
Books from Ets Haim

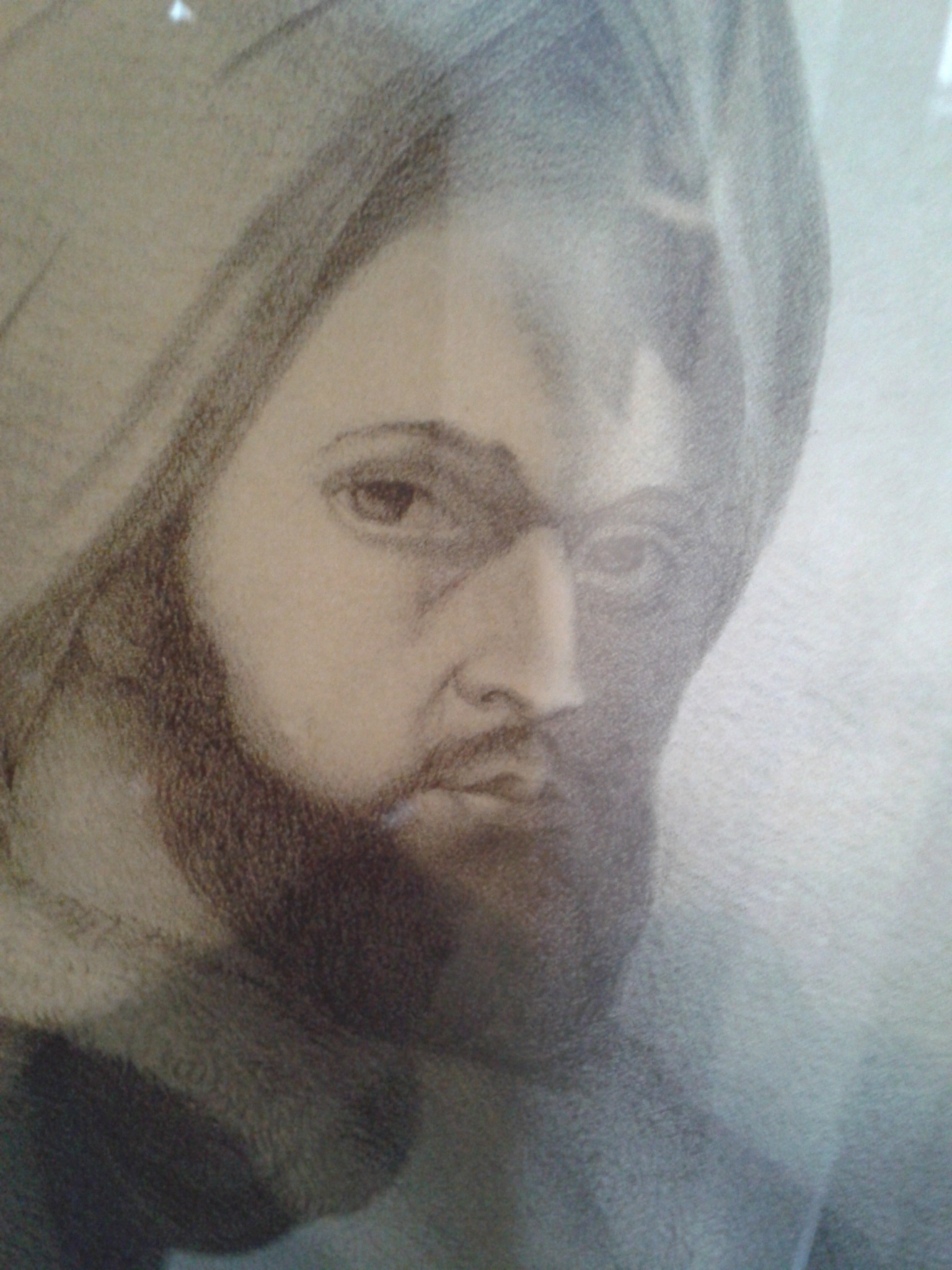
A close-up of Hezekiah da Silva, as portrayed in a drawing found in the Rabbis' room

== See also ==
- History of the Jews in the Netherlands
- Category:Synagogues in the Netherlands
- Jekuthiel Sofer, an 18th-century scribe at the Esnoga
- Joods Historisch Museum, a Jewish historical museum occupying four former synagogues adjacent to the Esnoga
- Sephardic Jews in the Netherlands
- Tzedek ve-Shalom, Sephardic synagogue in Suriname built by a community that fled the Inquisition
