= Choluteca river basin =

The Choluteca river basin lies on the hot and dry southern Pacific coast of Honduras, and is bordered by Nicaragua to the east. The name Choluteca, thought to mean ‘broad valley,’ originates from the indigenous Chorotega tribe who inhabited the region prior to Spanish conquest. The Choluteca river and its tributaries together form the Cabeceras catchment located in southern Honduras where it stretches over four administrative departments (Francisco Morazán, Choluteca, El Paraíso and Comayagua) covering 7,848 km^{2} and drains into the Pacific Ocean. The Choluteca river basin provides water to the capital city of Tegucigalpa with population around 1 million inhabitants.

Climatically the region is characterized by having only two seasons during the year: a rainy season lasting from May to October and a dry season from November to April with a shorter dry season lasting 2 weeks near the end of July. Efforts at improving water storage during the rainy season aim to address inadequate supplies and meet water demands during the dry season. Water shortages are one of the main challenges facing Tegucigalpa and the areas making up the Choluteca river basin. Other significant challenges include poor water quality from untreated industrial effluents and sewage discharging into the river network, and severe risk of flooding from tropical storms and hurricanes. Non-structural efforts to increase water availability include the recent (Aug. 2009) approval of a new General Water Law which, among other achievements, created a National Water Authority to oversee decentralized institutions. Following on, World Bank and Inter-American Development Bank projects are financing efficiency improvements. The development banks are also fostering the strengthening of institutions and sectors.

== Water resource base ==
=== Choluteca river basin in numbers ===
Choluteca River
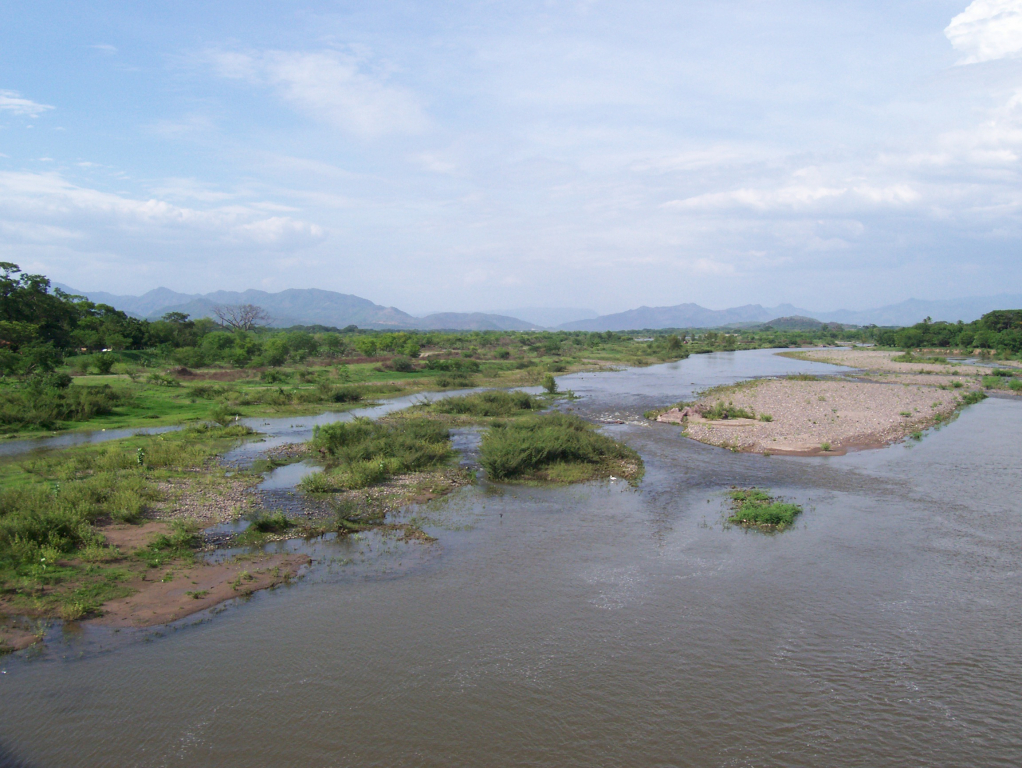
- Choluteca River near the city of Choluteca

Location
- Country: Honduras

Physical characteristics
- Source
  - location: Choluteca, Choluteca, Honduras
- Mouth: Pacific Ocean
  - location: Honduras
  - elevation: 0 m (0 ft)
- Length: 349 km (217 mi)

Choluteca Watershed

- Area: 7,976 km^{2}
- Average Precipitation (mm) = 1,327
- Water flow: 104 m^{3} per second
- Module: 13 lps/km^{2} per year
- Discharge of Sediment: 8,986 Tons per day
- Total range: 411–2,056 Ton/km^{2} per year

Source: Inter-American Development Bank (2007)

== Water resources management by sector ==
=== Drinking water and sanitation ===
Drinking water provided by the Choluteca river is not of good quality. Two reservoirs serve Tegucigalpa: Concepción (1992) and Laureles (1976), and the water is also taken from the Picacho and Sabacuante tributaries. Each of these four water sources has its own treatment plant from where the treated water is sent to 84 holding tanks located throughout the city. Regulation of treated water from the reservoirs is not consistent and is mostly controlled by the managers at each respective treatment plant. Despite inconsistent access to running water, 50% of the population buys additional bottled drinking water from private companies.

Sanitation services throughout the Choluteca River Basin and especially in Tegucigalpa are poor. Range of coverage is very low and service quality is not good. Nearby storage reservoirs are adversely affected by ongoing urbanization of Tegucigalpa, therefore, rivers such as the Choluteca, Chiquito, and Guacerique are heavily polluted. (Source: Grant funding request for the Water Partnership Program)

=== Irrigation and drainage ===
The Choluteca province is the third largest in terms of land area irrigated (7,105 ha) for agricultural production. Important to the region, melons, watermelons, and sugarcane are all heavily irrigated. The Inter-American Development Bank has reported that overuse of water for irrigation has led to surface and groundwater flows at the mouth of the Choluteca River being considerably reduced. Renewable volume of groundwater in the Pacific slope has been estimated to be 1.1 km^{3} per year. A reduction in this volume has been reported in the valleys of Choluteca, Tegucigalpa and Comayagua due to extensive irrigation.

=== Hydropower ===
Most hydroelectric potential and current output in Honduras is located on the Cangrejal, Patuca, and Ulua rivers. There was a proposal, however, for a hydroelectric project to be installed at Three Valleys on the Choluteca river with a capacity of 26 mW and height of 65 meters. Although proposed, there is no hydropower plant at this location to date.

== Legal and institutional framework ==
=== Legal framework ===
Legislative decree number 218 from December 1996 established new responsibilities for the General Directorate of Water Resources (La Dirección General de Recursos Hídricos) for managing the financing and technical aspects of irrigation and drainage projects in Honduras. Decree 218 also required the directorate to provide the theoretical framework for water use and management in agricultural activities.

Executive Decree 023 from October 1, 2002, officially declared the shortage of drinking water in Tegucigalpa as an emergency and demands on SANAA to perform all the required procedures to confront the challenge and propose solutions were made.

=== Institutional framework ===
- FORCUENCAS Strengthening of local management of natural resources in the Patuca, Choluteca and Black Rivers.
- Choluteca Rotary Club: installs water filters in communities throughout the basin.
- Intermunicipal river associations (Mancomunidades) in municipalities, cities, and towns throughout the river basin.
- The Secretariat of Agriculture with PROMANGLE is carrying out a mangrove restoration and water project in the Choluteca basin.

For more on the national level framework, see: Water Resources Management in Honduras

- SERNA (La Secretaría de Recursos Naturales y Ambiente)- SERNA, the Ministry of Natural Resources and Environment is charged with responsibly utilizing water resources and sectoral management of water resources.
- DGRH (The General Directorate of Water Resources (La Dirección General de Recursos Hídricos (DGRH)), attached to SERNA, is charged with the development, operation, and maintenance of irrigation systems. DGRH also maps water use concessions and follows up on hydrological data.
- SANAA (Servicio Autonomo Nacional de Acueductos y Alcantarillados)- SANAA is the country's national utility for moving water and providing drainage and sewage systems. SANNA is responsible for the operation of about half of the country's urban water and sewage systems. Particular focus is on the management of Choluteca waters that supply Tegucigalpa.

== Environmental issues ==
=== Water related risks ===
As population density increases in the urban areas that the Choluteca River basin serves, excessive use and lack of treatment is expected to increase the rate of environmental degradation. Adding to the risk, untreated industrial wastewater originating in Tegucigalpa is discharged directly into the Choluteca. These problems along with sewage that drains into the Choluteca River as it crosses the city signal an urgent need for rehabilitation to mitigate some of the growing water quality risks.

=== Potential climate change impacts ===
According to the Global Climate Risk Index 4 constructed for the period between 1997 and 2006, Honduras is the most vulnerable country in the world to the potential impacts of Climate Change. A vulnerability analysis by UNEP's Global International Waters Assessment of water resources shows an overall reduction in future discharges from the Choluteca river basin. For the Choluteca River, under a scenario of a 1-2 °C temperature increase and 10-15% increase in rainfall, run-off during the rainy season will increase by 18-20%. In contrast, discharges will decrease by between 31% and 21% if there is a reduction in rainfall of 10-15% and a temperature increase of 1 °C.

== External assistance and notable programs ==
In 2007, The World Bank approved a US$30 million loan for the Water and Sanitation Sector Modernization Project in Honduras. Project areas relevant to the Choluteca river basin include: 1) Empower national sector actors to fulfill new roles for successful decentralization of services; and 2) Reduce non-revenue water in selected areas of Tegucigalpa to provide immediate impact on the service quality.

The Inter-American Development Bank approved a 40-year US$30 million loan to Honduras in 2006 that is now ('09) in implementation phases of making improvements in potable water and improving finance infrastructures. The program also finances studies for transferring Tegucigalpa's potable water, currently managed by SANAA, to the Municipality of the Central District of Tegucigalpa. Most of the resources from this Inter-American Development Bank loan are being used to finance expansion of potable water.

A 2003 USAID collaborative project with the Zamorano Pan-American Agricultural School is targeting improved management of water sources in the lower basins of the Choluteca and Negro Rivers in southern Honduras. This program supports small-scale irrigation systems and water-harvesting systems, and also commissioned a detailed basin-wide study of the densely populated Choluteca River watershed to assist decision-makers in improving efficiency of water use, development planning, and resource allocation. More specific program activities include low-cost practices to protect the water supplies, improve water storage for farming and irrigation, and community-based watershed management and protection. The USAID project contribution is $1.3 Million. The estimated amount of the Zamorano and local participants in the project is $354,000.
