= Champotón =

Champotón may refer to:

- Champotón River
- Champotón, Campeche
- Champotón Municipality
