= Choluteca =

Choluteca may refer to:

- Choluteca, Choluteca, a city in Honduras
- Choluteca Department, a governmental region in Honduras
- Choluteca River, a river in Honduras
