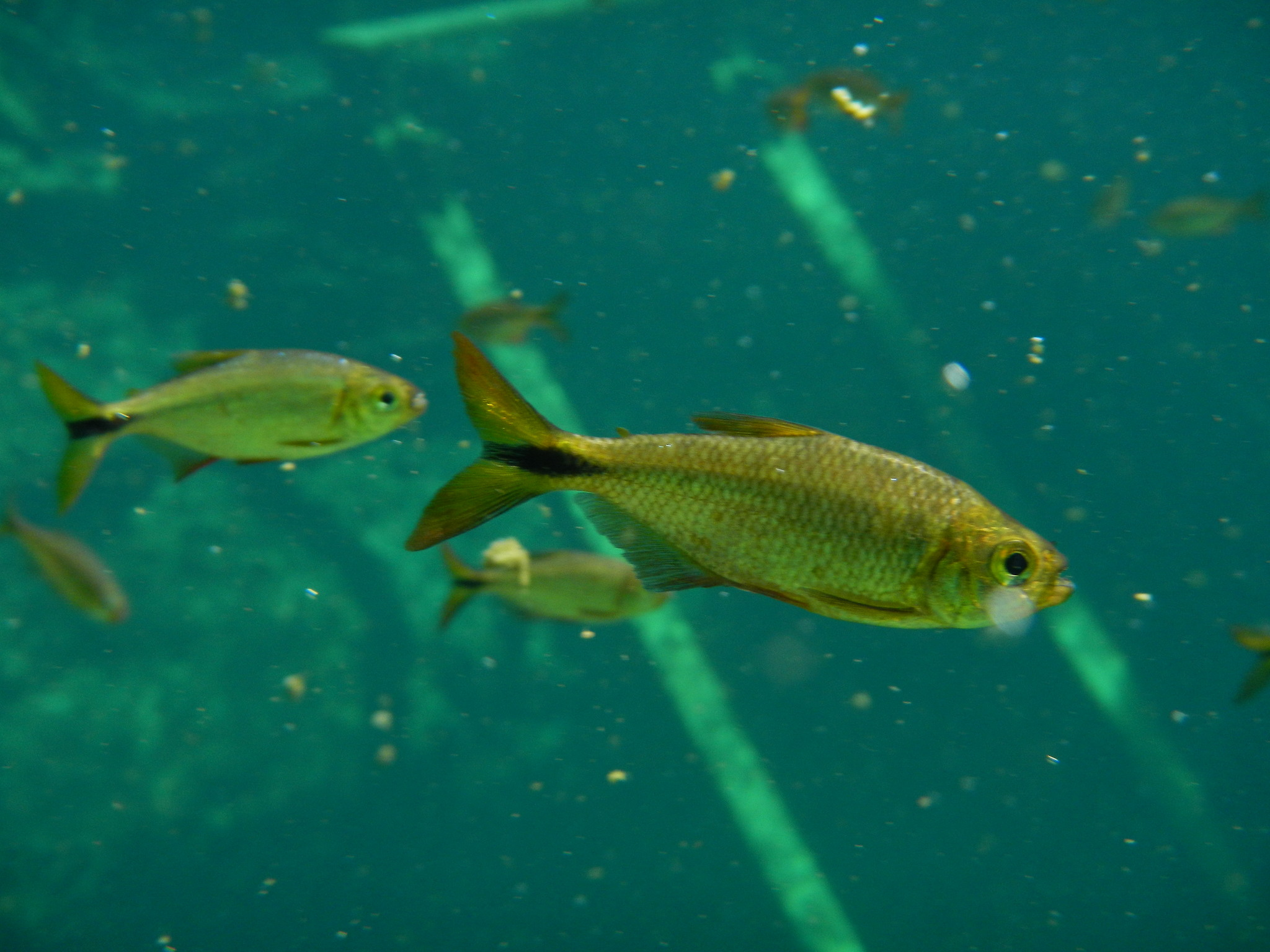

Conservation status
- Least Concern (IUCN 3.1)

Scientific classification
- Kingdom: Animalia
- Phylum: Chordata
- Class: Actinopterygii
- Order: Characiformes
- Family: Acestrorhamphidae
- Genus: Astyanax
- Species: A. bacalarensis

Binomial name
- Astyanax bacalarensis Schmitter-Soto, 2017

= Astyanax bacalarensis =

Species of fish

Astyanax bacalarensis, sometimes referred to as the Bacalar tetra, is a species of freshwater ray-finned fish belonging to the family Acestrorhamphidae, the American characins. This fish is found in Mexico and Central America. Its scientific and common names both refer to its type locality, Lake Bacalar in Mexico, and it further inhabits freshwater environments like cenotes, streams, and wetlands. Its widespread nature, paired with an omnivorous diet, make it a hardy species.

Before its nomination, A. bacalarensis was considered synonymous with Astyanax aeneus. The silver scales and humeral spot that A. bacalarensis sports are not uncommon features in its genus, but it can be differentiated from congeners by several means. Its fins have some unique markings, like a patch of bright red on the anal fin, and its humeral spot is rectangular or ovoid, instead of triangular or p-shaped in some other Astyanax.

== Taxonomy ==
Astyanax bacalarensis was first described by Mexican ichthyologist Juan Jacobo Schmitter-Soto during a revision of the genus in 2017. Before being identified as a different species altogether, specimens of A. bacalarensis were often classified as specimens of congener Astyanax aeneus (the banded tetra). There are various subgenera in Astyanax - Poecilurichthys, Zygogaster, and Astyanax itself - and A. bacalarensis belongs to Astyanax, based on a complete predorsal series of scales.

=== Etymology ===
The genus Astyanax has a name which is an allusion to the Iliad, in which a Trojan warrior named Astyanax appeared. The reason for this allusion was not made clear by Spencer Fullerton Baird and Charles Frédéric Girard when they named the genus, but it may originate in the scales of type species, Astyanax argentatus, which are large and silver, like armor or a shield. The specific name, "bacalarensis", is in reference to the type locality of the species, Lake Bacalar, with the suffix "-ensis" denoting a location.

Astyanax bacalarensis is sometimes called the Bacalar tetra.

== Description ==
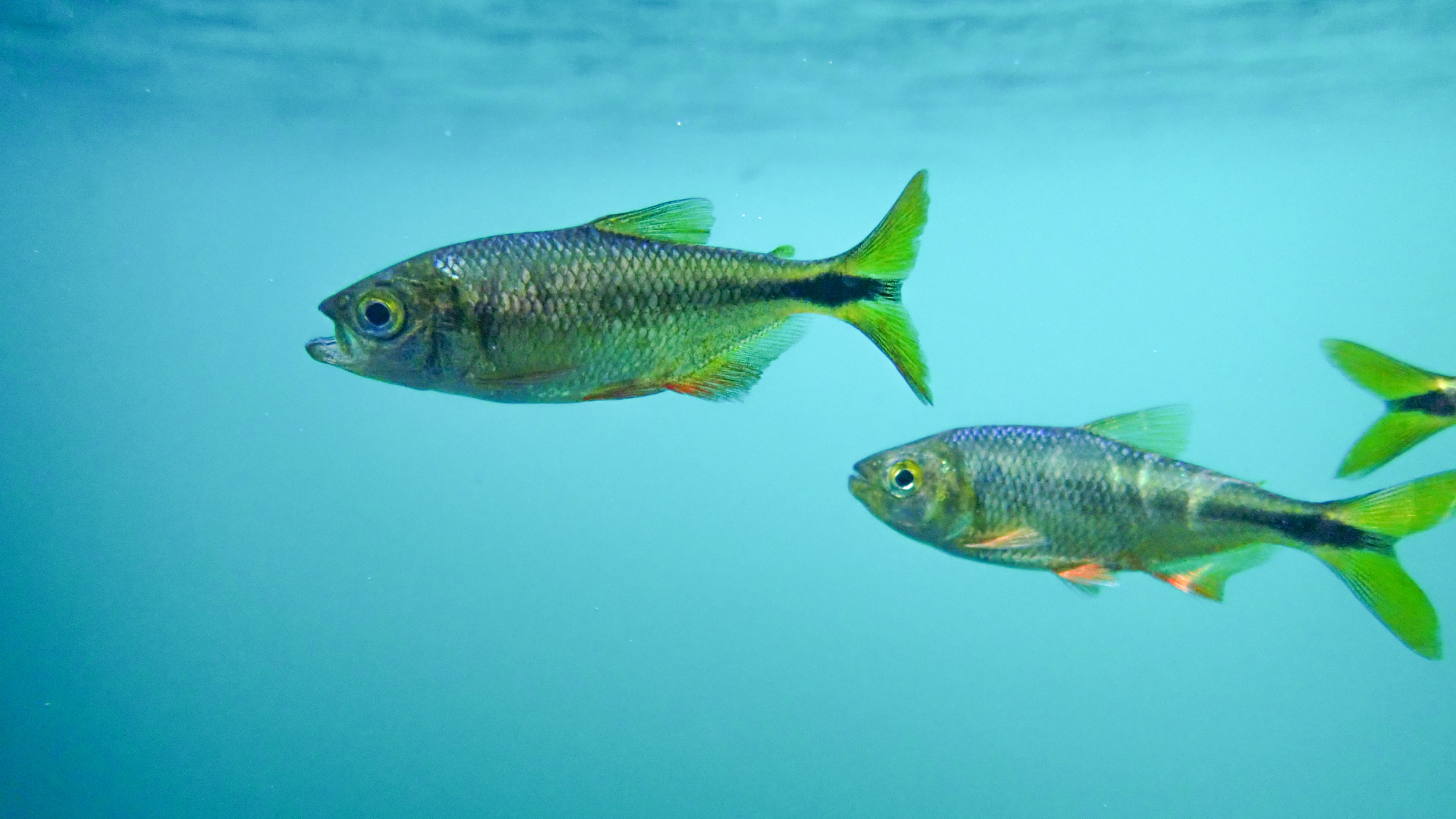
Astyanax bacalarensis

Astyanax bacalarensis reaches 9.5 cm (3.7 in) standard length (SL), and the head makes up roughly a quarter of this (28% or less SL). The origin of the dorsal fin is in the center of the body, and the fin itself has 9–11 rays. The anal fin has 21–27 rays, most often 25, and the pectoral fins have 10–11 rays. Sexual dimorphism is unknown.

Astyanax bacalarensis is mostly silver, and has a single dark humeral spot that is rectangular or ovoid. The anal fin has a light margin, but is otherwise a uniform yellow, with a touch of bright red on the first few rays. There is a black spot on the caudal peduncle that continues onto the middle rays of the caudal fin. The dorsal fin is lemon-yellow, the caudal fin is orange, and the pectoral and pelvic fins are largely clear or yellowish with red margins.

== Distribution and habitat ==
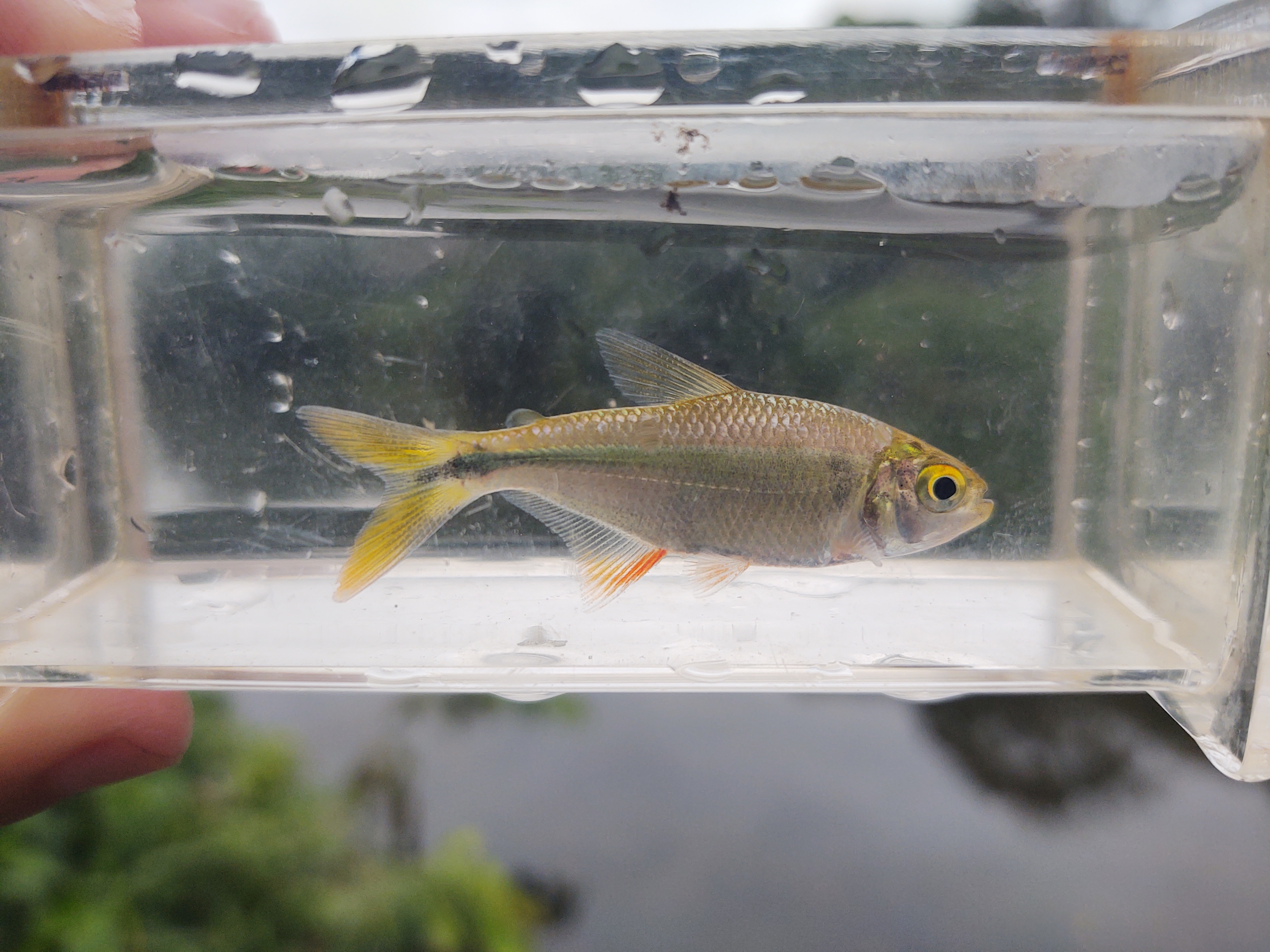
A bacalar tetra caught out of the Macal River near San Ignacio, Belize (March 29, 2024).

Astyanax bacalarensis was originally described from Lake Bacalar in the Mexican state of Quintana Roo. It has been further cited from Sittee River in the Toledo district of Belize, as well as from the Mopán River in Guatemala. Though it is largely a freshwater fish, it has been described from delta areas in the Chetumal Bay (in the Caribbean Sea) with middling levels of salinity for the region (9 psu, practical salinity units; for comparison, the ocean averages 34.7 psu). It can also be found in cenotes on the Yucatán peninsula, as well as in caves and in seasonal wetlands.

== Diet and ecology ==
As a juvenile, A. bacalarensis is planktivorous, but graduates to omnivory as an adult. In turn, it is preyed upon by wading birds and various fish species, including Belonesox belizanus, Petenia splendida, and Rhamdia guatemalensis, depending on the specific location.

Astyanax bacalarensis appears to be a species that readily adapts to its environment. For instance, in a 2019 study, A. bacalarensis was captured from areas where it had not been seen in previous years, which suggests an expanding range. Another example is its introduction to the Mexican locale Laguna Chichancanab, a lake in which it is not normally found; A. bacalarensis can out-compete various native Cyprinodon species therein.

== Conservation status ==
The IUCN considers A. bacalarensis a species of least concern. Its wide native range, adaptable nature, high numbers, and tolerance to variable environmental conditions makes it unlikely to be at risk of extinction. Its relative abundance in several locations serves as part of a biotic index of integrity for streams in the Hondo river basin.

While A. bacalarensis is found spread throughout southern Central America and northern South America, it nonetheless inhabits locations currently facing ecological pressure. Lake Bacalar, for instance, is a tourism hotspot known for its clear waters and unique wildlife, but this tourism can damage natural structures within the lake and introduce pollution. Proposals to label the lake a Ramsar site - a protected wetland habitat - have been unsuccessful in the past; the hotel and tourism sectors were concerned about potential profit impact.
