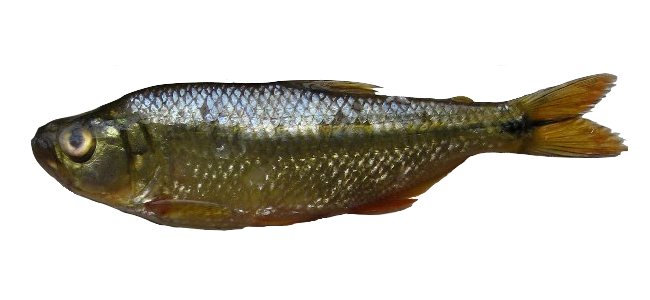
- Preserved specimen

Conservation status
- Data Deficient (IUCN 3.1)

Scientific classification
- Kingdom: Animalia
- Phylum: Chordata
- Class: Actinopterygii
- Division: Teleostei
- Order: Characiformes
- Family: Acestrorhamphidae
- Genus: Astyanax
- Species: A. caballeroi

Binomial name
- Astyanax caballeroi (Contreras-Balderas & Rivera-Tiellery, 1985)

Synonyms
- Bramocharax caballeroi Contreras-Balderas & Rivera-Teillery, 1985

= Astyanax caballeroi =

Species of fish

Astyanax caballeroi is a species of freshwater ray-finned fish belonging to the family Acestrorhamphidae, the American characins. This fish is endemic to a single lake system in Mexico. It has a longer snout and more slender body than most other species in the genus Astyanax, thought to be the result of predatory behavior; while A. caballeroi eats invertebrates and smaller fish, other Astyanax species are more broadly omnivorous, and have deeper bodies with shorter snouts. This difference in body shape once placed A. caballeroi, along with several other species of Astyanax, into the former genus Bramocharax.

Its coloration - a combination of green and silver with black details - is not at all uncommon in species of Astyanax native to Mexico. Its other physical differences, however, allow for easy delineation between related species. For instance, congener Astyanax aeneus is one of the closest relatives of A. caballeroi, despite the disparity in appearance.

== Taxonomy ==
When originally described, A. caballeroi was placed in the now-defunct genus Bramocharax and subgenus Catemaco, known as Bramocharax (Catemaco) caballeroi. Some databases, such as GBIF and the Encyclopedia of Life, still list it under this name. In 2017, Mexican ichthyologist Juan J. Schmitter-Soto redescribed the species as a member of Astyanax; this was the first examination of A. caballeroi in the context of Astyanax rather than Bramocharax, though Bramocharax had already fallen out of use by 2017. Other than its basionym, A. caballeroi has no known synonyms.

Modern ichthyologists largely consider Bramocharax obsolete in favor of Astyanax. Other species formerly in Bramocharax include Astyanax baileyi, Astyanax bransfordii, and Astyanax dorioni. Genetic examination has found that these species are more closely related to other Astyanax species than to each other, indicating that they are a part of Astyanax rather than part of a distinct genus. One 2008 study found that A. caballeroi exhibited genetic similarities to specific populations of Astyanax fasciatus from the Catemaco region of Mexico. (Astyanax fasciatus is also an obsolete name, since split up into multiple other species of Astyanax and several species of Psalidodon.)

The reason for the original differentiation originated in the morphological differences between species. Bramocharax was defined by a long jaw, compressed body, and unicuspid (single-pointed) teeth. Astyanax species are recognizable largely by a deep body, compressed snout, and multicuspid teeth. These differences, however, are now thought to originate in trophic pressures in different regions that necessitated similar adaptations; that is to say, Bramocharax species lived in areas where they faced similar problems, and a more streamlined body shape met those needs more readily than standard Astyanax morphology. If Bramocharax were a legitimate genus, these traits would have been inherited from a shared relationship to a common ancestor. The term "Bramocharax morph" or "Bramocharax-type" is still used to refer to species that have the traits associated with former Bramocharax species.

Astyanax caballeroi is related to congener Astyanax aeneus, with which it lives in sympatry; clear physical characteristics allow for delineation between the two. Despite morphological differences, there is suspicion based upon genetic data that A. caballeroi may be synonymous with A. aeneus, but the possibility exists that they are in the early stages of speciation.

Astyanax caballeroi is known to share elements of its phyletic lineage with congener Astyanax finitimus.

=== Etymology ===
The specific epithet "caballeroi" originates in Mexican biologist Eduardo Caballero (1904-1974), whom the original authors (Contreras-Balderas and Rivera-Teillery) described as "distinguished". The genus name "Astyanax", while less clear in origin, is tied to the Iliad, wherein Astyanax was a Trojan warrior and son of prince Hector. Modern etymologists largely agree that this is due to the type specimen, Astyanax argentatus, which has large scales comparable to armor or a shield. Because the allusion was not made clear in the nominal text, however, this is unconfirmed.

Given its type locality, A. caballeroi is sometimes referred to as the Catemaco characin or Catemaco tetra.

== Description ==
Astyanax caballeroi reaches roughly 13.8 cm (5.4 in) SL (standard length, without the tail fin). It is fusiform - slender-bodied - and has a notably longer and more upturned snout in comparison to other Astyanax species; this is thought to relate to diet. A longer snout is characteristic of species formerly assigned to Bramocharax, but A. caballeroi has a somewhat shorter snout than the others of the same morphotype. The upper profile is slightly concave. There are 10 dorsal-fin rays (9 on rare occasions), 24–29 anal-fin rays (most often 25), and 11–16 pectoral-fin rays. The lateral line consists of 33–37 scales, with an average of 35.

The base scale color is a dull-green, more intense ventrally and more silver towards the belly. There is a dark lateral line down each side, and a single humeral spot shaped like the letter P. The original description noted a similarity in coloration to other Astyanax species from Mexico. The lateral stripe meets a spot of dark pigment on the caudal peduncle, which continues onto the rays of the caudal fin; otherwise, the fins are largely unpigmented, though they may be yellow. Before its current accepted assignment to the genus Astyanax, the humeral spot and caudal spot of A. caballeroi drew comparisons to other Astyanax species, in which these are common features.

Juvenile specimens of A. caballeroi have been noted to bear a strong resemblance to juveniles of Astyanax mexicanus, though this is resolved with age. Several similarities between the two species also appear in skull osteology.

=== Sexual dimorphism ===
Astyanax caballeroi demonstrates a sexually-dimorphic trait referred to as nuptial tubercles, wherein small, fleshy protrusions appear on the rays of the anal and pelvic fins of mature males. This is a trait not uncommon in Astyanax as a whole, though some species grow bony hooks instead. In A. caballeroi, these tubercles are simple (in one piece), as opposed to bifid (split in two).

== Distribution and ecology ==
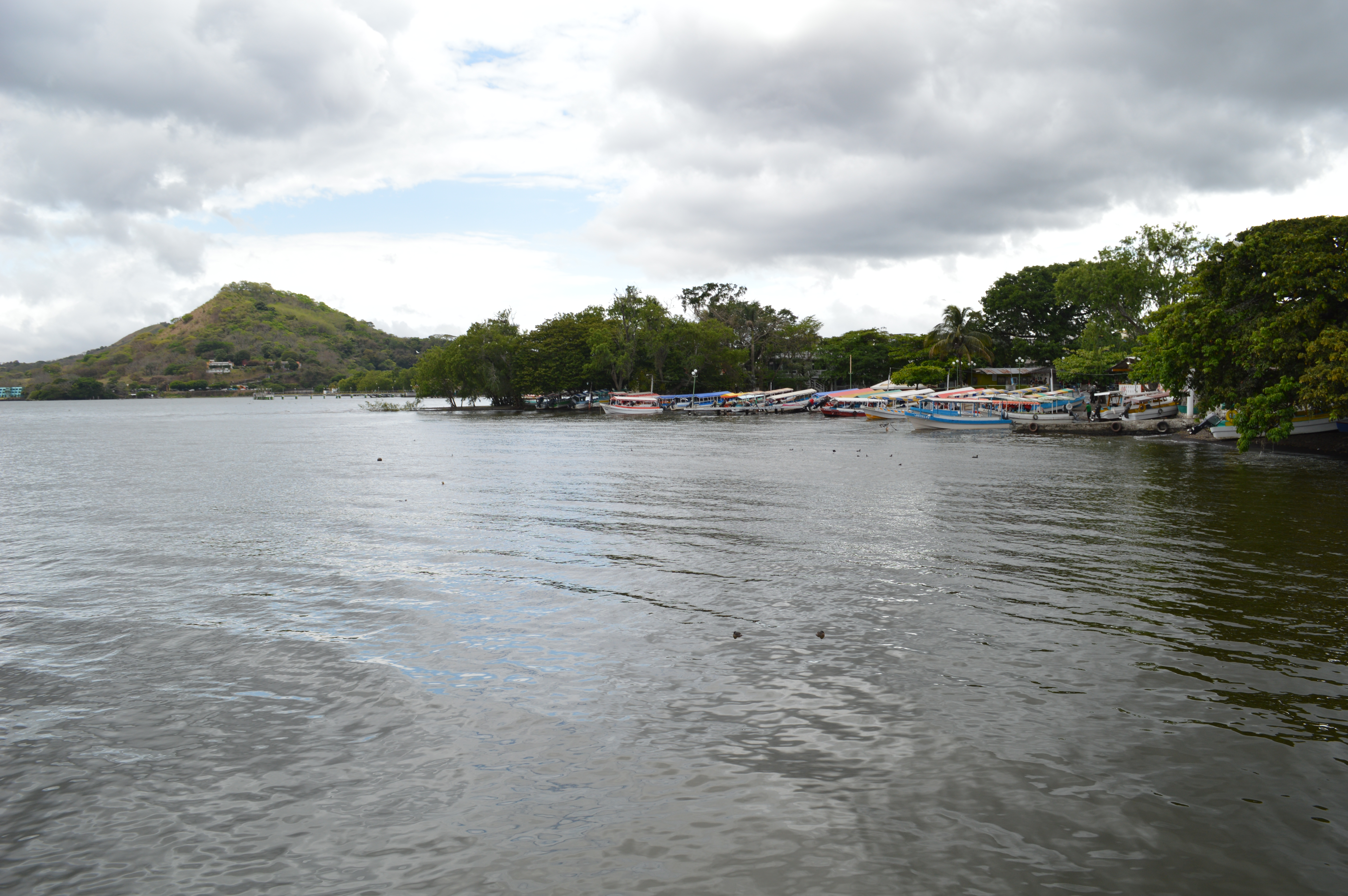
Fishing boats docked on the shore of Lake Catemaco.

Astyanax caballeroi is endemic to Lake Catemaco and several surrounding rivers in Veracruz, Mexico. The region is one of the most humid in the country, and has high temperatures, up to 38 °C (100 °F); the lake itself is situated 332 m (1,089 ft) above sea level. A. caballeroi is known to be abundant therein, and has been collected alongside species from the genera Xiphophorus, Poecilia, Dorosoma, and Heterandria.

The diet of A. caballeroi consists largely of invertebrates and detritus from other fish, with supplemental plant material. It is also known to demonstrate piscivory; predatory behavior (of fish and invertebrates) is thought to be responsible for the more slender body and longer snout of former Bramocharax species.

== Conservation status ==
Astyanax caballeroi is considered a data deficient species by the IUCN; more knowledge about distribution and population is needed before a more detailed status can be determined. Currently, known threats include sediment deposition as a result of riparian zone destruction, pollution from nearby human populations, and pollution from agricultural activities. Nonetheless, the population is believed to be stable, and A. caballeroi is known to occur within the protected Los Tuxtlas Biosphere Reserve.
