= Water resources management in Honduras =

- Withdrawals by sector 2000: Domestic: 8%; Agriculture: 80%; Industry: 10%
- Renewable water resources: 95.9 km^{3}
- Surface water produced internally: 86.9 km^{3}
- Groundwater recharge: 39 km^{3}
- Overlap shared by surface water and groundwater: 30 km^{3}
- Renewable water resources per capita: 13,766 m^{3}/year
- Wetland designated as Ramsar sites: 223,320 ha
- Hydropower generation: 33%

Water resources management (WRM) in Honduras is a work in progress and at times has advanced; however, unstable investment and political climates, strong weather phenomena, poverty, lack of adequate capacity, and deficient infrastructures have and will continue to challenge developments to water resource management. The State of Honduras is working on a new General Water Law to replace the 1927 Law on Using National Waters and designed to regulate water use and management. The new water law will also create a Water Authority, and the National Council of Water Resources which will serve as an advising and consultative body.

Initiatives such as the new 2009 General Water Law and The Water Framework Law (2003) along with international monetary and technical assistance and an increasing global focus on integrated water resources management (IWRM) provide hope that Honduras will be able to protect and manage well, their water resources.

Honduras has abundant water resources as the country is located in the tropics but there in lies another major challenge, Honduras must constantly prepare for and recover from frequent heavy storms and flooding. This became all too evident in 1998 when Hurricane Mitch made land fall on Honduras killing 7,000 people.

Surface water drains into Honduras' two primary drainage basins; the Atlantic sloping basin representing 82% of the country, and the Pacific sloping basin accounting for the remaining 13% of Honduras. Together, these two basins drain 106,714 km2 per year. Honduras has ample water availability with annual renewable water resources at 13,766 m^{3} per capital well above the world per capita average of 8,467 m^{3} per year or other Latin American countries at 6,739 m^{3} per year.

== Water management history and recent developments ==
Of a historical note, research and subsequent literature of Water Resources Management in Honduras from the Late Classic period (A.D. 600-900) in Copán, a water-rich region of western Honduras, have suggested that lagoons located in Copán's urban residential sectors may have been conceptualized, utilized, and maintained by the inhabitants of surrounding domestic groups. These lagoons, thought to be forms of communal property, created an economic and ideological basis for social integration. Because the lagoons were seen as a shared communal resource, it was difficult for community elites and power brokers to centralize power and monopolize water resources. Presumably, management of water resources continued to evolve among these native communities until the Spanish conquest. Honduras later declared independence from Spain in 1821; however, information regarding water resource management until 1927 has not been located for this overview.

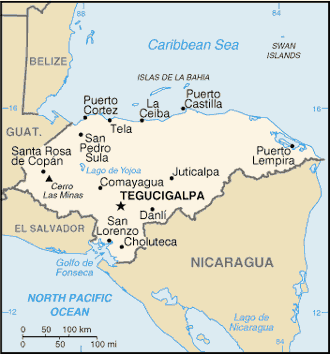
A map of Honduras.

Early 20th century developments in Honduran water resources management were in some ways a response to an expanding export market for bananas during the twenties. The need for irrigation within Honduras' banana farming operations became important for economic development. These irrigated banana fields were located in the fertile valleys of Sula, Aguán y La Ceiba along the Atlantic coast. And today, irrigation is still very important for the agriculture sector of Honduras as it provides for internal consumption and seeks to amplify exports in non-traditional crops.

In 1927, the Law on Using National Waters (Ley Vigente de Aprovechamiento de Aguas Nacionales) was passed to approve measures addressing water use, irrigation, industrial use, and hydropower. Furthermore, the 1927 law marked the beginning of policy measures designed specifically to manage water resources—albeit not yet integrating sectoral policies. Around 1957, Honduras was mostly under military rule until a freely elected government came to power in 1982. It is unclear how military rule sought to manage water resources during this period. The next major water resources policy measures were signed in 2003 as the Water Framework Law which, among many aspects, aims to reduce poverty through better water resources management. In August 2009, a new General Water Law was passed to replace the 1927 water law. Within the new water law a National Water Authority was created to oversee the work of sector institutions.

In spite of ongoing efforts to improve water resources management in Honduras, many challenges continue to exist such as insufficient employment generation, unfavorable investment climate, overvalued currency, lack of credit, high commercial interest rates, deficient infrastructure (water delivery, electricity, communications, and roads), weak legal institutions, inadequate education and workforce productivity, burdensome bureaucratic obstacles, and an unstable political climate. As Honduras and the international community work together to address these hurdles, Honduras will improve water supplies, quality of water, efficiency in irrigation, important freshwater wildlife habitats, and reduce annual flood damage.

== Water resource base ==
=== Surface and groundwater resources ===
Honduras is divided into two large drainage basins each consisting of watersheds and rivers that drain towards the oceans. The Atlantic sloping side of Honduras is home to 13 watersheds including Honduras' largest rivers by volume such as the Río Patuca, Río Ulua, and Río Aguan. Together, the watersheds and rivers on the "Atlantic slope" account for 87% of the country's surface water runoff.

The "Pacific slope" side of Honduras has five major watersheds. The important rivers on the Pacific side of the country include the Rió Choluteca which supplies water to the capital city of Tegucigalpa, and the Rió Lempa. All together, the rivers on the Pacific slope convey the other 13% of surface water runoff in Honduras. Total surface water runoff is estimated to be 87 km^{3} per year with 16% of this water leaving Honduras for neighboring countries of El Salvador, Nicaragua, and Guatemala.

Choluteca River
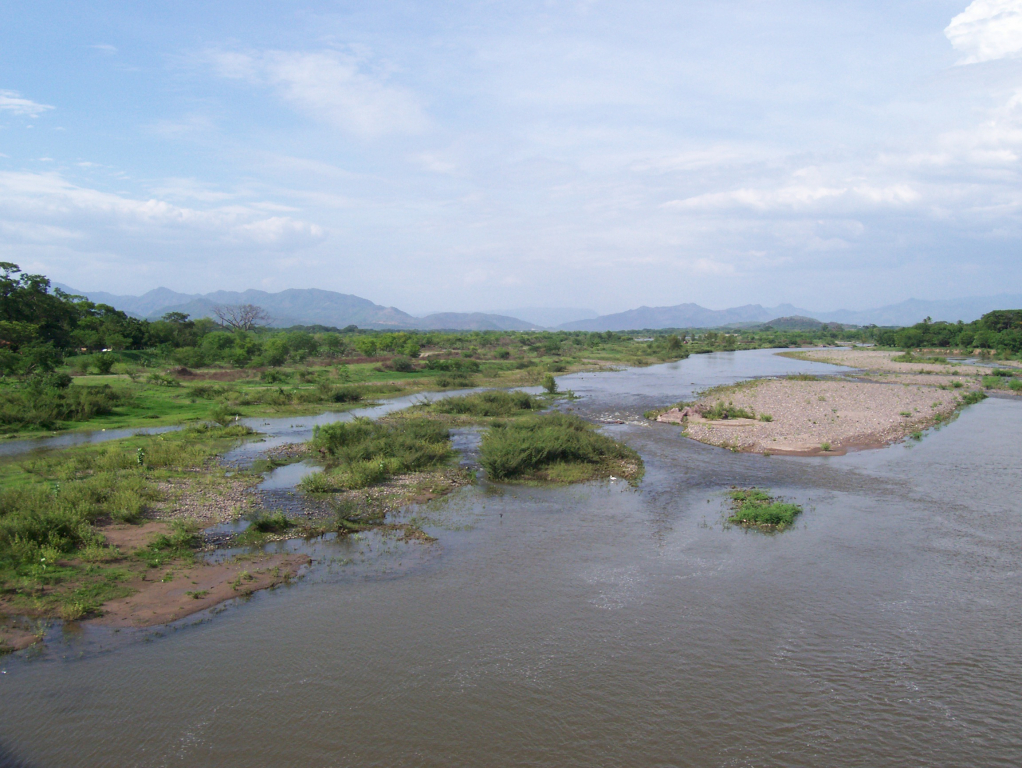
- Choluteca River near the city of Choluteca

Location
- Country: Honduras

Physical characteristics
- Length: 349 km (217 mi)
- Basin size: 7,681 km^{2} (2,966 sq mi)

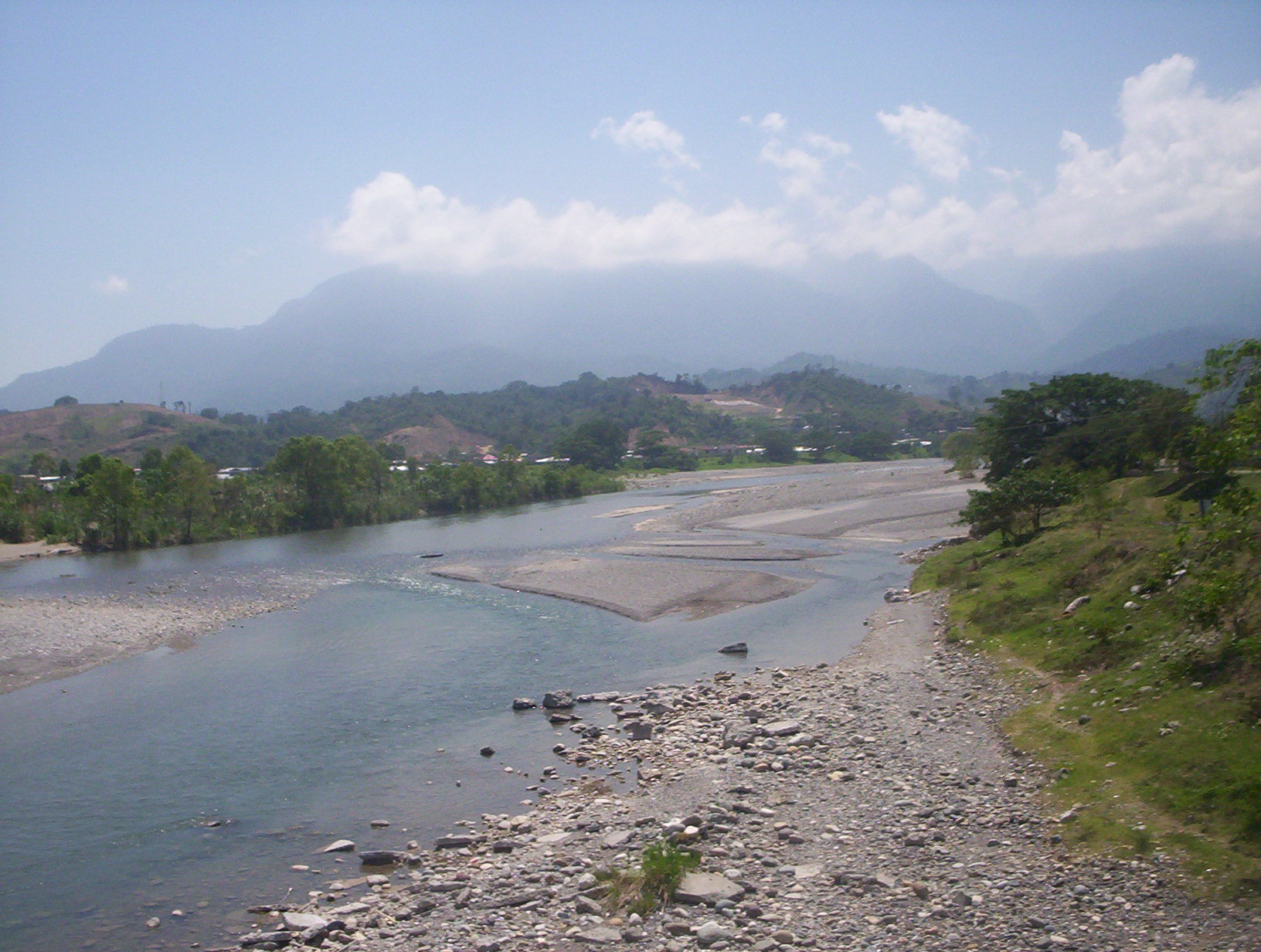
The Río Cangrejal in La Ceiba.

River Basin	Area (km^{2})	Volume (10^{6} m^{3}/year)
Atlantic sloping watershed	88,034	75,397
Río Motagua	2,141.2	2,072
Río Chamelecón	4,399.3	3,264
Río Ulua	21,230.6	16,959
Río Lean	2,161	Included in Cangrejal
Río Cangrejal	1,255	271
Río Cangrejal-Aguan	1,179	Included in Cangrejal
Río Aguan	10,386.1	7,329
Río Sico	7,090.8	5,908
Río Plátano	1,248.3	3,225
Río Patuca	24,762.4	23,706
Río Guarunta	5,561.0	Included in Kruta
Río Kruta	1,314	7,109
Río Segovia	5,305.2	5,554

River Basin	Area (km^{2})	Volume (10^{6} m^{3}/year)
Pacific sloping watershed	18,680	11,527
Río Lempa	5,717	3 872
Río Goascorán	1,576.6	1,200
Río Nacaome	2,745.1	2,061
Río Choluteca	7,681.6	3,032
Río Negro/Río Sampile	959.5	1,362

River Basin	Area (km^{2})	Volume (10^{6} m^{3}/year)
Total from Pacific and Atlantic	106,714	86,924

Source for tables above: FAO 2000

Groundwater availability is not precise in Honduras, however, wells located in the lowlands of the Atlantic coast historically have good yields and are able to sustainably supplement water needs there. In 1973, CEPAL (La Comisión Económica para América Latina), estimated that 9.09 km^{3} of renewable groundwater could be sustainably exploited for use.

Most of this water (8.02 km^{3} per year) recharges groundwater on the Atlantic drainage basin of Honduras while the smaller Pacific side basin is recharged by an annual 1.07 km^{3} of water flowing towards the Pacific. Groundwater use has been important in the valleys of interior highlands such as Choluteca, Tegucigalpa, and Comayagua where agriculture and irrigation are important to local economies; however, groundwater resources are in significant decline and availability of groundwater for irrigation has subsequently been adversely affected.

=== Water quality ===
Water pollution to both surface and groundwater is primarily due to agricultural run-off and untreated effluents from mining activities. Honduras produces coffee for export along the Atlantic coast and many of the pesticides used become toxic effluents that contaminate rivers and seep into groundwater tables. Heavy metals that escape from mining operations along the Gulf of Fonseca have become a problem and untreated wastewater originating from large towns and cities has often been discharged into nearby waterways, especially in the case of Lake Yojoa. As of 2000, there were no systematic records of pollution levels in lakes, rivers, and reservoirs.

=== Natural and artificial storage capacity ===
Lake Yojoa Lago de Yojoa
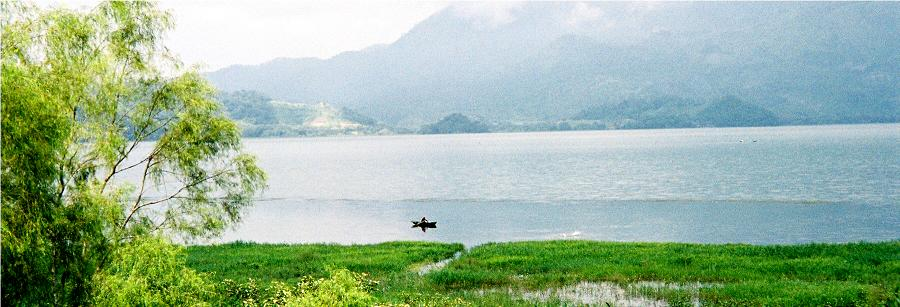

- Location within Honduras Location within Central America
- Coordinates: 14°52′N 87°59′W
- Basin countries: Honduras
- Surface area: 90 km^{2} (35 sq mi)
- Average depth: 15 m (49 ft)
- Surface elevation: c. 700 m (2,300 ft)

Apart from numerous small lakes, Honduras counts Lake Yojoa as its largest natural lake and is nationally significant for its fish resources and the surrounding diversity of flora and fauna that it supports. Lake Yojoa is important for drinking water and irrigation of fruits, grains, and vegetables as well.

Yojoa has an approximate surface area 90 km^{2}. In addition to Yojoa, there are five dams and reservoirs with the purposes of storing water for consumer consumption, irrigation, and hydroelectric power operations. These dams regulate the flow of 4.21 km^{3}. The largest of the reservoirs is the El Cajon with a surface area of 94 km^{2}, slightly larger than Lake Yojoa. Total capacity of the El Cajon reservoir is 5600 million m^{3} (BCM).

== Water resources management by sector ==
=== Potable water and sanitation ===
Data on water and sanitation in Honduras varies by resource as already pointed out in Water supply and sanitation in Honduras, however WHO/UNICEF reported in 2006 that sanitation coverage was 69% (broadly defined) with a substantial majority proportion being located in urban settings. Water system coverage was 87% (also broadly defined) with a small majority of this being urban. Water For People works in Honduras and they report water service in rural areas is ~44%. Furthermore, much of this water is not properly disinfected posing serious health risks from water-borne diseases.

=== Irrigation and drainage ===
The General Directorate of Water Resources (La Dirección General de Recursos Hídricos (DGRH) is responsible for the development, operation, and maintenance of irrigation systems. Honduras could potentially irrigate 500,000 ha of agricultural land; however, as of 2000, only 73,000 ha were under irrigation. About 56,000 ha of the irrigated land is held in private arrangements of which about 47,000 ha is actually being watered. The remaining 17,000 ha is publicly held land. The move to privatization began in the 1990s when the Honduran government adopted a policy of privatization and decentralization that included an eventual transfer of irrigation systems to users.

These irrigation system transfers are not being eagerly adopted as farmers have a high preference towards privatization and do not want the added responsibility of system maintenance. The Cortes, Yoro, and Choluteca provinces are the most developed representing ~50,000 ha of irrigated area. In response to the continuous increase in water utilization, a "25-year master plan" is being promoted by the Honduran government for both irrigation and drainage with total investment of US$143 million.

Drainage in Honduras is of utmost importance to the health of citizens, livestock, and agriculture. Geographically situated in the tropics, Honduras receives large totals of rain from powerful storms and hurricanes, and flooding is an important concern. This constant flooding prompted a 1973 program to build canals and aqueducts in an effort to control flood waters and recuperate agricultural land. Figures from 1991 show that construction of canals to convey floodwater away from valuable land have recuperated 42,000 ha in the Sula Valley and 20,00 ha in the Aguán Valley. Drainage problems in Honduras are most prevalent in the Patuca, Aguán, Plátano, Ulúa, and Chamelecón river basins and cover approximately 340,000 ha.

=== Hydropower ===
Installed capacity of electricity generation in Honduras ~1,500 MW, while hydroelectric output accounts for about 500 MW (33%) of total output. There is large potential for hydropower generation amounting to about 5,000 MW. This growth in hydropower potential resulted from the efforts of former president, Ricardo Mauduro, whom set up a Special Commission for the Development of Hydroelectric Projects.

Notable hydroelectric plants in Honduras include: El Níspero (22.5 MW), Cañaveral (28.5 MW), Río Lindo (80 MW), and El Cajón (300 MW). There are 16 hydro projects that should be commissioned by 2011 and will provide an output of 206.5 MW. Some of the notable projects include: Cangrejal (40 MW), Patuca 3 (100 MW), Los Llanitos (50 MW), and the Jicatuyo (170 MW). El Cajon, as of 2001, was the largest civil engineering project ever undertaken and produced between 45 and 50 percent of the consumed electricity (650-700 kW in 2000) within Honduras.

== Water pricing ==
Jon Strand, professor of economics at the University of Oslo in Norway, released a paper in 1998 on water pricing in Honduras and its capital city of Tegucigalpa. Professor Strand then presented the paper's thesis and findings at a World Bank workshop on water pricing implementation, in Washington D.C. Strand's central argument also takes issue with low water tariffs in Honduras and primarily Tegucigalpa.

Strand writes, "A key problem is water pricing policy, whereby the price charged of those households with access to piped water is only about 20% of long-run marginal cost (LRMC) of supplying this water". The report also discusses in detail other consequences of low prices in Honduras such as: 1)adverse distributional consequences where the poor pay more than the affluent; 2)leading to wasteful water use among those with access; 3)low revenues for the water administration implies that its ability and incentives to improve and maintain the water system is low.

=== Water laws ===
Water Framework Law (Ley Marco Del Sector Agua Potable Y Saneamiento) and decree No. 118 of 2003 constitutes a jurisdictional framework for planning and organizing the management and integrated use of national water resources. A notable strategy of the framework is to reduce poverty through proper management of water resources and by promoting sustainable development. The framework also decentralized management of water away from SANNA to the municipalities.

The new General Water Law, (la Ley General de Aguas) was approved by the Honduran Congress on August 18, 2009 and will replace the 1927 Law on Using National Waters discussed below. There are a total of 101 articles in the law and the newly created National Water Authority (Autoridad Nacional de Agua) was the principal decision by legislators. This decentralized water authority will replace the Directorate General of Water Resources, a unit of the Secretariat of Natural Resources (SERNA).

The now replaced Law on Using National Waters (Ley Vigente de Aprovechamiento de Aguas Nacionales) was first approved in 1927 and later modified in 1932 and 1945. This water use law enacted special rules in the use of potable and domestic use water, irrigation, navigation, industrial use, fishing, and hydropower. This law also provided for water ownership and use. No special provisions for groundwater were made under this law. Chapter 8 of the 1927 law outlines in fifteen articles how the water of a Honduras shall be used for irrigation. Special note to irrigation is also made in Chapter 3, Art. 10, and Chapter 5, Art. 25 which lists an order of preference for how national waters should be used. Irrigation is listed third after domestic and railway supply respectively.

General Law of the Environment (Reglamento General del Ambiente) or decree No. 104 of 1993. Article 32 names the Public Health Secretary, National Defense of natural resources, and public security responsible for control of illegal sewage dumping on inland waters. Article 74, with special focus on clean water, guaranties a safe and appropriate environment for the population.

=== Institutional framework ===
SERNA (La Secretaría de Recursos Naturales y Ambiente) – SERNA, the Ministry of Natural Resources and Environment is charged with responsibly utilizing water resources and sectoral management of water resources. SERNA oversees DGRH and CESCCO (both described below).

- The General Directorate of Water Resources (La Dirección General de Recursos Hídricos (DGRH)), a former unit of SERNA, was charged with the development, operation, and maintenance of irrigation systems. DGRH also mapped water use concessions and follows up on hydrological data.
- The Center for Contaminant Control (Centro de Estudios y Control de Contaminantes (CESCCO) studies water quality.

The newly created National Water Authority, (Autoridad Nacional de Agua) replaces the General Directorate of Water Resources and will oversee separate institutions responsible for the administration of water resources, regulating their use, water distribution development, conservation, and maintenance. One objective of the new decentralized separation of institutions is to avoid administrative and sectoral conflicts between the institutions themselves.

AJAMs (Asociaciones de Juntas de Agua Municipales) AJAMs are municipal association of boards representing rural communities. The national association of these local boards is the AHJASA (La Asociación Hondureña de Juntas Administradoras de Agua) or The Honduran Association of Water Board Administrators. Membership is made up from 8 departments and includes 500 members that represent 380,000 users. About 50 AJAMs exist throughout Honduran municipalities.

The Honduras water platform (Plataforma del Agua de Honduras) is a group jointly formed by civil society, the international community and the central government. Its fundamental purpose is to promote integrated water resources management in Honduras. This type of management promotes administration of water, its land and related resources, so as to maximize social and economic well-bring. Ideally, this is done in an equitable way without compromising the sustainability of the ecosystems.

RAS-HON (La Red de Agua y Saneamiento de Honduras)- This network aims to improve communication between and among institutions, share best practices and experiences, and promote appropriate technologies. The network is made up of members of social society and the government.

SANAA (Servicio Autonomo Nacional de Acueductos y Alcantarillados) – SANAA is the country's national utility for moving water and providing drainage and sewage systems. SANNA is responsible for the operation of about half of the country's urban water and sewage systems including that of Tegucigalpa. In 2003, a new Framework Law for water supply and sanitation was passed that included service decentralization from SANAA to the municipalities.

CONASA (Consejo Nacional de Agua Potable y Saneamiento) – CONASA is the national advisory council office of SANAA on potable water and sanitation. A major component of the CONASA mission is to set national policy, strategies, and plans regarding coverage of water services.

ERSAPS (Ente Regulador de los Servicios de Agua Potable y Saneamiento) – ERSAPS serves as the regulator of water and sanitation services.

FHIS (El Fondo Hondureño de Inversión Social) – FHIS channels a large proportion of the funding from national funds and donors for water projects.

== International agreements ==
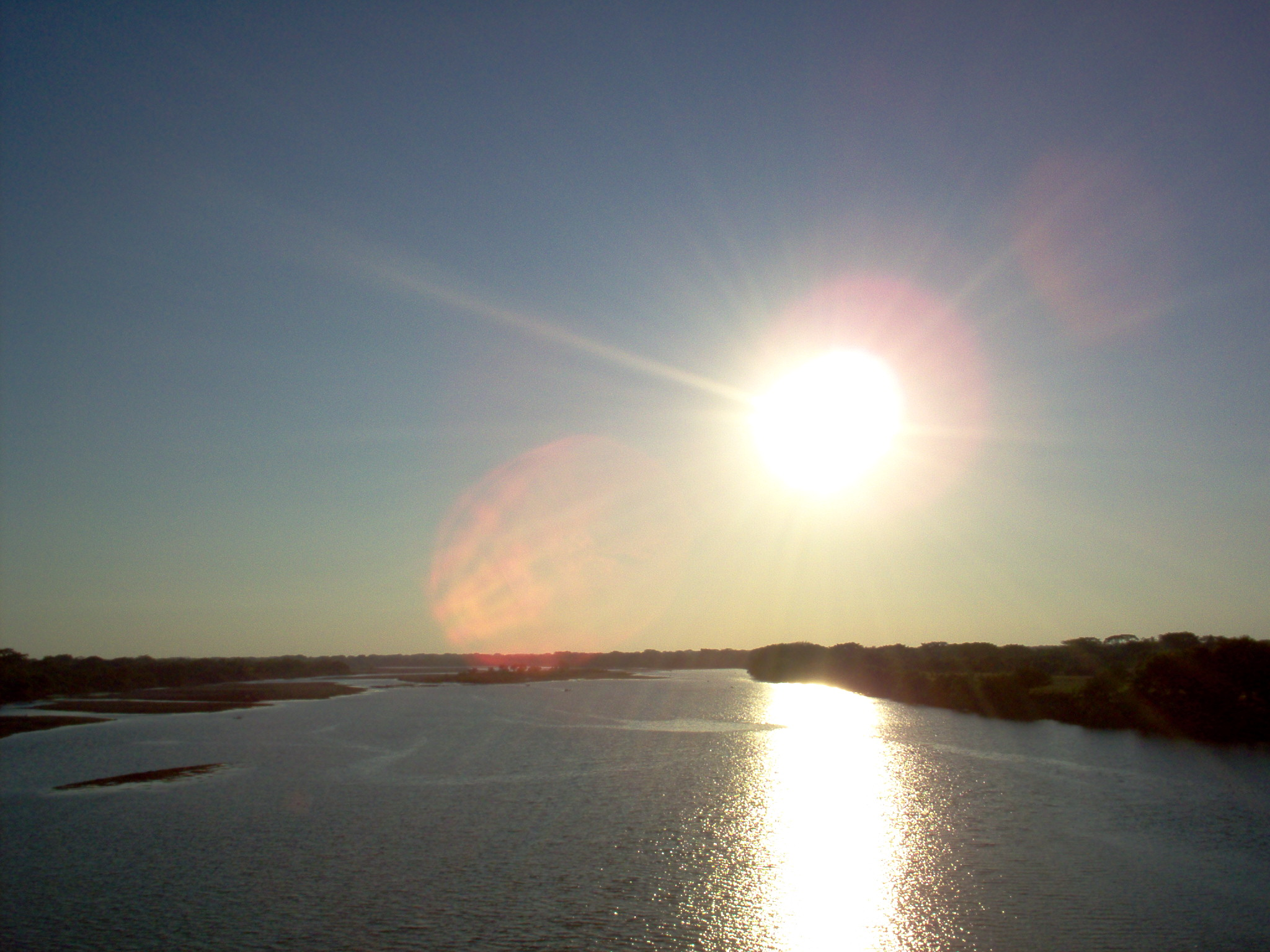
Sunset over the Lempa river

Honduras shares rivers and watersheds with its neighbors and 16% of the surface water in Honduras leaves the country by river towards El Salvador, Guatemala, and Nicaragua. For Example, the Río Lempa (3.87 km^{3}) and the Río Goascorán (1.2 km^{3}) together convey 5.07 km^{3} of water per year to El Salvador. No international agreements exist with the aforementioned countries to regulate the joint utilization and management of shared water resources. There exists only treaties marking geographical limits that do not take into consideration shared water resources.

== Environmental issues ==
=== Protected areas ===
Along with the Ramsar sites below, UNESCO recognizes the Maya Site of Copan and the Río Plátano Biosphere Reserve as World Heritage Sites. These protected areas offer ecosystem services such as protection from floods, and natural water purification. Deforestation, poor water resource management and climate change may all factor into the future health of these protected areas.

Ramsar sites in Honduras:

1. Barras de Cuero y Salado – 13,225 ha;
2. Laguna de Bacalar (Honduras) – 7,394 ha;
3. Parque Nacional Jeanette Kawas – 78,150 ha;
4. Refugio de Vida Silvestre Punta Izopo – 11,200 ha;
5. Sistema de Humedales de la Zona Sur de Honduras in Tegucigalpa – 69,711 ha;
6. Subcuenca del Lago de Yojoa – 43,640 ha.

Source: Ramsar 2005.

=== Potential climate change impacts ===
The Global Climate Risk Index 4 constructed for the period between 1997 and 2006 and covering both human and economic impacts, ranks Honduras 1st in the world, underscoring the country's very high vulnerability to climate related events, mostly to storms. This vulnerability was evident when Hurricane Mitch struck Honduras in 1998 causing $4 billion in damage and claiming 7,000 lives. Yet climate change is expected to bring even greater weather variability to Honduras with less precipitation overall but more powerful storms and heavy rain during hurricane season spawning landslides and floods. Tegucigalpa and neighboring Comayagüela (which together form the Honduran capital) are the most affected, due to deforestation and the increased vulnerability to landslides.

According to the first national communication to the United Nations Framework Convention on Climate Change, the following future impacts from climate change are expected in Honduras: 1) Temperature increases will occur that may alter precipitation patterns and irrigation schedules with the highest temperature increases in May and June. 2) Reduction in precipitation totals with the largest reductions occurring between November and April.

Source: World Bank Climate Change country note on Honduras.

=== Erosion ===
In an effort to increase exports under global demand for wood, Honduras has cut down forest at an increasing rate and by 1996, annual deforestation was at 108,000 ha. About 170,000 ha of land in Honduras are subject to soil erosion. Without forest in place, rains have eroded large areas of land and rivers are carrying valuable topsoil downstream. Where dams are built, they have begun to silt up with the possible effect of reducing their hydroelectric potential.

== External assistance ==
=== Multilateral cooperation ===
In 2007, The World Bank approved a US$30 million loan for the Water and Sanitation Sector Modernization Project in Honduras. Relevant water resource management objectives include: 1) Reinforce the national sector actors to fulfill their new roles as a necessity for successful decentralization of the services; and 2) Reduce non-revenue water in selected areas of Tegucigalpa to provide immediate impact on the service quality. Jane Armitage, World Bank Director for Central America, says,"The Water and Sanitation Sector Modernization Project will not only enable an environment that develops and strengthens service providers, but also will foster transparency and improve their effectiveness in the water sector".

The Inter-American Development Bank (IDB) also approved a 40-year US$30 million loan to Honduras in 2006 that is now ('09) in implementation phases. The soft loan targets improvements in potable water and supports decentralization, improved service management and finance infrastructures. The program also finances studies for transferring Tegucigalpa's potable water, currently managed by SANAA, to the Municipality of the Central District of Tegucigalpa. Most of the resources from this IDB loan are being used to finance expansion of potable water.

A US$4.6 million grant by the International Finance Corporation (IFC) and the Dutch government is benefiting 40,000 low-income households in rural and urban areas of Honduras by improving the financing of water and wastewater infrastructure projects.

At the initiative of the United Nations Development Program's country office in Honduras, the Honduran Water Platform (HWP) was established in 2003 with the aim of implementing more suitable management of the country's water resources. This led to the 2004 collaboration of the Geological Survey of Denmark and Greenland (GEUS) with the Kvistgaard Consult. Together, these two entities carried out a project that supported the Honduran Water Platform (HWP) in its preparation of a water resource strategy and action plan.

=== Bilateral cooperation ===
Support by Canada and a project from the United States with USAID are selected and summarized here.

The Canadian International Development Agency is supporting the Honduran water sector in the following avenues:

1. PASOS water project by CARE International (2006–2011) with a project cost of US$15 million is opening sustainable access to potable water in the Northern coast, strengthening local government mechanisms that are providing services and protections to local watersheds;
2. UNICEF with financing from Canada is working to improve water quality and basic hygiene habits, advocate for those with low coverage of safe water, and help prepare for future water emergencies. The project is being implemented in 40 municipalities and 15 neighborhoods in the capital of Tegucigalpa;
3. Canada is planning three new projects with a focus on river basin management for the Choluteca, Nacaome, Lancetilla/Bañaderos, Tocoa and Mejocote Rivers; 4) Canada assisted in the aftermath of Hurricane Mitch in 1998 to repair water service and recently, Canada has come to the aid of Honduras after tropical depression 16 in 2008.

Sources:

- SERNA 2007
- Canadian International Development Agency (CIDA) 2007

USAID has implemented a four-year, US$23 million program called MIRA (Manejo Integrado de Recursos Ambientales) or Integrated Management of Environmental Resources. MIRA is aimed at strengthening the local capacity to create and administer watershed management plans. The program will also stimulate policy reform related to the integrated management of natural resources. MIRA promotes stakeholder dialogues that involve local authorities, private businesses, other donors, NGOs, and the beneficiary communities. The objective here is of building consensus on the vision and priorities needed to achieve that vision. USAID/MIRA is working in 12 out of the 21 watersheds in Honduras. Four of these watersheds (Choluteca, Cangrejal, Patuca and the Bay Islands) had been previously designated by USAID as priority watersheds. An additional eight watersheds were selected based upon bio-physical, socio-economic and institutional criteria.

== See also ==
- Water management in greater Tegucigalpa
