= Water supply and sanitation in Honduras =

Data
- Access to an improved water source: 87% (2010)
- Access to improved sanitation: 77% (2010)
- Share of collected wastewater treated: Very low
- Continuity of supply: 2%
- Average urban water use (L/person/day): 300-400
- Average urban water and sanitation tariff (US$/m^{3}): 3 US$/month (2000 in Tegucigalpa)
- Share of household metering: Low

Institutions
- Decentralization to municipalities: Partial, in the process of being completed
- National water and sanitation company: SANAA (in the process of being dismantled)
- Water and sanitation regulator: ERSAPS
- Responsibility for policy setting: CONASA, a Council under the Ministry of Health
- Sector law: Yes (2003)
- No. of urban service providers: About 20 (TBC)
- No. of rural service providers: 5,000

Drinking water supply and sanitation coverage in Honduras has increased significantly in the last decades. However, the sector is still characterized by poor service quality and poor efficiency in many places. Coverage gaps still remain, particularly in rural areas.

In 2003, a new framework law for water supply and sanitation was passed. It includes service decentralization from the national utility, SANAA, to the municipalities. It also creates a policy council and a regulatory agency. Nevertheless, the new institutions remain weak and the process of decentralization has been slow. Furthermore, there is no policy of sector financing.

== Access ==
In 2015, 91% of the total population had access to "improved" water, 97% and 84%, in urban and rural areas, respectively. Leaving out 738 thousand people. Regarding sanitation, 83% of the total population had access to "improved" sanitation, 87% and 78%, in urban and rural areas, respectively. Excluding around 1.5 million people.

Data about access to water supply and sanitation in Honduras vary depending on the source of information. For example, according to a survey in 2006, 81% of houses had access to an improved water source and 86% had access to sanitation. The sanitation figures are much higher than the 2010 information from the WHO Joint Monitoring Programme for Water Supply and Sanitation shown in the following table.

		Urban (52% of the population)	Rural (48% of the population)	Total
Water	Improved water source	95%	79%	87%
Water	Piped on Premises	95%	74%	85%
Sanitation	Improved sanitation	85%	69%	77%
Sanitation	Sewerage (2006 JMP survey & census data)	66%	11%	36%

Source: WHO/UNICEF Joint Monitoring Programme for Water Supply and Sanitation (JMP)

== Service quality ==
The service quality in Honduras is low compared to other countries in Latin America. In 2006, 75% of the drinking water in urban areas was disinfected and 10% of collected wastewater received treatment. In rural areas, it was estimated that one-third of the systems provided continual service and less than 14% of the systems delivered disinfected water in 2004.

According to the WHO, in 2000 98% of Honduran water systems provided water on an intermittent basis, for an average duration of 6 hours a day. In 51% of urban water systems was drinking water disinfected, and only 3% of collected wastewater was treated.

== Water resources ==
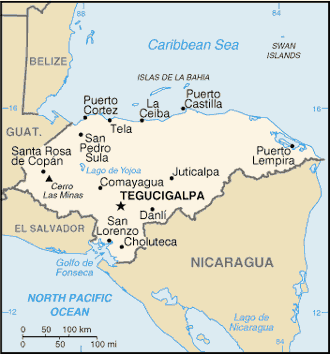
A map of Honduras.

The country has water resources for a water potential of 1,542 m^{3}/s, but in 2006 only 88.5 m^{3}/s (6%) were used for consumption, whereof 75 m^{3}/s was used for irrigation and 13.5 m^{3}/s for domestic and industrial use. There are high levels of pollution. The 4,300 rural water supply systems extract their water from the following sources:

Source	Percentage
Springs	57%
Brooks	34%
Rivers	5%
Groundwater	4%

Water supply systems which use gravity correspond to 93% of all constructed systems. Mixed and pump using systems correspond to 4.5%. The scattered rural population intensely depends on about 15,000 dug wells. A general water law is proposed to ameliorate the management of water resources.

== Water use ==
Per capita water use in Honduras varies greatly from one locality to another. In Tegucigalpa – which suffers from chronic problems of water supply – it is 172 liter/capita/day, while it is 545 liter/capita/day in small municipal systems. In small towns water use thus is much higher than it is for example in Central Europe, where it stands at 135–200 liter/capita/day.

== History of the sector ==
In 1998 the country was devastated by Hurricane Mitch, which destroyed many rural water supply systems. Subsequently, the external assistance provided to Honduras increased substantially to assist in the reconstruction effort.

In 2003 the National Assembly approved the water framework Law, under which SANAA will transfer its service provision functions to the concerned municipalities until 2008 and transform itself into an agency that provides technical assistance to municipalities and juntas. The new sector structure foreseen by the law is still being established. The new institutions are still weak and new institutions are still adapting to their new roles.

In 2006 the government issued a strategic plan for the modernization of the water sector and strengthen the decentralization of services. In 2012 the government announced that the responsibility for water supply and sanitation in Tegucigalpa would be handed over from SANAA to a municipal company to be called Aguas de San Miguel. A civil society group called Citizens' Front for Water (FCA) would participate in the management of the company.

== Responsibility for water supply and sanitation ==
=== Policy and regulation ===
According to the 2003 Water Framework Law sector policies are defined by the Consejo Nacional de Agua Potable y Saneamiento (CONASA) or National Water and Sanitation Council, which is chaired by the Minister of Health. Regulation is the responsibility of the Ente Regulador de los Servicios de Agua Potable y Saneamiento (ERSAPS) or Potable Water and Sanitation Regulatory Agency.

Before the Water Framework Law was adopted, there was no regulatory framework that could have been applied in decentralizing processes such as the developments in San Pedro Sula and Puerto Cortés. Thus, local regulatory agencies were created for the concession contracts to secure a sustained process. For instance, in Puerto Cortés a regulatory agency was created at the municipal level including selected representatives of civil society, such as doctors, engineers and lawyers.

=== Service provision ===
Water and sanitation service provision in Honduras is the responsibility of the following institutions:

- Municipalities in most urban areas
- A private utility under concession by the municipality of San Pedro Sula
- The Servicio Autónomo Nacional de Acueductos y Alcantarillados (SANAA) or National Autonomous Water and Sewerage Service, which operates approximately half of the urban water supply and sanitation systems of Honduras, including Tegucigalpa
- About 5,000 water boards (Juntas Administradoras de Agua – JAA) in rural areas and in marginal peri-urban areas

According to the Water Framework Law which passed in 2003, SANAA will have to transfer management to the municipalities until 2008.

All urban water supply and sanitation systems are public, except three: In San Pedro Sula, the municipality has given a concession to a private operator for 30 years in 2000. In Puerto Cortés, the same happened in 1999, in Choloma, governments created mixed utilities.

==== The case of Puerto Cortes ====
In Puerto Cortés the water and sewer system had been managed by the national public water and sewer company SANAA. The municipality requested the transfer of the system after the city remained without drinking water for months in the aftermath of Hurricane Gert which hit the city in September 1993. After a lengthy period of negotiations the system was finally transferred in 1997. During that period USAID provided substantial financial assistance to modernize and expand the water system, doubling access between 1993 and 1997 and improving service quality. As a consequence the incidence of waterborne diseases such as diarrhea declined significantly.

Despite an upcoming election the city's mayor, Marlon Lara who had become mayor in January 1994, more than doubled water tariffs, had non-paying users disconnected and had water meters installed. Although many voters resented the measures, Marlon Lara managed to win the elections. Shortly afterwards, in 1999, the city decided to create a mixed company called Aguas de Puerto Cortés (APS) in order to reduce the potential for political interference in day-to-day management.

Initially 95% of the company was owned by the municipality, with symbolic shares held by various associations in the city. However the municipality subsequently decreased its share of ownership: In 2006 the company was owned by the association of port employees (16%), the association of central market vendors (16%), two women's cooperatives (32%), the Chamber of Commerce and Industries (16%) and the municipality (20%). The company signed a contract with the municipality which specified specific targets to be achieved, and the municipality created a municipal regulatory body to monitor the company's performance.

Access and service quality improved substantially between 1995 and 2006. Water supply is now continuous, monthly billing has increased 25-fold in nominal terms, water production has more than doubled and non-revenue water has been reduced from an estimated 40% to 25%.

In 1998 the city obtained financing from the Inter-American Development Bank to extend the sewerage system and to build a wastewater treatment plant to put an end to the pollution of the Alvarado lagoon near the city. In 2003 the consulting firm Hal crow won a contract to design the wastewater treatment plant using stabilization ponds, a natural technique with low operation and maintenance costs.

=== Other Institutions ===
==== The Honduran Social Fund (FHIS) ====
The Fondo Hondureño de Inversion Social (FHIS) or Honduran Social Fund also plays an important role in the sector, since a large share of donor funding to the sector is channeled through it.

==== The Honduran Network of Water and Sanitation (RAS-HON) ====
The Red de Agua y Saneamiento de Honduras (RAS-HON) or Honduran Network of Water and Sanitation is an institution for dialogue, advise and interchange of the water supply and sanitation sector, consisting of organizations, institutions and collaborating people who develop and carry out plans and projects.

==== Water board associations ====
In 1990, the rural water boards created a national association, the Associación Hondureña de Juntas Administradoras de Agua (AHJASA) or Honduran Association of Water Boards in order to protect their interests. In 2004, the association had about 500 water boards as members, representing 380,000 users. The water boards pay 10 to 15% of their tariff income to AHJAS. Moreover, there are 50 Asociaciones de Juntas de Agua Municipales (AJAMs) or Municipal Water Board Associations. Some of them also receive a part of approximately 5% of the tariff incomes of their members. Some Associations operate chlorine banks for their members.

==== Intermunicipal Associations (Mancomunidades) ====
Furthermore, most rural municipalities are organized in Mancomunidades or Intermunicipal Associations, many of which have formed Unidades Técnicas Intermunicipales (UTIs) or Intermunicipal Technical Units in charge of investment projects management. The FHIS' Proyecto de Infraestructura Rural (PIR) or Rural Infrastructure Project gives support to six of the Mancomunidades.

==== Non-governmental organizations (NGOs) ====
Many NGOs are active in the Honduran water supply and sanitation sector. One of them is the Fundación Agua para Todos (FUNDAPAT) or Foundation Water for Everybody, created in 1992 on the basis of an initiative of UNICEF, SANAA, the Tegucigalpa Chamber of Commerce and Industry and the Media Association. FUNDAPAT has reached to extend coverage of potable water to 105,000 persons in 104 communities, in particular in the metropolitan area of Tegucigalpa. The communities pay back investment into a rotating fund without interests to maintain the Foundation's capital and make possible the extension of coverage to more quarters. SANAA created a special unit for supporting those projects in poor areas.

The US-based NGO WaterPartners and their local partners support rural water supply in the Departments of Lempira and Intibuca, in western Honduras. The once heavily forested Departments suffers from deforestation. This has led to extreme depletion of the local water tables, forcing women and children to walk far distances to collect water for their families.

WaterPartners contracted with Emory University in 2006 to systematically assess a random sample of projects completed over the last ten years. Few NGOs have conducted systematic studies of the sustainability of their water supply projects. This study represents a significant step towards quantifying results and identifying opportunities for improvement. Results indicated that the systems continued to deliver water at levels demanded by users, people were very satisfied with the new services, and that systems were making positive impacts in users’ daily lives. Challenges identified in the evaluation include dissociation of the local water committees with the local partner organization, "relaxation of system maintenance, financial instability of water committees, poor water quantity in the dry summer months, and contamination and deforestation at the source."

The following other NGOs are also very involved in the sector: Engineers Without Borders Lafayette College , Plan de Honduras, Save the Children, Catholic Relief Services (CRS), Agua para el Pueblo (Eng. Water for the People), World Vision, CARE PASOS 3 (Project of sustainable water supply and sanitation), and Proyecto Aldea Global (Eng. Global Village Project).

== Economic efficiency ==
Water losses, or – more precisely – non-revenue water is estimated at 50% in the capital Tegucigalpa and 43% in San Pedro Sula, well above an estimated efficient level. The water system in Tegucigalpa has more than 9 employees per 1,000 connections, which is about three times as high as the estimated efficient level.

== Financial aspects ==
=== Tariffs ===
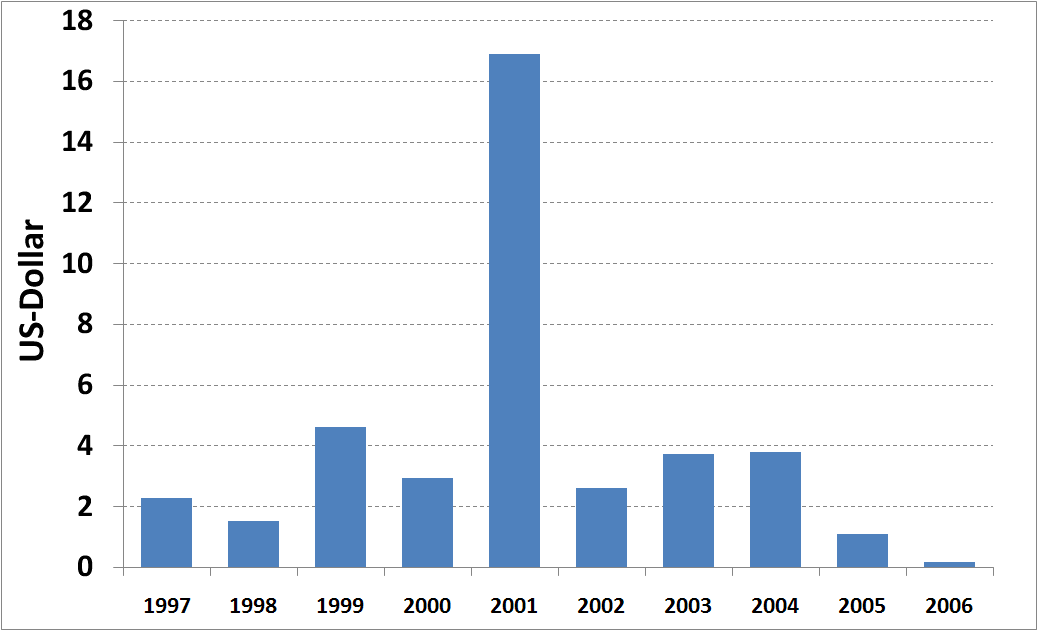
Honduran investment per capita in water supply and sanitation from 1997 to 2006 in constant US Dollars of 2006

The WHO estimates that average urban water tariffs in 2000 were only US$0.13 per cubic meter. A household in Tegucigalpa with a house connection paid only US$2.45 per month for water and US$0.50 for sanitation.

Tariff increase approvals occur infrequently and are insufficient to compensate for inflation, thus resulting in an erosion of real tariff levels. Tariffs in municipal systems tend to be even lower than tariffs for systems managed by SANAA, suggesting that tariff setting in municipalities is more prone to political capture in Honduras than tariff setting at the national level. SANAA's sanitation tariff corresponds to 25% of the water tariff.

=== Investment ===
According to the Honduran ministry of finance, US$262 million were invested in the sector between 1997 and 2006, which is on average US$4 per capita and year. The annual investment mostly ranged from US$1.1 and US$4.6 per capita. In 2001 it was extremely high, reaching US$16.9. On the other hand, in 2006 it was at only US$0.2 per capita On average, the investment level is similar to Costa Rica and Mexico, but lower than South American countries like Argentina, Peru and Colombia.

== External financing ==
The Honduran water supply and sanitation sector receives significant support in terms of financing and technical assistance from a big variety of donors. Most important donors are the World Bank, the IDB, USAID, the European Union, German KfW and Swiss SDC. Some channel their support through the FHIS (World Bank, IDB, KfW, USAID, COSUDE) and others through SANAA (USAID, European Union). While all donors assist municipalities and their mancomunidades concerning decentralization, some implement small subprojects for the communities themselves (KfW) and others carry out subprojects of a certain size through construction companies (World Bank)

=== World Bank ===
- The Water and Sanitation Sector Modernization Project is a US$30m project approved in June 2007 and executed by the Ministry of Finance. The project supports implementing the Plan Estratégico de Modernización del Sector de Agua y Saneamiento or Strategic Water and Sanitation Sector Modernization Plan. The following municipalities are eligible for investment and technical assistance: Choloma, Choluteca, Comayagua, Danlí, El Progreso, La Ceiba, La Lima, Puerto Cortés, Siguatepeque and other smaller municipalities that decide to get together to create a joint public services utility.
- The Rural Infrastructure Project is a US$47m project approved in 2005, of which US$10m will be used for water supply and sanitation investment in six Honduran mancomunidades: CRA in Santa Bárbara, Chortí in Copán, MANCEPAZ in La Paz, MAMNO in Olancho, Mambocaure in Choluteca and Guisayote in Ocotepeque. The project is being executed by FHIS.
- The Barrio Ciudad Project is a US$16.5m project approved by the World Bank and executed by FHIS. It takes place in outlying areas of Honduran middle sized towns, including Comayagua, Danlí, Santa Rosa de Copán, El Progreso and Villanueva.
- The Nuestras Raices Program was approved in 2004 with a high participatory approach and concentrates on increased participation by Indigenous and Afro-Honduran groups. Total project cost is US$16,7m. Construction of water systems is one of the major foci of the program.

==== Water and Sanitation Program (WSP) ====
World Bank's WSP supports Honduras through technical assistance and studies. For a summary of WSP publications about Honduras visit the WSP website

==== Global Partnership on Output Based Aid (GPOBA) ====
The OBA Project is a US$4.6m project aimed at extending water supply and sanitation services to poor areas. It was approved in June 2006 and is being executed by FHIS. An innovative mechanism called output based aid is used to provide services to 40,000 households in rural and peri-urban areas. Resources are used for subsidies for investments to ameliorate service provision by both public and private service providers.

=== Interamerican Development Bank (IDB) ===
- The Water Supply and Sanitation Investment Program is financed by a US$30m loan approved in 2007 as supplemental financing of a former loan approved in 1999. The program supports technical assistance and civil construction works in middle sized municipalities that are reforming water supply and sanitation services. The project is executed by FHIS.
- The Support for the Sector Implementation of the Poverty Reduction Strategy Project is a US$0.75m project approved in 2004 and executed by the Ministry of Finance.
- The Potable Water and Sanitation Project is a US$0.65m project approved in 2004 and executed by ERSAPS.

=== USAID ===
Since 1960, USAID has supported the Honduran water supply and sanitation sector. Since 1980, it is particularly active in rural areas. Approximately US$56m were invested between 1980 and 2006. With these resources, 3,469 potable water systems were constructed or reconstructed in all Honduran departments. The main Honduran counterparts are SANAA and FHIS’ Directorate for Major Infrastructure (DIM). Many NGOs, such as FUNDAPAT, Save the Children, Plan de Honduras, Catholic Relief Services (CRS), World Vision, Proyecto Aldea Global (Eng. Global Village Project) and Water for People, also received USAID support.

A series of special sanitary sewage projects was constructed by DIM-FHIS. Potable water systems were built by the communities themselves contributing labor. They use material that is bought and supplied by SANAA, whose engineers also design the constructions. The works are supervised by staff of the NGOs or SANAA. They also carry out sanitary education in communities and organize Juntas.

The Técnicos de Operación y de Mantenimiento (TOM) or Operation and Maintenance Engineers and the Técnicos de Agua y Saneamiento (TAS) or Water and Sanitation Engineers, who support the Juntas are a key element in this intervention method. The model was developed with USAID's support and has been adopted by SANAA for other operations.

The interventions also used and ameliorated the Sistema de Información de Acueductos Rurales (SIAR) or Rural Aqueducts Information System, which is used since 1986. SIAR classifies potable water systems into four categories according to their operating level. The system is an important instrument for investment planning and monitoring service quality. It is still working and it recently received World Bank support for actualization through the Rural Infrastructure Project executed by FHIS. Programs supported by USAID significantly contributed to increase potable water coverage in rural areas from 21% in 1974 to 74% in 2001. Between 1988 and 1999, 80% of coverage increase were due to USAID's support.

=== European Union ===
The European Union supports the Honduran water supply and sanitation sector through various projects. The Programa Regional de Reconstrucción para América Central (PRRAC) or Regional Central America Reconstruction Program was equipped with €250m at the regional level, whereof €119m were conferred to Honduras. It is mainly aimed at constructing infrastructure in education, health and water supply and sanitation. The anticipated investment only for the water supply and sanitation sector is €64m. The project is about to end.

The PRRAC AGUA assisted the rehabilitation of aqueducts, wells and basic sanitation at the Honduran rural level at a cost of €26.3m. 34,419 latrines, 2,333 wells and 567 aqueducts were constructed, resulting in sanitary education and provision of 56,702 families and strengthening Juntas in 1,364 rural communities in the departments of Gracias a Dios, Colón, El Paraíso, Francisco Morazán and Valle.

Within the €11m PRRAC Liquid and Solid Sanitation in middle sized towns framework, a modern sanitary landfill in Talanga was constructed and sanitation systems as well as sewage plants were renovated or extended in six middle sized Honduran towns: Talanga, Tocoa, Catacamas, Puerto Lempira, Paraíso and Nacaome. In those towns, municipal water supply and sanitation structures were strengthened.

The €26.7m project PRRAC SAN, which supports water supply and sanitation in the outskirts of Tegucigalpa installed potable water systems in the northeast area of the Honduran capital, providing 108.000 inhabitants. Furthermore, blackwater sewers (hydrographic salt water basins with a capacity for 360,000 inhabitant's sewage) were installed in southeastern Tegucigalpa, from which wastewater will be carried to a modern purifying plant, contributing to the purification of Choluteca River.

The European Union also financed a project for local development and decentralization that directly provides municipalities with budget.

=== Germany ===
Germany is supporting the Honduran water sector through a program for multi sector local development in rural areas which is called FHIS-KfW VI and VII Program. It is granted by the Kreditanstalt für Wiederaufbau (KfW) or Reconstruction Credit Institute and executed by FHIS. The project transfers financial resources directly to communities, enabling them to execute subprojects chosen by themselves under a method called Proyecto de Ejecución Comunitara (PEC) or Community Execution Project, which is also used in projects financed by the World Bank and USAID. The project takes place in the mancomunidades MANCURISJ en la Cuenca del Río San Juan in the department of Intibucá; COLOSUCA and CAFEG in the department of Lempira; and Río Higuito in Copán.

=== Switzerland ===
The Swiss Agency for Development and Cooperation (SDC) supports the Water and Sanitation program in Honduras which is currently in the 3rd phase (2004–2007). This phase has a budget of 3,382,000 Swiss Francs (approximately US$3.05m). The project attempts to ameliorate access to potable water and sanitation in the rural sector. It uses direct support activities, such as participation in political debates in the sector.

The project tries to be successful using two strategies:

1. Supporting the sector's institutions from a poverty reducing perspective to implement the sector reform
2. Ameliorating access to potable water and sanitation Honduran's poorest population through direct help. A decentralization model is used that makes local organizations to executers of their own projects, supported by a facilitator to strengthen their capacities and ameliorate the approval and sustainability of the projects.

=== UNICEF ===
UNICEF has helped SANAA for many years. It will help SANAA and various municipalities in elaborating Municipal Water Plans.

== See also ==
- Water resources management in Honduras

== Sources ==
- World Bank: Honduras Strategic Modernization Plan of the Water and Sanitation Sector (PEMAPS) (in Spanish)
- WSP Poverty and Sanitation (in Spanish)
- WSP – New roles for rural water associations and boards in Honduras
- PPIAF Country Framework Report Honduras, 2003
- Water Management in Tegucigalpa, ca. 2007, by Zairis Coello, University of Uppsala, Sweden
