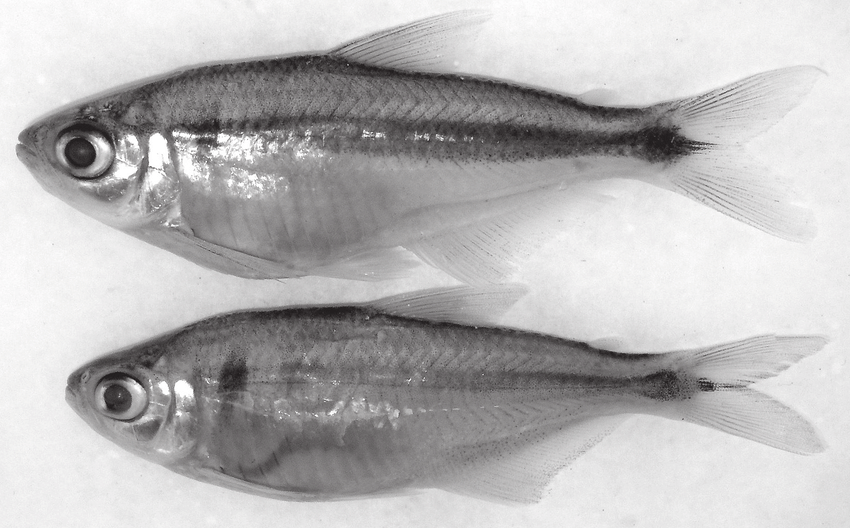
- Female (upper) and male (lower)

Conservation status
- Least Concern (IUCN 3.1)

Scientific classification
- Kingdom: Animalia
- Phylum: Chordata
- Class: Actinopterygii
- Division: Teleostei
- Order: Characiformes
- Family: Acestrorhamphidae
- Genus: Astyanax
- Species: A. aeneus

Binomial name
- Astyanax aeneus (Günther, 1860)

Synonyms
- Tetragonopterus aeneus Günther, 1860; Tetragonopterus microphthalmus Günther, 1864; Tetragonopterus humilis Günther, 1864

= Astyanax aeneus =

Species of fish

Astyanax aeneus, the banded tetra, is a species of freshwater ray-finned fish belonging to the family Acestrorhamphidae, the American characins. This fish is found in southern Central America and northern South America. It can be found in a variety of environments, including lakes, rivers, ponds, and slightly brackish locales like lagoons. As well as a varied habitat, it has a varied omnivorous diet: algae, seeds, leaves, insects, and fish fry appear to be the most common.

The IUCN considers A. aeneus a species of least concern, given its widespread habitat and hardy nature. Various threats throughout its range appear to have little impact on overall survivability. Despite a comparatively-short reproductive period, individuals also demonstrate high fecundity, which assists in maintaining a stable population.

== Description ==
Astyanax aeneus has silver sides, a white belly, and a greenish-brown back. There is a black rhomboidal shape on the caudal peduncle that extends to the tips of the middle caudal rays, but the fins are mostly transparent otherwise. Occasionally, the dorsal and caudal fins will display some red or yellow coloration. Upon preservation in alcohol, a gray band develops from the humeral spot to the caudal blotch; the humeral spot itself is distinct in living and deceased specimens, and is sometimes rhomboid or P-shaped. Depending on the individual, there may be the suggestion of a second spot behind the first on both sides, but this is often just an intensification of the lateral stripe located there, and is not a true second humeral spot.

The snout is blunt, and the mouth opens forward (as opposed to being upturned). The eye is almost half the size of the head, and is usually wider than the snout is long. Body depth is intermediate, ranging from 34 to 39% SL in larger specimens. Notable morphometric characteristics include 9–11 dorsal-fin rays, 22–31 anal-fin rays (modally 25), and 10–11 pectoral-fin rays. A. aeneus is equipped with gill rakers for feeding, and southern populations may have a higher number of rakers than northern.

=== Sexual dimorphism ===
Astyanax aeneus demonstrates notable sexual dimorphism. Females are the larger sex, reaching 12 cm (4.7 in) standard length (SL), while males reach 7.5 cm (3.0 in) SL. As well as this, there are serrations on the maxillary bones of some large males, which is a feature also seen in some congeners. Furthermore, males are more common than females, with a ratio of 1.8:1 males:females. Occasionally, nuptial tubercles (small fleshy extensions on the anal or pelvic fins of male specimens) may develop; these are sometimes bifid.

== Biology ==
=== Reproduction ===
Body weight and standard length are positively correlated with the relative fecundity of specimens; in other words, large individuals are more likely to be capable of reproduction. Spawning appears to be year-round in most of its range, but can be seasonally restricted depending on the specific site. No matter the case, peak reproductive activity appears to be during warm and wet periods. For instance, populations of A. aeneus in the Champotón river mate the most during the stretch from April to July, and if water quality is poor, they can respond by transferring energy from the liver to increase gamete production, allowing year-round spawning.

=== Trophic role and bioindicator status ===
Astyanax aeneus is considered a keystone nutrient recycler, partially because of its varied appetite, and this specifically applies to phosphorus, which can limit the health of a given ecosystem (especially in neotropical streams like the ones it inhabits). Furthermore, it is considered a good bioindicator of trace metals in the ecosystems of the Yucatán Peninsula, because of how the metals accumulate in the body.

Stress levels measured by certain physiological responses to poor water conditions also make A. aeneus a good indicator of water quality in environments affected by various factors. One example is the Champotón river in southwestern Mexico, which is poorly studied but is under pressure from natural phenomena (like hurricanes) and anthropogenic hazards (like agriculture). Anthropogenic hazards also include pesticides; cholinesterase activity in A. aeneus could possibly be used as a biomarker of pesticide exposure, but field research is inconclusive despite notable laboratory results.

== Taxonomy ==
When originally named, A. aeneus was designated Tetragonopterus aeneus by Albert Günther in 1860. In 1921, Carl H. Eigenmann reassigned Tetragonopterus aeneus to the genus Astyanax, which is where it currently belongs, but as a subspecies of Astyanax fasciatus, labeled Astyanax fasciatus aeneus. This is now considered an obsolete designation, and A. aeneus is recognized as its own species within Astyanax.

In 1990, various specimens of A. aeneus were designated a new species, Astyanax armandoi, but the morphological characteristics said to warrant differentiation were found to be in line with standard inter- and intraspecies variation of A. aeneus, so the name Astyanax armandoi is now considered a junior synonym. Further synonyms include Tetragonopterus humilis and Tetragonopterus microphthalmus, both given by Günther in 1864.

Given its widespread and hardy nature, various species were once grouped together with A. aeneus before being given proper species designation. As such, A. aeneus is regarded as a cryptic species - that is, more than one species currently considered synonymous. It is at the center of a species complex bearing its name.

Within Astyanax, there are three subgenera - Astyanax stricto sensu, Poecilurichthys, and Zygogaster. A. aeneus belongs to the first.

=== Etymology ===
The word "aeneus" means "bronze" or "brazen" in Greek, referencing the brownish back. The specific epithet "aeneus" is not uncommon in taxonomy; consider Anolis aeneus, the bronze anole, or Molothrus aeneus, the bronzed cowbird. The genus name Astyanax refers to Astyanax, a character in Greek mythology, who was the son of Hector of Troy; a reference to the large silver scales of the type species, A. argentatus, resembling armor.

== Distribution ==
Astyanax aeneus is a widespread species. In Central America, countries include Mexico, in the rivers Papaloapan and Colima, Panama, in the rivers Cocle del Norte and Tabasara, and Honduras, in the Choluteca river. South American countries with populations of A. aeneus include El Salvador and Guatemala. While largely freshwater, A. aeneus demonstrates no preference for one specific habitat or another. It is found in fast-flowing rivers, stagnant swamps, sizable lakes, and even the occasional brackish lagoon. Whatever the case, it tends to linger in the stretch between the middle of the water column and the substrate.

Because of its variable environment, A. aeneus is an adaptable species. One example of this is that the lower lip can expand to increase the surface area of the interface between water and air as a part of aquatic surface respiration (ASR) in hypoxic environments. (A specific morphological variation in response to an environmental stressor is referred to as an ecophenotype.) This specific adaptation once led to the mistaken designation of a new species, A. armandoi, which has since been synonymized with A. aeneus.

Astyanax aeneus has also adapted to cave environments in a similar manner to its more well-known cousin, the blind Mexican cavefish (Astyanax mexicanus). Changes include "eye and pigmentation regression, as well as modifications in brain morphology, behaviors, heart regenerative capacity, metabolic processes, and craniofacial organization" (as described by geneticist William R. Jeffery). There are at least two populations of A. aeneus that are stygobitic (living solely in underground water sources, like caves or aquifers), but far more of A. mexicanus (more than 30).

== Diet and ecology ==
Astyanax aeneus is a voracious omnivore. Its diet includes algae, seeds, leaves, fruit, plant husks, insects (both aquatic and terrestrial, as well as larvae), and fish smaller than it, including fry of any species. In turn, A. aeneus is sometimes a food source for human populations in rural areas, and is also subject to infestation by gill parasites from the flatworm family Monogenea; species include Anacanthocotyle anacanthocotyle, Characithecium costaricensis, Diaphorocleidus kabatai, Palombitrema heteroancistrium, and Urocleidoides strombicirrus. In fact, Diaphorocleidus kabatai was first described from the gills of A. aeneus.

=== Sympatry ===
If other fish in the same environment are too large to be eaten, A. aeneus can live in sympatry with them; most examples are congeners. Closely related species Astyanax cocibolca lives syntopically with A. aeneus in Lake Nicaragua. A. aeneus and Astyanax caballeroi both inhabit Lake Catemaco, Mexico. (A. aeneus and A. caballeroi, while they are visually distinct and are considered separate species, have little phenotypic difference; early-stage research presents the possibility that the species are synonymous, just different morphs.)

=== Presence and behavior in aquaria ===
Reportedly, A. aeneus is among the various species of Astyanax available for purchase in the aquarium trade, though their presence appears to be sparse. They seem to be acceptable additions to a community aquarium, though only alongside other species that can keep up with its ravenous appetite and rambunctious nature. Their active nature is a part of why they may be appealing. At least one hobbyist report exists of A. aeneus being part of the exhibits in the Shedd Aquarium.

== Conservation status ==
Astyanax aeneus is considered a species of least concern by the IUCN due to its wide range and generally adaptable nature. Though its range was once wider due to accepted synonymy of species that are now considered separate, its population levels remain high and stable without signs of an imminent decrease or catastrophe. This may change, given its status as a cryptic species; if more speciation is revealed through study, then the range of A. aeneus may shrink as different populations are renamed entirely. However, this is unlikely.
