= Hazama Ando =

Japanese construction corporation

Hazama Ando Corporation
- Native name: 株式会社安藤・間
- Type: Public (K.K)
- Traded as: TYO: 1719
- Industry: Construction
- Predecessor: Hazama Corporation; Ando Corporation
- Founded: (April 1, 2013; 13 years ago) (through merger)
- Headquarters: Akasaka, Minato-ku, Tokyo 107-8658, Japan
- Key people: Toshio Ono (Chairman of the Board of Directors); Masato Fukutomi (President)
- Services: Civil engineering; Construction (civil engineering and building construction); Environmental consulting; Real estate development
- Revenue: ▲JPY 407.9 billion (FY 2016) (US$ 3.7 billion) (FY 2016)
- Net income: ▲JPY 26.2 billion (FY 2016) (US$ 242.6 million) (FY 2016)
- Number of employees: 3,850 (consolidated, as of April 1, 2017)
- Subsidiaries: Hazama Ando Kogyo; Hazama Ando (Thailand); Aoyama Kiko; Hazama Ando Singapore; Hazama Ando Malaysia
- Website: Official website

Hazama Ando Corporation (株式会社安藤・間, Kabushiki-gaisha Andō Hazama; also called 安藤ハザマ), is one of the 10 biggest construction companies in Japan. It was launched in 2013 by the merger of the Hazama Corporation and Ando Corporation. It has overseas offices in Asia, especially in the South Asian countries like Nepal, as well as in the United States, Mexico, Central and South America.

== History ==
The predecessors of the current company, Hazama and Ando, were established in 1889 and 1873, respectively. The two companies originally formed a capital and business tie-up in 2003, and were collaborating over order receipts and materials procurement before the merger.

== Selected Projects ==
- Tokyo's Ginza Line (1933)
- Kanmon Bridge (1971)
- Monseñor Óscar Arnulfo Romero International Airport - San Salvador (1980)
- One Raffles Place - Singapore (1986)
- Autopolis - Hita, Japan (1989)
- Kansai International Airport (1989)
- Tokyo Big Sight (1995)
- New Choluteca Bridge - Choluteca, Honduras (1998)
- Kelana Jaya Line underground section (Masjid Jamek-Ampang Park), 1998
- Petronas Twin Towers (Tower 1) - Kuala Lumpur (1998)

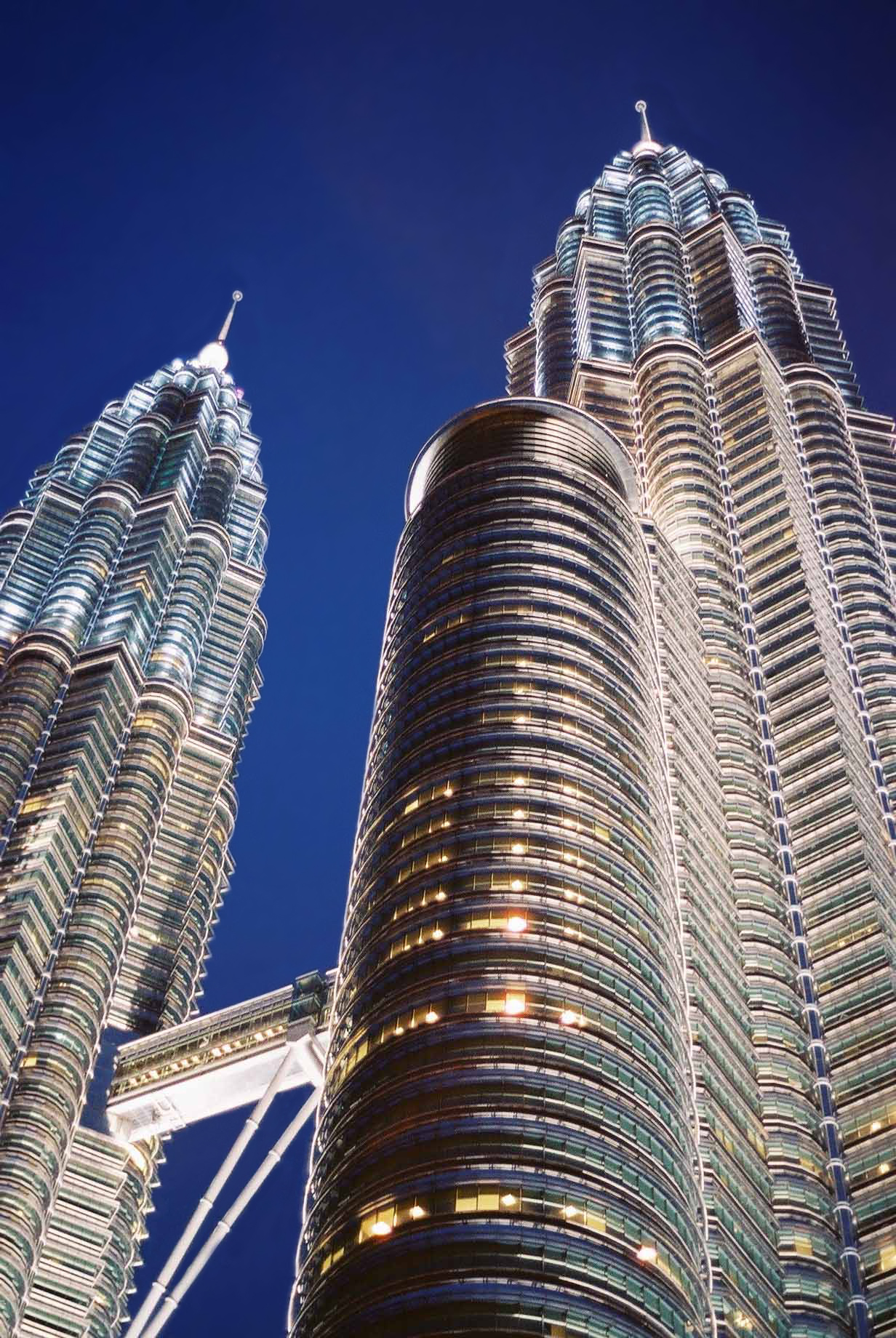
The Petronas Twin Towers. One of the towers was built by Hazama.

- Chubu Centrair International Airport (airport island reclamation) (2003)
- Hải Vân Tunnel (2005)
- Subic–Clark–Tarlac Expressway - Manila (2008)
- Algeria East–West Highway (eastern section) (2011)

== See also ==
- Les Noces de Pierrette
- Albert Ando
