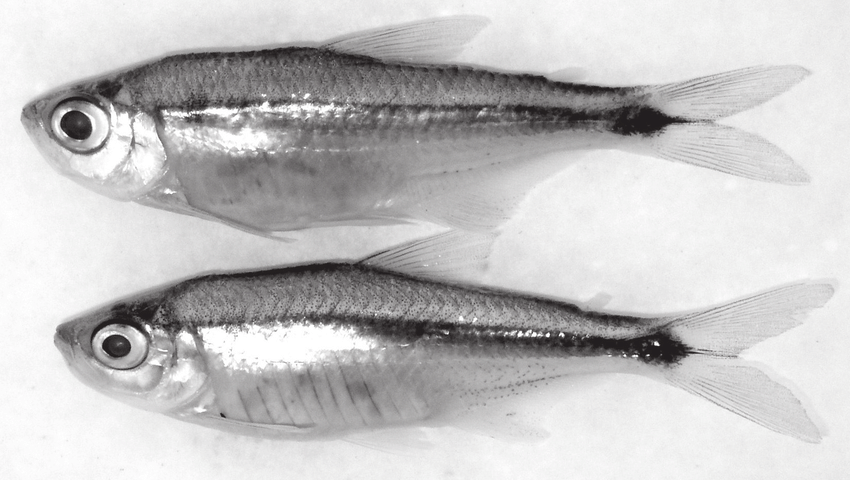
- Male (upper), female (lower)

Conservation status
- Data Deficient (IUCN 3.1)

Scientific classification
- Kingdom: Animalia
- Phylum: Chordata
- Class: Actinopterygii
- Order: Characiformes
- Family: Acestrorhamphidae
- Genus: Astyanax
- Species: A. cocibolca

Binomial name
- Astyanax cocibolca Bussing, 2008

= Astyanax cocibolca =

Species of fish

Astyanax cocibolca s a species of freshwater ray-finned fish belonging to the family Acestrorhamphidae, the American characins. This fish is found in the Lake Nicaragua basin. It was once thought to be endemic to the lake, but its range has since been extended into nearby waterways; still, it is not particularly widespread. It is an omnivorous species that demonstrates a preference for fruit when living close to shore, but specimens living in the open waters of the lake have developed filter-feeding planktivory, which is unusual for members of the genus Astyanax.

It is closely related to another member of Astyanax found in the same lake, A. aeneus, but is smaller and more slender. The two otherwise look rather alike and have similar diets, aside from the planktivory of A. cocibolca. Before its nomination as a species, examples of A. cocibolca were also misidentified as congener Astyanax nasutus, which used to be the only other species of Astyanax known from the relevant locales.

== Taxonomy ==
Astyanax cocibolca was formally described in a 2008 paper, where it was differentiated from Astyanax aeneus and Astyanax nasutus. It required differentiation from A. aeneus due to syntopy, and from A. nasutus because A. nasutus was formerly believed to be the only other species of Astyanax in the region. However, there was speculation of an unidentified, nasutus-affiliated Astyanax as early as 1976. Sightings of A. cocibolca have also been misidentified as A. nasutus in other records from 1987 and 1998.

There are three subgenera in Astyanax: Astyanax, Poecilurichthys, and Zygogaster. Of these, A. cocibolca belongs to Astyanax, based on its complete series of predorsal scales. (The other two subgenera have incomplete series.)

Astyanax cobicolba has no known synonyms, and has retained its original name since description.

=== Etymology ===
The species name cocibolca is a direct reference to its type locality. It was originally described from Lake Nicaragua, which the indigenous people call Lake Cocibolca. The reason for the name of the genus Astyanax is less clear, as it was not made obvious in the original description, but it is an allusion to the Iliad, wherein Astyanax was a warrior and prince. This is thought to be because the scales of type species Astyanax argentatus were large and silvery in a way that could be compared to armor or a shield.

== Description ==
Astyanax cocibolca is a small and slender-bodied fish, reaching a maximum of 5.4 cm (2.1 in) SL (standard length, excluding the tail fin). The maximum depth of the body ranges from 29.1 to 36.4% of the length. The lateral line has 34 to 38 scales. There are 9 or 10 dorsal-fin rays, 24 to 27 anal-fin rays (most often 25), and 10 to 14 rays in each pectoral fin. There are 17 caudal-fin rays in total; the upper lobe is smaller than the lower, and usually has fewer than 9 rays. The inequality of the caudal-fin lobes can be used to tell A. cocibolca apart from similar congeners, such as Astyanax orstedii, that have caudal lobes of roughly equal sizes. The mouth is slightly upturned.

The coloration of Astyanax cocibolca is similar to that of many congeners, with a base silvery color and a dark midlateral stripe that extends down both sides. This stripe manifests as a dark rhomboidal blotch on the caudal peduncle and base of the caudal fin, and extends out to the margins of the median caudal-fin rays. When preserved in formalin, coloration may vary depending on how long the fish has been preserved, but the body generally gains a tan or pale-yellow undertone, and the caudal spot becomes more prominent. Pigmentation of the fins is sparse, and appears to be concentrated distally. Fins in some mixture of red, orange, yellow, and clear are common features in members of Astyanax.

As with many congeners, A. cocibolca has a humeral spot. In life, this is oval-shaped, and it becomes more diffuse upon preservation.

== Distribution and ecology ==
Astyanax cocibolca is native to Lake Nicaragua and surrounding waterways. This places it primarily in southern Nicaragua, ranging into the relevant Atlantic drainages of northern Costa Rica. It was formerly considered one of very few fish species endemic to the direct Lake Nicaragua ecosystem, but has since had range extensions into the Sarapiqui and Tortuguero drainages.

Astyanax cocibolca is sytopic with Astyanax aeneus, from whom it can be told apart by various features. The easiest way is by its small size. A. cocibolca is more slender than the deep-bodied A. aeneus, and A. cocibolca is usually no longer than 5 cm (2 in), whereas A. aeneus is often longer than 8 cm (3 in).

Astyanax cocibolca is unusual in its dietary habits. Inshore inhabitants will eat primarily fruits, seeds, and algae, and this is not unusual; A. aeneus has a similarly fruit-heavy diet. What sets A. cocibolca apart is that those living in the open waters of Lake Nicaragua are filter-feeders, largely consuming copepods (copepoda) and water fleas (cladocera). The development of planktivory is apparently what prompted the speciation of A. cocibolca from A. aeneus. This happened because the other planktivorous species in the lake (Dorosoma chavesi and Atherinella sardina) are more common in the inshore habitats, which left a niche open for a small planktivore to evolve in the open waters.

Lake Nicaragua itself is relatively shallow and low-elevation, with substrate largely composed of grayish mud and organic silt. Its standard depth ranges from 9 to 13 m (30 to 42 ft), though its deepest point is 37 m (120 ft), and it sits at roughly 31 m (102 ft) above sea level.

== Conservation status ==
Astyanax cocibolca is considered data deficient. This is primarily due to uncertainty regarding the distribution of the species, which can be attributed to limited sampling. Its type locality, Lake Nicaragua, is under ecological pressure from factors including cattle farming that leads to erosion, pesticide usage, and wastewater inflow from coastal towns; local government agencies are strongly considering an ecotourism program to prevent such factors from worsening conditions further.

The island in the middle of the lake, Ometepe Island, is in the process of becoming a UNESCO biosphere reserve. This island is also considered a geological heritage site by the International Union of Geological Sciences, due to the volcanoes that formed it, and it is further its own archaeological dig site dating back roughly 2000 years, with petroglyphs, ceramics, and graveyards. These factors make Lake Nicaragua the focus of several different conservation efforts at once, which provides something of an ecological buffer for species such as A. cocibolca.
