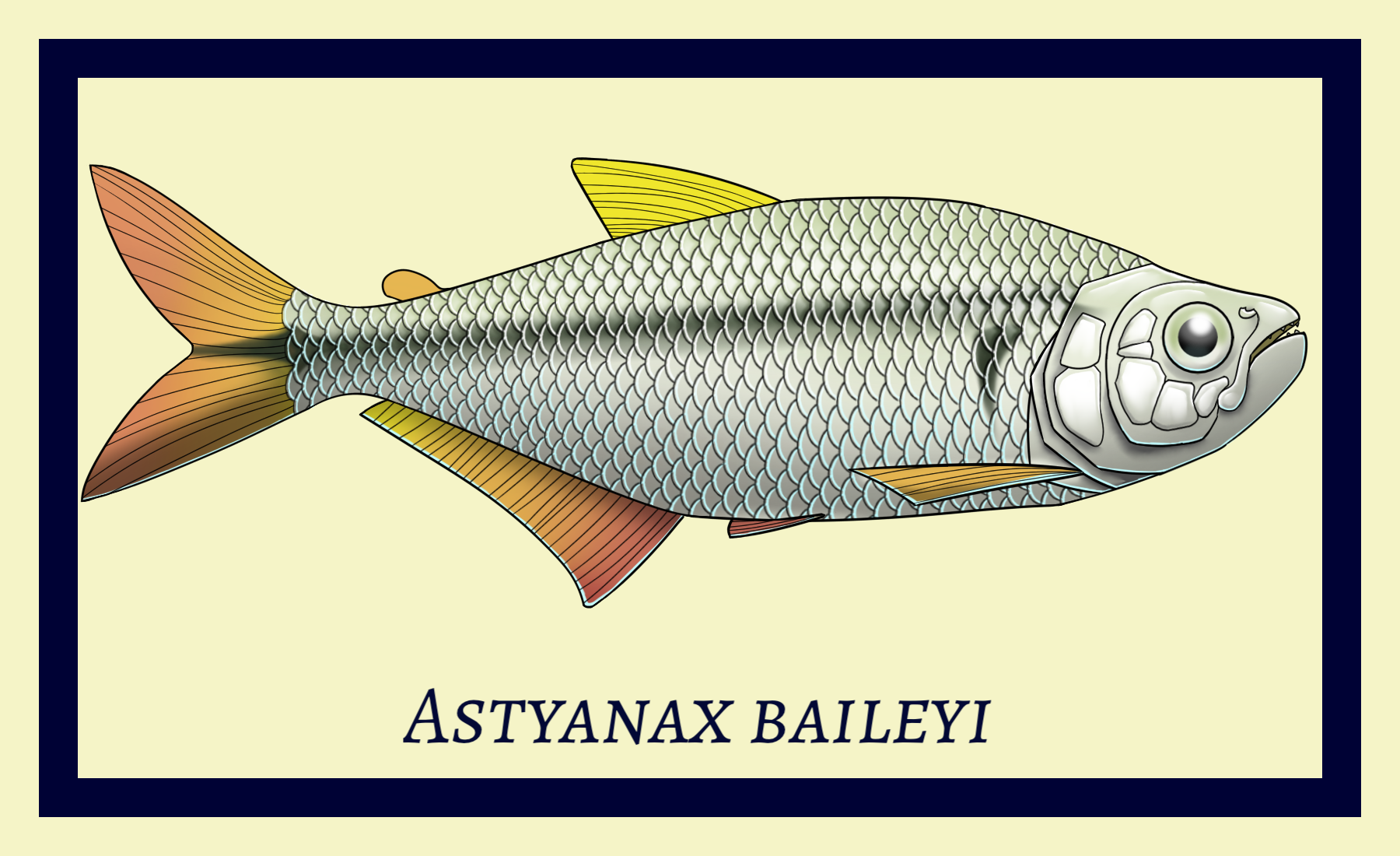
- An illustration of Astyanax baileyi

Conservation status
- Data Deficient (IUCN 3.1)

Scientific classification
- Kingdom: Animalia
- Phylum: Chordata
- Class: Actinopterygii
- Division: Teleostei
- Order: Characiformes
- Family: Acestrorhamphidae
- Genus: Astyanax
- Species: A. baileyi

Binomial name
- Astyanax baileyi (Rosen, 1972)

Synonyms
- Bramocharax baileyi Rosen, 1972

= Astyanax baileyi =

Species of fish

Astyanax baileyi is a species of freshwater ray-finned fish belonging to the family Acestrorhamphidae, the American characins. This fish is found in northern Guatemala. Based on several visual aspects, it was once considered a member of the genus Bramocharax, which is now obsolete, and has since been synonymized with Astyanax. As such, former members of Bramocharax are now a part of Astyanax, like Astyanax bransfordii and Astyanax caballeroi.

The scales of its body are largely silver, with a yellow or yellow-green cast. Its fins are some mix of orange and pink, and there is a dark patch on its tail-fin joint that spreads onto the tail fin itself. These are not unusual features for a member of Astyanax, but other aspects are somewhat unorthodox, hence why it was once considered a member of a different genus. In modern ichthyology, the unusual parts of A. baileyi's appearance - like a compressed body and a long snout - are considered to be adaptations to its environment and role in the food web.

== Taxonomy ==
When first described in 1972 by American ichthyologist Donn Eric Rosen, Astyanax baileyi was named Bramocharax baileyi. Two years prior, it had been considered a subspecies of Bramocharax bransfordii, B. b. dorioni, but was given species distinction based upon bodily proportions, scale pigmentation, and aspects of dentition. In modern ichthyology, B. bransfordii is also a member of Astyanax, now named Astyanax bransfordii; the genus Bramocharax is largely considered obsolete, based on various genetic analyses that failed to find meaningful differentiations between the genera. In a comprehensive 2008 study, several species formerly considered members of Bramocharax were found to in fact form clades with established Astyanax species. Astyanax baileyi was given its official designation as a member of Astyanax in a redescription by Mexican ichthyologist Juan Jacob Schmitter-Soto in 2017.

When Bramocharax was still an accepted genus, there were enough similarities between members of Bramocharax and Astyanax (such as in skull osteology) for researchers to suggest a phylogenetic relationship before one was confirmed through further analysis. Comparing Astyanax fasciatus (now an obsolete species, split up into various other members of Astyanax) and then-Bramocharax A. baileyi, there were intermediate morphological states between the two; however, these ended up being misleading, as the morphological differences between species assigned to separate genera are now thought to be a result of trophic specialization that has arisen independently in lineages faced with similar environmental pressures. As such, there are two separate "morphs" used to refer to the different body shapes that led to genus separation. The Astyanax morph consists of fish with a deep body, a blunt snout, and multicuspid teeth, while the Bramocharax morph is fusiform, long-snouted, and unicuspid.

There are three subgenera in Astyanax - Astyanax, Poecilurichthys, and Zygogaster - and A. baileyi belongs to the first, based upon a complete series of predorsal scales. There is suspicion that it is related to A. mexicanus and A. abramoides.

=== Etymology ===
The specific epithet "baileyi" is in honor of Reeve M. Bailey, a tutor and friend of Rosen for 26 years and a valued companion during various field expeditions. The genus name "Astyanax" is in reference to the Iliad, wherein Astyanax is the son of Trojan prince Hector. A reason for this allusion was not made clear in the nominal text, but could possibly originate in the scales of type specimen Astyanax argentatus, which are large and silvery in a way that could be compared to armor or a shield. A. baileyi has no accepted common name, but "Bailey's tetra" has been suggested as a result of the specific epithet.

== Description ==
Astyanax baileyi reaches a maximum of 6.9 cm (2.7 in) in standard length (SL). It has 3 or 4 maxillary teeth and 9–13 premaxillary teeth. There are 10–13 dorsal-fin rays, 23–28 anal-fin rays (with a mean of 25), and 12–16 pectoral-fin rays. The dentition of young A. baileyi more closely resembles something expected from the Astyanax genus as a whole, but adult specimens more distinctly display traits of the Bramocharax morph that earned it its basionym. The body is consistently slender (fusiform), and the snout is relatively long; many other Astyanax are deep-bodied and short-snouted, which is partially what led to the separation of genera in the first place.

The base scale color is silvery with a tinge of yellow or yellow-green. The dorsal fin is a pale yellow-orange, and the rest of the fins are a pale pink. It has one humeral spot, vertically elongated below the lateral line. This humeral spot is p-shaped. There is a dark blotch of pigment on the caudal peduncle that extends onto the middle caudal-fin rays. Sexual dimorphism is unknown.

== Distribution and habitat ==
Astyanax baileyi is endemic to the Usumacinta River basin; specifically, it can be found in the Alta Verapaz department of north-central Guatemala. One of the first specimens was collected specifically from the Rio San Simon, 6 km due west of Chisec, and its type locality is the Rio Dolores, along the shore by the village of Yaxcabnal. Its distribution is known to be highly restricted, with an estimated Extent of Occurrence (EOO) of 546 km2.

The Usumacinta River main has plentiful riparian vegetation and is an important part of the local carbon cycle. It has a main channel length of 927 km. The San Simon passes through mountains of the same name, with a history of abruptly disappearing during periods of excess drought. There are also nearby caves that serve as minor tourist attractions. The Dolores serves as a source of drinking water, irrigation, and livelihood for various indigenous communities along its length.

== Diet and ecology ==
Astyanax baileyi has been collected in sympatry with poeciliid species Xiphophorus helleri guentheri and Heterandria bimaculata. Little is known of its diet, but a congener with similar trophic adaptations, Astyanax caballeroi, has a diet consisting largely of invertebrates and detritus from other fish, with supplemental plant material. The longer head and jaws could possibly be associated with predatory behavior. Research on the ecology and life history of A. baileyi in particular is sparse.

== Conservation status ==
Astyanax baileyi is considered a data deficient species by the IUCN. Given that there is little information regarding further occurrence outside of current records, ecology, and adaptability, decisions regarding conservation cannot adequately be made. However, A. baileyi's habitat is known to face various environmental pressures.

Parts of the Usumacinta River basin are suffering ongoing deforestation and agricultural development, both of which can damage riparian vegetation and introduce pollution. There is also the potential for hydroelectric dam construction along the river's length in Mexico, which is not a direct threat to A. baileyi but may set a precedent for altering the river's flow. The Rio San Simon, a locale recorded early in research of A. baileyi, has recently been facing excessive drought, and the Rio Dolores, its type locality, is the subject of increasing pollution.
