= Choluteca Bridge =

Name of two bridges in Honduras

Choluteca, Honduras has two bridges that cross the Choluteca River.

== Old Choluteca Bridge ==
Old Choluteca Bridge
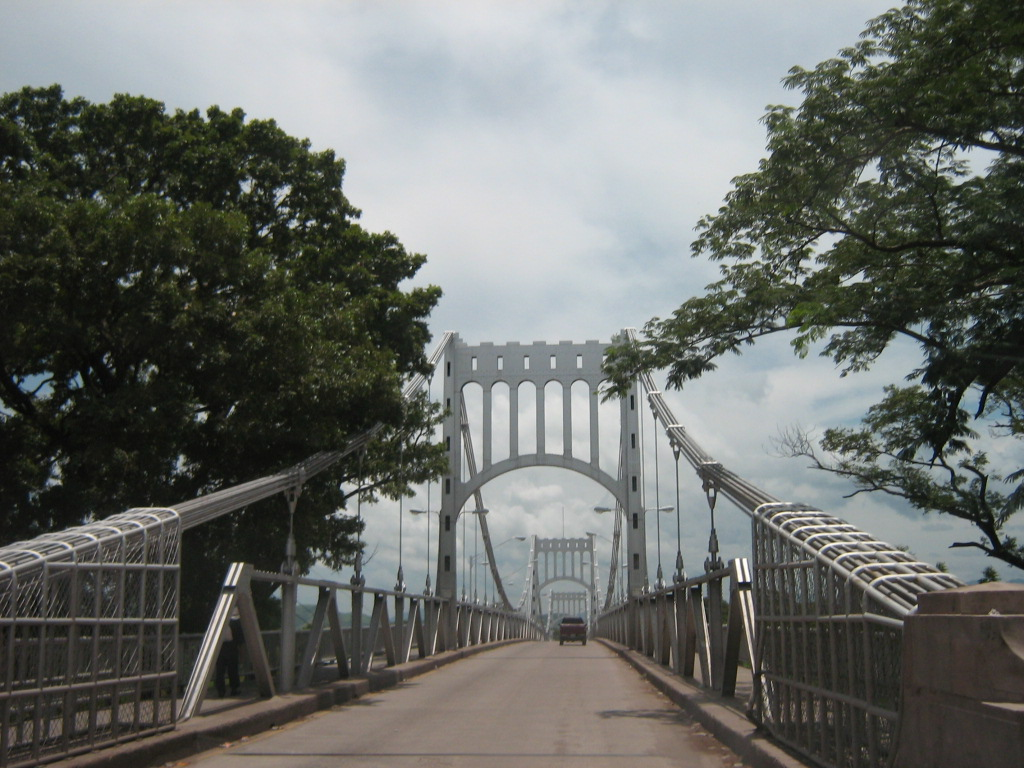
- Old Choluteca Bridge, 2005
- Coordinates: 13.3116°N 87.1915°W
- Crosses: Choluteca River
- Locale: Choluteca
- Maintained by: SOPTRAVI

Characteristics
- Design: Suspension
- Material: Steel

History
- Designer: Conde B. McCullough, R. Archibald
- Construction start: 1935
- Construction end: 1937
- Opened: 1938, 2002

Location
- Interactive map of Old Choluteca Bridge

The Old Choluteca Bridge, Carías Bridge or simply the Choluteca Bridge, (Spanish: Puente de Choluteca), is a suspension bridge. It is an emblem of the nation and the city where it is located. It was built between 1935 and 1937 by the United States Army Corps of Engineers using US and Honduran capital for the construction of the road named Panamericana. The bridge's importance is not simply a matter of size. The Choluteca Bridge is 300 meters long, but it isn't the longest in the country or even in the city—there is another bridge in Choluteca called The Bridge of the Rising Sun (New Choluteca Bridge), which is 484 meters long.

Built during the reign of Tiburcio Carias Andino, with the co-operation of the government of the United States during the time when it was performed, it is considered to be one of the greatest works of architecture in the country. The bridge is one of the few replicas of the Golden Gate Bridge that still exists, and it controls the flow of traffic from Guatemala to Panama. Partially destroyed by Hurricane Mitch in 1998, the bridge was remodelled in the year 2002 under the government of Ricardo Maduro. The old bridge is still used for light traffic.

== New Choluteca Bridge ==
New Choluteca Bridge
- Coordinates: 13.3398°N 87.1677°W
- Crosses: Choluteca River
- Locale: Choluteca
- Official name: Bridge of Rising Sun

History
- Constructed by: Hazama Ando Corporation
- Construction start: 1996
- Construction end: 1998
- Opened: 1998

Location
- Interactive map of New Choluteca Bridge

In the 1990s, a new bypass road and a second bridge was planned for the city. The new Choluteca Bridge, also known as the Bridge of Rising Sun (Spanish: Puente Sol Naciente), was built about 4 km northeast of the old one by Hazama Ando Corporation between 1996 and 1998 and became the largest bridge constructed by a Japanese company in Latin America.

In the same year that the bridge was commissioned for use, Honduras was hit by Hurricane Mitch, which caused considerable damage to the nation and its infrastructure. Many bridges, including the old bridge, were damaged while some were destroyed, but the new Choluteca Bridge survived with minor damage. While the bridge itself was in near perfect condition, the roads on either end of the bridge vanished completely, leaving no visible trace of their prior existence. At this time, the Choluteca River, which is over 100 metres (300 ft) at the bridge, carved itself a new channel during the massive flooding caused by the hurricane. It no longer flowed beneath the bridge, which now spanned dry ground. The bridge quickly became known as "The Bridge to Nowhere". In 2003, the bridge was reconnected to the highway.
