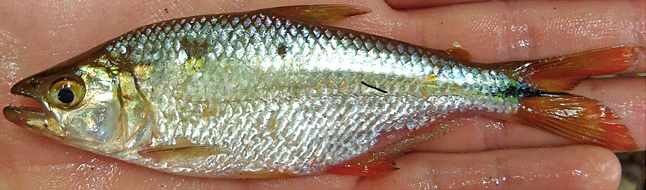

Conservation status
- Near Threatened (IUCN 3.1)

Scientific classification
- Kingdom: Animalia
- Phylum: Chordata
- Class: Actinopterygii
- Order: Characiformes
- Family: Acestrorhamphidae
- Genus: Astyanax
- Species: A. bransfordii

Binomial name
- Astyanax bransfordii Gill, 1877

Synonyms
- Bramocharax bransfordii Gill 1877; Bramocharax elongatus Meek, 1907

= Astyanax bransfordii =

Species of fish

Astyanax bransfordii, sometimes called the longjaw tetra, is a species of freshwater ray-finned fish belonging to the family Acestrorhamphidae, the American characins. This fish is endemic to a handful of lakes and slow-moving canals in Central America. Its range includes Lake Nicaragua and Lake Managua, which are two of the largest freshwater bodies in Central America; because it occurs only in the relevant areas of Costa Rica and Nicaragua, the area it actually inhabits is somewhat restricted. Its diet largely consists of various invertebrates and smaller fish. This is in contrast to various other species of Astyanax, which are more often omnivorous.

Its elongated body and jaws - which garnered the common name "longjaw tetra" - once earned it the distinction of a separate genus altogether, Bramocharax, along with several other members of Astyanax. However, Bramocharax is now considered invalid, and these morphological differences are considered adaptations instead of synapomorphies - that is, changes in shape caused over time by feeding habits, rather than inherited from a relationship to each other through a common ancestor.

== Taxonomy ==
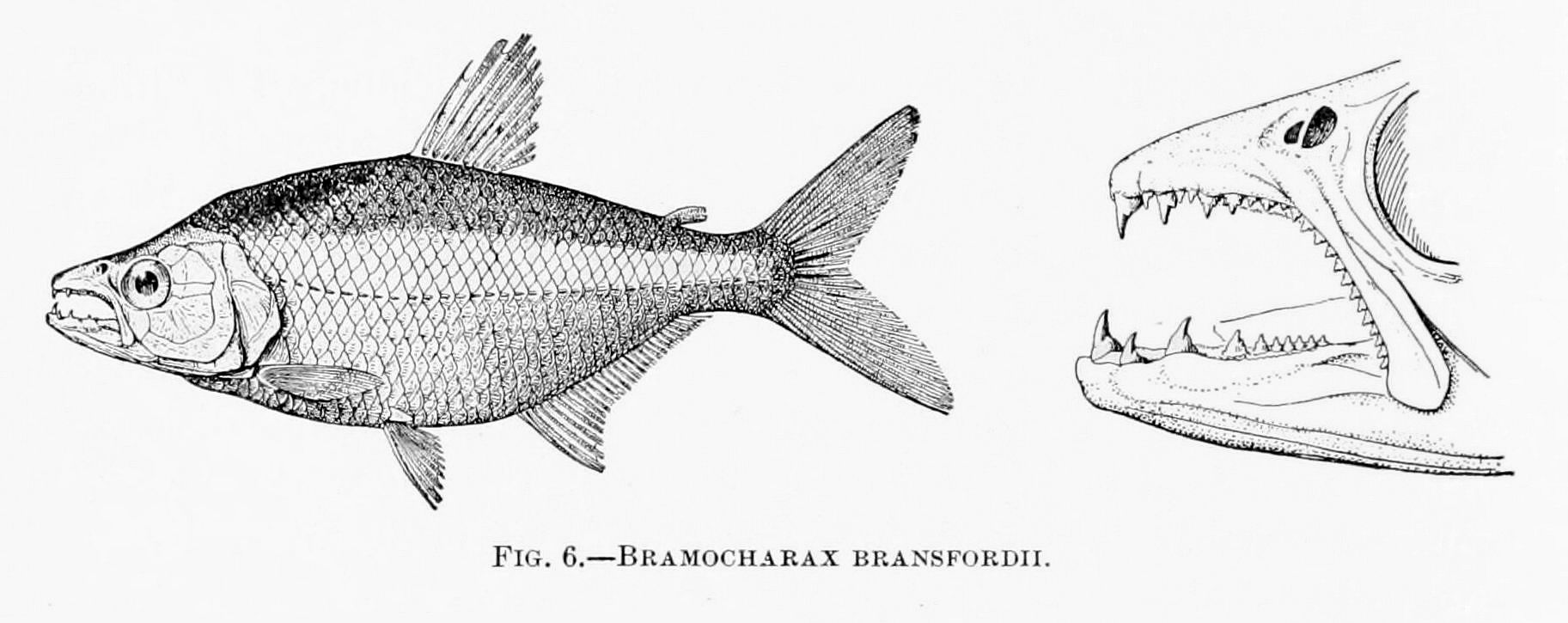
1907 illustration.

When first described by ichthyologist Theodore Gill in 1877, A. bransfordii was called Bramocharax bransfordii, classified in the new genus Bramocharax; by way of monotypy, it became the type species therein. A. bransfordii remained in the genus Bramocharax for the majority of its existence as a species. Species Bramocharax elongatus, described by Seth Eugene Meek in 1907, was synonymized with then-Bramocharax bransfordii by ichthyologist Donn Eric Rosen in 1970. Other species that once belonged to Bramocharax include Astyanax baileyi, Astyanax caballeroi, and Astyanax dorioni.

Based on genetic factors, the genus Bramocharax is largely considered obsolete in favor of Astyanax. A comprehensive 2008 study pointed to several Bramocharax species that formed clades with species of Astyanax, as opposed to with each other; A. bransfordii was found to form a clade with Astyanax nicaraguensis. A large-scale examination of Astyanax in Central and North America by Mexican ichthyologist Juan J. Schmitter-Soto corrected the classification of A. bransfordii, giving it its first official designation as a member of Astyanax. There are three subgenera in Astyanax - Astyanax, Poecilurichthys, and Zygogaster - and Schmitter-Soto placed A. bransfordii in the first.

The morphological differences previously used to separate genera are now thought to be an adaptation that has arisen independently in a handful of species that face similar environmental pressures; as such, there is still use in the labels, but as a matter of morphology, not one of phylogeny. When describing a specific set of features including jaw length, body shape, and dentition, species with the Bramocharax morph are long-snouted, slender, and have unicuspid teeth, while species with the Astyanax morph are short-snouted, deep-bodied, and multicuspid.

=== Etymology ===
The specific epithet "bransfordii" was chosen by Theodore Gill to honor John F. Bransford, an assistant surgeon in the U.S. Navy responsible for collecting the type specimens. Bransford also co-authored the paper that introduced the original description of A. bransfordii. The genus name "Astyanax" is a reference to the Iliad, where Astyanax was a Trojan warrior and son of prince Hector.

Astyanax bransfordii, given the shape of its body and mouth, is sometimes referred to as the longjaw tetra.

== Description ==
Astyanax bransfordii reaches a maximum of 15.0 cm (5.9 in) standard length (SL). The body is long and of moderate depth, with a snout equal to or larger than the eye diameter. The jaws are also elongated, and are of equal length, equipped with large unicuspid teeth in the premaxilla. There are 9–11 dorsal-fin rays, 25 anal-fin rays (though occasionally up to 28), and 16 pectoral-fin rays. There are 10 or more procurrent rays (rays inserted farther apart as they move away from the fin's origin) in the caudal fin. There are 37–38 scales in the lateral line, and 12 scales in the predorsal series. The lateral line is complete. Sexual dimorphism is unknown.

The base scale color is a silver-white, with a darker back in an olive-gray and a gray lateral stripe. The fins are largely transparent, but some specimens demonstrate a light red blotch on the anal fin and/or an orange or red caudal fin. The only part of the fins to not be transparent is the median handful of caudal-fin rays, which are always dark due to a rhomboidal blotch of dark pigment, which continues onto the rays. There is an oval-shaped or indistinct humeral spot. The scales themselves are middling in size, with distinct margins and radiating lines. These radii, while distinct, are weakly-developed, especially in comparison to the dense circuli (rings). Biologist Theodore Cockerell made a comparison to the scales of fish in the family Clupeidae.

== Distribution and habitat ==
The type specimens of A. bransfordii were collected from Lake Nicaragua. Further specimens have been collected from Lake Managua and Cano Palma. It has also appeared in various areas of the Sarapiquí River. It appears to prefer waterways of little current, though it can be found in some areas with moderate velocity. It has been collected from elevations of 5 to 530 meters.

Due to its presence in blackwater habitats, A. bransfordii demonstrates that it does not have high-oxygen needs. Cano Palma, for example, is a blackwater canal with muddy substrate and low visibility. Blackwater conditions are caused when microbial decay acts upon leaf litter and other plant materials, leaching dark-colored tannins into the water; the microbes responsible consume much of the available dissolved oxygen.

== Diet and ecology ==
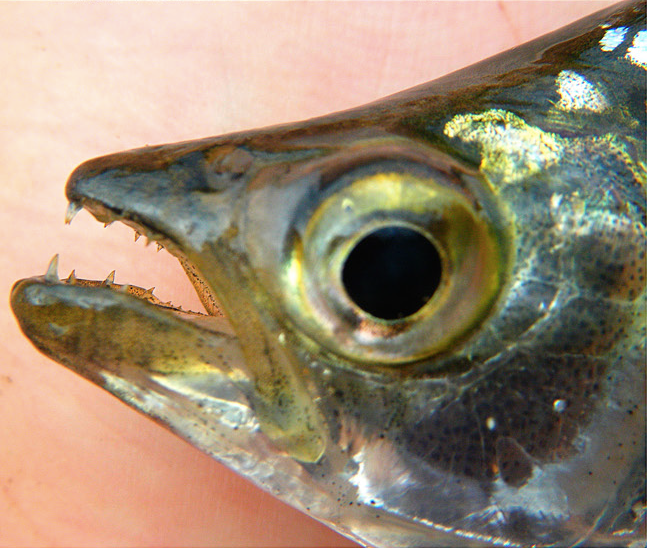
Closeup of jaw and face.

Astyanax bransfordii is a carnivorous species, with a diet composed almost evenly of invertebrates (both aquatic and terrestrial) and smaller fish; these smaller fish include tetras, poeciliids, and cichlids. The differences in snout length between species of the Astyanax morph and the Bramocharax morph are thought to be attributable to predatory behavior on the part of former Bramocharax species.

It feeds upon smaller fish, but A. bransfordii can coexist peacefully with various species of similar size to itself. For instance, other characiform fishes collected in the relevant locales include Roeboides bouchelli, Hyphessobrycon tortuguerae, Brycon costaricensis, and congener Astyanax nicaraguensis.

== Conservation status ==
Astyanax bransfordii is currently considered a near threatened species by the IUCN. This is because it has a somewhat restricted native range that has been subject to several harmful factors, including mining pollution and invasive species, but there is no evidence of immediate and severe population decline. Nonetheless, it is uncommon at sites where it is sampled, and this does not indicate a healthy enough population for a rating of least concern.

Lake Nicaragua, from which the first specimens of A. bransfordii were collected, is the focal point of a watershed containing various protected areas, and the lake itself is under serious consideration for an ecotourism program to help keep the water from becoming polluted; this may help protect not only A. bransfordii but dozens of other species, including those in rare and endemic taxa.

Lake Managua, also called Lake Xolotlan, is in poorer ecological shape. It is one of the largest lakes in Central America, and is subject to severe pollution due to companies and tourists dumping refuse, sewage, and - from 1967 to 1992 - mercury. This not only has negative repercussions on the wildlife, but also on the surrounding human populations, the vast majority of whom are living in poverty and need to rely on the lake for income.

Caño Palma (Spanish for "palm canal") is located inside of the Barra del Colorado Wildlife Refuge, which is an area of protection for A. bransfordii under ongoing study by researchers and volunteers.
