= Patuca =

- Municipality
- Location within Honduras
- Coordinates: 14°19′N 85°58′W
- Country: Honduras
- Department: Olancho

Government
  - Mayor: Juan Carlos Colindres Rosales

Area
  - Total: 635.10 km^{2} (245.21 sq mi)

Population (2015)
  - Total: 27,183
  - Density: 42.801/km^{2} (110.85/sq mi)
- Time zone: UTC-6

Patuca is a municipality in the south of the Honduran department of Olancho, east of Juticalpa and south of Catacamas.

It contains the Patuca River, which is the second largest in Central America.

== Demographics ==
At the time of the 2013 Honduras census, Patuca municipality had a population of 26,668. Of these, 98.27% were Mestizo, 0.92% White, 0.63% Indigenous, 0.12% Black or Afro-Honduran and 0.06% others.
