= Choluteca River =

River in Honduras

Coordinates: 13.0914°N 87.3733°W

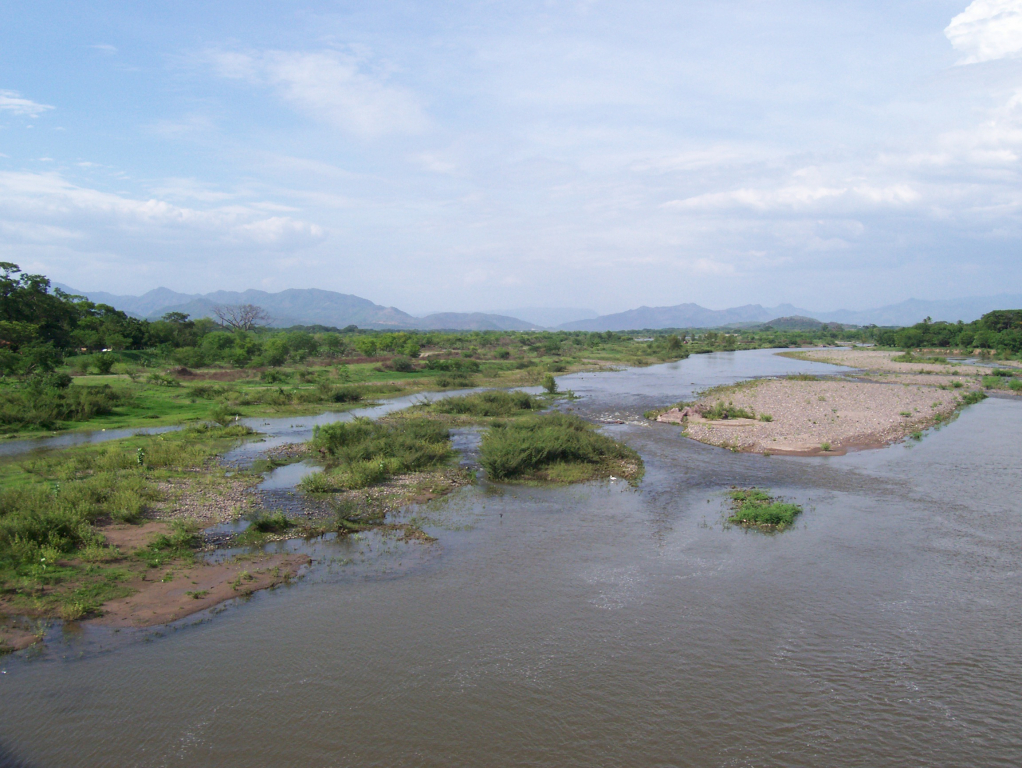
- Choluteca River near the city of Choluteca

Location
- Country: Honduras

Physical characteristics
- Source
  - location: Choluteca, Choluteca, Honduras
- Mouth: Pacific Ocean
  - location: Honduras
  - elevation: 0 m (0 ft)
- Length: 349 km (217 mi)
- Basin size: 7,681 km^{2} (2,966 sq mi)

The Choluteca River (Spanish: Río Grande o Choluteca) is a river in southern Honduras. Its source is in the Department of Francisco Morazán, near Lepaterique (south-west Tegucigalpa), and from there it flows north through the city of Tegucigalpa, then south through the department of El Paraíso, and the department and city of Choluteca. The mouth of the river—located among wetland—is near the coastal town of Cedeño, on the Gulf of Fonseca.

According to FAO, the Choluteca River is 349 kilometres (217 mi) long from source to mouth. Its hydrographic basin has an area of 7,681 square kilometres (2,966 mi^{2}). It increases its volume between May and October, together with the rainy season. Its basin is affected by severe drought together with the El Niño phenomenon, and this is usually associated with severe bush fires.

There are no dams built along the main course of the river to leave it to its natural health.

The flooding of this river was a major source of destruction during Hurricane Mitch in 1998. It washed out entire neighborhoods in Tegucigalpa, and eventually swelled to six times its normal size in Choluteca. There it destroyed neighborhoods and part of the commercial center. Further down it also devastated the tiny Morolica, destroying the entire hamlet, requiring the town to be rebuilt three miles upriver. The hurricane also rerouted the river, which was no longer flowing beneath the New Choluteca Bridge.

== See also ==
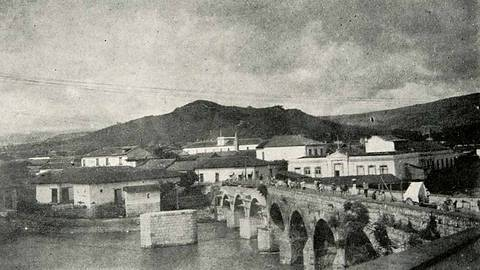
1910 image of a bridge on the River Choluteca in Tegucigalpa

- Rivers of Honduras
- Water Resources Management: The Choluteca river basin in Honduras
- Water Resources Management in Honduras
