= Champotón River =

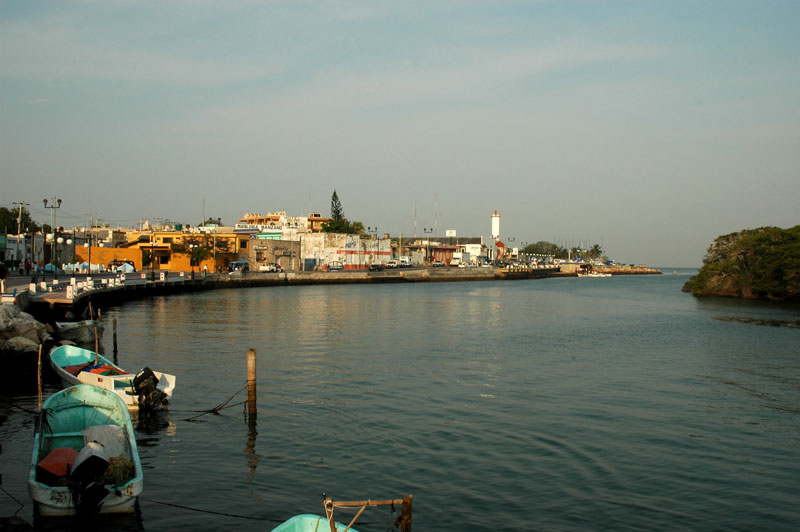

Location
- Country: Mexico

Physical characteristics
- Mouth: Gulf of Mexico
  - location: Champotón, Campeche
  - coordinates: 19°21′31″N 90°43′22″W

The Champotón River is a river of Mexico.

== See also ==
- List of rivers of Mexico
