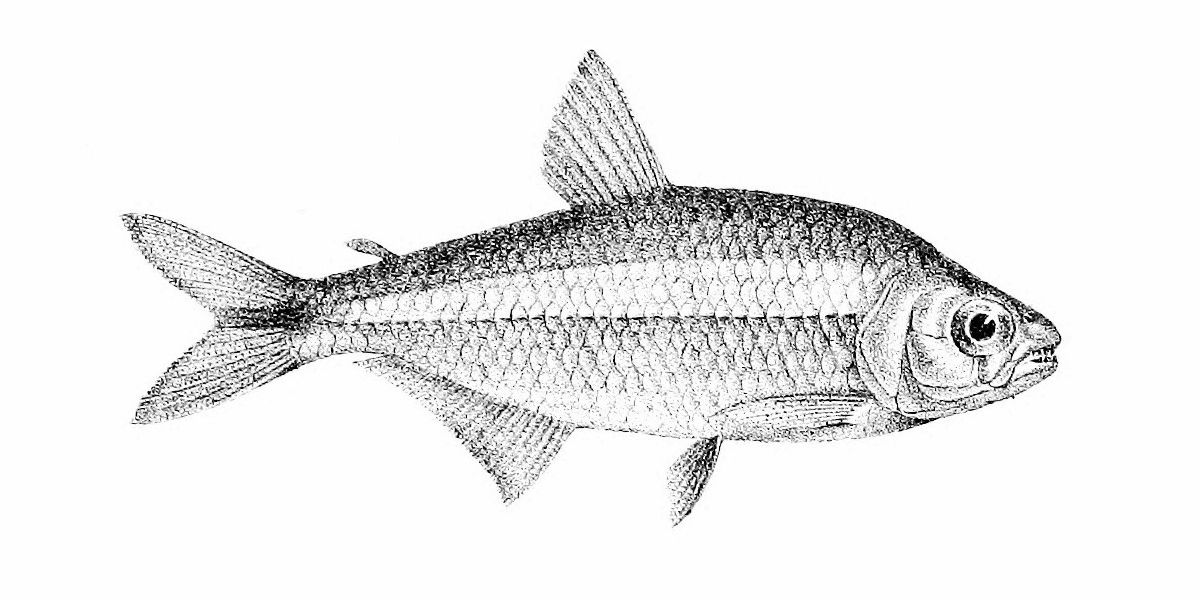
- 1906 illustration

Conservation status
- Least Concern (IUCN 3.1)

Scientific classification
- Kingdom: Animalia
- Phylum: Chordata
- Class: Actinopterygii
- Order: Characiformes
- Family: Acestrorhamphidae
- Genus: Astyanax
- Species: A. angustifrons

Binomial name
- Astyanax angustifrons (Regan, 1908)

Synonyms
- Tetragonopterus angustifrons Regan, 1908

= Astyanax angustifrons =

Species of fish

Astyanax angustifrons, sometimes referred to as the Campeche tetra, is a species of freshwater ray-finned fish belonging to the family Acestrorhamphidae, the American characins. This fish is found in the rivers of Central and South America. It has a healthy distribution across southern Mexico and northern Guatemala, and is relatively common within its native range. Details regarding its diet and behavior are sparse, but it lives in areas with plentiful riparian vegetation, and most other members of the genus are omnivorous. Its habitat includes places affected by pollution and human activity; nonetheless, it is not endangered.

Astyanax angustifrons was once synonymized with congener Astyanax aeneus based on similarity, but this is not accepted by modern ichthyologists. A. angustifrons is also similar to congener A. mexicanus in coloration and several aspects of shape, though it has a shorter snout; this is potentially the origin of its specific epithet, as "angustus" means "narrow" and "frons" means "face".

== Taxonomy ==
Astyanax angustifrons was described in 1908 by British ichthyologist Charles Tate Regan. Regan originally gave it the name Tetragonopterus angustifrons, but this is no longer accepted. It was momentarily considered synonymous with congener Astyanax aeneus, but Mexican ichthyologist Juan J. Schmitter-Soto redescribed the species in 2017 and moved it to the genus Astyanax, where it remains.

There are three subgenera within the genus Astyanax: Astyanax stricto sensu, Poecilurichthys, and Zygogaster. A. angustifrons is considered a member of the first based on the fact that it has a complete predorsal series of scales, making its full scientific name Astyanax (Astyanax) angustifrons.

=== Etymology ===
Astyanax angustifrons has a scientific name in which all allusions are unexplained in the original texts, but whose meanings can be inferred by modern etymologists. Astyanax is a character in Homer's Iliad, a Trojan warrior, and its use as a scientific name is likely in reference to the large, armor-like scales of the type species A. argentatus, A. argentatus was formerly considered a junior synonym of A. mexicanus by taxonomists, although it is now considered to be a valid species which is given the common name of the Texan tetra.) "Angustus" means "narrow" and "frons" means "front" or "face", which is possibly in reference to the smaller snout in comparison to A. mexicanus.

In terms of a common name, A. angustifrons is sometimes referred to as the Campeche tetra. This is due to one of its locales, the Río Mamantel, being located in the Mexican state of Campeche.

== Description ==
Astyanax angustifrons is usually within the range of 23 cm (9 in) SL (standard length). It has 34 to 38 scales in the lateral line, 11 dorsal-fin rays, and 26 to 29 anal-fin rays; the origin of the dorsal fin is behind the base of the ventral fins. The body is middlingly deep, ranging from 27 to 40% SL, and the head is relatively long, from 22 to 37% SL. There is no known sexual dimorphism.

The body of A. angustifrons is olivaceous or dark gray on the back and silver below. It has an inconspicuous humeral spot and a bluish-silver lateral stripe. In coloration, it strongly resembles congener A. mexicanus. There is a dark blotch on the caudal peduncle. The fins vary in color, with touches of red towards the front of the anal and pelvic fins and a yellow caudal fin. The rest of the fins are largely clear.

When preserved in alcohol, the entire body turns brassy or yellowish, and the humeral and caudal-peduncle spots are no longer evident, though the lateral stripe remains lighter than the surrounding scales.

== Distribution and habitat ==
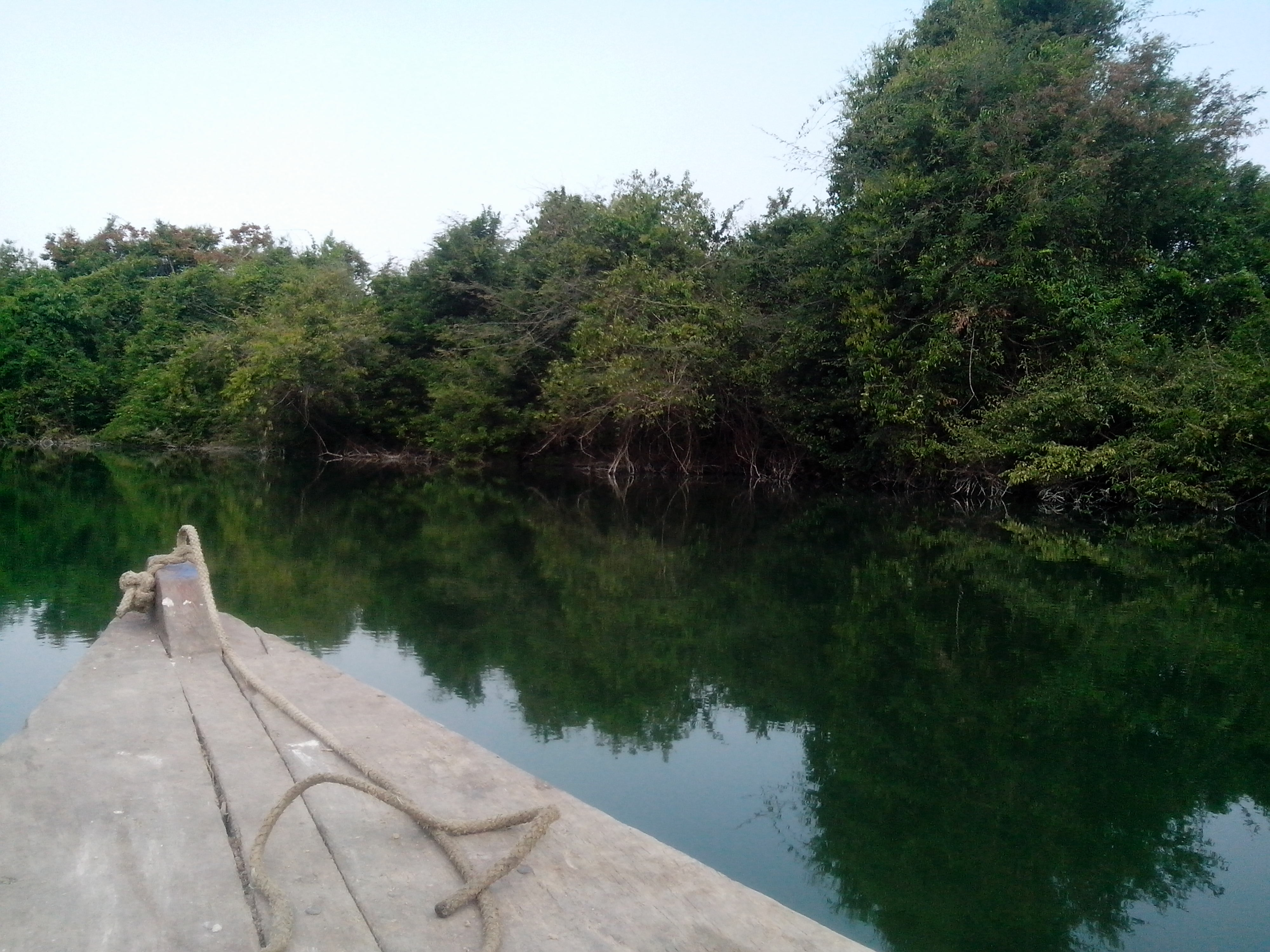
Río San Pedro, one of the habitats of A. angustifrons

The type locality is uncertain, only described as somewhere in Mexico in the nominal text, but future specimens from Guatemala broadened this range. Currently, A. angustifrons is known to be common in Mexico and Guatemala, with a fairly wide distribution.

Specific locales in Guatemala include the Arroyo Subín and the Río San Pedro. In Mexico, they include the Río Champotón, Río Mamantel, and Río Ulumán. One of these, the Mamantel, flows into a large lagoon known as Laguna de Términos.

Details regarding specific habitat needs are sparse; however, information regarding particular locations can convey where A. angustifrons prefers to live. For example, the Arroyo Subín (sometimes called the Rio El Subín) has plentiful riparian vegetation along several stretches of riverbank, potentially a food source for the aquatic wildlife. The Rio Champotón is somewhat similar, with some mangrove swamps downstream and medium perennial rainforest in the majority of the rest of the basin.

== Diet and ecology ==
Little has been published regarding how A. angustifrons interacts with its environment, but some of its preferences can be discerned from the origins of collected specimens, which are often in waterways with relatively high riparian zone health. Other members of the genus in areas of healthy riparian vegetation consume plentiful allochthonous material; examples include Astyanax altiparanae and Astyanax abramis, both of which are omnivorous and adaptable. Given its range and genus, A. angustifrons potentially has similar feeding patterns.

== Conservation status ==
The IUCN considers A. angustifrons a species of least concern. Its distribution is fair, and while it does occasionally face threats from various invasive species and from pollutants like oil, these threats are localized, and it remains common and widespread. One of its habitats, the San Pedro River, is a part of a protected region in Guatemala, the Laguna del Tigre National Park, which offers it an extra buffer.

One example of pollution is the Rio El Subín, which is part of the Grijalva–Usumacinta watershed. Due to human activity like waste disposal and bathing, as well as contamination from plastics and pesticides, it is considered a highly polluted waterway.
