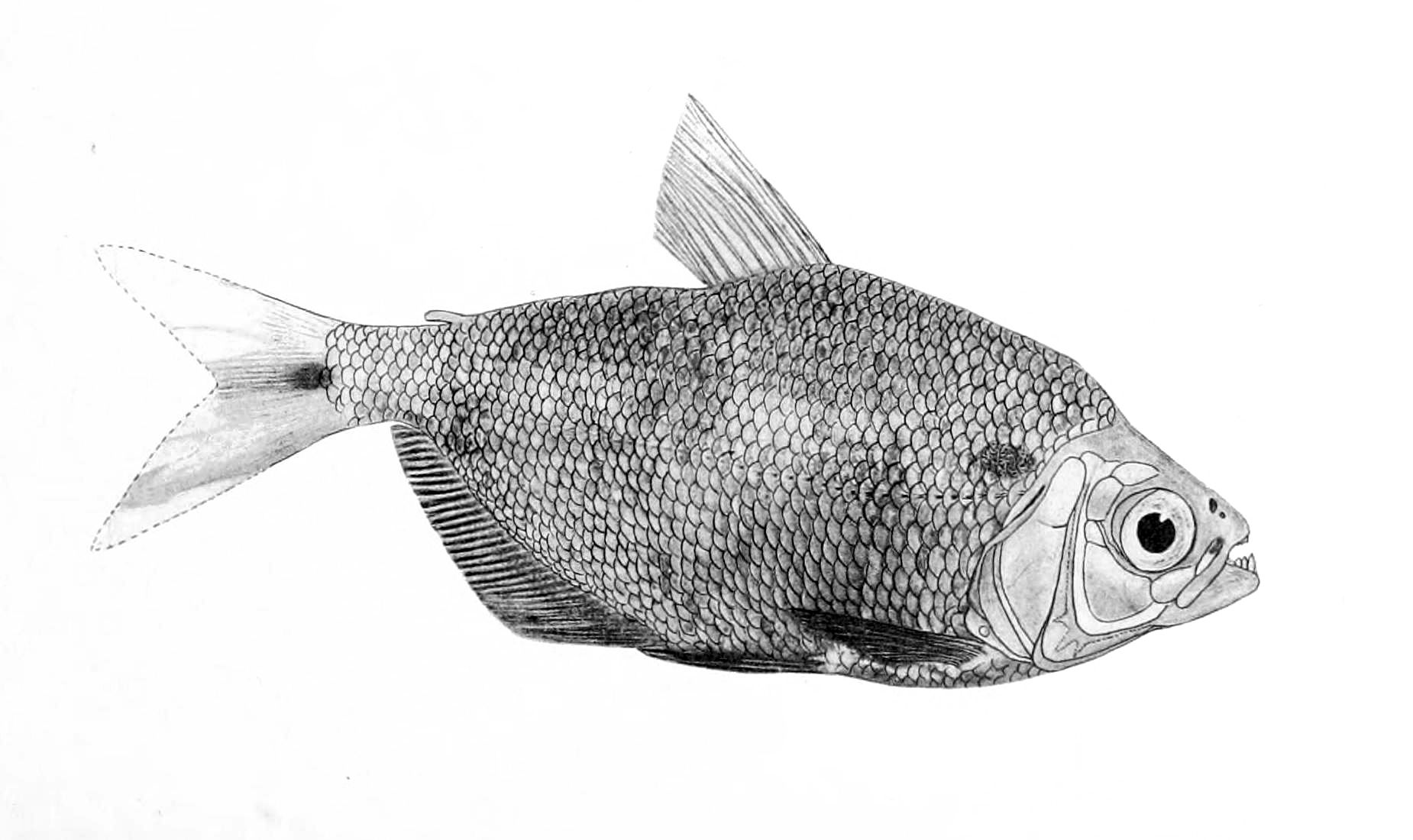
- 1917 illustration

Conservation status
- Least Concern (IUCN 3.1)

Scientific classification
- Kingdom: Animalia
- Phylum: Chordata
- Class: Actinopterygii
- Order: Characiformes
- Family: Acestrorhamphidae
- Genus: Astyanax
- Species: A. bourgeti

Binomial name
- Astyanax bourgeti C. H. Eigenmann, 1908

= Astyanax bourgeti =

Species of fish

Astyanax bourgeti is a species of freshwater ray-finned fish belonging to the family Acestrorhamphidae, the American characins. This fish is found in the upper Amazon river in Brazil. Originally described in 1908, it is not a particularly well-studied member of the genus Astyanax, but there is enough information available to establish a native range, an appearance, and potential relationships to congeners; for example, A. bourgeti is a known member of the subgenus Poecilurichthys, and has been considered such for most of its existence. Biotope preferences, sympatry, diet, and behavior are all unknown.

Its gray scales, dark humeral spot, and silver lateral stripe are not uncommon features within the genus, but A. bourgeti can be told apart from congeners by means including the number scales in the lateral line and the number of anal-fin rays. It also has a smaller, silver spot slightly above and behind the normal humeral spot, which isn't as common as its other markings. Besides this, it also has darkened anal, pelvic, and ventral fins, which are somewhat unusual for a species of Astyanax.

== Taxonomy ==
Astyanax bourgeti was originally described by German-American ichthyologist Carl H. Eigenmann in 1908, as one of various nomenclatural acts performed based upon the Thayer Expedition to Brazil, which was an 1865 trip directed by Swiss-American biologist Louis Agassiz. Since then, its scientific name has not changed, and it has no known synonyms, with the exception of an occasional reference as A. boulengeri instead.

There are three subgenera in Astyanax (Astyanax, Poecilurichthys, and Zygogaster); of these, A. bourgeti belongs to Poecilurichthys.

=== Etymology ===
The specific name "bourgeti" is to honor the collaborator responsible for collecting the type specimens, a French naturalist living in Rio de Janeiro simply credited as "Monsieur Bourget" in the original description and as "D. Bourget" in the accounts of the original voyage to Brazil. Further research unearths naturalist Jean-Baptiste Dieudonné Bourget as the likely identity of this namesake.

Astyanax bourgeti lacks a common name, but is one of various small fishes referred to as "sardinita" in Spanish and "piaba" in Portuguese.

== Description ==
Astyanax bourgeti reaches 9.2 cm (3.6 in) total length. The snout is pointed, and the jaw is roughly the same length as the eye. There are 11 rays on the dorsal fin, 34 rays on the anal fin, and roughly 53 scales in the lateral line. The high number of lateral-line scales is a feature shared with congeners Astyanax cordovae and Astyanax microlepis, as well as Astyanax elachylepis; the lattermost of these can be readily differentiated from A. bourgeti due to the lower number of anal-fin rays on A. elachylepis. Sexual dimorphism is unknown.

Astyanax bourgeti is a base silver color, and has a distinct dark humeral spot in a flattened oval shape, with a smaller silvery spot above the upper-back edge of the first. It has a narrow lateral stripe in rather faint silver. Its anal fin is a uniform dark color, and its pectoral and ventral fins also sport conspicuous pigmentation, though not as uniform. There is no spot on the caudal peduncle directly, which can help differentiate A. bourgeti from some congeners, but the middle rays of the caudal fin remain darkened. There may be an "echo" of the humeral spot behind the first, not often well-defined; this marking is shared with several species known to be in the Astyanax bimaculatus species complex, such as Astyanax abramis and Astyanax orthodus, which both demonstrate a well-defined humeral spot and faint vertical bars in the humeral region.

== Distribution and ecology ==
Astyanax bourgeti is a species endemic to the Amazon basin, found only within the main channel of the Amazon river. Specifically, it is found in the upper Amazon, in the portions sometimes referred to as the Solimões. The type specimen was originally collected from the Solimões at Tabatinga, Brazil, in 1865. Little is known of specific biotope preferences, or of diet and sympatry.

The Solimões river is an alluvial river with heavy sediment carry. (Alluvial rivers are rivers without a single set form, due to flowing through loose substrate that is easily affected by floods in the region.) Its channels have not demonstrated high amounts of movement, as they are held in by the cliffs of the Alter do Chão Formation. The sediments carried in the Solimões are often rich in nutrients, which contributes to the biodiversity of the Amazon.

== Conservation status ==
Astyanax bourgeti has been evaluated by the IUCN Red List as "Least Concern". The Brazilian ecological organization Chico Mendes Institute for Biodiversity Conservation gave it a data deficient listing in 2014 due to its generally understudied nature. There is already security for the species, however, in the form of the Central Amazon Conservation Complex, which has its approximate center at the confluence of the Solimões and Negro rivers. Because of the region's protected status, the area - and therefore A. bourgeti - is not at particular risk, as far as conservation goes.
