= Astyanax apiaka =

Conservation status
- Data Deficient (IUCN 3.1)

Scientific classification
- Kingdom: Animalia
- Phylum: Chordata
- Class: Actinopterygii
- Division: Teleostei
- Order: Characiformes
- Family: Acestrorhamphidae
- Genus: Astyanax
- Species: A. apiaka

Binomial name
- Astyanax apiaka Ferreira, F. C. T. Lima, Ribeiro, Flausino Junior, Machado & Mirande, 2023

Species of fish

Astyanax apiaka is a species of freshwater ray-finned fish belonging to the family Acestrorhamphidae, the American characins. This fish is endemic to the Apiacá River in Mato Grosso, Brazil. It is one of the more recently described members of the genus, which results in little published research of its natural behaviors or preferred biotopes. However, descriptions of its appearance and general environment have been solidified, as well as some baseline information regarding its diet. The International Union for the Conservation of Nature considers it a data deficient species.

== Taxonomy ==
Astyanax apiaka was first described in April 2023 by a group of scientists from Brazil & Argentina; it has no known synonyms. It is believed to be most closely related to Astyanax moorii, based on molecular analysis, and is otherwise related to the Astyanax bimaculatus species-group and the Astyanax orthodus species-group. The clade formed by A. apiaka and A. moorii is considered a sister clade to the A. bimaculatus and A. orthodus clades. The monophyly of the genus Astyanax has been challenged in recent phylogenetic analyses, with some species transferred to other genera such as Deuterodon, Eretmobrycon, and Psalidodon.

=== Etymology ===
The genus name "Astyanax" is an allusion to the Iliad, a Greek epic poem wherein Astyanax was a warrior of Troy. The reasoning behind this was not provided in the original text, but modern etymologists believe it to originate in the appearance of the type species, Astyanax argentatus; its scales are large and silvery, comparable to armor or a shield. The specific name "apiaka" is an homage to the Apiaká indigenous group, which inhabits the type locale. It is also the name of the river to which it is endemic, the Río Apiacá.

== Description ==
Astyanax apiaka reaches a maximum of 16.3 cm (6.4 in) SL (standard length, without the tail fin). The body is somewhat deep, with its deepest point at the edge of the dorsal fin; the snout is slightly elongated, especially in comparison to other members of Astyanax, which normally have blunt, short snouts. (Longer jaws are usually associated with predatory behavior, while most species of Astyanax are broadly omnivorous. Several species have longer snouts, which is attributable to trophic pressures associated with piscivory.) There are 43–49 pored scales in the lateral line. There are 12–14 rays in the pectoral fin, 7 rays in the ventral fin, and 24–29 rays in the anal fin; the upper lobe of the caudal fin most often has 11 rays, while the lower usually has 8.

The base scale color is a dark gray-brown on the back, fading to silver on the sides and belly; there is a lateral stripe in yellow. The fins are red or yellow, usually highly pigmented. When preserved in alcohol, the fins turn hyaline (clear), and the lateral stripe turns from yellow to dark. There is a humeral spot that ranges from rounded to horizontally elongated, and a diffuse patch of pigment on the caudal peduncle that continues on the middle fin rays.

One of the easiest ways to tell A. apiaka apart from congeners is by its unusual dentition. Its teeth are multicuspid (many pointed), which is common in Astyanax, but the central cusp is longer and sharper than the others by a distinctive margin, which is not common. Further, it has a greater number of teeth in the maxilla: 4–9 as opposed to 0–3 in other species.

=== Sexual dimorphism ===
Mature male specimens of A. apiaka exhibit two to four body hooks on select rays of the anal fin. This is not uncommon for members of Astyanax; other species may also have similar hooks on the ventral and pectoral fins. A small handful of species, such as Astyanax bagual, develop these hooks on the rays of every fin.

== Distribution and ecology ==
Astyanax apiaka has only been recorded from its namesake, the Río Apiacá in northern Brazil. It was originally collected from locales with rocky substrate and a fast current. The holotype of A. apiaka (CPUFMT 7654, 147 mm SL) was collected from the rio Cabeça de Boi, a tributary of the rio Apiacás in Mato Grosso State, Brazil. Studies on Astyanax assemblages in central Brazil show that many species favor clear, shallow, and fast-flowing habitats with rocky substrates, conditions that match the known environment of the Apiacá River.

In similar rheophiles, individuals occupy midwater positions to intercept drifting prey, meaning that A. apiaka may function as a midwater drift-feeder. In the mid-Teles Pires River—within the same basin where A. apiaka occurs—piscivorous fishes dominate the community in biomass and abundance, followed by herbivorous, insectivorous, and omnivorous species. Most available food resources are native, including aquatic insects and other invertebrates. Across the river's hydrological cycle, the overall trophic structure remains stable, although omnivorous species show marked seasonal variation in abundance.

Fragments of fish and some terrestrial insects (largely ants, family Formicidae) have been found in examined stomach contents.

== Conservation status ==
Astyanax apiaka is considered a data deficient species by the IUCN. Three hydroelectric dams have been built in its native range, which is known to be restricted, but effects on the upstream environment appear to have been minimally disruptive. Nonetheless, the health of the general species population remains unknown.

Human populations living in the same area have tested positive for mercury exposure, likely originating in the fish that come from the local rivers. Mercury is sometimes used in the process of harvesting gold from natural rock, and the Río Apiacá is known to have gold deposits; environmental pressures upon A. apiaka and sympatric species may arise in the form of contaminants from mining activity.

== Life history ==
Although no direct study has examined reproduction in A. apiaka, its close relative A. bimaculatus shows two spawning peaks annually—one at the end of winter and another in summer—which may reflect a general pattern within the genus Astyanax.

In a study of four Characidae species from the upper Tocantins River, Astyanax bimaculatus had a diet dominated by allochthonous (terrestrial) items, while autochthonous items dominated other species — implying Astyanax spp. may exploit terrestrial-insect inputs heavily. The diet of Astyanax spp. in stream habitats can include adult and immature insects of both autochthonous and allochthonous origin, suggesting a flexible trophic strategy in flowing water. In A. intermedius, feeding patterns varied seasonally even if food intake was not strongly correlated with rainfall, while body condition and reproductive investment did show relationships to hydrological variables. Fragments of fish and some terrestrial insects (largely ants, family Formicidae) have been found in examined stomach contents.

Although specific age/growth data for many Astyanax species are scarce, the rapid onset of maturity and fractional spawning in A. scabripinnis suggest a life-history strategy favouring early reproduction over longevity. Stream-dwelling characids in tropical systems often follow an r-selected strategy (rapid maturation, frequent reproduction) — it is plausible that A. apiaka conforms to this pattern.
