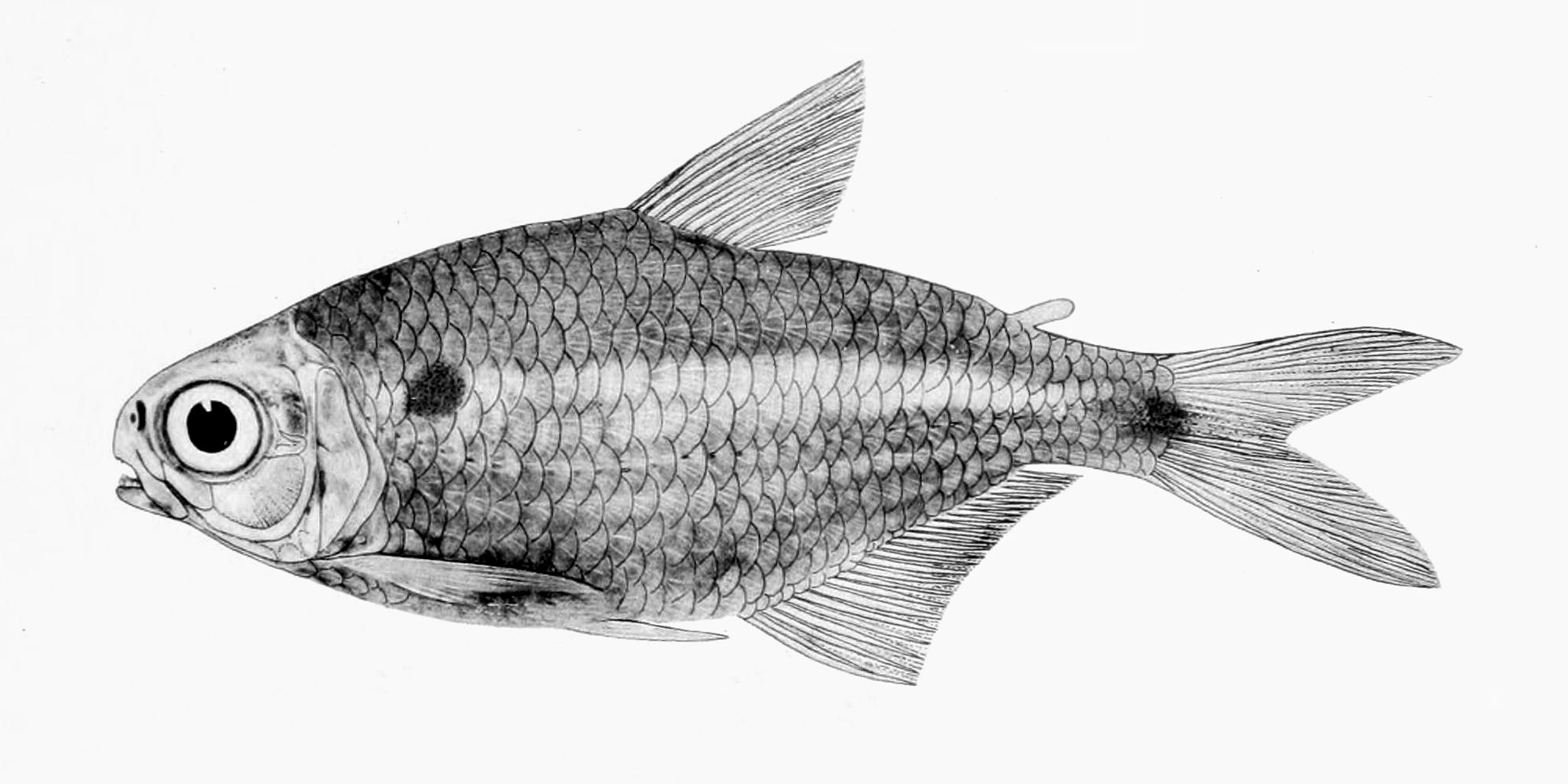
- 1917 illustration

Conservation status
- Data Deficient (IUCN 3.1)

Scientific classification
- Kingdom: Animalia
- Phylum: Chordata
- Class: Actinopterygii
- Order: Characiformes
- Family: Acestrorhamphidae
- Genus: Astyanax
- Species: A. brevirhinus

Binomial name
- Astyanax brevirhinus C. H. Eigenmann, 1908

= Astyanax brevirhinus =

Species of fish

Astyanax brevirhinus is a species of freshwater ray-finned fish belonging to the family Acestrorhamphidae, the American characins. This fish is known only from a river basin in northeastern Brazil. It is somewhat understudied and lacks a conservation status, but it is present in a region that is the subject of an ecological restoration project - the Jequitinhonha River. Specifics of diet and behavior are unknown, though shoaling activity has been observed in laboratory conditions.

The species name "brevirhinus" means "short nose"; this is because A. brevirhinus can be told apart from several congeners by its abbreviated snout length. Other factors, such as a lateral stripe and horizontal humeral spot, are shared with other Astyanax species, but aspects of dentition and fin structure can be used to differentiate. Nonetheless, these and other aspects - such as the deep body and silver scales - are not uncommon features within Astyanax as a whole.

== Taxonomy ==
Astyanax brevirhinus was first cataloged by prolific German-American ichthyologist Carl H. Eigenmann in 1908. The type specimen, however, was collected much earlier; during the Thayer Expedition to Brazil, an ecological and biological endeavor undertaken by multiple scientists, took place in 1865, and resulted in various type specimens that were later recognized as new species by those that had attended. (Another example is a congener of A. brevirhinus, Astyanax bourgeti.) The original description of A. brevirhinus was somewhat brief, but it received a more detailed update from Eigenmann in the 1921 volume of "The American Characidae", a series of articles published in the journal Memoirs of the Museum of Comparative Zoology at Harvard College and later compiled into a book.

Astyanax brevirhinus has not undergone any notable taxonomic changes during its existence as a species, and lacks any known synonyms.

=== Etymology ===
The specific name "brevirhinus" means "short-nosed". This is in reference to the particularly short snout that helps differentiate A. brevirhinus from its congeners. The genus name "Astyanax", while slightly less clear, is linked to the Iliad; Astyanax was a Trojan warrior, and son of Prince Hector. The reason for this allusion, while not articulated in the nominal text, is thought to refer to the type species Astyanax argentatus, which has large, silvery scales, like armor or a shield.

Astyanax brevirhinus lacks a common name, but "shortsnout astyanax" has been suggested based upon physical traits and the specific epithet.

== Description ==
Astyanax brevirhinus reaches a maximum of roughly 10.0 cm (3.9 in) TL (total length, with the tail fin included). The holotype specimen was 6.8 cm (2.7 in) SL (standard length, excluding the tail fin). The body is about 2.5 times as long as its depth, which makes for a fairly deep-bodied fish. The snout is notably short. The body is deepest at the point just after the start of the dorsal fin. There are 6 scale rows above, 35 scales in, and 4 scale rows below the lateral line. There are 11 rays in the dorsal fin, and 28 rays in the anal fin. The premaxillary has between three and five teeth on each side, which can help differentiate A. brevirhinus from similar species with fewer teeth, such as Deuterodon burgerai (which was originally placed in Astyanax, and has only two or three teeth in the same position).

The body is a base silvery color. There is one humeral blotch, which is either rounded or horizontally elongated, and a dark lateral stripe that meets a blotch of dark pigment on the caudal peduncle. This blotch extends through the median caudal-fin rays. (When preserved in alcohol, the dark lateral band turns silver, and the humeral spot becomes obscured.) The caudal fin is mostly a middling-dark opaque color, while the middle rays are darkened (especially towards the tips). When in distress, such as during laboratory transport or in conditions perceived as threatening, individuals of A. brevirhinus may slightly darken in color.

=== Sexual dimorphism ===
Male specimens of A. brevirhinus exhibit bony hooks on the rays of the anal and pelvic fins. This is a feature seen on most species of Astyanax, though some demonstrate bony hooks on all fins instead of just the pelvic and anal. Otherwise, no morphometric or coloration differences are known between the sexes of A. brevirhinus.

== Distribution and ecology ==
Astyanax brevirhinus is endemic to the Jequitinhonha River basin in Brazil. The holotype specimen was collected along the Jequitinhonha valley during the Thayer expedition in 1865–66. Its preferred water parameters appear to be within the pH range of 6.2–7.5, and the temperature range of 23 °C (73 °F); tests with higher water temperatures upon captive specimens have resulted erratic swimming behavior and difficulty staying close to the surface of the water.

Observation in laboratory conditions reveals shoaling behavior amongst conspecifics of A. brevirhinus, not uncommon in species of Astyanax (both captive and wild). Otherwise, little has been published of the species' diet or behavior. It is known to live in the same river basin as congener Astyanax turmalinensis, but sympatric behavior has not been observed. Other congeners within a similar general region include Astyanax lacustris, Astyanax jacobinae, and Astyanax epiagos, all from rivers to the northeast of Brazil.

== Conservation status ==
Astyanax brevirhinus has been classified as data deficient by the IUCN. Without further knowledge of its distribution, biology, and general population trends, a definite conservation status cannot be ascertained. Previous diamond mining activity in the Jequitinhonha River region has been met with an ongoing preservation project in hopes of restoring local flora and fauna diversity, but the prognosis is not entirely positive; the riparian zone has been deemed unlikely to return to its former health. However, efforts have not been entirely without payoff, and the riparian zone has had some recovery in the past 7 to 11 years, which means that aquatic species like A. brevirhinus are likely to retain the associated benefits if the trend continues.
