= Cave tetra =

Cave tetra may refer to different species of fish:

- Astyanax jordani
- Mexican tetra (Astyanax mexicanus')
