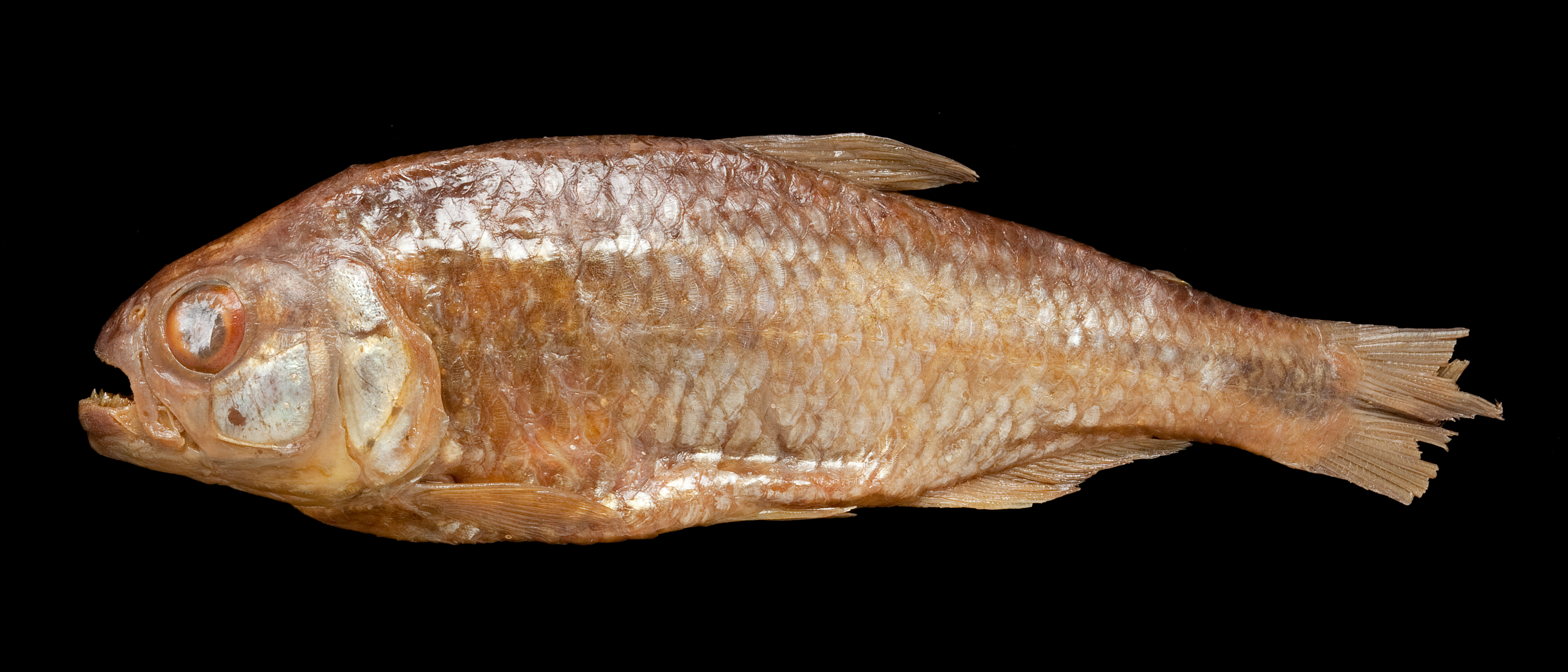
- Preserved specimen

Conservation status
- Least Concern (IUCN 3.1)

Scientific classification
- Kingdom: Animalia
- Phylum: Chordata
- Class: Actinopterygii
- Order: Characiformes
- Family: Acestrorhamphidae
- Genus: Astyanax
- Species: A. brevimanus

Binomial name
- Astyanax brevimanus (Günther, 1864)

Synonyms
- Tetragonopterus brevimanus Günther, 1864; Tetragonopterus cobanensis Bocourt, 1868

= Astyanax brevimanus =

Species of fish

Astyanax brevimanus, sometimes referred to as the Quiché tetra, is a species of freshwater ray-finned fish belonging to the family Acestrorhamphidae, the American characins. This fish is found in various locales in Guatemala. Its native range is somewhat restricted, but it is a populous and adaptable species, so there is no risk of it going extinct anytime soon. It is unknown what A. brevimanus eats, or what specific habitats it prefers; current information is largely in the form of physical descriptions, general areas of occurrence, and hypotheses regarding relationships to congeners. Its silvery scales, indistinct humeral (shoulder) spot, and dark caudal-peduncle spot are features not unusual in species of Astyanax.

Dietary preferences, biotope preferences, and mating practices are all lacking in published research, but its taxonomy has been closely examined; originally named as a member of genus Tetragonopterus, A. brevimanus was considered synonymous with other species from Tetragonopterus, and then Astyanax, for a long while before finally being given its current designation in 2017 as part of a redescription. Its former position as an obsolete species is largely thanks to various morphological similarities shared within the genus.

== Taxonomy ==
When first described by German-British zoologist Albert Günther in 1864, A. brevimanus was placed in the genus Tetragonopterus. It remained under the name Tetragonopterus brevimanus for a great deal of its existence as a species. Another species was also named, Tetragonopterus cobanensis, to later be synonymized with A. brevimanus (when it still belonged to Tetragonopterus). Based upon morphological similarities, American zoologist Edward Drinker Cope posited a possible relationship between A. brevimanus and congener Astyanax argentatus (which was sometimes referred to as Tetragonopterus argentatus).

For many years, T. brevimanus was thought to be a name mistakenly applied to specimens of either Astyanax mexicanus (sometimes called Tetragonopterus mexicanus in the relevant publications) or Psalidodon fasciatus (which was mostly known as Astyanax fasciatus or Tetragonopterus fasciatus at the time). British ichthyologist Charles Tate Regan considered it synonymous with Astyanax mexicanus as early as 1906. German-American ichthyologist Carl H. Eigenmann considered it synonymous with Astyanax aeneus in 1921 (which was then known as a subspecies of Astyanax fasciatus, A. f. aeneus).

In 2017, a study of taxonomy by Mexican ichthyologist Juan J. Schmitter-Soto resurrected the species from synonymy and placed it into the genus Astynax, which is where it stands today. Some resources, such as the Global Biodiversity Information Facility, still list it as a synonym for A. mexicanus; other databases, such as FishBase and the World Register of Marine Species, reflect its current valid status. Given the relatively recent return of the species into validity, this discrepancy is not surprising.

=== Etymology ===
The genus name "Astyanax" is an allusion to the Iliad, in which Astyanax was a Trojan warrior. This is thought to originate in the type species of the genus, Astyanax argentatus. Its scales are large and silvery, and therefore comparable to armor or a shield. The specific name "brevimanus" means "short-handed" (as in "brief" and "manual"); this is in reference to the fact that the pectoral fins of the species do not reach the origin of the ventral fins.

Astyanax brevimanus is sometimes called the Quiché tetra (kee-SHAY), or sardinita del Quiché in Spanish. This is a reference to the Quiché Department of Guatemala, which is not the type locality of the species but does host a significant population.

== Description ==
Astyanax brevimanus can reach a maximum of 8.17 cm (3.22 in) standard length (SL). The body is slender, with a depth of 29–36% of the standard length, and the head takes up roughly a quarter of the body, 24–29% SL. The eyes are large, occupying 24–34% of the head's length (HL). There are 11 dorsal-fin rays, 21–23 anal-fin rays, and 38 scales in the lateral line. Sexual dimorphism is unknown.

Most of the scales are a reflective silver, with a touch of brown on the back and some yellow in the fins, which are mostly transparent otherwise; this is with the exception of some mild red coloration on the front-basal portion of the anal, dorsal, and pelvic fins. There is also a dark patch on the middle caudal-fin rays as a result of a dark spot on the caudal peduncle. A. brevimanus sports a humeral spot that can be p-shaped or indistinct. Upon preservation in alcohol, the humeral spot is likely to vanish altogether, and the caudal-peduncle spot becomes more faint; all scales turn a bronze or yellowish color.

== Distribution and ecology ==
Astyanax brevimanus was originally described from several locales in Guatemala, including the Rio Jerónimo municipality of the Baja Verapaz department. Several holotypes were collected from the Lake Izabal region, but these were later determined to be specimens of congener Astyanax belizianus; A. brevimanus is generally an occupant of highland rivers, while A. belizianus is a lowland species. Currently, the distribution of A. brevimanus is understood to extend from the highlands of Chiapas on the Atlantic slope of Mexico, in upper tributaries of the Río Grijalva, to the departments of Quiché and Baja Verapaz in Guatemala. Little has been published regarding biotope preferences or dietary needs, but other species collected in similar relevant locales include the Usumacinta buffalo (Ictiobus meridionalis), the twoband cichlid (Vieja bifasciata), and the largelip killifish (Tlaloc labialis).

== Conservation status ==
The IUCN currently considers Astyanax brevimanus a species of least concern. While it only occurs in a few locations and has a relatively restricted range, it is not at all uncommon in the relevant areas and is generally considered adaptable. (This tends to be the case for various species of Astyanax.) While it is not a protected species, A. brevimanus does naturally occur in some locations that are protected, which offers it a further buffer against potential population threats.
