= Astyanax microschemos =

Conservation status
- Least Concern (IUCN 3.1)

Scientific classification
- Kingdom: Animalia
- Phylum: Chordata
- Class: Actinopterygii
- Order: Characiformes
- Family: Acestrorhamphidae
- Genus: Astyanax
- Species: A. microschemos

Binomial name
- Astyanax microschemos Bertaco & C. A. S. Lucena, 2006

Species of fish

Astyanax microschemos is a species of freshwater ray-finned fish belonging to the family Acestrorhamphidae, the American characins. This fish is found in Brazil. It belongs to the A. scabripinnis species complex and differs from other species outside it by having a lower number of branched anal fin rays (about 14-18 vs 20-45) and its shallow body depth being about 26.9-29.7 vs more than 35% of its standard length (SL). Compared to species of its own complex, it can be distinguished by the combination of its shallow body depth (ranging from 26.9-29.7% of SL), and smaller interorbital width (26.9-30.4% of its head length). The species name comes from the Greek mikroschemos, meaning "low stature", which refers to the shallow body depth of the animal.

== Description ==
=== Morphology ===
Astyanax microschemos has a compressed and elongate body; the greatest body depth is located anterior to its dorsal fin's origin. The tip of the supraoccipital spine is straight or slightly convex. The profile of its body is convex from the tip of the aforementioned spine to the base of the last dorsalfin ray. The profile along the anal fin's base is posterodorsally slanted. Its caudal peduncle is elongate and almost straight along both margins (dorsal and ventral). Its snout is rounded from the margin of the upper lip through the anterior nostrils. Its head is small. Its lower jaw is longer than the upper jaw. Its maxilla extends posteriorly to vertical through the anterior margin of the orbit, being aligned at an angle of about 45 degrees relative to the longitudinal body axis.

The premaxilla counts with two teeth rows: the outer row has three pentacuspid teeth with the central cusp being longer; five teeth in the inner premaxillary row. The teeth gradually decrease in length, the last tooth being quite smaller. The maxilla counts with two or three teeth with three to five cusps, the central of which is the longest. The central cusp in all teeth is two to three times as long and broad as the other cusps.

The animal possesses 9 dorsal fin rays. Its first unbranched ray is half of the length of its second ray. The distal margin of the dorsal fin is nearly straight, its origin being at the middle of the fish's standard length. The adipose fin is located at the insertion of the base of the last anal fin ray. Anal-fin rays range in number between 15-17. The distal border of the anal fin is smoothly concave. Its pectoral fin rays range between 11-13, while its pelvic fin rays equals 7. The tip of the pelvic fin reaches a posterior portion of the genital opening, rather falling short of the anal fin origin. The caudal fin finds itself forked, with lobes of equal size and possessing 19 principal rays. A. microschemos has 9 to 11 dorsal and 9 to 10 ventral procurrent rays.

The fish's scales are cycloid and moderately large. Its lateral line is a complete one. The number of scales in its lateral line series amount to 36-38; while its total vertebrae are 35-36. Its supraneural bones amount to 5-6, while its gill rakers range from 6-10. Secondary sex characteristics were not found so far.

=== Colouration ===
In alcohol, the dorsal and dorsolateral portions of the fish's head and its body are a dark brown colour. It possesses dark chromatophores scattered on the lateral portion of its head, which are more concentrated on its snout and the anterior border of its eye. Scales on the midlateral surface of its body are bordered with dark brown chromatophores which form a reticulate pattern. Its body shows a black and pigmented, midlateral stripe extending from the humeral region to the base of its middle caudal fin; a faint dark pigmentation is also present in the middle of caudal fin rays. The previously described stripe extends dorsally and ventrally close to the caudal fin base, forming a small caudal spot. The fish also exhibits a solitary black, narrow, and vertically elongate humeral spot, located over the second to fourth lateral line scales and which extends over 2-3 horizontal series of scales. Fins have scattered dark chromatophores.

== Distribution ==
A. microschemos is only known from the river source of the Itapemirim River, in Espírito Santo, eastern Brazil. At the type locality where the animal was first described, the river is approximately 2 metres (6.6 ft) wide, with the córrego Palmital is about 2 m wide, with riparian vegetation, and a stony substrate. Astyanax microschemos was collected together with Characidium, Neoplecostomus and Trichomycterus species.
