= Astyanax tarpon =

Conservation status
- Vulnerable (IUCN 3.1)

Scientific classification
- Kingdom: Animalia
- Phylum: Chordata
- Class: Actinopterygii
- Order: Characiformes
- Family: Acestrorhamphidae
- Genus: Astyanax
- Species: A. tarpon

Binomial name
- Astyanax tarpon (C. H. Eigenmann, 1912)

Synonyms
- Genycharax tarpon Eigenmann, 1912

Species of fish

Astyanax tarpon is a species of freshwater ray-finned fish belonging to the family Acestrorhamphidae, the American characins. This fish is endemic to Colombia, where it is found in the upper Rio Cauca. It is sometimes allocated to the monospecific genus Genycharax.
