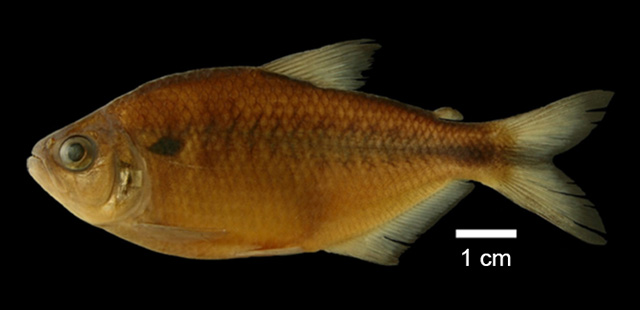
- Preserved specimen; scale bar 1 cm

Scientific classification
- Kingdom: Animalia
- Phylum: Chordata
- Class: Actinopterygii
- Order: Characiformes
- Family: Acestrorhamphidae
- Genus: Astyanax
- Species: A. boliviensis

Binomial name
- Astyanax boliviensis Ruiz-C., Román-Valencia, Taphorn, Buckup & Ortega, 2018

= Astyanax boliviensis =

Species of fish

Astyanax boliviensis is a species of freshwater ray-finned fish belonging to the family Acestrorhamphidae, the American characins. This fish is found in a handful of rivers in northern Bolivia. Its scientific name is an allusion to its range, which includes the Candelaria, Madidi, and Mamoré rivers. Though it lacks a conservation status from the IUCN, a significant portion of its habitat is contained within the Madidi National Park, one of the largest protected regions in the world.

Described in 2018, A. boliviensis is affiliated with eight other species, all of which are part of a species group centered around congener Astyanax orthodus. It shares several visual aspects with multiple species therein, but has its own diagnostic features, including a silver lateral stripe overlaid by a repeated pattern of chevron-shaped markings. Aside from its general species relationships, its range, and its appearance, little has been published regarding other aspects of A. boliviensis, such as behavior and diet.

== Taxonomy ==
Astyanax boliviensis was described in 2018 by a group of five ichthyologists during a revision of the species-group surrounding congener Astyanax orthodus. It currently has no known scientific synonyms, retaining its original designation; further, it lacks a common name. Before being recognized as its own species, specimens of A. boliviensis originating from the Madeira river were thought to be examples of congener Astyanax villwocki.

Astyanax boliviensis is one of nine species that make up the Astyanax orthodus species group. The others include Astyanax orthodus, Astyanax bopiensis, Astyanax embera, Astyanax gandhiae, Astyanax moorii, Astyanax superbus, Astyanax villwocki, and Astyanax yariguies.

=== Etymology ===
Because A. boliviensis is endemic to Bolivia, its specific name originates therein; the suffix "-ensis" denotes presence in or affiliation with a location. The genus Astyanax has a name which is an allusion to the Iliad, in which a Trojan warrior named Astyanax appeared. The reason for this allusion was not made clear by Spencer Fullerton Baird and Charles Frédéric Girard when they named the genus, but it may originate in the scales of type species, Astyanax argentatus, which are large and silver, like armor or a shield.

== Description ==
Astyanax boliviensis can reach roughly 9 cm (3.5 in) standard length (SL). The lateral line has 39–42 scales. There are 10–14 rays in the pectoral fin, 6–7 in the pelvic fin, and 23–30 in the anal fin. The dorsal lobe of the caudal fin has 12–14 rays, and the ventral lobe has 10, making for 22–24 rays total in the caudal fin. The body is somewhat compressed, and is at its greatest depth just past the start of the dorsal fin. No sexual dimorphism is known.

The base body color is a middle silver, as with most Astyanax, and includes a lighter belly, as well as a reflective silver lateral stripe. The upper half of the body turns a chestnut-brown upon preservation in alcohol, while the lower half turns yellowish; the silver stripe remains prominent. The fins are largely hyaline (clear), though may be slightly grayish.

Unlike several other members of the genus Astyanax, A. boliviensis has no dark lateral stripe; it does, however, have a series of prominent chevron markings that extend down either side. These chevrons are extended at either end to connect to the next marking, creating a continuous pattern that overlays a silver lateral stripe rather than a dark one. There is also a dark spot on the caudal peduncle; the only member of the Astyanax orthodus species group not to have a caudal-peduncle marking is A. ghandiae. This spot can extend up to the origin of the anal fin, but no further. A. boliviensis also has a dark humeral spot with a somewhat polygonal shape, and another humeral spot becomes more obvious upon preservation in alcohol.

== Distribution and habitat ==
Astyanax boliviensis was originally described from a small stream inside the Iturralde Province of Bolivia. Today, it is also known to also be found in the Madidi and Mamoré rivers, which are both tributaries of the Madeira river. Specific biotope preferences, as well as diet and sympatry, are unknown.

The Maderia basin hosts a large portion of the Llanos de Moxos floodplain, which is a patchwork-esque spread of savanna and wetland biomes. There are also occasional patches of forest. The Mamoré river is found in the same lowlands as a large portion of these floodplains. To the southwest, the Madidi river is surrounded by savannas as well, and further by lowland rainforest.

== Conservation status ==
Astyanax boliviensis has not been evaluated by the IUCN. However, a great deal of its native range is contained within the protected Madidi National Park, which hosts the highest observed biodiversity of terrestrial animals. High biodiversity is also known in the relevant ichthyofauna, with over 300 recorded fish species, including A. boliviensis. Due to its presence in areas with notable conservation histories, A. boliviensis is most likely not at risk of going extinct.
