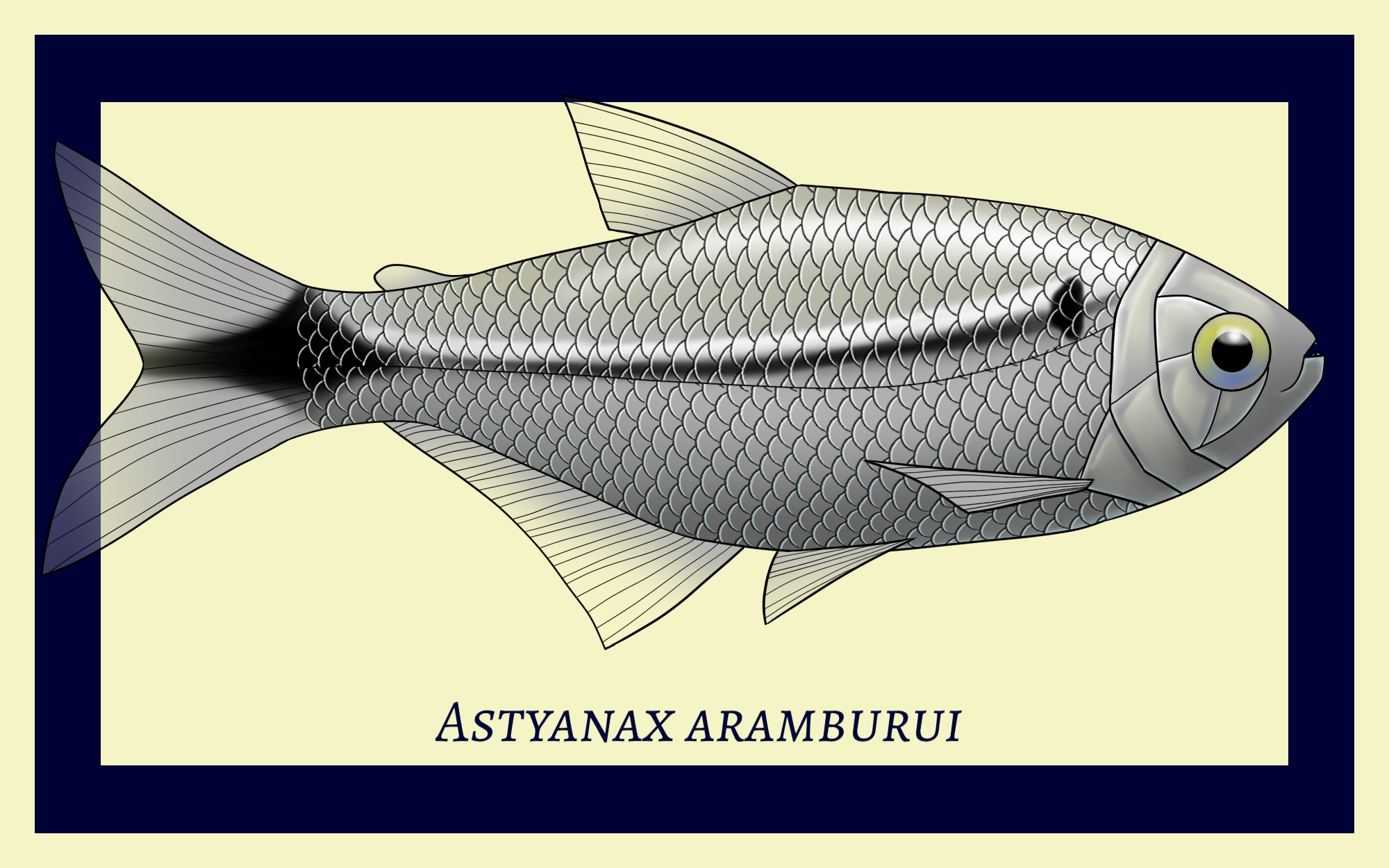

Conservation status
- Near Threatened (IUCN 3.1)

Scientific classification
- Kingdom: Animalia
- Phylum: Chordata
- Class: Actinopterygii
- Order: Characiformes
- Family: Acestrorhamphidae
- Genus: Astyanax
- Species: A. aramburui

Binomial name
- Astyanax aramburui Protogino, Miquelarena & H. L. López, 2006

= Astyanax aramburui =

Species of fish

Astyanax aramburui is a species of freshwater ray-finned fish belonging to the family Acestrorhamphidae, the American characins. This fish is found in the rivers of South America, although it is restricted to a relatively small region within the Paraná and Uruguay river basins of Argentina. It was named after the scientist who established a professional presence for ichthyology in the country, Raúl Arámburu. Considered a near-threatened species by the IUCN, its range includes creeks in a sub-basin affected by various forms of pollution.

Its taxonomy faces some mild debate, but this is not unusual regarding Astyanax as a genus; further, it can be differentiated from various similar congeners by way of several distinctive features. The most notable of these is the presence of small protrusions on the head and scales of sexually mature male specimens, which only have a limited presence in other members of the genus Astyanax. Otherwise, its scales are silver with a touch of yellow, and it has a single black humeral spot. Little has been published about its physiology or feeding habits.

== Taxonomy ==
Astyanax aramburui was first described in 2006 from the Parana and Uruguay river basins by a trio of Argentinian scientists. There are three subgenera currently recognised in Astyanax - Astyanax, Poecilurichthys, and Zygogaster - but it has not been determined to which A. aramburui belongs.

It was momentarily suggested in 2010 that A. aramburui be designated a junior synonym of congener A. rutilus, (before reclassification as Psalidodon rutilus), but both species are still considered valid given numerous morphological and genetic differences. On the other hand, there is genetic evidence to suggest that other currently cryptic species of Astyanax may in fact be junior synonyms of A. aramburui, but research is ongoing. For example, specimens of Astyanax aff. fasciatus collected from Argentina may have been incorrectly identified. This continued confusion has led scientists to suggest further revision of the relevant taxonomy.

=== Etymology ===
The genus name "Astyanax" originates in Homer's Iliad. Astyanax was a Trojan warrior, and the son of Trojan prince Hector; the reason for the allusion possibly lies in the scales of type species Astyanax argentatus, which are large and armor-like. ("Argentatus" means "silver"). The specific epithet "aramburui" is an allusion to ichthyologist Raúl Arámburu, who founded the first chair of ichthyology in Argentina; this is particularly pertinent because A. aramburui is endemic to the country.

In terms of a common name, A. aramburui is one of various small fish species referred to as "Mojarra" in South America. Otherwise, no common names are in wide use by the scientific community.

== Description ==
Astyanax aramburui reaches a maximum of 6.1 cm (2.4 in) SL (standard length). The body is slender, as is the caudal joint, and the head has a short snout and large eye. The maxillary bears a single tooth. The lateral line has 38 to 42 scales, which is a feature that can be used to distinguish A. aramburui from similar congeners. A round or trapezoidal black humeral spot is present above the lateral line. This also can be used to differentiate it from species such as Astyanax powelli, which has two humeral spots in opposition to just one in A. aramburui.

The scales are mostly an iridescent silver with touches of yellow, and there is a scattering of dark color cells (chromatophores) on top of the head and body. The sides of the head and the lateral stripe are both plain silver, ending in a black spot on the caudal peduncle. This spot spreads onto the caudal fin itself, which is largely gray with a darker margin. The first rays of the pectoral fins are dark, but the rest of the fin is hyaline (clear), and the pelvic fin is solely hyaline. The dorsal and anal fins bear scattered black color cells.

=== Sexual dimorphism ===
Mature males of A. aramburui bear bony hooks on all fins. Further, males have small protrusions known as "epidermal breeding tubercles" on a notable proportion of the head and scales, which is unusual in Astyanax and can be used as a characterizing feature of the species. Otherwise, there are no morphometric or coloration differences.

== Distribution and ecology ==
Astyanax aramburui is endemic to Argentina, originally described from the Paraná and Uruguay river systems. Its type locality is part of a relatively extensive section of river, about 50 metres (164 ft) across at its widest, with substrate consisting of mud and clay. Specific locations from whence it has been cited are the Villaguay Creek and Brazo Chico Creek. The river sub-basin in which both creeks are located, the Gualeguay, has relatively high yearly precipitation, averaging 1,311 mm (52 in).

Little is known regarding A. aramburui's dietary needs, but many members of Astyanax are adaptable omnivores.

== Conservation status ==
Astyanax aramburui was considered rare in a 2009 study of the threatened fishes of Argentina, and is listed as a near threatened species on the IUCN Red List; Its relatively restricted range plays a part in both classifications. Threats include pollution from tanneries and meat packing plants in the Gualeguay River basin. The basin is also subject to chemical pollution from various pesticides used in local agriculture.
