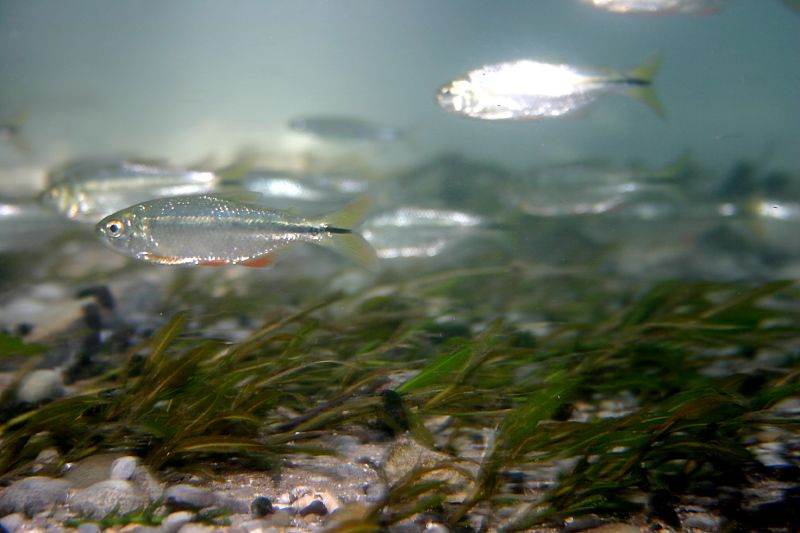
- Astyanax mexicanus

Scientific classification
- Kingdom: Animalia
- Phylum: Chordata
- Class: Actinopterygii
- Order: Characiformes
- Family: Acestrorhamphidae
- Subfamily: Acestrorhamphinae
- Genus: Astyanax; S. F. Baird & Girard, 1854

Type species
- Astyanax argentatus Baird & Girard, 1854

Synonyms
- Poecilurichthys Gill, 1858; Bramocharax Gill, 1877; Genycharax C. H. Eigenmann, 1912; Zygogaster C. H. Eigenmann, 1913; Aequidens Steindachner, 1915; Bertoniolus Fowler, 1918; Evenichthys Whitley, 1935; Anoptichthys Hubbs & Innes, 1936; Catemaco Contreras-Balderas & Rivera-Teillery, 1985

= Astyanax (fish) =

Genus of fishes

Astyanax is a genus of freshwater ray-finned fishes belonging to the family Acestrorhamphidae, the American characins. Some of these fish, like many of their relatives, are kept as aquarium pets and known collectively as tetras. With around 150 described species and new ones being described yearly, this genus is among the largest of the entire order; Hyphessobrycon also has more than 145 species and which one is larger at any one time depends on whether more species have been recently described in one or the other. The blind and colorless cave tetra of Mexico is a famous member of the genus, but its taxonomic position is disputed: Some recognize it as part of the Mexican tetra (A. mexicanus) and this is supported by phylogenetic evidence, but others recognize the cave form as a separate species, A. jordani.

The type species is A. argentatus, which was formerly regarded as a synonym of A. mexicanus. The generic name comes from Astyanax, a character in Greek mythology, who was the son of Hector of Troy; a reference to the large silver scales of the type species, resembling armor.

== Taxonomy and systematics ==
This genus is more or less defined as in 1917 by Carl H. Eigenmann. The lack of comprehensive phylogenetic analyses dealing with this genus is hindering a thorough review and the relationships remain as indeterminate as the monophyly is doubtful. The results of 2020 study using a combination of molecular and morphological data appeared to confirm that Astyanax is not monophyletic and suggested the creation of two new genera and the resurrection of Psalidodon.

== Species ==
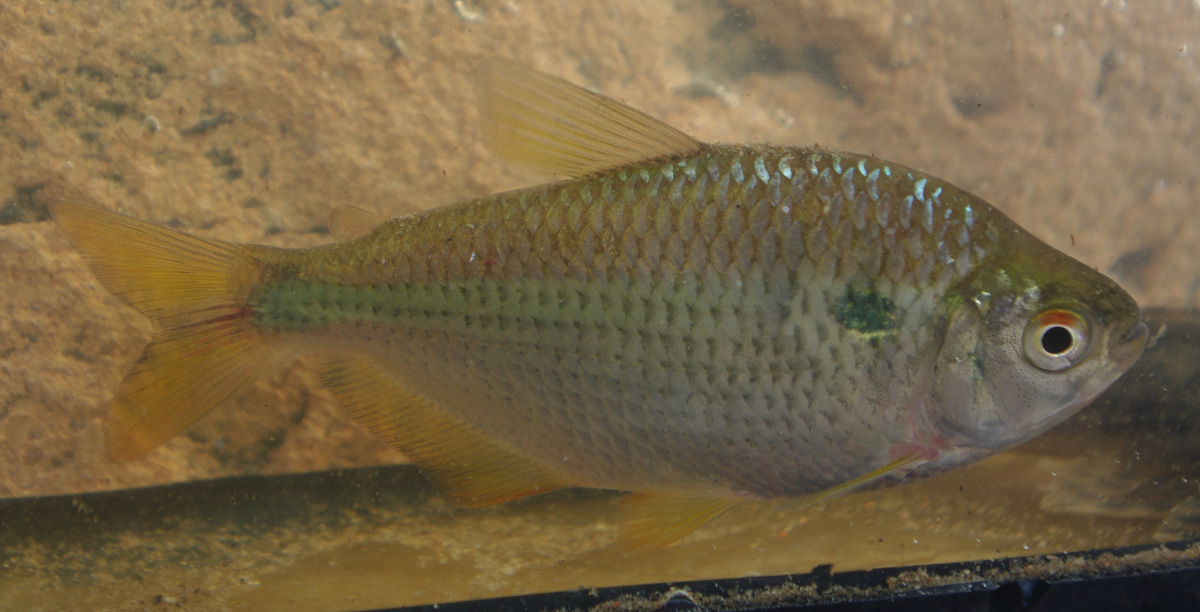
A. abramis

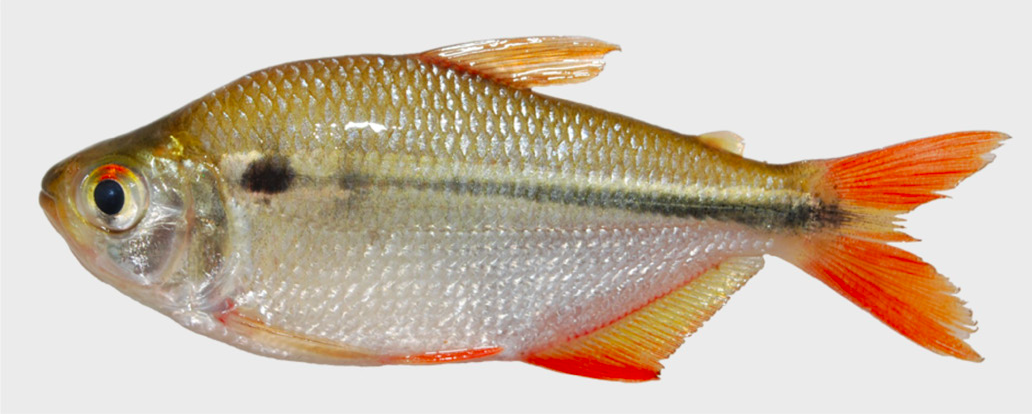
A. argyrimarginatus

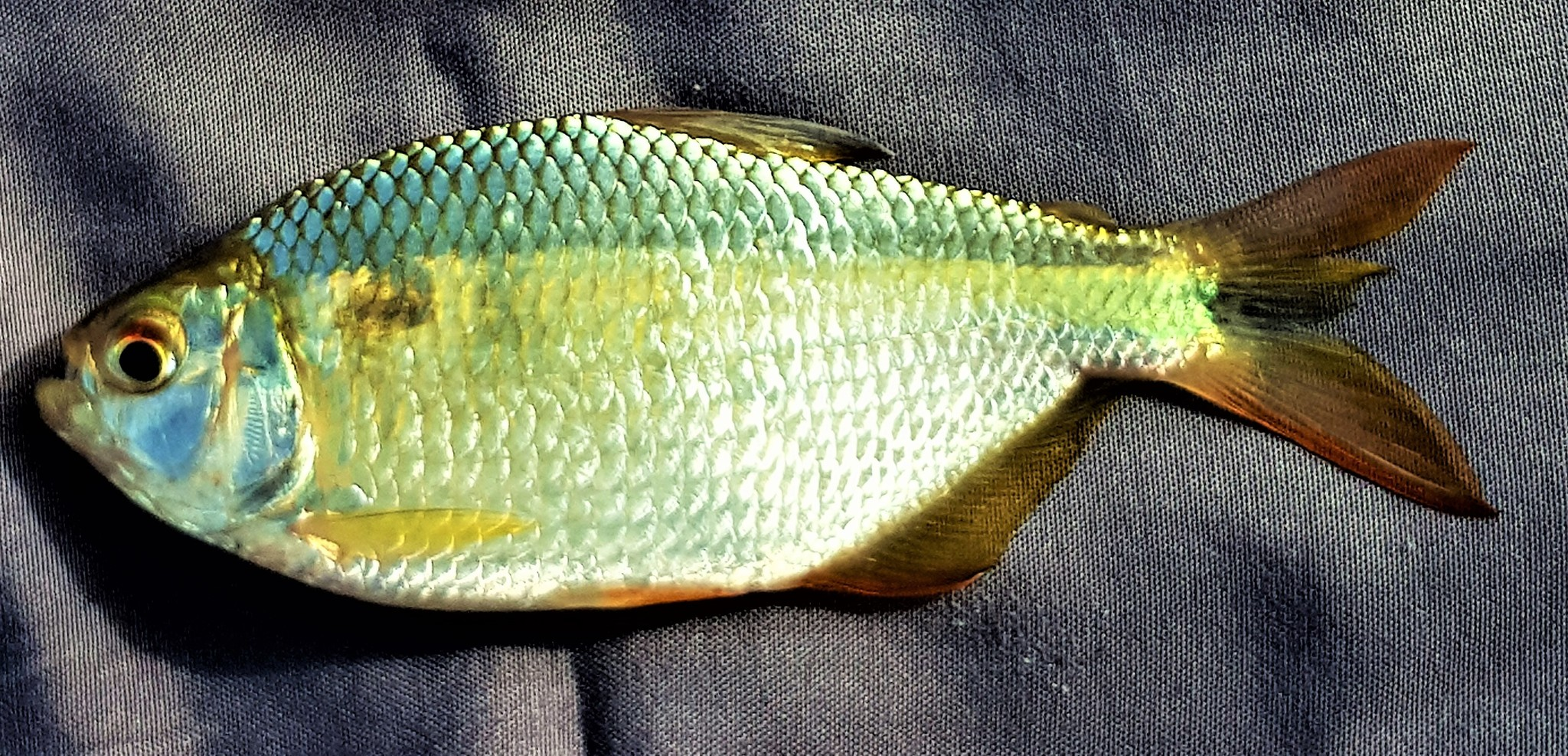
A. bimaculatus

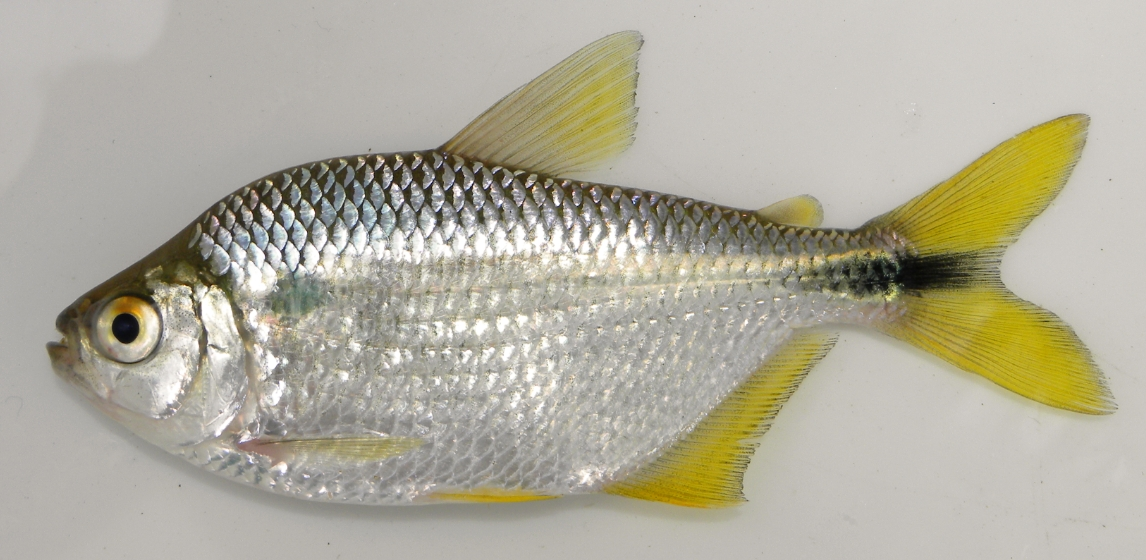
A. lacustris

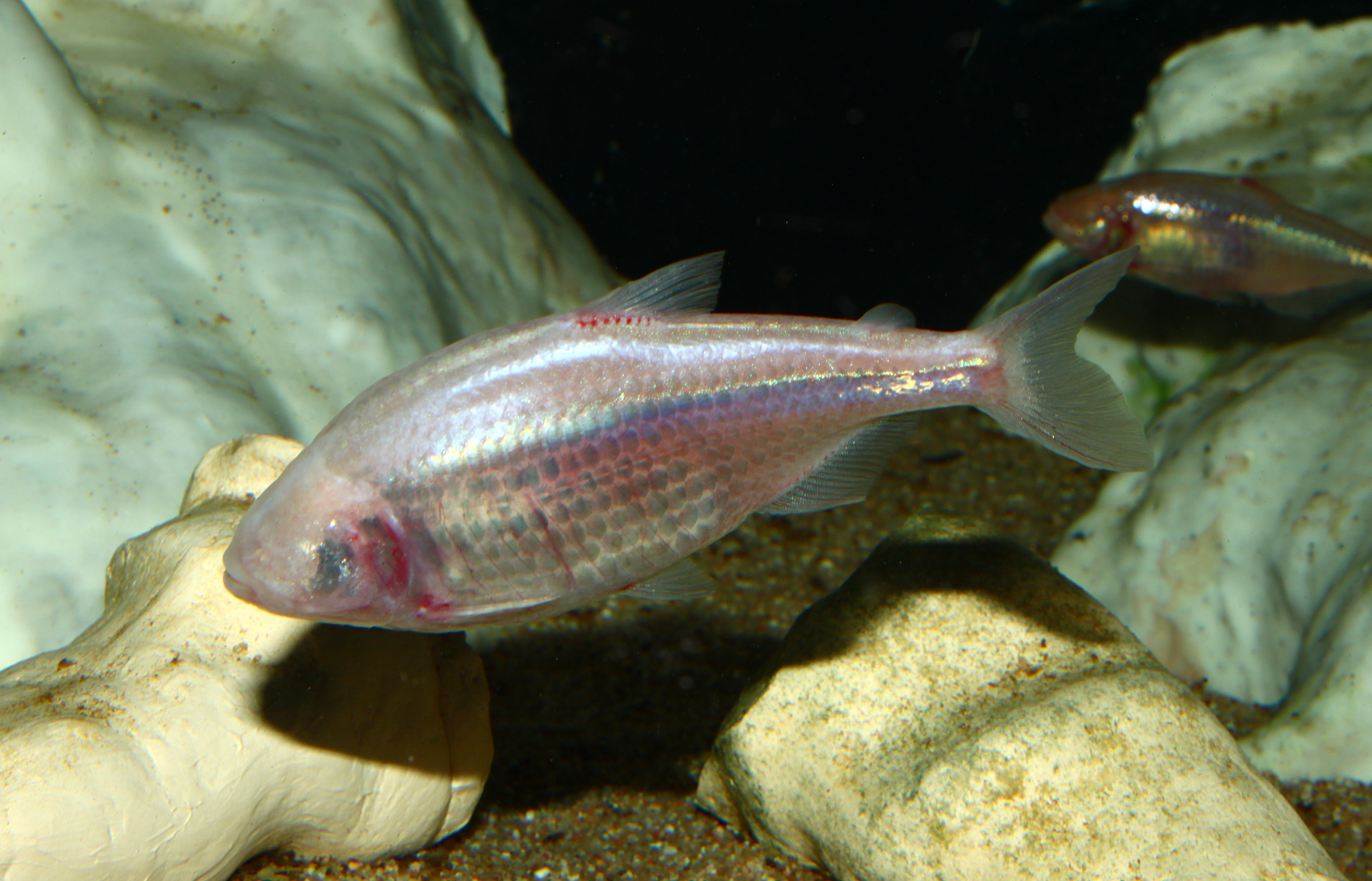
A. mexicanus (blind cave form)

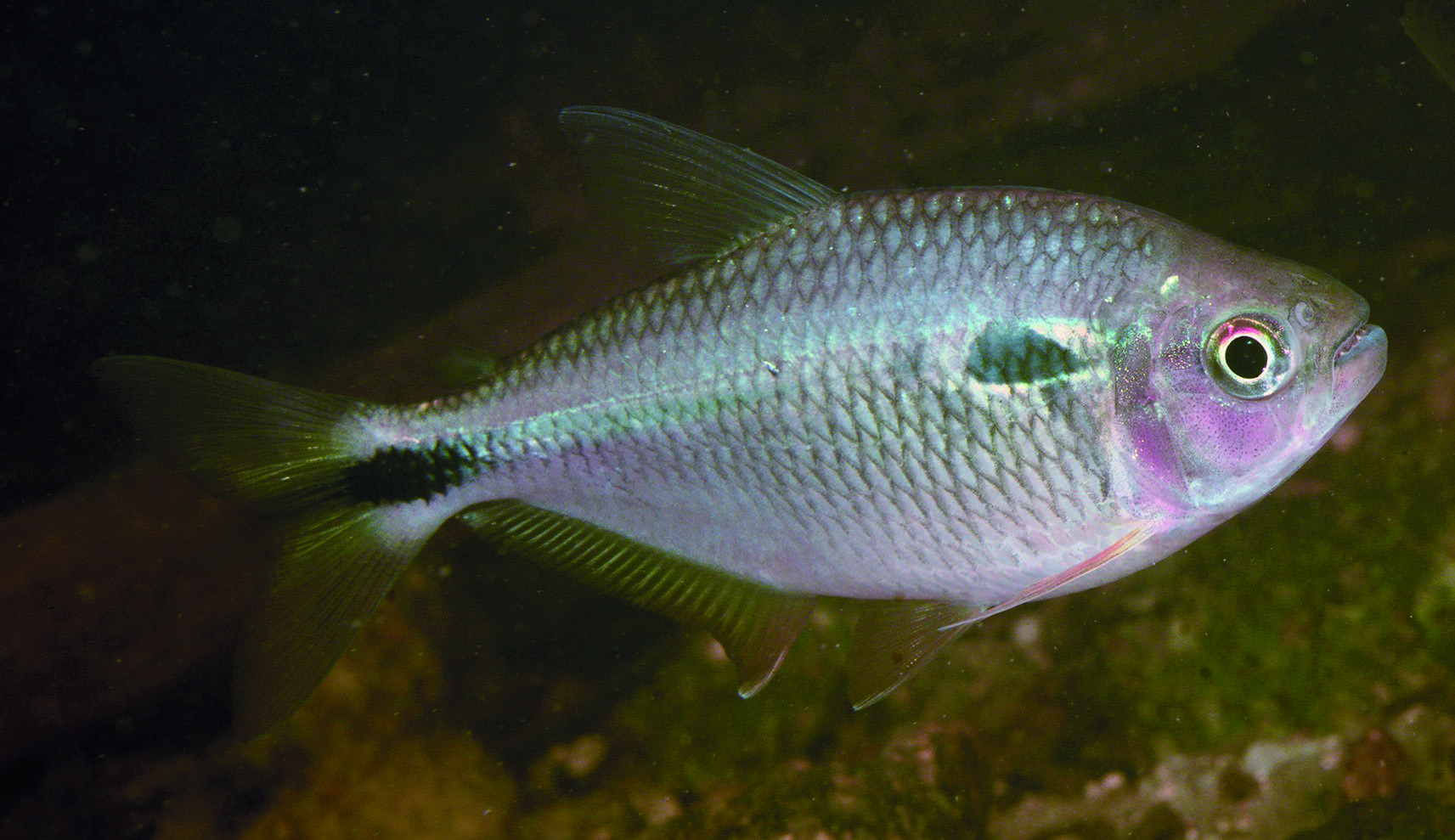
A. validus

Astyanax contains the following valid species:

- Astyanax abramis (Jenyns, 1842)
- Astyanax acatlanensis Schmitter-Soto, 2017
- Astyanax aeneus (Günther, 1860) (Banded tetra)
- Astyanax altior Hubbs, 1936 (Yucatán tetra)
- Astyanax anai Angulo, Santos, M. López, Langeani & McMahan, 2018
- Astyanax angustifrons (Regan, 1908)
- Astyanax apiaka Ferreira, F. C. T. Lima, Ribeiro, Flausino Junior, Machado & Mirande, 2023
- Astyanax aramburui Protogino, Miquelarena & H. L. López, 2006
- Astyanax argentatus Baird & Girard, 1854 (Texan tetra)
- Astyanax argyrimarginatus Garutti, 1999
- Astyanax bacalarensis Schmitter-Soto, 2017
- Astyanax bagual Bertaco & Vigo, 2015
- Astyanax bahiensis (Steindachner, 1877)
- Astyanax baileyi (Rosen, 1972)
- Astyanax belizianus (Bocourt, 1868) (Belizean tetra)
- Astyanax bimaculatus (Linnaeus, 1758) (Two-spot tetra)
- Astyanax boliviensis Ruiz-C., Román-Valencia, Taphorn, Buckup & Ortega, 2018
- Astyanax bourgeti C. H. Eigenmann 1908
- Astyanax bransfordii (Gill, 1877)
- Astyanax brevimanus (Günther, 1864). (Quiché tetra)
- Astyanax brevirhinus C. H. Eigenmann, 1908
- Astyanax brevoortii (Gill, 1858)
- Astyanax brucutu Zanata, F. C. T. Lima, Di Dario & Gerhard, 2017
- Astyanax caballeroi (Contreras-Balderas & Rivera-Tiellery, 1985)
- Astyanax caroni Ruiz-C, Román-Valencia & Taphorn, 2023
- Astyanax caucanus (Steindachner, 1879)
- Astyanax chaparae Fowler, 1943
- Astyanax clavitaeniatus Garutti, 2003
- Astyanax cocibolca Bussing, 2008
- Astyanax cordovae (Günther, 1880)
- Astyanax courensis Bertaco, Carvalho & Jerep, 2010
- Astyanax cubilhuitz Schmitter-Soto, 2017
- Astyanax cuyuni Ruiz-C, Román-Valencia & Taphorn, 2023
- Astyanax daguae C. H. Eigenmann, 1913
- Astyanax depressirostris Miranda-Ribeiro, 1908
- Astyanax dolinae da Graça, C. A. M. Oliveira, F. C. T. Lima, Pains da Silva & Fernandes, 2017
- Astyanax dorioni (Rosen, 1970)
- Astyanax douradilho Bertaco, 2014
- Astyanax elachylepis Bertaco & Lucinda, 2005
- Astyanax embera Ruiz-C., Román-Valencia, Taphorn, Buckup & Ortega, 2018
- Astyanax epiagos Zanata & Camelier, 2008
- Astyanax eremus Ingenito & Duboc, 2014
- Astyanax fasslii (Steindachner, 1915)
- Astyanax filiferus (C. H. Eigenmann, 1913)
- Astyanax finitimus (Bocourt, 1868)
- Astyanax gandhiae Ruiz-C., Román-Valencia, Taphorn, Buckup & Ortega, 2018
- Astyanax garuttii Ruiz-C, Román-Valencia & Taphorn 2023
- Astyanax gisleni Dahl, 1943
- Astyanax goyacensis C. H. Eigenmann, 1908
- Astyanax gracilior C. H. Eigenmann, 1908
- Astyanax guaricana C. A. M. Oliveira, Abilhoa & Pavanelli, 2013
- Astyanax incaicus Tortonese, 1942
- Astyanax integer Myers, 1930
- Astyanax jacobinae Zanata & Camelier, 2008
- Astyanax jenynsii (Steindachner, 1877)
- Astyanax joaovitori Oliveira, Pavanelli & Bertaco, 2017
- Astyanax jordanensis Alcaraz, Pavanelli & Bertaco, 2009
- Astyanax jordani (Hubbs & Innes, 1936)
- Astyanax kennedyi Géry, 1964
- Astyanax keronolepis P. C. Silva, M. C. Malabarba & L. R. Malabarba, 2019
- Astyanax kompi Hildebrand, 1938
- Astyanax kullanderi W. J. E. M. Costa, 1995
- Astyanax lacustris (Lütken, 1875)
- Astyanax leoni Ruiz-C., Román-Valencia & Taphorn, 2023
- Astyanax leopoldi Géry, Planquette & Le Bail, 1988
- Astyanax lineatus (Perugia, 1891)
- Astyanax longior (Cope 1878)
- Astyanax lorien Zanata, Burger & Camelier, 2018
- Astyanax macal Schmitter-Soto, 2017
- Astyanax maculisquamis Garutti & Britski, 1997
- Astyanax maximus (Steindachner, 1876)
- Astyanax megaspilura Fowler, 1944
- Astyanax metae C. H. Eigenmann, 1914
- Astyanax mexicanus (De Filippi, 1853) (Mexican tetra)
- Astyanax microlepis C. H. Eigenmann, 1913
- Astyanax microschemos Bertaco & Lucena, 2006
- Astyanax multidens (Pearson, 1924)
- Astyanax myersi (Fernández-Yépez, 1950)
- Astyanax nasutus Meek, 1907
- Astyanax nicaraguensis C. H. Eigenmann & Ogle, 1907
- Astyanax nobre Dagosta & Marinho, 2022
- Astyanax novae C. H. Eigenmann, 1911
- Astyanax obscurus (Hensel, 1870)
- Astyanax ocotal Valdez-Moreno, Rodiles-Hernández & Schmitter-Soto, 2017
- Astyanax orbignyanus (Valenciennes, 1850)
- Astyanax orstedii (Lütken, 1875)
- Astyanax orthodus C. H. Eigenmann, 1907
- Astyanax panamensis (Günther, 1864) (Panamanian tetra)
- Astyanax pardensis Salgado, 2021
- Astyanax petenensis (Günther, 1864) (Petén tetra)
- Astyanax pirabitira Lucena, Bertaco & Berbigier, 2013
- Astyanax pirapuan Tagliacollo, Britzke, G. S. C. Silva & Benine, 2011
- Astyanax pirauba (Zanata, Birindelli & Moreira, 2010)
- Astyanax poetzschkei Ahl, 1932
- Astyanax procerus Lucena, J. B. Castro & Bertaco, 2013
- Astyanax rioverde Lozano-Vilano & Schmitter-Soto, 2017
- Astyanax rupestris Zanata, Burger & Camelier, 2018
- Astyanax rupununi Fowler, 1914
- Astyanax saltor Travassos, 1960
- Astyanax salvatoris Valdez-Moreno, Lozano-Vilano & Schmitter-Soto, 2017
- Astyanax scintillans Myers, 1928
- Astyanax siapae Garutti, 2003
- Astyanax sincora Burger, Carvalho & Zanata, 2019
- Astyanax stilbe (Cope, 1870)
- Astyanax superbus Myers, 1942
- Astyanax symmetricus C. H. Eigenmann, 1908
- Astyanax tamiahua Schmitter-Soto, 2017
- Astyanax tarpon (C. H. Eigenmann, 1912)
- Astyanax taurorum Lucena, Zaluski & Lucena, 2017
- Astyanax tehuacanensis Schmitter-Soto 2017
- Astyanax totae Ferreira Haluch & Abilhoa, 2005
- Astyanax trierythropterus Manuel Perreira de Godoy, 1970
- Astyanax turmalinensis Triques, Vono & Caiafa, 2003
- Astyanax unitaeniatus Garutti, 1998
- Astyanax utiariti Bertaco & Garutti, 2007
- Astyanax validus Géry, Planquette & Le Bail, 1991
- Astyanax varii Zanata, Burger, Vita & Camelier, 2019
- Astyanax venezuelae Schultz, 1944
- Astyanax villwocki Zarske & Géry, 1999
- Astyanax viridis Salgado, 2021
- Astyanax yariguies (Torres-Mejia, Hernández & Senechal, 2012)
