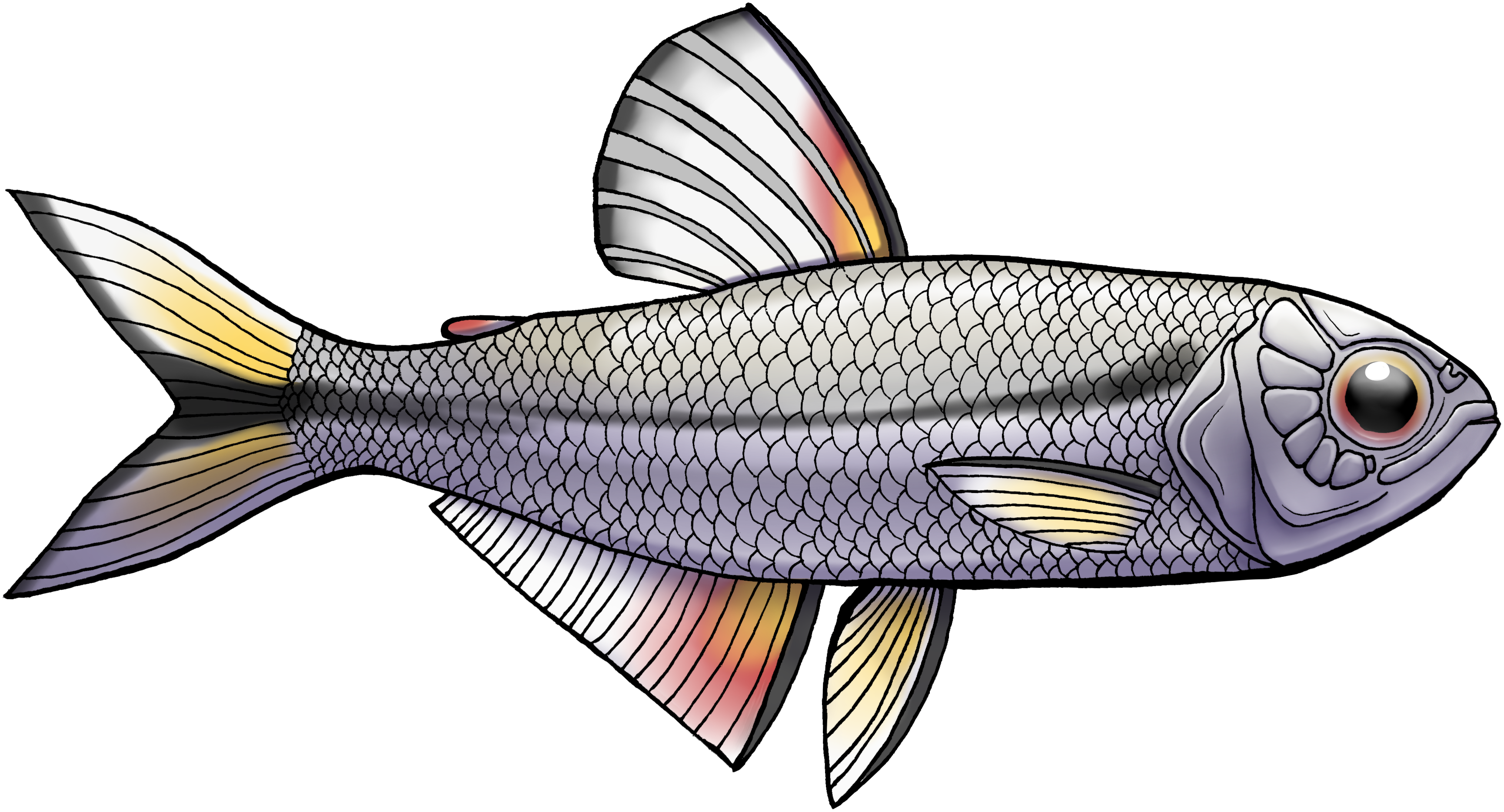
- Illustration

Conservation status
- Data Deficient (IUCN 3.1)

Scientific classification
- Kingdom: Animalia
- Phylum: Chordata
- Class: Actinopterygii
- Order: Characiformes
- Family: Acestrorhamphidae
- Genus: Astyanax
- Species: A. chaparae

Binomial name
- Astyanax chaparae Fowler, 1943

= Astyanax chaparae =

Species of fish

Astyanax chaparae, sometimes called the Chapare tetra, is a species of freshwater ray-finned fish belonging to the family Acestrorhamphidae, the American characins. This fish is endemic to Bolivia. It is endemic to its type locality, the Río Chapare, which is a tributary of the Mamoré located in the Cochabamba department. Little else is known of its diet, behavior, and ecology. Its conservation status is similarly unclear, as the IUCN ranks it a data deficient species.

Where other members of the genus Astyanax may sport maxillary teeth, A. chaparae lacks them, which can be used to tell it apart from other members of the genus; for instance, A. chaparae has been noted to resemble congener Astyanax multidens, which was remarked upon in its original description. Further research on its appearance, and its relationships to other members of the genus, is sparse.

== Taxonomy ==
Astyanax chaparae was first described by American zoologist Henry Weed Fowler in 1943, as one of various nomenclatural acts performed based upon a zoological expedition to Bolivia. (Former congener Knodus mizquae, basionym Astyanax mizquae, was also described from this expedition.) A. chaparae has retained its original name, and has no known synonyms.

The holotype is currently held by the Academy of Natural Sciences at Drexel University, under catalog number ANSP 69194.

=== Etymology ===
The genus name "Astyanax" is an allusion to the Iliad, wherein Astyanax was a Trojan warrior. This is thought to lie in the large, shield-like scales of type species Astyanax argentatus, but the reasoning was not made clear in the original text. The species name "chaparae" lies in the type locality of the species - the Río Chapare in the Cochabamba department of Bolivia.

Astyanax chaparae lacks a common name that is widely accepted, but the name "Chapare tetra" has been suggested based on the type locality.

== Description ==
Astyanax chaparae reaches roughly 3.4 cm (1.3 in) SL (standard length, without the tail fin included). The body is moderately deep, and the eye is wider in diameter than the snout is long. The lateral line has 34 scales. There are 5 rays in the dorsal fin, 23 rays in the anal fin, 14 rays in the pectoral fin, and 6 rays in the ventral fin. A. chaparae lacks maxillary teeth, which can be used to tell it apart from similar congeners (such as A. dolinae and A. multidens). Sexual dimorphism is unknown.

In terms of coloration, A. chaparae is known to resemble A. multidens in life. It has a base silvery body, a bright-silver lateral stripe with a dark stripe above, and fins in some variation of reddish or yellowish. In alcohol, its scales turn a pale fawn color with a lighter belly, while the lateral stripe retains its silver color.

== Distribution and ecology ==
Astyanax chaparae was originally collected from the Río Chapare in Bolivia, which is a tributary of the Mamoré River; it is endemic to the region. It is known to occur at elevations between 200 and 220 m, and inhabits white-water locales with depths influenced by local rainfall. Otherwise, little else is known of its ecology, such as biotope preferences, sympatric species, or diet.

The Rio Chapare, from whence A. chaparae was described, is a relatively narrow river (in comparison to others from the same region) with a meandering pattern. While it used to be responsible for a good deal of sediment deposition in the Mamoré, of which it is a tributary, changes in river dynamics have instead shifted its sediment load into other rivers, largely the Isiboro.

== Conservation status ==
Astyanax chaparae is listed as data deficient by the IUCN. Because it is known only from the Rio Chapare, no data exists for population trends, threats, or potential conservation buffers.

The Rio Chapare, which is the type locality of A. chaparae, is occupied by an indigenous group - the Yuracare people - that use the riparian forest's resources in such a way to act as conservators rather than consumers, which offers something of a buffer for aquatic species like A. chaparae.
