= Astyanax anai =

Conservation status
- Endangered (IUCN 3.1)

Scientific classification
- Kingdom: Animalia
- Phylum: Chordata
- Class: Actinopterygii
- Division: Teleostei
- Order: Characiformes
- Family: Acestrorhamphidae
- Genus: Astyanax
- Species: A. anai

Binomial name
- Astyanax anai Angulo, Santos, M. López, Langeani & McMahan, 2018

Species of fish

Astyanax anai is a species of freshwater ray-finned fish belonging to the family Acestrorhamphidae, the American characins. This fish is found in Central America. It has a restricted range, inhabiting a handful of Atlantic drainages in Costa Rica and Panama, and is known from locales only up to 100 meters elevation. As an endangered species, A. anai is a point of interest for conservation biologists studying the region. It can be found living sympatrically with other species of Astyanax, but is less common than its relatives.

Specimens of A. anai were frequently mistaken for specimens of Astyanax orthodus before it was recognized as its own species; physically and genetically, the two are very similar. A. anai sports several features not uncommon in the genus, such as silver scales, a humeral spot, and fins in a mixture of yellows and oranges. It also has a distinctive, elongated blotch of pigment on the caudal peduncle that often stretches forwards far enough to reach over the back end of the anal fin.

== Taxonomy ==
The original description of Astyanax anai was published in 2018, alongside a key to congeners found in the same general Central American region. A complicating factor is the close morphological and genetic resemblance of A. anai to congener Astyanax orthodus; before its nomination as a species, specimens of A. anai were often catalogued as specimens of A. orthodus. Researchers believe that A. anais may have been misidentified as A. orthodus as early as 1907.

Astyanax anai and A. orthodus form a clade. The next closest relative is Astyanax bimaculatus, followed by a more distant relationship to other Central and North American species of Astyanax.

Astyanax anai has no known synonyms, and has retained its original name.

=== Etymology ===
The genus name Astyanax originates in the Iliad, a Greek epic poem wherein Astyanax was a prince and a warrior. While not made clear in the nominal text, this allusion is likely because the large, silvery scales of type species A. argentatus could be compared to armor or a shield. The specific epithet anai serves as a reference to two entities of importance in local aquatic research: firstly, to the ecological organization Asociación ANAI, which the authors wished to recognize for its contributions to the conservation of the native range of A. anai; secondly, to the collection manager of the fishes collection of the Universidad de Costa Rica, Ana R. Ramírez Coghi.

== Description ==
Astyanax anai reaches a maximum length of 11.3 cm (4.4 in) SL (standard length, without the tail fin included). The body is deep and robust, with its deepest point just before the origin of the dorsal fin. The scales are cycloid and somewhat large, and there is a lateral line that has between 35 and 39 scales, most often 36 or 38. There are usually 12 rays in the pectoral fin, rarely 11, and there are consistently 7 rays in the ventral fin. The dorsal fin is also consistent, with 9 rays. The anal-fin rays vary more, ranging from 25 to 30, but 27 rays is the most common. (The first ray of the anal fin may be difficult to pick out, as it is quite small.) The two lobes of the caudal fin are usually the same size, though the lower is occasionally larger; there are usually 17 caudal-fin rays in total, but there may be 16 or 18.

In life, there are brown or greenish-brown scales on the back and silver or silver-white scales on the belly. There is an indistinct silver-blue or silver-green stripe down each side. The area surrounding the eye and on the operculum - the gill cover - has scattered black chromatophores (pigment cells). The eye itself sports a dark blotch or stripe in the middle of its back half, which often extends out onto the cheek and onto the upper portion of the operculum. The dorsal, caudal, and adipose fins are yellow to yellow-brown. The pectoral and ventral fins are largely transparent at the base, fading into yellow or orange at the margins. The anal fin has some strong yellow or orange pigmentation at the base, is transparent in the center, and regains the yellow or orange color distally. All fins except the adipose have scattered dark chromatophores.

As with most Astyanax, A. anai has a humeral spot; it is normally inconspicuous, is gray or black, and is rounded or horizontally ovate. There is a spot of pigment on the caudal peduncle in a darker black, rhomboid or rectangular in shape, that is long enough to stretch from the back of the anal fin to the margins of the central caudal-fin rays. This caudal-fin spot can be used as a delineating characteristic when comparing A. anai to A. orthodus, as A. orthodus has a caudal-peduncle spot that stops short of the anal-fin origin.

When preserved in alcohol, the body turns a pale yellow-brown, though the brown color of the back remains intact. The humeral spot becomes more conspicuous and turns a darker black. Two diffuse brown markings, either bars or vertically elongate spots, also become evident in the humeral area; the first intersects with the humeral spot, and the second is 2 to 4 scales behind the first. The silvery midline of the body develops a very thin line of chromatophores tracing from the humeral spot to the caudal-fin base. All fins turn a pale yellow or yellow-brown. The midline stripe also develops 10 to 14 chevron-shaped marks, pointed towards the head, separated from each other by 2 to 3 scales; these markings are apparent in life on juvenile specimens, but only become distinct on adults when preserved.

One of a few other members of Astyanax to sport similar chevron markings is another relative of A. orthodus, Astyanax boliviensis; however, these shapes are much more apparent in life on A. boliviensis, and have distal extensions that connect each mark to the next, which A. anai lacks.

=== Sexual dimorphism ===
Mature males of A. anai develop backwards-facing bony hooks on the rays of the anal and ventral fins. Researchers have specifically noted a similarity to congener A. lacustris, but such hooks are not uncommon in other species of Astyanax. Mature females and juveniles of both sexes lack these hooks.

== Distribution and ecology ==
Astyanax anai has a relatively restricted range, present only in a few coastal drainages in Panama and Costa Rica that are a part of the Sixaola river basin. It is a lowland species, collected from waters at 0 to 100 meters in elevation; the holotype of A. anai - the original specimen upon which the description was based - was collected at 60 m. In terms of a more specific biotope, it has a noted preference for pools and backwaters, where it takes shelter in caves under the riverbank or in plant roots. However, it is adaptable to various conditions and can withstand various current speeds, as well as temperatures ranging from 21 °C (70 °F) to 32 °C (90 °F). It will sometimes share its environment with congener Astyanax nicaraguensis, but is less common in flowing waters; in still areas, it may be more abundant.

Astyanax anai is omnivorous. It mainly eats seeds, but a substantial part of its diet is made up of insects, both terrestrial and aquatic.

== Conservation status ==
Astyanax anai is considered an endangered species due to a restricted range, a small extent of occurrence, and continued population decreases attributable largely to pesticide pollution. These pesticides are applied to local plantain and banana plantations, and may combine with a number of other factors to cause mass fish die-offs; for instance, "layers" of pesticides applied during an extended dry period may then get washed into the local watershed all at once during a period of heavy rainfall. However, this correlation has not been confirmed to be causal, and synergistic effects between pesticide use and other stressors, such as weather or food availability, are understudied.

The Sixaola river basin is already the subject on ongoing conservation research. Members of the local human population are invested in the region's wellbeing, considering that many livelihoods depend upon it. The International Union for the Conservation of Nature (IUCN) has hosted educational workshops focused upon the basic ecology of the region and actions that locals can take to conserve it. Factors such as these may provide an ecological buffer for the native aquatic species, including A. anai.

Due to its status as a relatively rare species, A. anai is a point of interest for conservationists researching the biodiversity of the region.
