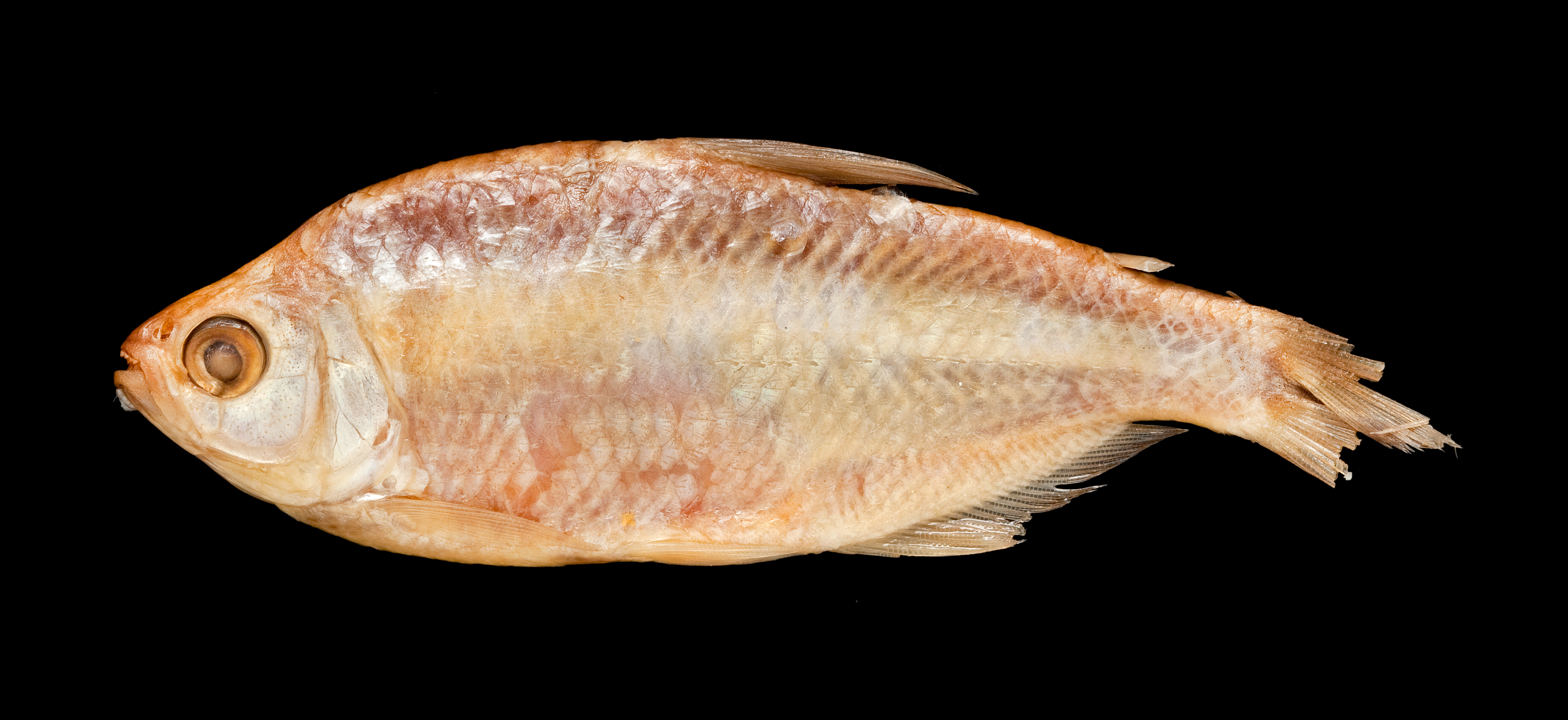
- A preserved specimen from the London Museum of Natural History

Scientific classification
- Kingdom: Animalia
- Phylum: Chordata
- Class: Actinopterygii
- Order: Characiformes
- Family: Acestrorhamphidae
- Genus: Astyanax
- Species: A. belizianus

Binomial name
- Astyanax belizianus (Bocourt, 1868)

Synonyms
- Tetragonopterus belizianus Bocourt, 1868

= Astyanax belizianus =

Species of fish

Astyanax belizianus, the Belizean tetra, is a species of freshwater ray-finned fish belonging to the family Acestrorhamphidae, the American characins. This fish is found in Central America. Little is known of its diet or specific environmental preferences, but it was first recorded in Belize. Modern ichthyology has expanded its range into Guatemala and Honduras, where it inhabits various rivers and lake tributaries. It is a silvery fish that may have a slight yellowish tint to its scales. The body is deep, especially in comparison to similar species from the same genus.

Its original description nominated it as a member of genus Tetragonopterus, which is not uncommon for members of Astyanax named in the late 1800s. A. belizianus was considered synonymous with congener Astyanax aeneus for a great deal of its existence, but recent research into the phylogeny of the genus (2017) has resurrected it from synonymy and re-granted it species status.

== Taxonomy ==
When originally described by French ichthyologist Marie Firmin Bocourt in 1868, A. belizianus was named Tetragonopterus belizianus. By 1899, German-American ichthyologist Carl H. Eigenmann had synonymized it under congener Astyanax aeneus; at the time, A. aeneus was considered a subspecies of Astyanax fasciatus, a species that has since been renamed Psalidodon fasciatus.

For a period in 1908, Astyanax aeneus was moved to genus Tetragonopterus as T. aeneus, and A. belizianus (Listed as T. belizianus) was still considered a synonym. In 1997, A. belizianus had not been recognized, but A. aeneus had been moved back into Astyanax; Mexican ichthyologist Juan J. Schmitter-Soto performed a thorough examination of the genus in 2017 and revived the specific epithet belizianus, placing it in the genus Astyanax for the first time, which is where the species currently stands.

The original description was sparse, but noted upon a similarity to congener Astyanax panamensis, also a member of Tetragonopterus at the time.

=== Etymology ===
The genus Astyanax has a name which is an allusion to the Iliad, in which a Trojan warrior named Astyanax appeared. The reason for this allusion was not made clear by Spencer Fullerton Baird and Charles Frédéric Girard when they named the genus, but it may originate in the scales of type species, Astyanax argentatus, which are large and silver, like armor or a shield. The specific name, belizianus, means "belonging to Belize", in reference to the type locality.

Due to its scientific name and type locality, A. belizianus is sometimes referred to as the Belizean tetra.

== Description ==
Astyanax belizianus is roughly 9.7 cm (3.8 in) total length, TL (with the tail fin included, as opposed to standard length, SL, without the tail fin). Some larger specimens can reach 10.9 cm (4.3 in) SL. The body is deep, which reportedly becomes more noticeable upon comparison to congeners. There are 10 dorsal-fin rays (occasionally 9), 22–29 anal-fin rays (with a mean of 26), and 11–12 pectoral-fin rays. There are 32–39 lateral-line scales, most often 36.

Its back is a slate-gray, its sides are tinged yellow, and the underside is gray. There is a dark blotch of pigment on the caudal peduncle and caudal fin. There is a single humeral spot, which can be p-shaped or indistinct. There is a lateral stripe of bright, reflective scales in greenish or yellowish on both flanks. When preserved in alcohol, the scales turn uniformly brassy, with a broad stripe down the side that is slightly paler.

Astyanax belizianus is morphologically similar to various other species of Astyanax, such as A. aeneus and A. panamensis. Until 2021, at least one specimen of A. belizianus was mistakenly included in the type series for A. aeneus, and several syntypes of A. panamensis have since been determined to be A. belizianus instead.

=== Sexual dimorphism ===
Mature males display tiny protrusions, called nuptial tubercles, on the head and scales. These are always simple, which means that they are in one piece, as opposed to bifid, split down the middle. Otherwise, little is known of differentiating coloration or morphometric aspects between the sexes.

== Distribution and ecology ==
The specific type locality is unknown; Bocourt's 1868 description simply stated "Environs de Belize". Since then, the range of A. belizianus has been elaborated upon. Starting in the Mullins River of central Belize, it extends south to tributaries of Lake Izabal, in Guatemala and northern Honduras. Specific biotope preferences are unknown, as are diet and sympatry, though there is the possibility that records have been made while A. belizianus was grouped under A. aeneus.

== Conservation status ==
Astyanax belizianus has not been evaluated by the IUCN. Members of Astyanax as a whole are generally hardy and adaptive, but A. belizianus inhabits localities that face both natural and anthropogenic environmental pressures.

The Mullins River area is subject to hurricanes, which has a recorded impact on the geoscape, including surface sediments; this, in turn, can impact water quality. Lake Izabal generally resists sediment disturbance thanks to the nearby wetlands, but has been subject to human pollution in modern times, largely due to mining activity. One element to consider is that, due to the presence of both an inlet river and an outlet river, the water of the lake is totally replaced, or "cycled", every 6.6 months; it is unknown what impact this has on its tributaries, if any.
