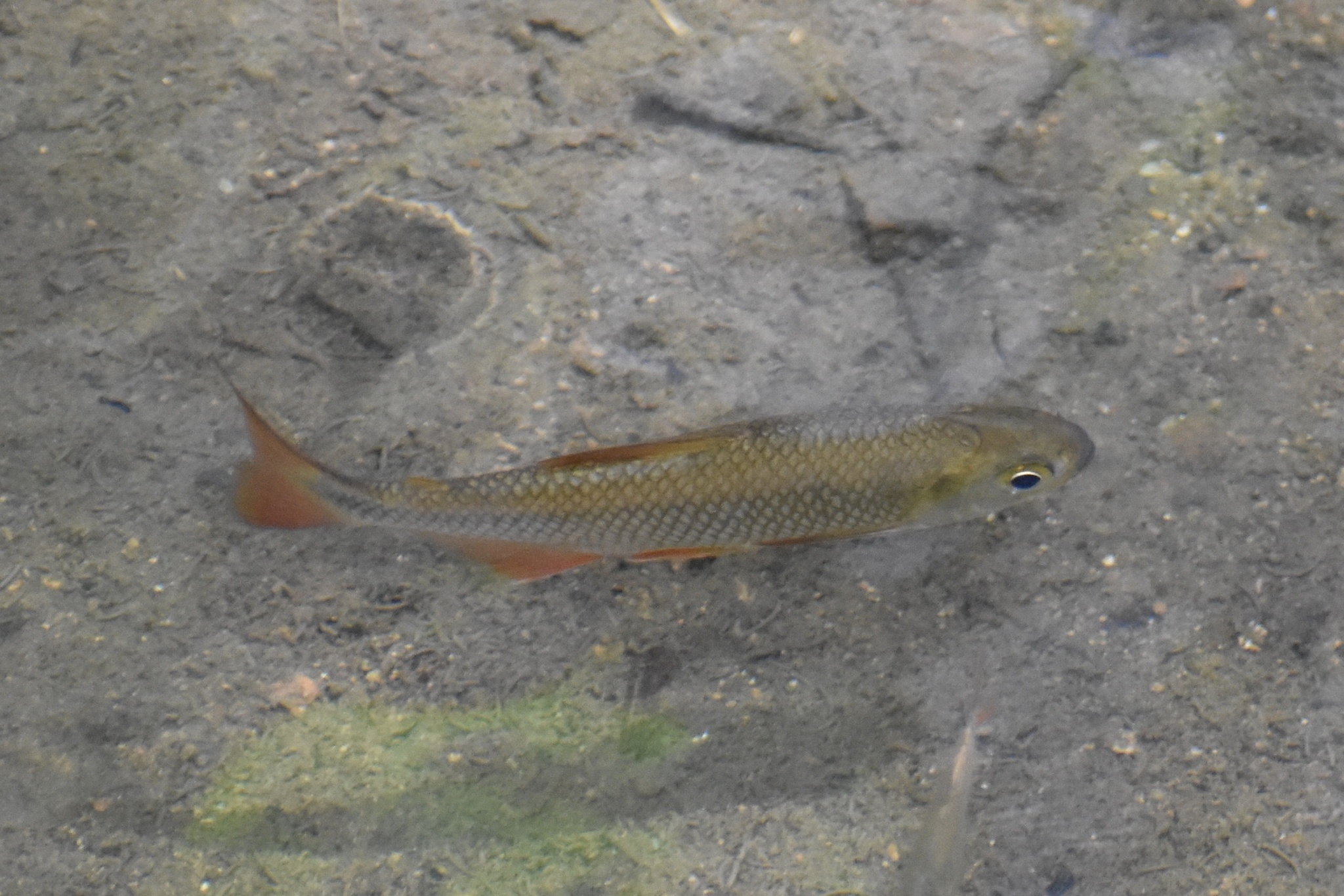

Conservation status
- Least Concern (IUCN 3.1)

Scientific classification
- Kingdom: Animalia
- Phylum: Chordata
- Class: Actinopterygii
- Order: Characiformes
- Family: Acestrorhamphidae
- Genus: Astyanax
- Species: A. panamensis

Binomial name
- Astyanax panamensis (Günther, 1864)

Synonyms
- Astyanax ruberrimus (C. H. Eigenmann, 1913); Tetragonopterus panamensis (Günther, 1864)

= Astyanax panamensis =

Species of fish

Astyanax panamensis, known as the Panamanian tetra, is a species of freshwater fish belonging to the family Acestrorhamphidae, the American characins, of the order Characiformes. The species' range extends from the Atlantic and Pacific slopes of Panama southward to Istmina, Colombia. It was first described by Albert Günther in 1864. The species lacks any dark stripes along its body, has a pointed snout, and has a spot located right before its caudal fin. Specimens can reach a maximum length of 10.1 centimetres (4.0 in).

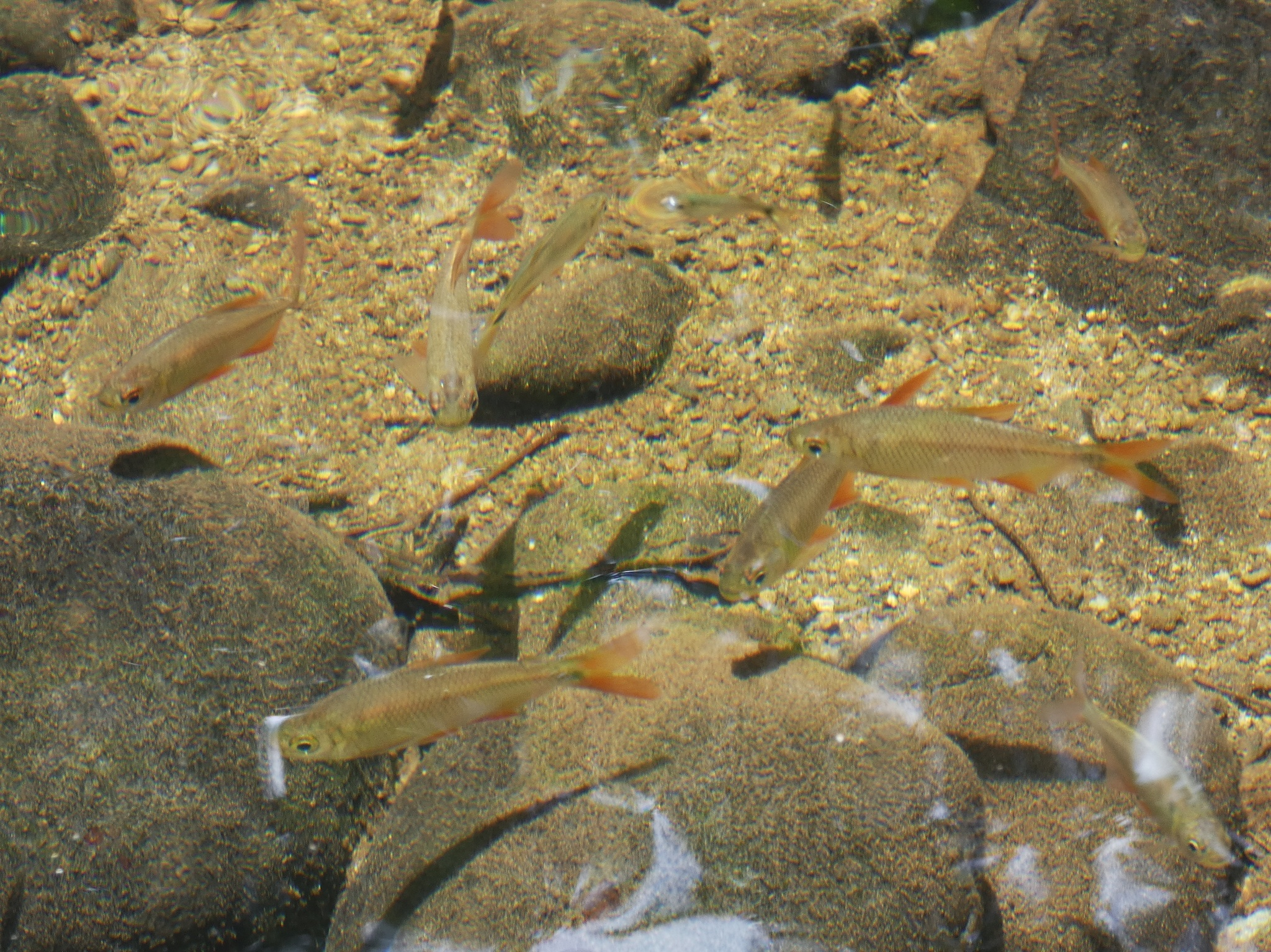
A school of wild specimens

The species generally prefers waters with slower currents. Although the species is abundant throughout its range, its regional population in the Trinidad arm of Lake Gatun had declined by 88% from 1972 to 2017, likely due to the introduction of the peacock bass as an apex predator.
