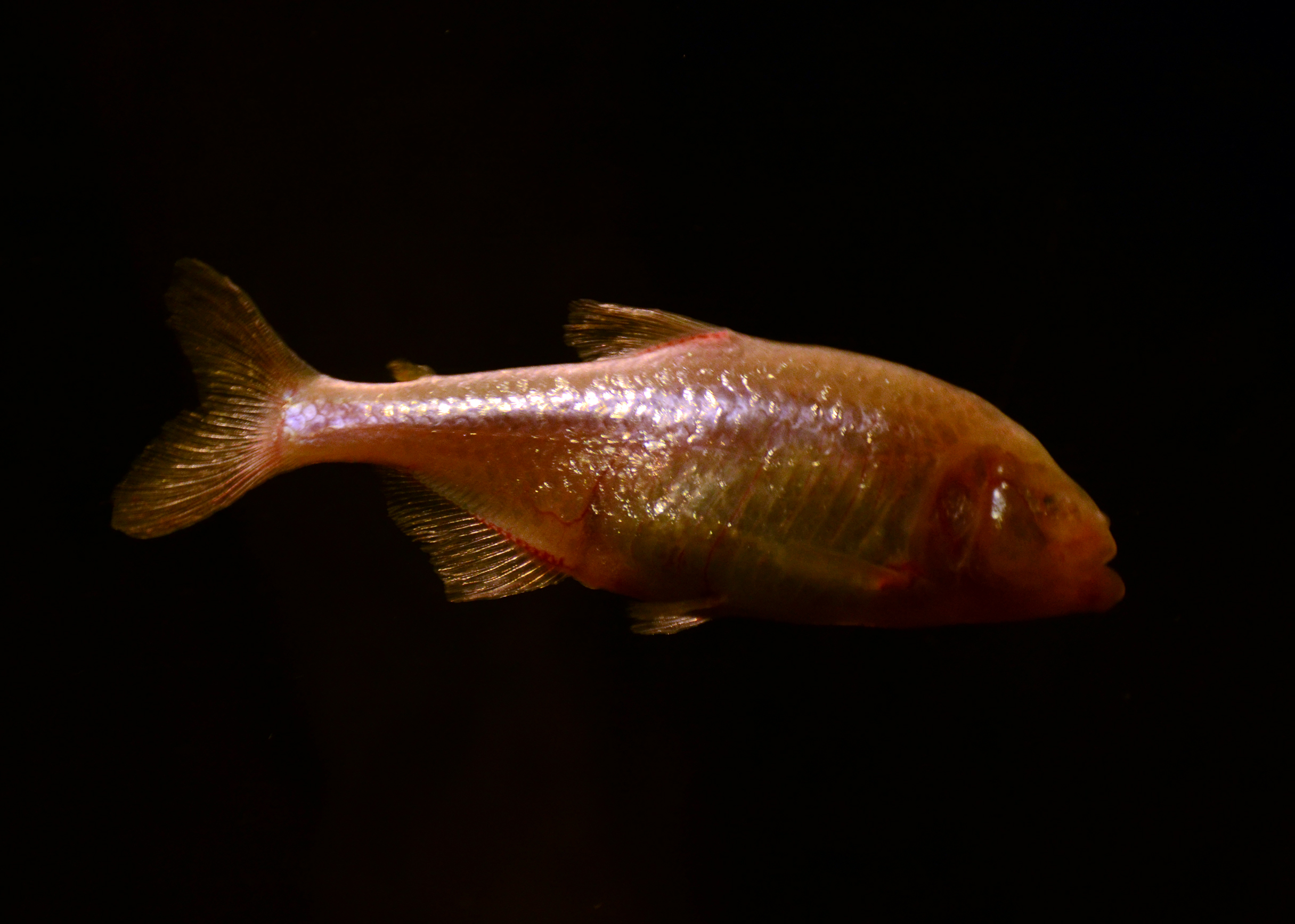

Conservation status
- Endangered (IUCN 3.1)

Scientific classification
- Kingdom: Animalia
- Phylum: Chordata
- Class: Actinopterygii
- Order: Characiformes
- Family: Acestrorhamphidae
- Genus: Astyanax
- Species: A. jordani

Binomial name
- Astyanax jordani (C. L. Hubbs & Innes, 1936)

Synonyms
- Anoptichthys jordani C. L. Hubbs & Innes, 1936; Anoptichthys antrobius Álvarez, 1946; Anoptichthys hubbsi Álvarez, 1947

= Astyanax jordani =

Blind cave tetra

Species of fish

Astyanax jordani is a species of freshwater ray-finned fish belonging to the family Acestrorhamphidae, the American characins. This fish is found in Mexico. It is known in the aquarium trade as the blind cave tetra, or by its local Spanish name sardina ciega.

A blind cave fish, A. jordani is very closely related to the Mexican tetra (A. mexicanus) and their taxonomy is disputed. Some treat the two as variants of a single species (in which case A. jordani is a junior synonym of A. mexicanus) and this is supported by phylogenetic evidence, but others continue to recognize the two as separate species.

A. jordani is listed on the IUCN Red List as Endangered on the basis of a dwindling population and an acutely-restricted, highly variable habitat. It is fairly resilient, however, having a population doubling time of 15 months.

The fish was named in honor of C. Basil Jordan of the Texas Aquaria Fish Company (Dallas, Texas), who donated the first type specimens and documented and observed the first wild blind characins known to science.

It reportedly has been introduced to the Philippines.
