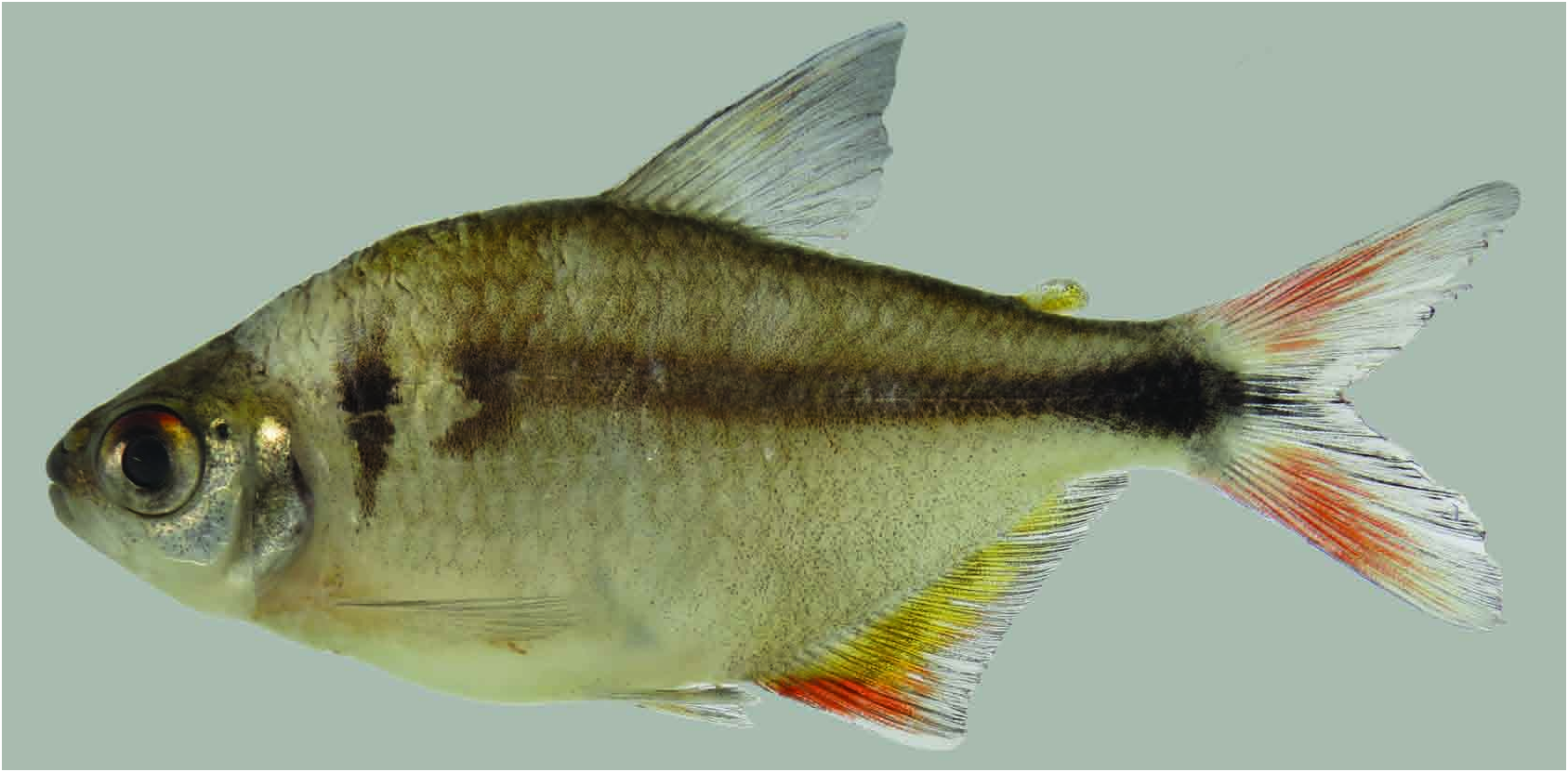

Scientific classification
- Kingdom: Animalia
- Phylum: Chordata
- Class: Actinopterygii
- Order: Characiformes
- Family: Acestrorhamphidae
- Genus: Astyanax
- Species: A. bagual

Binomial name
- Astyanax bagual Bertaco & Vigo, 2015

= Astyanax bagual =

Species of fish

Astyanax bagual is a species of freshwater ray-finned fish belonging to the family Acestrorhamphidae, the American characins. This fish is known only from the Taquari-Antas river basin in southern Brazil. It is unusual in the genus Astyanax because mature male specimens display bony hooks on the rays of all fins; in opposition, most others have them on the anal, pelvic, or pectoral fins - sometimes on more than one of these, but very rarely on all fins. It can further be told apart from various congeners by way of dentition and some aspects of coloration, including the presence of two humeral spots instead of one (which is more common).

Though it lives in a somewhat restricted area, A. bagual is thought to be more widespread than has been recorded. As well as this, it bears physiological similarities to several congeners known to be resilient and adaptable. As such, despite not being evaluated officially by the IUCN, A. bagual is generally considered a species of least concern. Other than this, little research has been done regarding its ecology, including diet and sympatric species.

== Taxonomy ==
Astyanax bagual was described in 2015 by Brazilian researchers Vinícius A. Bertaco and Anelise C. Vigo. The possibility of more than one unnamed Astyanax species native to the Taquari-Antas river basin, the type locality of A. bagual, was remarked upon in a study of the relevant ichthyofauna in 2013. Despite the cryptic nature of the genus Astyanax as a whole, A. bagual is not currently considered to be a part of any species complex; various congeners found within a similar range are mostly within the complex centering on Astyanax scabripinnis, such as A. obscurus, A. ojiara, and A. paris. However, based on analysis of various synapomorphies, A. bagual is likely to form a clade with A. chico and A. troya.

=== Etymology ===
The genus name "Astyanax" is an homage to the Greek figure Astyanax, a warrior and the son of Trojan prince Hector. This possibly originates in the armor-like scales of type species Astyanax argentatus, which are plate-like and silver, but the reasoning was not made clear in the original text. The specific name "bagual" is a Tupí-Guaraní word meaning "wild horse", specifically a sexually mature wild stallion with the associated aggressive temperament. This is an allusion to the presence of bony hooks on all fins of mature male A. bagual.

Astyanax bagual currently lacks a common name and has no known synonyms.

== Description ==
Astyanax bagual reaches 7.8 cm (3.1 in) standard length (SL), with a rather compressed body of moderate depth. It has 24-28 branched anal-fin rays, 11–13 pectoral-fin rays, and 7 pelvic-fin rays. The lobes of the caudal fin have either 10 or 11 rays each.There are 37–39 perforated lateral line scales, and 14 scale rows around the caudal peduncle (circumpeduncular scales). There are 2–4 tricuspid maxillary teeth, which can be used as a differentiating feature; similar congeners more often have just one.

Its body is largely silver with a slightly darker back and underside, as well as a touch of yellowish or brown on most scales. The dorsal, ventral, pectoral, and adipose fins are all yellow towards the front and red towards the back, and the caudal fin is largely red with a yellowish central portion. The anal fin is mostly yellow with a spot of bright red on the first few rays. A. bagual has two humeral spots, the foremost of which is vertically elongated and wider at the top than the bottom. The second humeral spot is large and sometimes inconspicuous, blending in with a dark lateral stripe, as well as positioned higher than the first (does not extend below the lateral line). The lateral stripe never touches the foremost of the two spots, but always starts at the second, and terminates in a conspicuous blotch of pigment on the caudal peduncle. This caudal peduncle spot continues onto the middle rays of the caudal fin.

=== Sexual dimorphism ===
All mature male specimens of A. bagual develop bony hooks on the first few rays of every fin. This is an unusual feature within the genus; most other species that display similar dimorphism have hooks restricted to the anal, pelvic, and/or pectoral fins.

== Distribution and ecology ==
Astyanax bagual is only known from the Taquari-Antas basin of the Rio Jacuí drainage, which is a part of the laguna dos Patos system in the Rio Grande do Sul state of southern Brazil. It is most often found in smaller rivers up to two meters deep with rocky substrate, and seems to prefer areas of moderate riparian vegetation. A. bagual has been collected at altitudes from 179 m to roughly 300 m above sea level.

Little is known of A. bagual's diet and interaction with sympatric life, but it is parasitized by Monogenean species Characithecium chascomusensis. The riparian zones in A. bagual's native range include Atlantic forests and natural grasslands; the environment therein faces some survival pressure due to human activity.

== Conservation status ==
Astyanax bagual has not been evaluated by the IUCN. It is not thought to be in any imminent danger of extinction, given its similarity to hardy congeners and the suspicion of a wider range than has currently been identified. Still, the Taquari-Antas basin faces anthropogenic pressures, largely in the form of river damming for hydroelectric power generation; in 2010, there were 26 active dams in the basin, and 80 other sites being surveyed for potential construction of new power plants. An example of dam placement changing an aquatic environment can be seen in the Xingu River, another Brazilian river with diverse ichthyofauna. Construction of the Belo Monte dam, the most prominent power station along its length, radically altered the river's flow.
