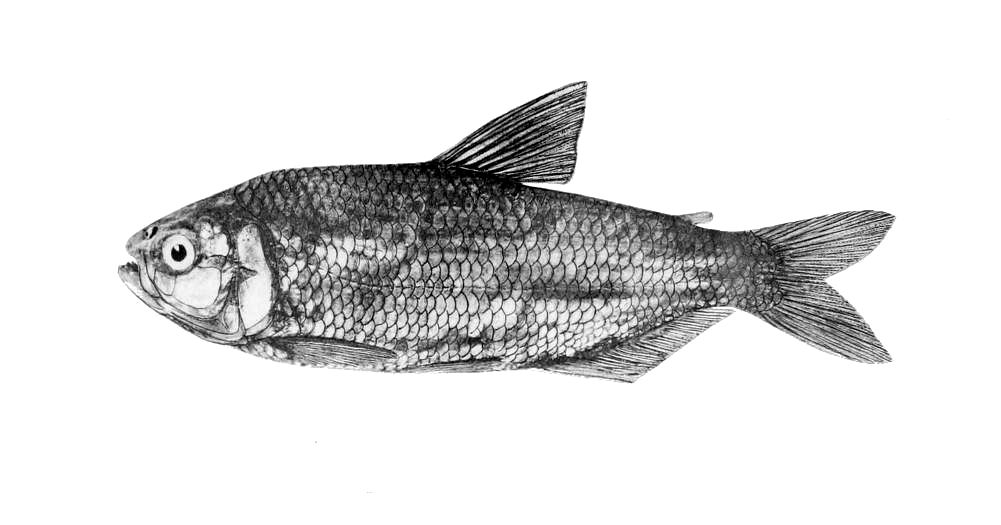
- 1917 illustration

Conservation status
- Vulnerable (IUCN 3.1)

Scientific classification
- Kingdom: Animalia
- Phylum: Chordata
- Class: Actinopterygii
- Division: Teleostei
- Order: Characiformes
- Family: Acestrorhamphidae
- Genus: Astyanax
- Species: A. cordovae

Binomial name
- Astyanax cordovae Günther, 1880

= Astyanax cordovae =

Species of fish

Astyanax cordovae is a species of freshwater ray-finned fish belonging to the family Acestrorhamphidae, the American characins. This fish is endemic to Argentina. Its range is restricted to the Primero and Segundo rivers at low elevations, and it is an infrequent sighting therein. This makes it unique, as the only fish species endemic to the region. Most of its time is spent near the riverbed. It is an omnivore with a preference for land-dwelling insects that get washed into the river from shore.

While A. cordovae has a limited collection of species-specific research, conservationists are certain that it is a threatened species. This is not only due to its limited range but also because that range is decreasing. A variety of factors are at play, such as exploitation of biological resources and the destruction of riparian zones. Further, there are no protections in place for it.

== Taxonomy ==
Astyanax cordovae was originally described as Tetragonopterus cordovae by prolific zoologist Albert Günther in 1880. It was placed into the genus Astyanax by ichthyologists Barton Warren Evermann and William Converse Kendall in 1906, and has retained that designation since. It received a minor redescription from German-American ichthyologist Carl H. Eigenmann in 1921, in which Eigenmann respecified the fin-ray and scale counts.

Specimens of congener Astyanax rutilus may have mistakenly been catalogued as A. cordovae in the past.

=== Etymology ===
The specific epithet cordovae originates in the Argentine province from which the species was described, Córdoba. The generic name Astyanax has origins in the Iliad, a Greek epic poem in which Astyanax was a great warrior, but the source text did not provide a reason for this choice of name; one possibility is the large silver scales of type species A. argentatus, and their resemblance to polished armor.

While it lacks a species-specific common name widely accepted by the scientific community, A. cordovae is one of multiple species referred to as a "mojarra" in Spanish. "Cordoba tetra" or "Cordoba astyanax" have been suggested based upon the type locality and range.

== Description ==
Astyanax cordovae is a fish commonly 3–5 in (7.6–12.7 cm) long, sometimes described as the largest of the genus. It has a body roughly 1–1.7 in (2.5–4.3 cm) deep. The caudal peduncle – the joint where the tail fin attaches – is 1/3rd as deep as the body. There are 43-45 scales in the lateral line, which is a high number for the genus but not uncommon; other congeners with 43 or more scales in the lateral line include A. microlepis, A. maximus, and A. multidens.

The general body color in life is silvery-gray with an unclear lateral stripe. There is a diffuse humeral spot that Günther noted was not always present in the original description; in the years since, having a humeral spot has become part of the identifying criteria. Upon preservation in alcohol, the body color becomes a reflective yellow and the lateral stripe becomes further diffuse. The humeral spot, while unclear, remains visible.

Astyanax cordovae demonstrates sexual dimorphism. Mature males have small bony hooks on the fin-rays of the anal and pelvic fins, which is a common feature of the genus.

== Distribution and habitat ==
Astyanax cordovae has a restricted range, native only to the Primero River and Segundo River of Argentina. It considered the only fish endemic to the region. It can most frequently be found in the elevation range from sea level up to 600 meters. It is generally benthopelagic, which means that it spends most of its time close to the riverbed.

The Primero River is a large river with a long history of flooding. The Segundo river runs through rocky terrain formed by volcanic activity, with a sediment load consisting of clays, silts, and fine sands. The Primero and Segundo rivers both flow into Mar Chiquita, the largest lake in Argentina. The riparian zone is largely woodland, with notable agricultural use.

== Diet and ecology ==
Astyanax cordovae is an omnivore with a strong preference for invertebrates of various kinds. In the Primero river specifically, A. cordovae subsists largely on a diet of algae and arthropods, with seasonal variation in the origins of its prey (aquatic vs flying vs terrestrial); terrestrial arthropods make up most of its diet in the spring, taken over by aquatic larvae in the summer.

Astyanax cordovae's range overlaps with several congeners, including A. eigenmannorum and A. asuncionensis. Its range also overlaps with Paslidodon hermosus, which was originally a member of Astyanax but was redesignated.

== Conservation status ==
When assessed by the IUCN in 2007, A. cordovae was designated a vulnerable species due to habitat loss and competition from introduced and invasive species. Water pollution from pesticides and from the city of Cordoba also plays a part in its decreasing habitat quality. An earlier report from 2001 placed emphasis on A. cordovae's restricted range, and considered it a vulnerable species of highest priority. A more recent report in 2021, published by the National University of Cordoba and released by the province's government, classified it as critically endangered.
