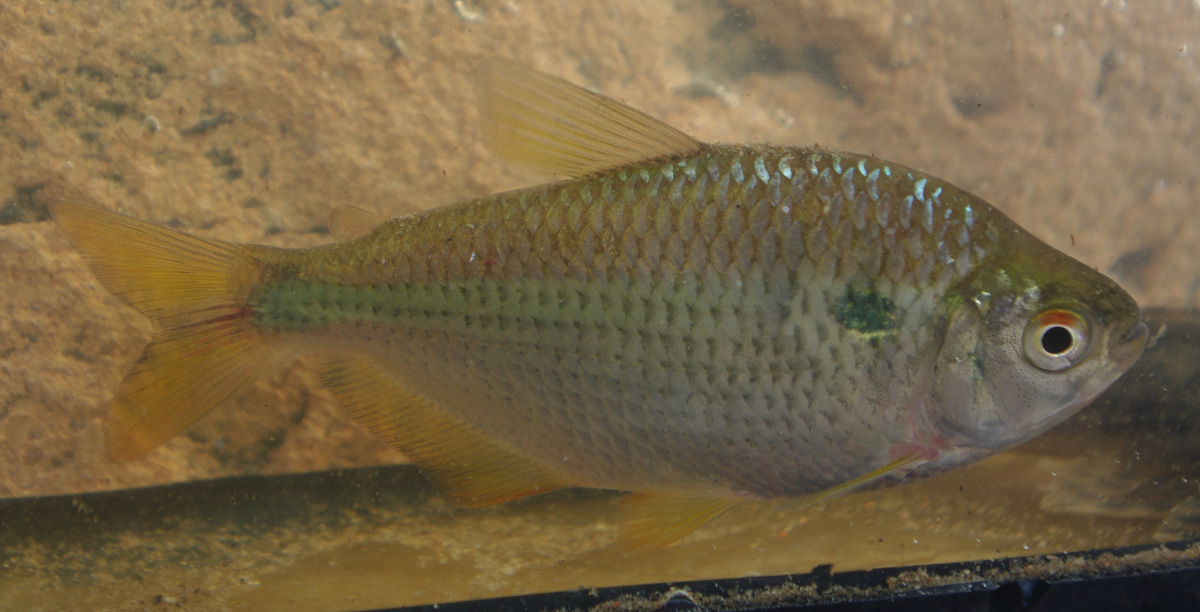

Conservation status
- Least Concern (IUCN 3.1)

Scientific classification
- Kingdom: Animalia
- Phylum: Chordata
- Class: Actinopterygii
- Order: Characiformes
- Family: Acestrorhamphidae
- Genus: Astyanax
- Species: A. abramis

Binomial name
- Astyanax abramis (Jenyns, 1842)

Synonyms
- Tetragonopterus abramis Jenyns, 1842; Bertoniolus paraguayensis Fowler, 1918; Astyanax paraguayensis (Fowler, 1918)

= Astyanax abramis =

Species of fish

Astyanax abramis is a species of freshwater ray-finned fish belonging to the family Acestrorhamphidae, the American characins. This fish is found in the inland rivers of South America. It is plentiful in almost the entire continent, with a habitat including the La Plata, upper Amazon, and Meta River basins. The body shape is subrhomboidal (somewhat rhomboidal) and laterally compressed, and the scales are largely silver, with a blue or green tint on the dorsal side.

As a cryptic species, A. abramis could possibly constitute multiple species that are currently undescribed. A. abramis is also a part of a species complex that includes itself and various congeners, including Astyanax bimaculatus, the namesake of the complex, and Astyanax lacustris, which is very closely related to A. abramis and looks very similar. Astyanax is a particularly speciose genus wherein cryptics and complexes are not uncommon.

== Description ==
Abramis astyanax is a small fish that has a maximum recorded length of 14 cm (5.5 in) in standard length (SL) and a maximum recorded weight of 29.7 g (1.05 oz). The body is compressed laterally and is subrhomboidal. It is a silvery fish with a green or blue tint on the back, and there is a dark spot, starting on the caudal peduncle, that reaches the posterior margin of the caudal fin. Its fins, while largely transparent, can also have a slight red, orange, or yellow tint.

There is a dark humeral spot on each side behind the top of the head ("humeral" means "around or related to the shoulder", as in "humerus"). This spot manifests as a horizontal oval, and the humeral region also sports two vertical brown bars. There is a black lateral stripe, just above the lateral line, that starts at the humeral spot or just behind it.

Morphometric characteristics include 1 dorsal-fin spine, 10 dorsal-fin rays, and 30 to 34 anal-fin rays. A. abramis also has 42 to 48 lateral-line scales; this can be used to differentiate it from closely related congener A. lacustris, which has 36 to 39. The scales are generally small, with concentric grooves near the posterior margin. A. abramis lacks maxillary teeth, which can be used to tell it apart from various other similar congeners; however, the premaxilla still sports teeth, and A. abramis is believed to demonstrate unilateral replacement of missing teeth.

=== Sexual dimorphism ===
While there are few morphometric differences between the sexes, male A. abramis can be distinguished from female by the presence of small hooks or barbs on the anal-fin rays of male specimens. Females also tend to be more common than males.

== Taxonomy ==
When first described, A. abramis was given the basionym Tetragonopterus abramis. English naturalist Leonard Jenyns prescribed this name in 1842, building from the work of well-known English natural historian Charles Darwin, who collected the type specimens in the 19th century. At one point, it was described as a separate species under the name Bertoniolus paraguayensis, but this name has been synonymized with A. abramis. In 2016, its classification as a species was confirmed as valid, and it received a redescription.

Within Astyanax, there are three subgenera - Astyanax stricto sensu, Poecilurichthys, and Zygogaster. A. abramis belongs to Poecilurichthys.

Multiple species in the genus Astyanax are considered cryptic - that is, two or more possible species that are currently considered synonymous because of remarkable similarity, but that cannot reproduce with each other. A. abramis is no exception to this and is considered a cryptic species. It is also a part of the Astyanax bimaculatus species complex, alongside Astyanax lacustris.

At the time of description, Jupiaba species J. abramoides was believed to be closely related to A. abramis. This is the origin of its specific epithet - "oides" means "having the shape of". The basionym of J. abramoides is, in fact, Astyanax abramoides.

=== Etymology and nomenclature ===
The specific name "abramis" is an allusion to European species Abramis brama, a leuciscid that has a similar body shape (described as "subrhomboidal"). The genus name "Astyanax" comes from a figure in Homer's Iliad, Astyanax, who was the son of Hector, a famed Trojan warrior. Why the genus has this name was not made clear in the original text, but could possibly refer to the large, armor-like scales of species A. argentatus.

In terms of a common name, A. abramis is one of various species of Astyanax referred to as "lambari".

== Distribution and habitat ==
Astyanax abramis can be found in the La Plata basin, as well as the upper Amazon and Meta River basins. It is most often found in lentic (still water) environments. Lentic environments, without the oxygenation provided by flowing water, are generally lower in dissolved oxygen, which has resulted in A. abramis developing adaptations to such conditions, including morphological plasticity (albeit limited).

The relevant habitat stretches through multiple countries, including Brazil, Argentina, Bolivia, Uruguay, and Paraguay. Specific rivers, regions, and tributaries include the Juramento, Yabotí, and Parana.

== Ecology and biology ==
In environments of strong hypoxia, A. abramis can develop reversible dermal extensions, possibly as a way to increase the efficacy of aquatic surface respiration (ASR). Previous research on similar traits had revealed a demonstrable link between morphological plasticity and ASR, and this is likely to remain the case in A. abramis. ASR is a trait in many species of fish that need to cope with hypoxic environments.

Astyanax abramis lives in syntopy with sister species A. lacustris. It is also known to live in sympatry with other congeners, including A. puka, A. asuncionensis, A. eigenmanniorum, and A. lineatus, specifically in the Juramento River. Because it is an unspecialized feeder that also eats other fish, sympatry with smaller species is unlikely.

Astyanax abramis is also subject to parasite infestation. The parasitic nematode worm Procamallanus (Spirocamallanus) hilarii has been recorded from a wide variety of neotropical fish species, including A. abramis.

=== Reproduction ===
Astyanax abramis has a split spawning season, with higher reproduction activity in April and October. These months correspond with periods of higher water temperature and greater rainfall. In female fish, the length of the body is positively correlated with the size of the ovaries, so a period of greater reproductive activity is likely to have more large female specimens.

=== Diet ===
Astyanax abramis is a highly-adaptable omnivore that lives in regions strongly influenced by flood cycles. The intestines can become larger in periods of food scarcity, which allows it to eat items that are more difficult for it to digest, like plant material. Juveniles, being smaller, are not afforded as much flexibility, and as such are sometimes more carnivorous than the omnivorous adults.

Other studies report that the juveniles are more herbivorous than the adults, but this is likely explained by environmental differences; there is also evidence that general food abundance influences diet (such as increased allochthonous plant consumption in areas with plentiful riparian vegetation), which means that the role of A. abramis in the trophic system changes depending on the region. Disregarding age, however, smaller adults also tend to be more carnivorous than larger adults, further diversifying observed feeding habits.

== Conservation status ==
Astyanax abramis has been evaluated by the IUCN Red List as "Least Concern" due to its wide distribution and the fact that it can easily be collected in various locations. For instance, in an evaluation of the fish fauna of the Yabotí stream, Hirt et al. ranked A. abramis as the ninth most abundant species, and the Yabotí stream is largely within the protected Yabotí Biosphere Reserve.
