= Fish anatomy =

Study of the form or morphology of fishes

External anatomy of a bony fish (Hector's lanternfish): 1. operculum (gill cover), 2. lateral line, 3. dorsal fin, 4. adipose fin, 5. caudal peduncle, 6. caudal fin, 7. anal fin, 8. photophores, 9. pelvic fins (paired), 10. pectoral fins (paired)

Internal anatomy of a bony fish

Fish anatomy is the study of the form or morphology of fish. It can be contrasted with fish physiology, which is the study of how the component parts of fish function together in the living fish. In practice, fish anatomy and fish physiology complement each other, the former dealing with the structure of a fish, its organs or component parts and how they are put together, as might be observed on a dissecting table or under a microscope, and the latter dealing with how those components function together in living fish.

The anatomy of fish is often shaped by the physical characteristics of water, the medium in which fish live. Water is much denser than air, holds a relatively small amount of dissolved oxygen, and absorbs more light than air does. The body of a fish is divided into a head, trunk and tail, although the divisions between the three are not always externally visible. The skeleton, which forms the support structure inside the fish, is either made of cartilage (cartilaginous fish) or bone (bony fish). The main skeletal element is the vertebral column, composed of articulating vertebrae which are lightweight yet strong. The ribs attach to the spine and there are no limbs or limb girdles. The main external features of the fish, the fins, are composed of either bony or soft spines called rays which, with the exception of the caudal fins, have no direct connection with the spine. They are supported by the muscles that make up most of the trunk. The heart has two chambers and pumps the blood through the respiratory surfaces of the gills and then around the body in a single circulatory loop. The eyes are adapted for seeing underwater and have only local vision. There is an inner ear but no external or middle ear. Low-frequency vibrations are detected by the lateral line system of sense organs that run along the length of the sides of fish, which responds to nearby movements and to changes in water pressure.

Sharks and rays are basal fish with numerous primitive anatomical features similar to those of ancient fish, including skeletons composed of cartilage. Their bodies tend to be dorso-ventrally flattened, and they usually have five pairs of gill slits and a large mouth set on the underside of the head. The dermis is covered with separate dermal placoid scales. They have a cloaca into which the urinary and genital passages open, but not a swim bladder. Cartilaginous fish produce a small number of large yolky eggs. Some species are ovoviviparous, having the young develop internally, but others are oviparous and the larvae develop externally in egg cases.

The bony fish lineage shows more derived anatomical traits, often with major evolutionary changes from the features of ancient fish. They have a bony skeleton, are generally laterally flattened, have five pairs of gills protected by an operculum, and a mouth at or near the tip of the snout. The dermis is covered with overlapping scales. Bony fish have a swim bladder which helps them maintain a constant depth in the water column, but not a cloaca. They mostly spawn a large number of small eggs with little yolk which they broadcast into the water column.

== Body ==
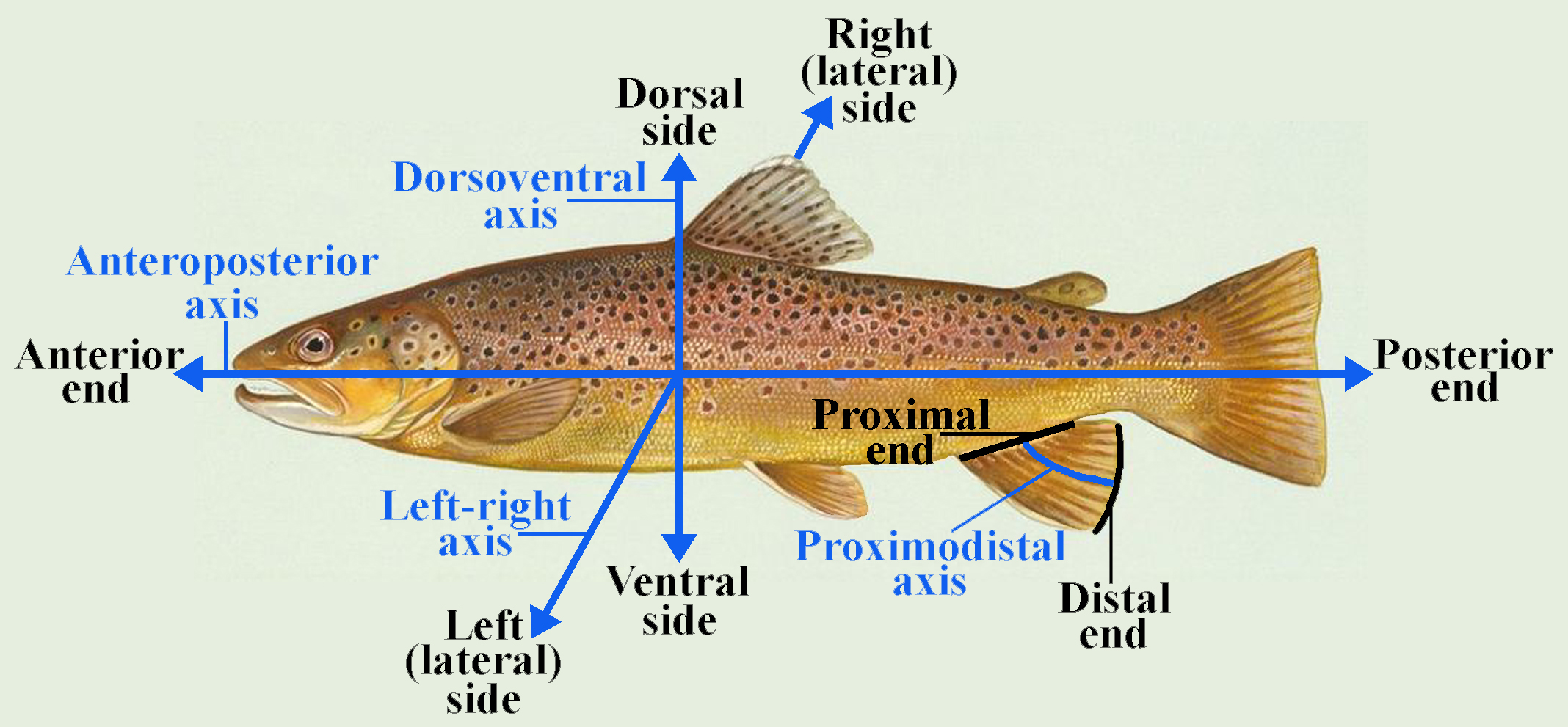
Anatomical directions and axes (of a brown trout)

In many respects, fish anatomy is different from mammalian anatomy. However, it still shares the same basic body plan from which all vertebrates have evolved: a notochord, rudimentary vertebrae, and a well-defined head and tail.

Fish have a variety of different body plans. At the broadest level, their body is divided into the head, trunk, and tail, although the divisions are not always externally visible. The body is often fusiform, a streamlined body plan often found in fast-moving fish. Some species may be filiform (eel-shaped) or vermiform (worm-shaped). Fish are often either compressed (laterally thin and tall) or depressed (dorso-ventrally flattened).

== Skeleton ==
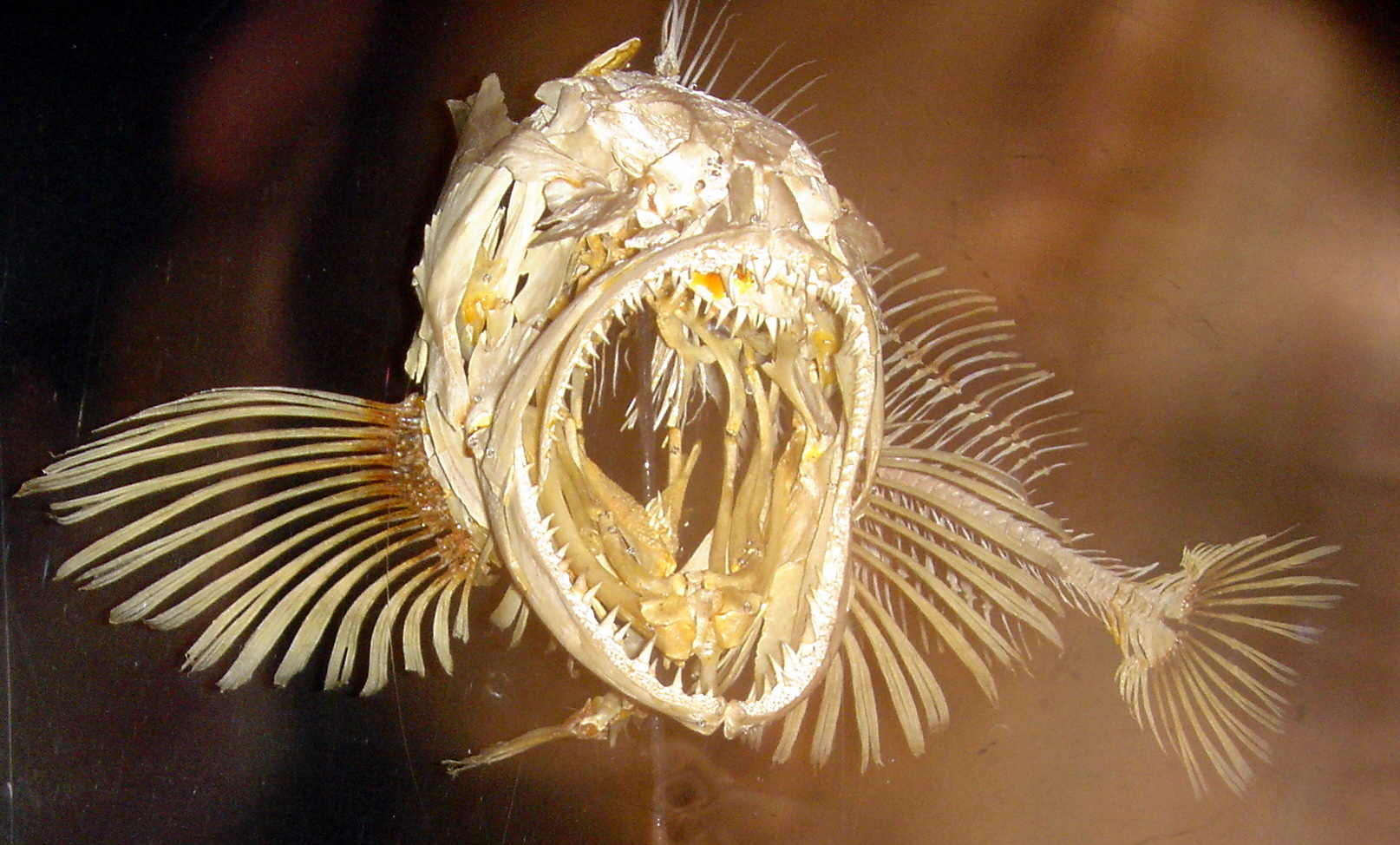
Skeleton of a bony fish, the lingcod

There are two different skeletal types: the exoskeleton, which is the stable outer shell of an organism, and the endoskeleton, which forms the support structure inside the body. The skeleton of the fish is made of either cartilage (cartilaginous fishes) or bone (bony fishes). The endoskeleton of the fish is made up of two main components: the axial skeleton consisting of the skull and vertebral column, and the appendicular skeleton supporting the fins. The fins are made up of bony fin rays and, except for the caudal fin, have no direct connection with the spine. They are supported only by the muscles. The ribs attach to the spine.

Bones are rigid organs that form part of the endoskeleton of vertebrates. They function to move, support, and protect the various organs of the body, produce red and white blood cells and store minerals. Bone tissue is a type of dense connective tissue. Bones come in a variety of shapes and have a complex internal and external structure. They are lightweight, yet strong and hard, in addition to fulfilling their many other biological functions.

== Vertebrae ==
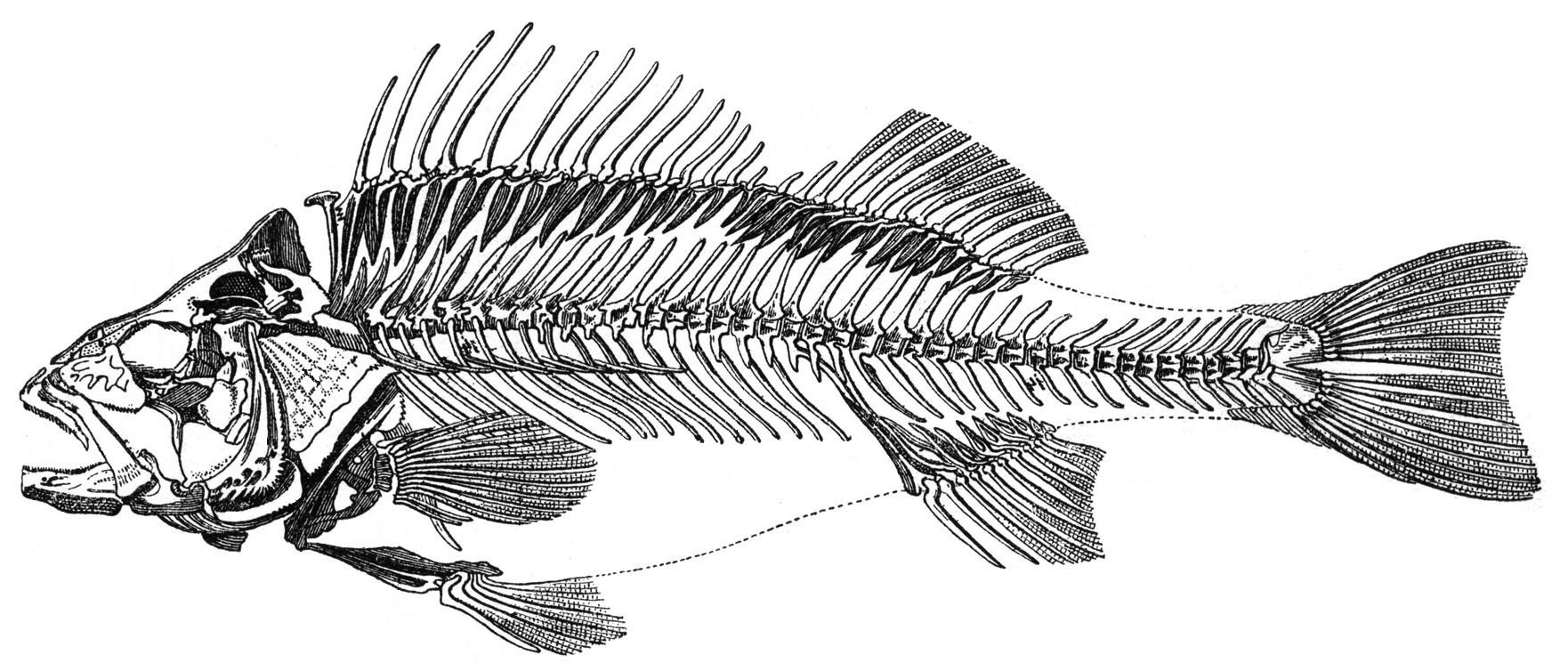
Skeletal structure of a bass showing the vertebral column running from the head to the tail

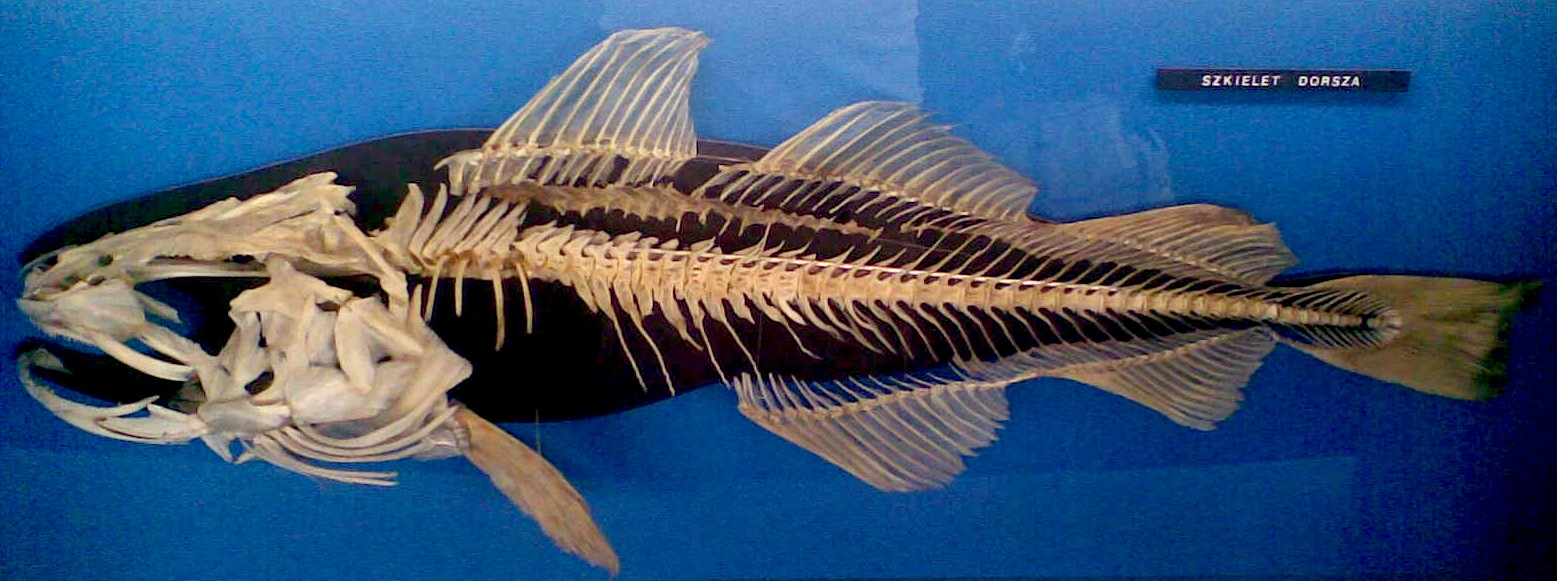
Skeletal structure of an Atlantic cod

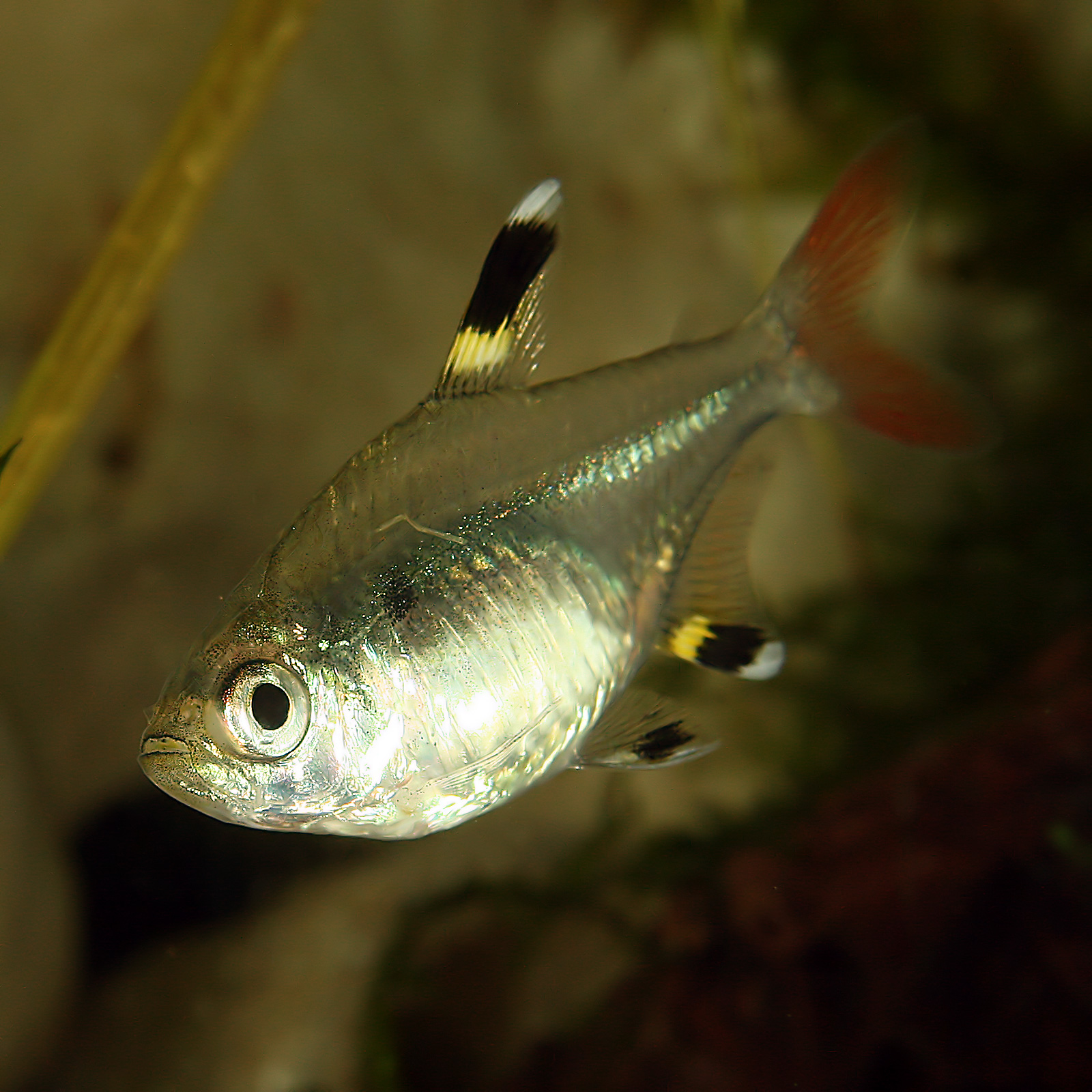
The X-ray tetra (Pristella maxillaris) has a visible backbone. The spinal cord is housed within its backbone.

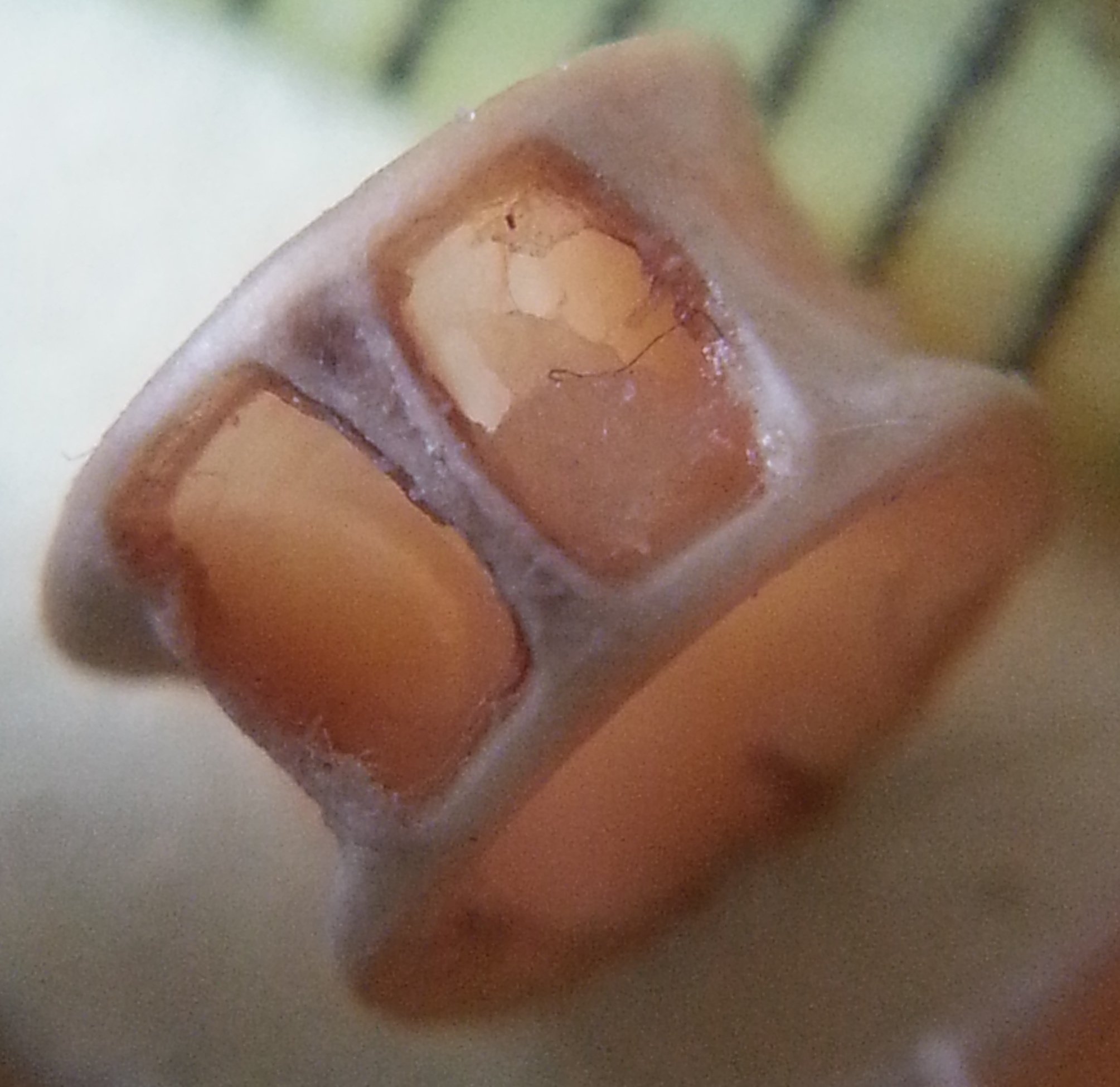
A vertebra (diameter 5 mm (0.20 in)) of a small ray-finned fish

Fish are vertebrates. All vertebrates are built along the basic chordate body plan: a stiff rod running through the length of the animal (vertebral column or notochord), with a hollow tube of nervous tissue (the spinal cord) above it and the gastrointestinal tract below. In all vertebrates, the mouth is found at, or right below, the anterior end of the animal, while the anus opens to the exterior before the end of the body. The remaining part of the body beyond the anus forms a tail with vertebrae and the spinal cord, but no gut.

The defining characteristic of a vertebrate is the vertebral column, in which the notochord (a stiff rod of uniform composition) found in all chordates has been replaced by a segmented series of stiffer elements (vertebrae) separated by mobile joints (intervertebral discs, derived embryonically and evolutionarily from the notochord). However, a few fish have secondarily lost this anatomy, retaining the notochord into adulthood, such as the sturgeon.

The vertebral column consists of a centrum (the central body or spine of the vertebra), vertebral arches which protrude from the top and bottom of the centrum, and various processes which project from the centrum or arches. An arch extending from the top of the centrum is called a neural arch, while the haemal arch or chevron is found underneath the centrum in the caudal vertebrae of fish. The centrum of a fish is usually concave at each end (amphicoelous), which limits the motion of the fish. In contrast, the centrum of a mammal is flat at each end (acoelous), a shape that can support and distribute compressive forces.

The vertebrae of lobe-finned fishes consist of three discrete bony elements. The vertebral arch surrounds the spinal cord, and is broadly similar in form to that found in most other vertebrates. Just beneath the arch lies the small plate-like pleurocentrum, which protects the upper surface of the notochord. Below that, a larger arch-shaped intercentrum protects the lower border. Both of these structures are embedded within a single cylindrical mass of cartilage. A similar arrangement was found in primitive tetrapods, but in the evolutionary line that led to reptiles, mammals and birds, the intercentrum became partially or wholly replaced by an enlarged pleurocentrum, which in turn became the bony vertebral body.

In most ray-finned fishes, including all teleosts, these two structures are fused with and embedded within a solid piece of bone superficially resembling the vertebral body of mammals. In living amphibians, there is simply a cylindrical piece of bone below the vertebral arch, with no trace of the separate elements present in the early tetrapods.

In cartilaginous fish such as sharks, the vertebrae consist of two cartilaginous tubes. The upper tube is formed from the vertebral arches, but also includes additional cartilaginous structures filling in the gaps between the vertebrae, enclosing the spinal cord in an essentially continuous sheath. The lower tube surrounds the notochord and has a complex structure, often including multiple layers of calcification.

Lampreys have vertebral arches, but nothing resembling the vertebral bodies found in all higher vertebrates. Even the arches are discontinuous, consisting of separate pieces of arch-shaped cartilage around the spinal cord in most parts of the body, changing to long strips of cartilage above and below in the tail region. Hagfishes lack a true vertebral column, but a few tiny neural arches are present in the tail. Hagfishes do, however, possess a cranium. For this reason, hagfishes have sometimes been excluded from Vertebrata in the past, and instead placed as a sister group of vertebrates within the taxon "Craniata". Molecular analyses since 1992 have shown that hagfishes are the sister group of lampreys within the clade Cyclostomi, and therefore are vertebrates in a phylogenetic sense.

== Head ==
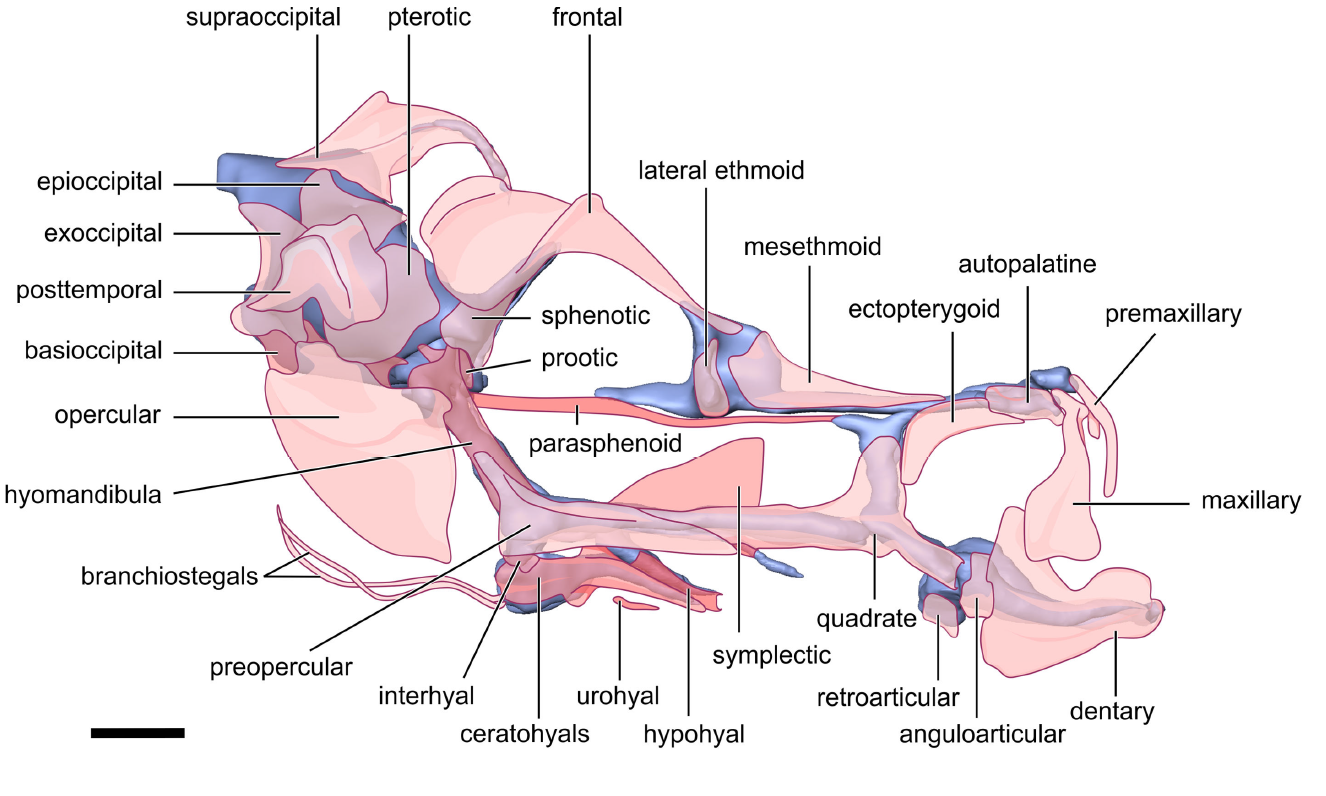
Skull bones as they appear in a seahorse

Positions of fish mouths: terminal (a), superior (b), and subterminal or inferior (c).

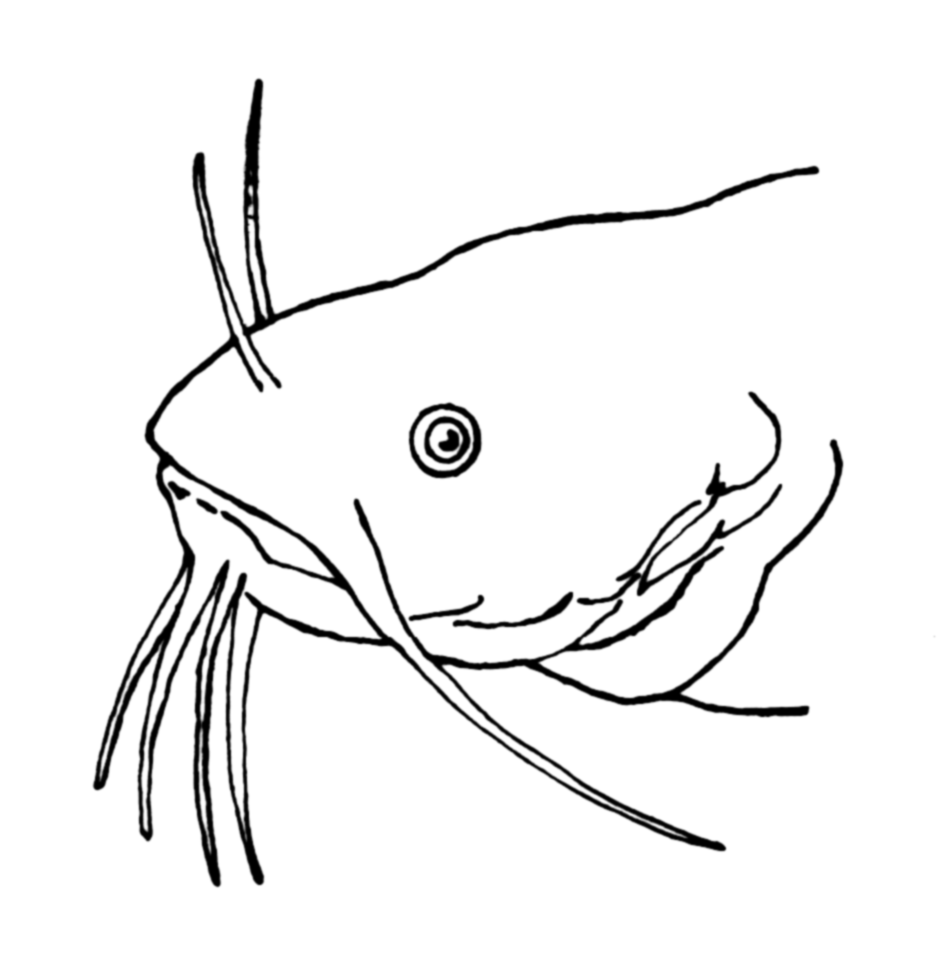
Illustration of barbels on the head of a fish

The head or skull includes the skull roof (a set of bones covering the brain, eyes and nostrils), the snout (from the eye to the forward-most point of the upper jaw), the operculum or gill cover (absent in sharks and jawless fish), and the cheek, which extends from the eye to the preopercle. The operculum and preopercle may or may not have spines. In sharks and some primitive bony fish the spiracle, a small extra gill opening, is found behind each eye.

The skull in fishes is formed from a series of only loosely connected bones. Jawless fish and sharks only possess a cartilaginous endocranium, with the upper and lower jaws of cartilaginous fish being separate elements not attached to the skull. Bony fishes have additional dermal bone, forming a more or less coherent skull roof in lungfish and holost fish. The lower jaw defines a chin.

In lampreys, the mouth is formed into an oral disk. In most jawed fish, however, there are three general configurations. The mouth may be on the forward end of the head (terminal), may be upturned (superior), or may be turned downwards or on the bottom of the fish (subterminal or inferior). The mouth may be modified into a suckermouth adapted for clinging onto objects in fast-moving water.

The simpler structure is found in jawless fish, in which the cranium is represented by a trough-like basket of cartilaginous elements only partially enclosing the brain and associated with the capsules for the inner ears and the single nostril. Distinctively, these fish have no jaws.

Cartilaginous fish such as sharks also have simple, and presumably primitive, skull structures. The cranium is a single structure forming a case around the brain, enclosing the lower surface and the sides, but always at least partially open at the top as a large fontanelle. The most anterior part of the cranium includes a forward plate of cartilage, the rostrum, and capsules to enclose the olfactory organs. Behind these are the orbits, and then an additional pair of capsules enclosing the structure of the inner ear. Finally, the skull tapers towards the rear, where the foramen magnum lies immediately above a single condyle, articulating with the first vertebra. Smaller foramina for the cranial nerves can be found at various points throughout the cranium. The jaws consist of separate hoops of cartilage, almost always distinct from the cranium proper.

In the ray-finned fishes, there has also been considerable modification from the primitive pattern. The roof of the skull is generally well formed, and although the exact relationship of its bones to those of tetrapods is unclear, they are usually given similar names for convenience. Other elements of the skull, however, may be reduced; there is little cheek region behind the enlarged orbits, and little if any bone in between them. The upper jaw is often formed largely from the premaxilla, with the maxilla itself located further back, and an additional bone, the symplectic, linking the jaw to the rest of the cranium.

Although the skulls of fossil lobe-finned fish resemble those of the early tetrapods, the same cannot be said of those of the living lungfishes. The skull roof is not fully formed, and consists of multiple, somewhat irregularly shaped bones with no direct relationship to those of tetrapods. The upper jaw is formed from the pterygoid bones and vomers alone, all of which bear teeth. Much of the skull is formed from cartilage, and its overall structure is reduced.

The head may have several fleshy structures known as barbels, which may be very long and resemble whiskers. Many fish species also have a variety of protrusions or spines on the head. The nostrils or nares of almost all fishes do not connect to the oral cavity, but are pits of varying shape and depth.

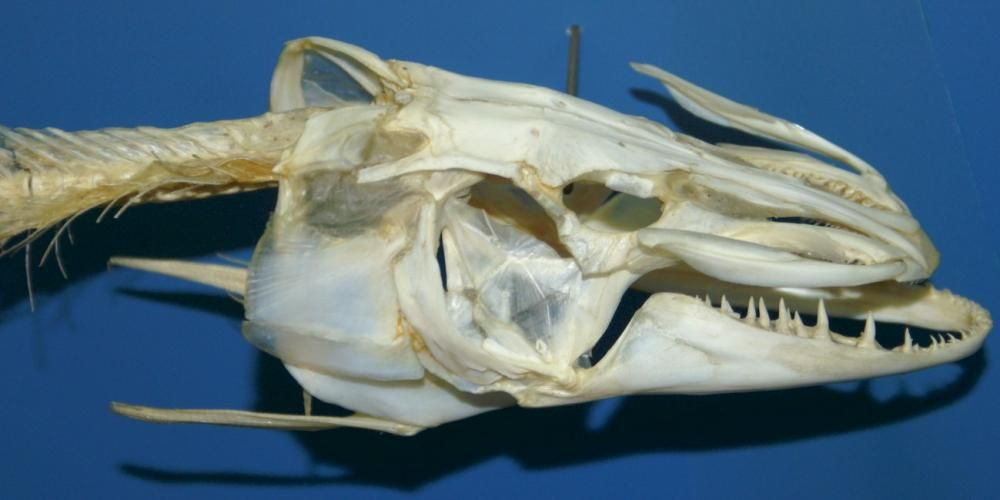
Skull of a northern pike

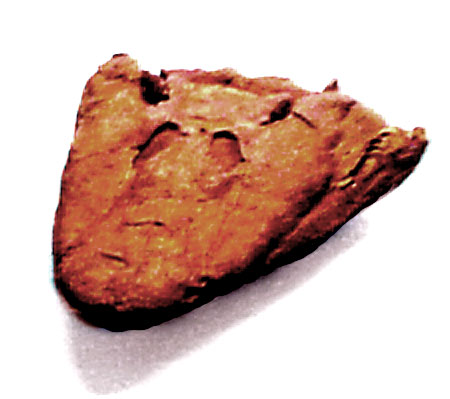
Skull of Tiktaalik, a genus of extinct sarcopterygian (lobe-finned "fish") from the late Devonian period

== External organs ==
=== Jaw ===
Moray eels have two sets of jaws: the oral jaws that capture prey and the pharyngeal jaws that advance into the mouth and move prey from the oral jaws to the esophagus for swallowing.

The vertebrate jaw probably originally evolved in the Silurian period and appeared in the Placoderm fish which further diversified in the Devonian. Jaws are thought to derive from the pharyngeal arches that support the gills in fish. The two most anterior of these arches are thought to have become the jaw itself (see hyomandibula) and the hyoid arch, which braces the jaw against the braincase and increases mechanical efficiency. While there is no fossil evidence directly to support this theory, it makes sense in light of the numbers of pharyngeal arches that are visible in extant jawed animals (the gnathostomes), which have seven arches, and primitive jawless vertebrates (the Agnatha), which have nine.

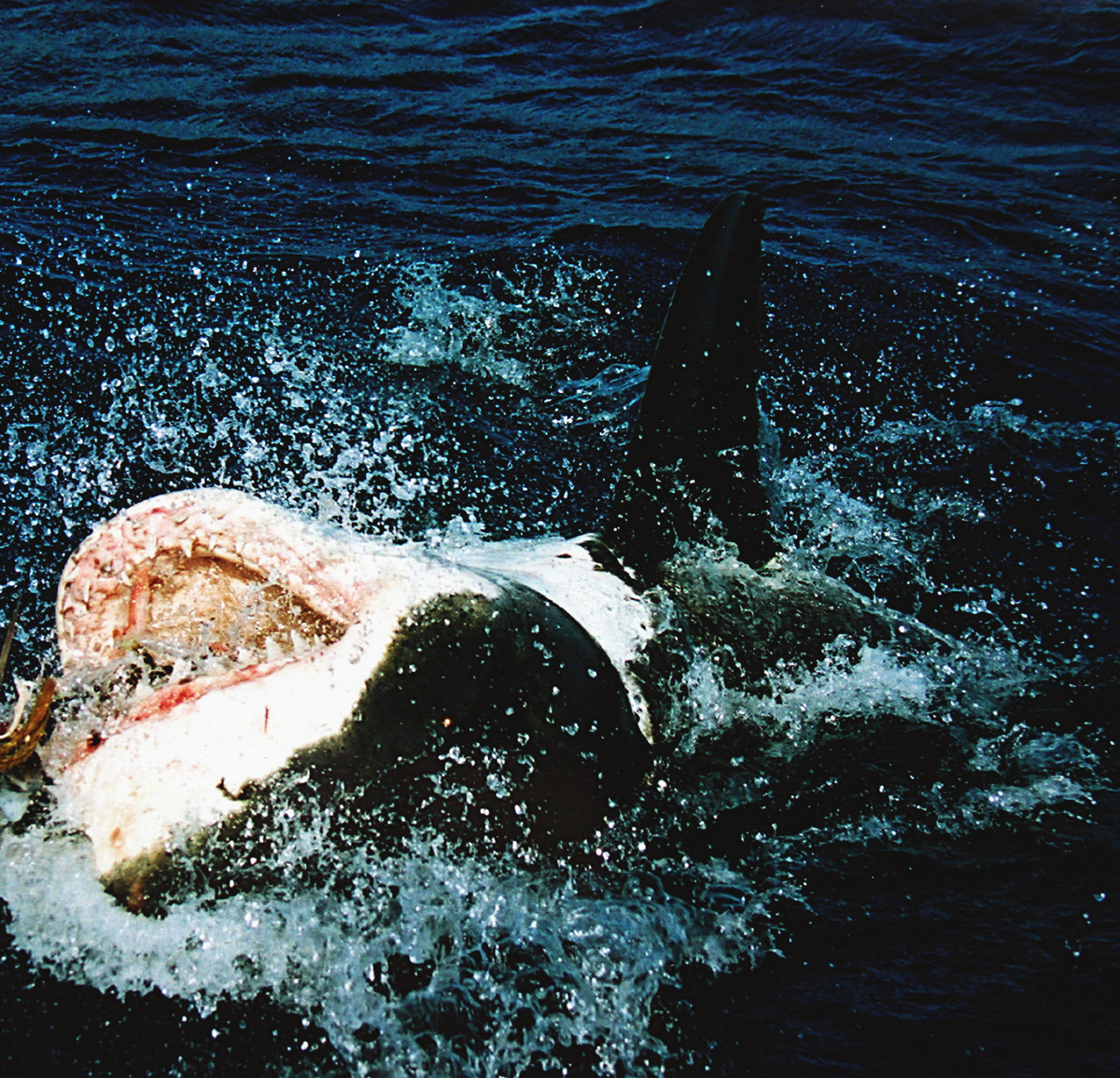
Jaws of a great white shark, a cartilaginous fish

External videos
- Video of a slingjaw wrasse catching prey by protruding its jaw
- Video of a red bay snook catching prey by suction feeding

It is thought that the original selective advantage garnered by the jaw was not related to feeding, but to increase respiration efficiency. The jaws were used in the buccal pump (observable in modern fish and amphibians) that pumps water across the gills of fish or air into the lungs of amphibians. Over evolutionary time, the more familiar use of jaws in feeding was selected for and became a very important function in vertebrates.

Linkage systems are widely distributed in animals. The most thorough overview of the different types of linkages in animals has been provided by M. Muller, who also designed a new classification system which is especially well suited for biological systems. Linkage mechanisms are especially frequent and various in the head of bony fishes, such as wrasses, which have evolved many specialized aquatic feeding mechanisms. Especially advanced are the linkage mechanisms of jaw protrusion. For suction feeding a system of connected four-bar linkages is responsible for the coordinated opening of the mouth and 3-D expansion of the buccal cavity. Other linkages are responsible for protrusion of the premaxilla.

=== Eyes ===
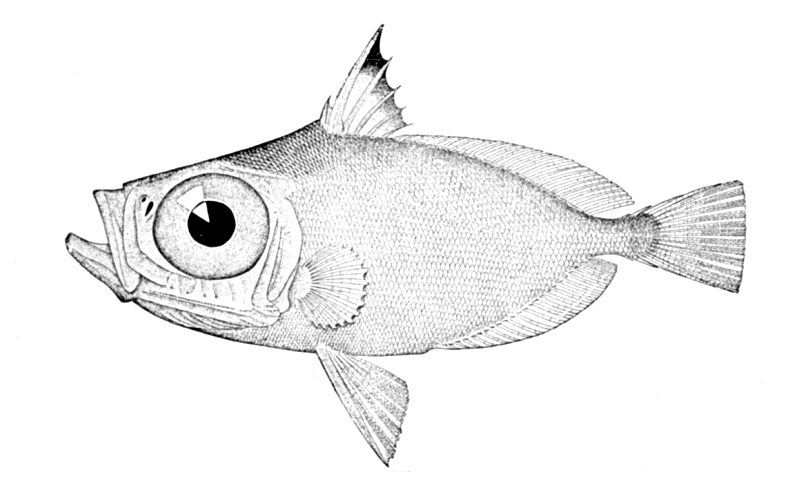
Zenion hololepis is a small deep water fish with large eyes.

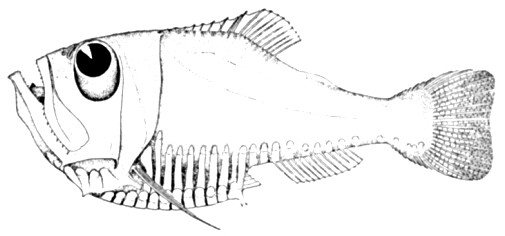
The deep sea half-naked hatchetfish has eyes which look overhead where it can see the silhouettes of prey.

Fish eyes are similar to terrestrial vertebrates like birds and mammals, but have a more spherical lens. Their retinas generally have both rod cells and cone cells (for scotopic and photopic vision), and most species have colour vision. Some fish can see ultraviolet and some can see polarized light. Amongst jawless fish, the lamprey has well-developed eyes, while the hagfish has only primitive eyespots. The ancestors of modern hagfish, thought to be protovertebrate, were evidently pushed to very deep, dark waters, where they were less vulnerable to sighted predators and where it is advantageous to have a convex eyespot, which gathers more light than a flat or concave one. Unlike humans, fish normally adjust focus by moving the lens closer to or further from the retina.

=== Gills ===
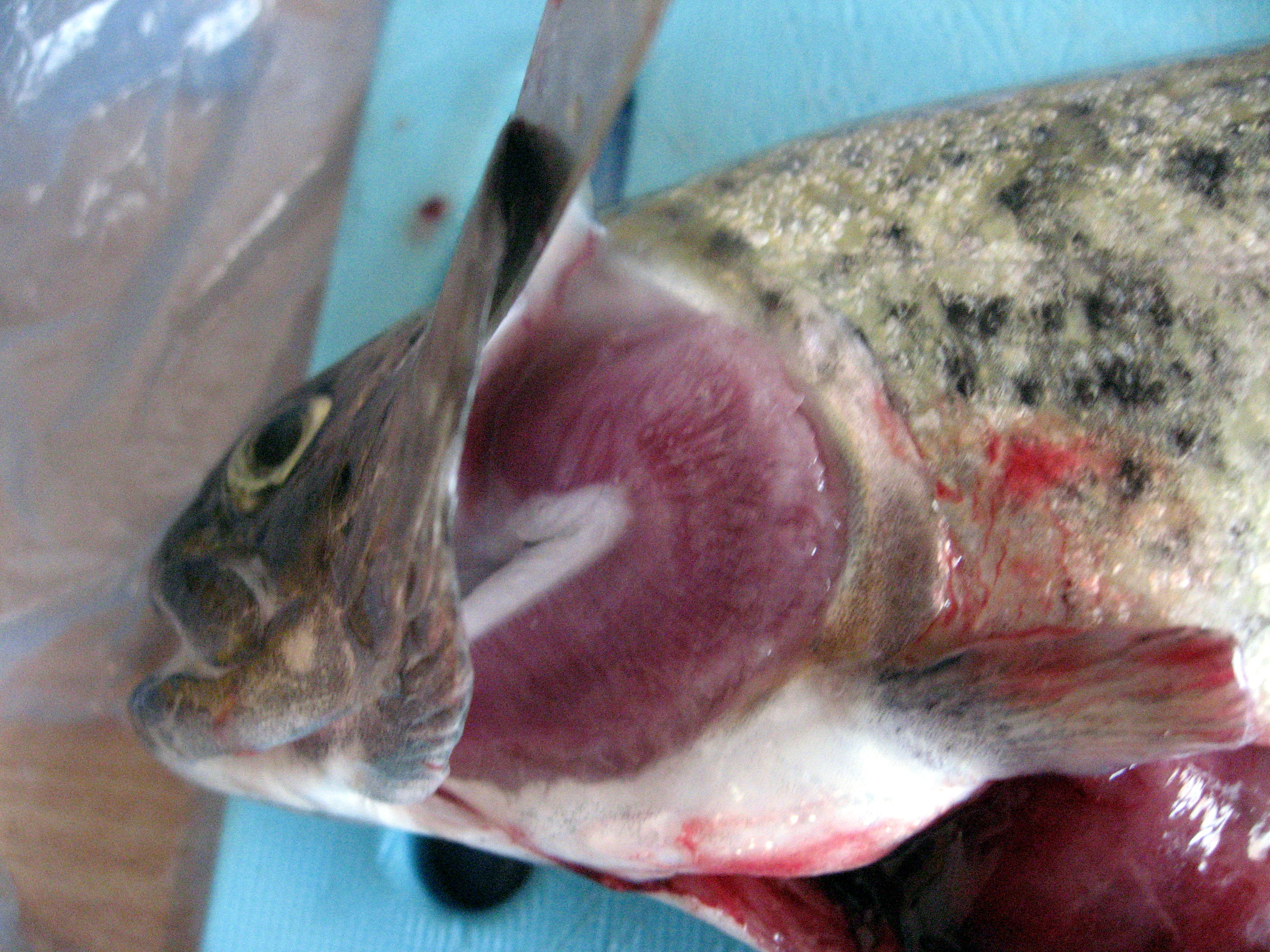
Gills of a rainbow trout

Fish gills are organs that allow fish to breathe underwater, exchanging gases like oxygen and carbon dioxide.

Some fish, like sharks and lampreys, possess multiple gill openings, but the most abundant group of fish alive, the bony fish, have a single gill opening on each side. This opening is hidden beneath a protective cover called the operculum.

Juvenile bichirs have external gills, a very primitive feature that they share with larval amphibians.

=== Skin ===
The skin of the fish are a part of the integumentary system, which contains two layers: the epidermis and the dermis layer. The epidermis is derived from the ectoderm and becomes the most superficial layer that consists entirely of live cells, with only minimal quantities of keratin. It is generally permeable. The dermis is derived from the mesoderm and resembles the little connective tissue which are composed of mostly collagen fibers found in bony fish. Some fish species have scales that emerge from the dermis, penetrate the thin layer of the basement membrane that lies between the epidermis and dermis, and becomes externally visible and covers the epidermis layer.

Generally, the skin also contains sweat glands and sebaceous glands that are both unique to mammals, but additional types of skin glands are found in fish. Found in the epidermis, fish typically have numerous individual mucus-secreting skin cells called goblet cells that produce a slimy substance to the surface of the skin. This aids in insulation and protection from bacterial infection. The skin colour of many mammals are often due to melanin found in their epidermis. In fish, however, the colour of the skin are largely due to chromatophores in the dermis, which, in addition to melanin, may contain guanine or carotenoid pigments. Many species, such as flounders, change the colour of their skin by adjusting the relative size of their chromatophores. Some fishes may also have venom glands, photophores, or cells that produce a more watery serous fluid in the dermis.

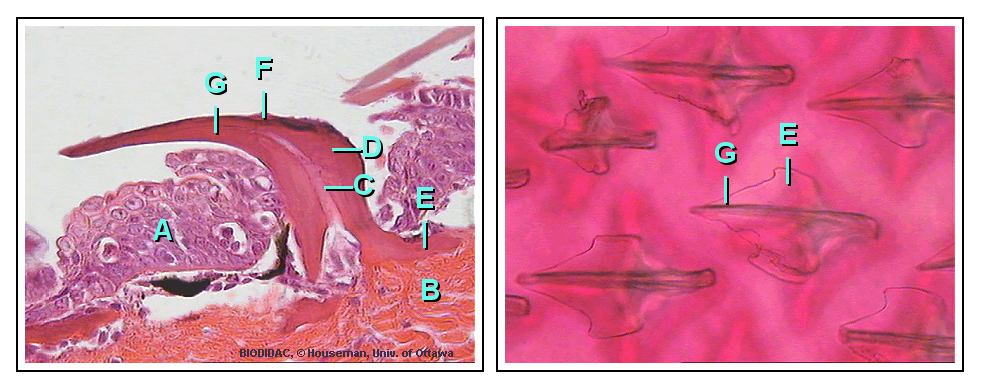
Placoid scales from a shark: A. epidermis; B. bermis; C. pulp core; D. dentine; E. basal plate; F. enamel; G. spine

=== Scales ===
Also part of the fish's integumentary system are the scales that cover the outer body of many jawed fish. The commonly known scales are the ones that originate from the dermis or mesoderm, and may be similar in structure to teeth. Some species are covered by scutes instead. Others may have no scales covering the outer body.

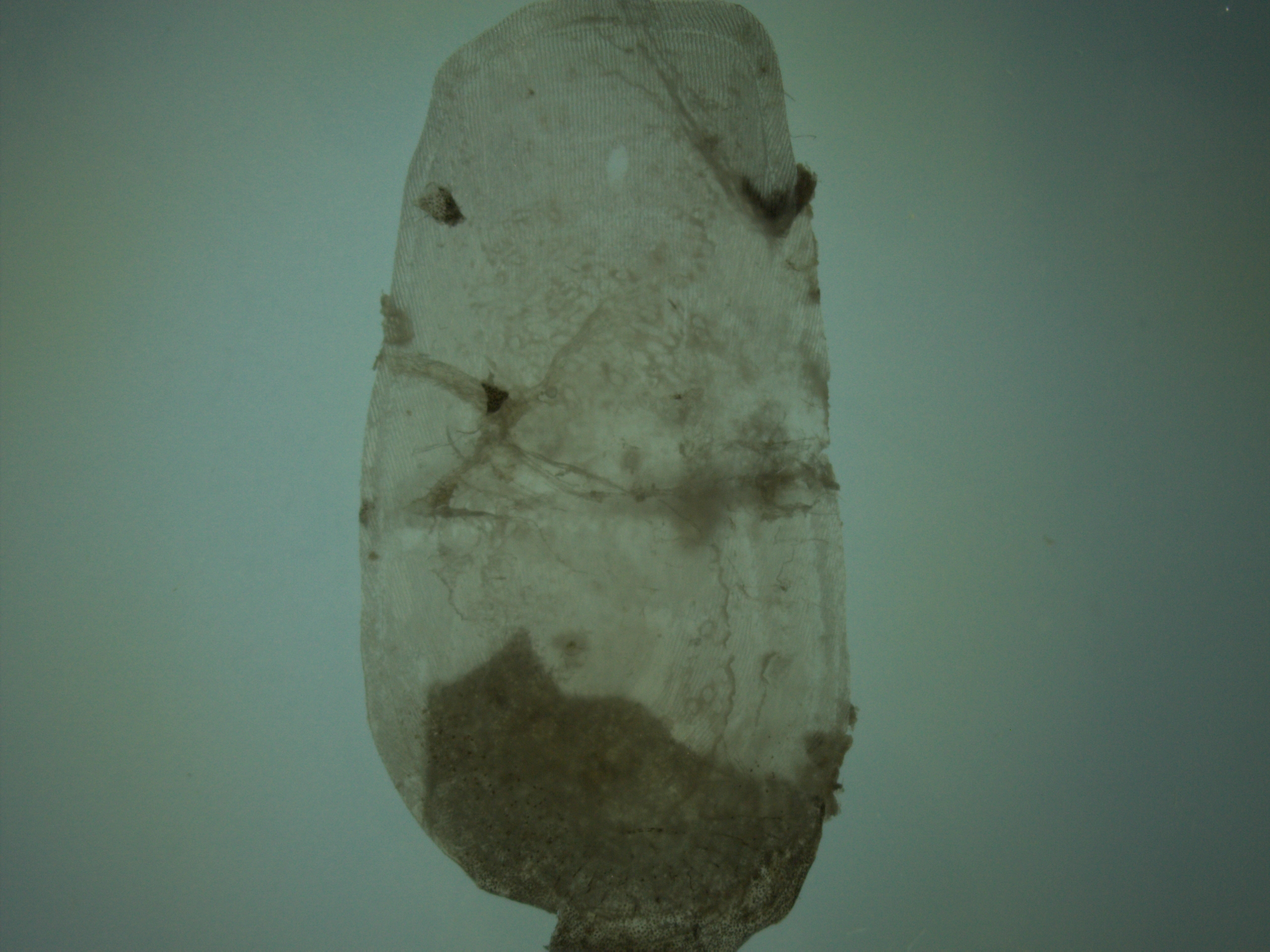
Singular bowfin cycloid scale

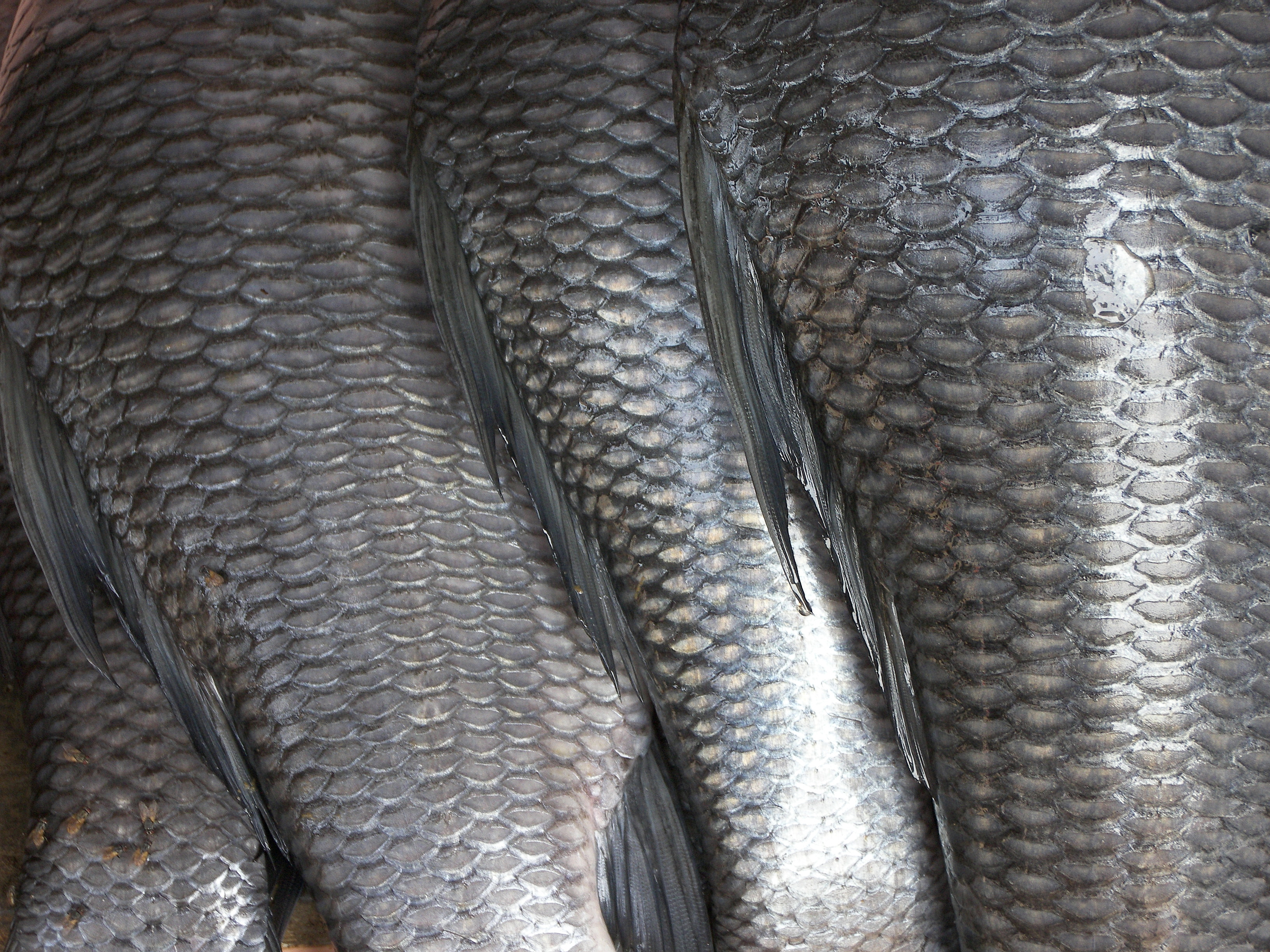
Cycloid scales covering rohu

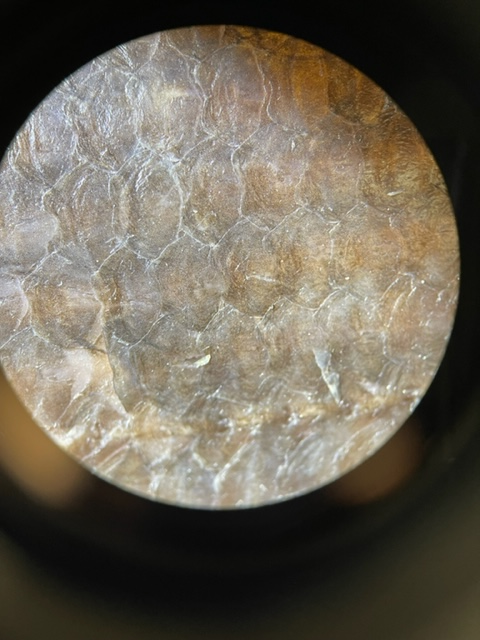
Bowfin cycloid scales

There are four principal types of fish scales that originate from the dermis.

- Placoid scales, also called dermal denticles, are pointed scales. They are similar to the structure of teeth, in which they are made of dentin and covered by enamel. They are typical of cartilaginous fish (even though chimaeras have it on claspers only).
- Ganoid scales are flat, basal-looking scales. Derived from placoid scales, they have a thick coat of enamel, but without the underlying layer of dentin. These scales cover the fish's body with little overlapping. They are typical of gar and bichirs.
- Cycloid scales are small, oval-shaped scales with growth rings like the rings of a tree. They lack enamel, dentin, and a vascular bone layer. Bowfin and remora have cycloid scales.
- Ctenoid scales are similar to cycloid scales, also having growth rings, lack enamel, dentin, and a vascular bone layer. They are distinguished by spines or projections along one edge. Halibut have this type of scale.
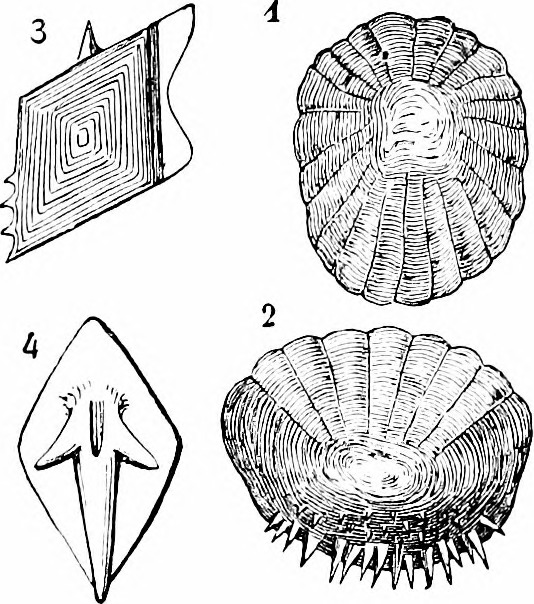
Fish scales: 1. cycloid scale; 2. ctenoid scale; 3. placcoid scale; 4. ganoid scale

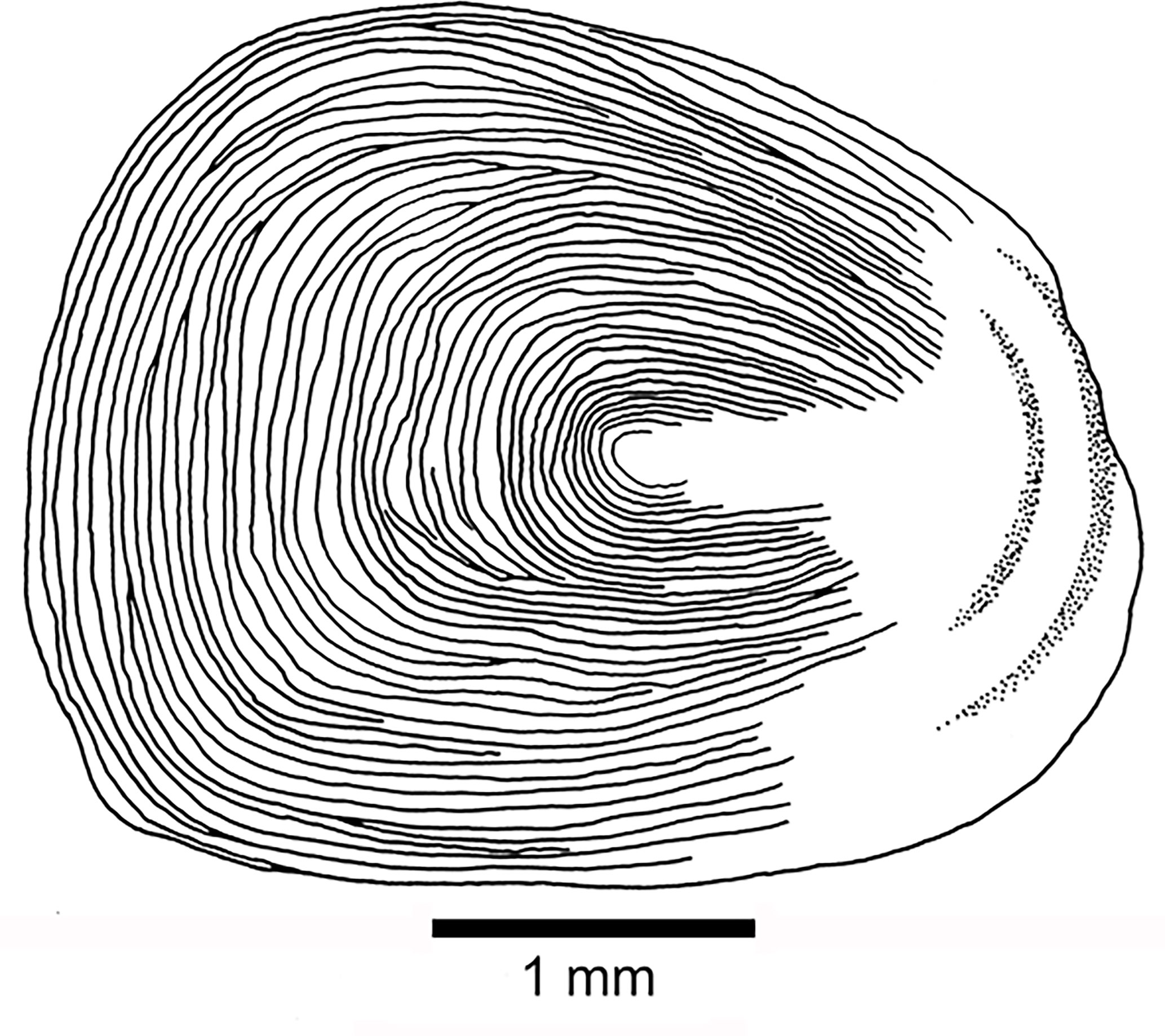
Cycloid scale

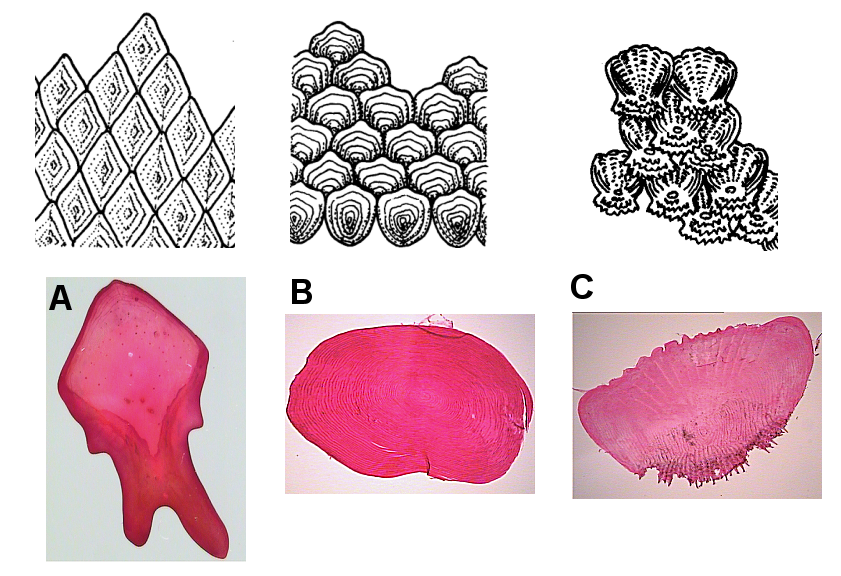
Fish scales: A. ganoid; B. cycloid; C. ctenoid

=== Lateral line ===
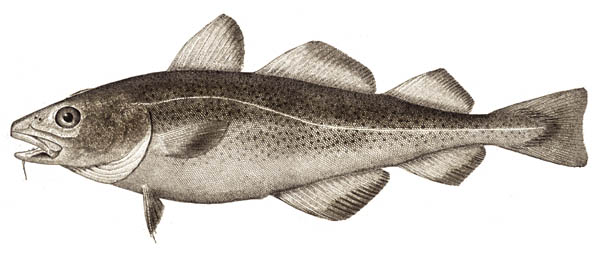
The lateral line is clearly visible as a line of receptors running along the side of this Atlantic cod.

The lateral line is a sense organ used to detect movement and vibration in the surrounding water. For example, fish can use their lateral line system to follow the vortices produced by fleeing prey. In most species, it consists of a line of receptors running along each side of the fish.

=== Photophores ===
Photophores are glandular organs present in some deep-sea animals, including fish and cephalopods, for producing light through bioluminescence, not for absorbing it.

They are used to attract preys, camouflage from predators, and attract mates for reproduction.

=== Fins ===
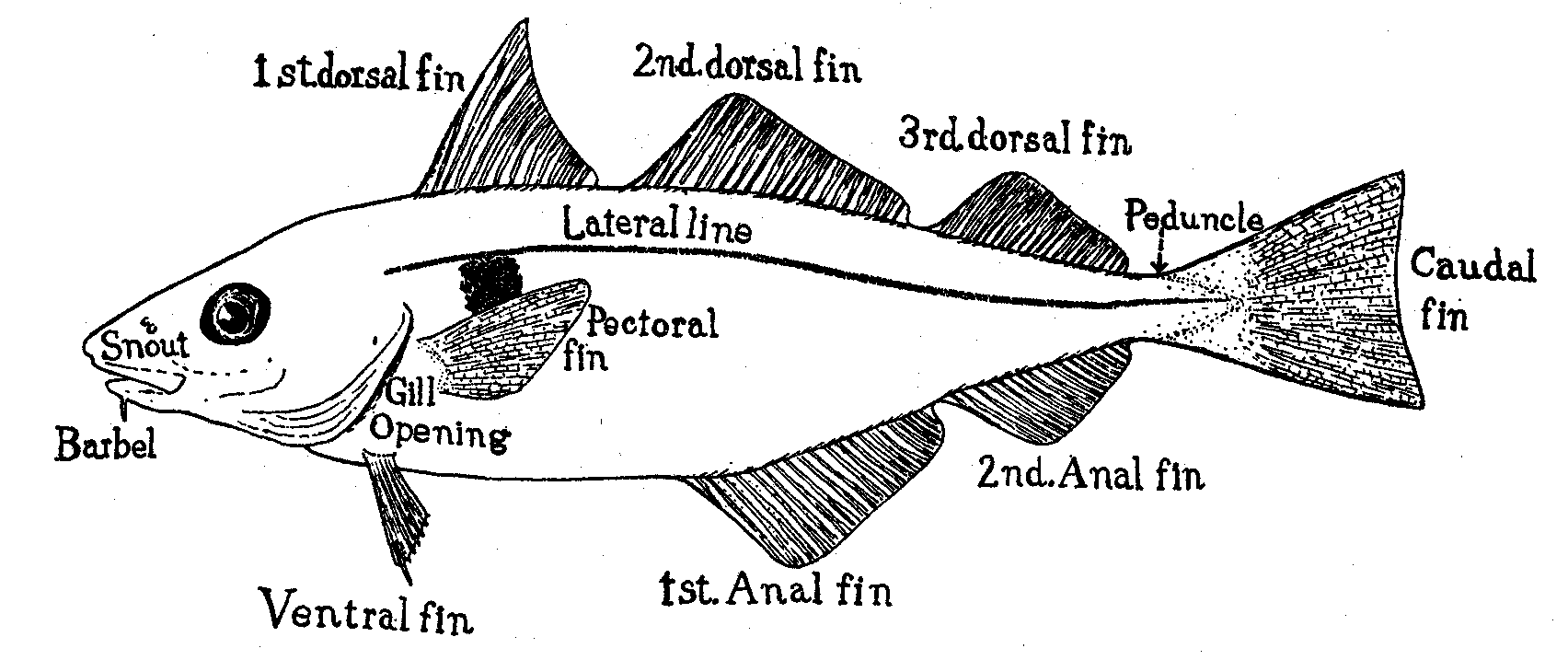
The haddock, a type of cod, is ray-finned. It has three dorsal and two anal fins.

Types of caudal fin: heterocercal (A), protocercal (B), homocercal (C), and diphycercal (D)

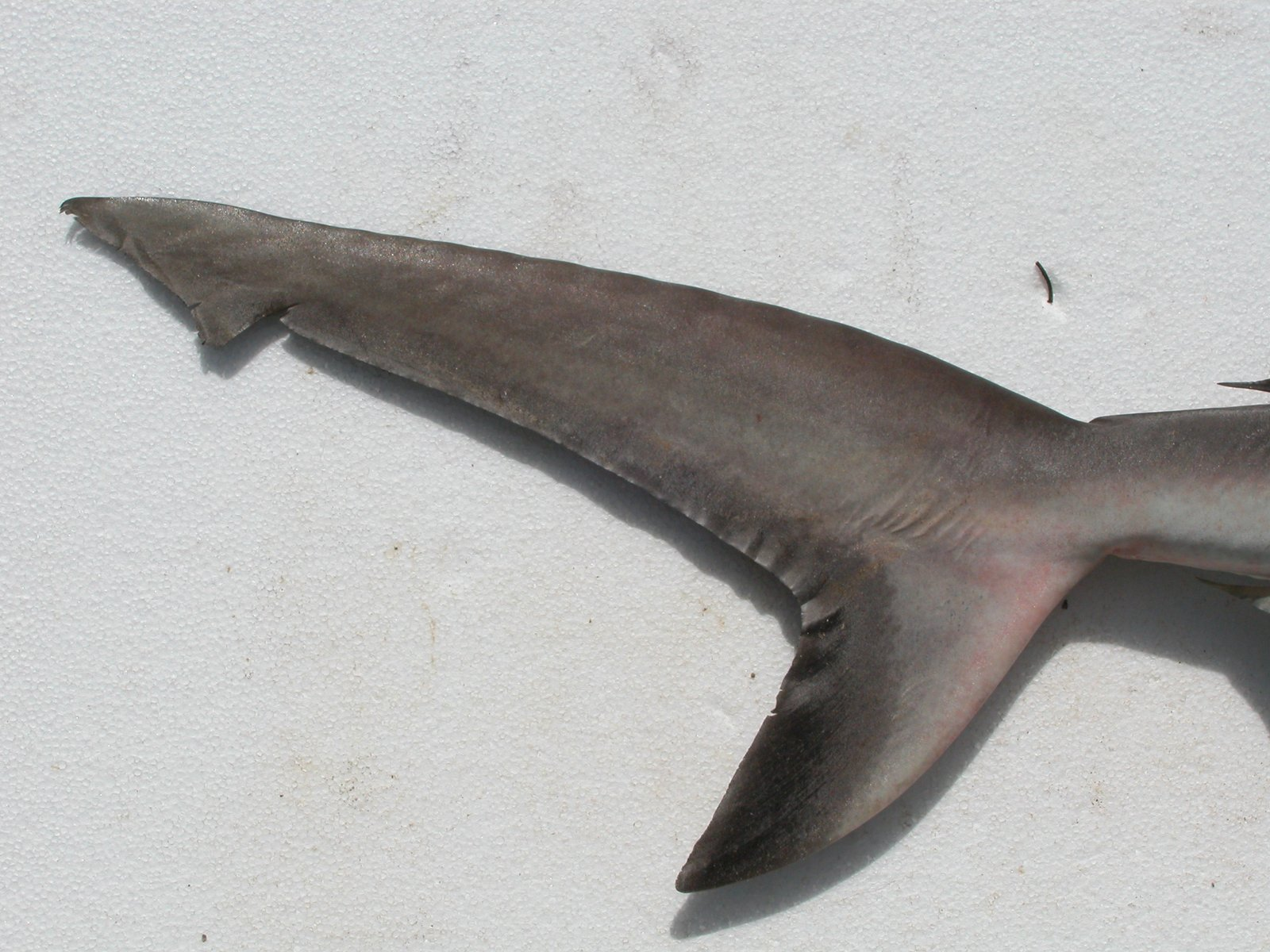
Sharks possess a heterocercal caudal fin. The dorsal portion is usually larger than the ventral portion.

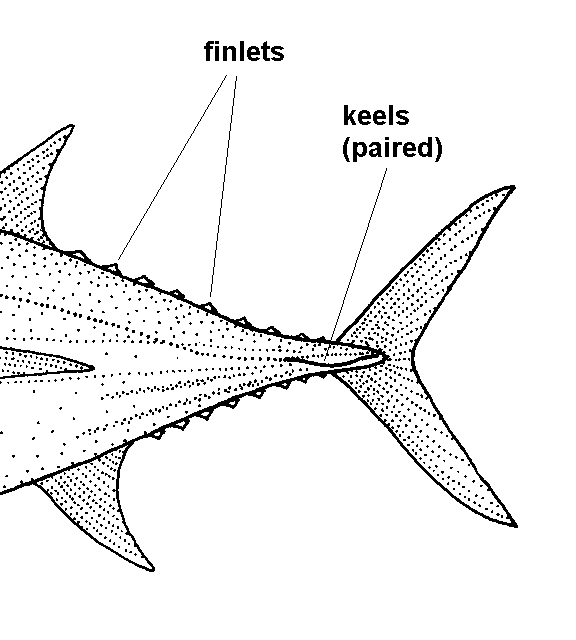
The high performance bigeye tuna is equipped with a homocercal caudal fin, finlets and keels.

Fins are the most distinctive features of fish. They are either composed of bony spines or rays protruding from the body with skin covering them and joining them together, either in a webbed fashion as seen in most bony fish, or similar to a flipper as seen in sharks. Apart from the tail or caudal fin, fins have no direct connection with the spine and are supported by muscles only. Their principal function is to help the fish swim. Fins can also be used for gliding or crawling, as seen in the flying fish and frogfish. Fins located in different places on the fish serve different purposes, such as moving forward, turning, and keeping an upright position. For every fin, there are a number of fish species in which this particular fin has been lost during evolution.

==== Spines and rays ====
Spines have a variety of uses. In catfish, they are used as a form of defense; many catfish have the ability to lock their spines outwards. Triggerfish also use spines to lock themselves in crevices to prevent them being pulled out.

Lepidotrichia are bony, bilaterally-paired, segmented fin rays found in bony fishes. They develop around actinotrichia as part of the dermal exoskeleton. Lepidotrichia may have some cartilage or bone in them as well. They are actually segmented and appear as a series of disks stacked one on top of another. The genetic basis for the formation of the fin rays is thought to be genes coding for the proteins actinodin 1 and actinodin 2.

==== Types of fin ====
- Dorsal fins: Located on the back of the fish, dorsal fins serve to prevent the fish from rolling and assist in sudden turns and stops. Most fishes have one dorsal fin, but some fishes have two or three. In anglerfish, the anterior of the dorsal fin is modified into an illicium and esca, a biological equivalent to a fishing rod and lure. The two to three bones that support the dorsal fin are called the proximal, middle, and distal pterygiophores. In spinous fins, the distal pterygiophore is often fused to the middle or not present at all.
- Caudal/Tail fins: Also called the tail fins, caudal fins are attached to the end of the caudal peduncle and used for propulsion. The caudal peduncle is the narrow part of the fish's body. The hypural joint is the joint between the caudal fin and the last of the vertebrae. The hypural is often fan-shaped. The tail may be heterocercal, reversed heterocercal, protocercal, diphycercal, or homocercal.
  - Heterocercal: vertebrae extend into the upper lobe of the tail, making it longer (as in sharks)
  - Reversed heterocercal: vertebrae extend into the lower lobe of the tail, making it longer (as in the Anaspida)
  - Protocercal: vertebrae extend to the tip of the tail; the tail is symmetrical but not expanded (as in cyclostomatans, the ancestral vertebrates and lancelets).
  - Diphycercal: vertebrae extend to the tip of the tail; the tail is symmetrical and expanded (as in the bichir, lungfish, lamprey and coelacanth). Most Palaeozoic fishes had a diphycercal heterocercal tail.
  - Homocercal: vertebrae extend a very short distance into the upper lobe of the tail; tail still appears superficially symmetric. Most fish have a homocercal tail, but it can be expressed in a variety of shapes. The tail fin can be rounded at the end, truncated (almost vertical edge, as in salmon), forked (ending in two prongs), emarginate (with a slight inward curve), or continuous (dorsal, caudal, and anal fins attached, as in eels).
- Anal fins: Located on the ventral surface behind the anus, this fin is used to stabilize the fish while swimming.
- Pectoral fins: Found in pairs on each side, usually just behind the operculum. Pectoral fins are homologous to the forelimbs of tetrapods, and aid walking in several fish species such as some anglerfish and the mudskipper. A peculiar function of pectoral fins, highly developed in some fish, is the creation of the dynamic lifting force that assists some fish such as sharks in maintaining depth and also enables the "flight" for flying fish. Certain rays of the pectoral fins may be adapted into finger-like projections, such as in sea robins and flying gurnards.
  - "Cephalic fins": The "horns" of manta rays and their relatives, sometimes called cephalic fins, are actually a modification of the anterior portion of the pectoral fin.
- Pelvic/Ventral fins: Found in pairs on each side ventrally below the pectoral fins, pelvic fins are homologous to the hindlimbs of tetrapods. They assist the fish in going up or down through the water, turning sharply, and stopping quickly. In gobies, the pelvic fins are often fused into a single sucker disk that can be used to attach to objects.
- Adipose fin: A soft, fleshy fin found on the back behind the dorsal fin and just in front of the caudal fin. It is absent in many fish families, but is found in Salmonidae, characins and catfishes. Its function has remained a mystery, and is frequently clipped off to mark hatchery-raised fish, though data from 2005 showed that trout with their adipose fin removed have an 8% higher tailbeat frequency. Additional research published in 2011 has suggested that the fin may be vital for the detection of and response to stimuli such as touch, sound and changes in pressure. Canadian researchers identified a neural network in the fin, indicating that it likely has a sensory function, but are still not sure exactly what the consequences of removing it are.

== Internal organs ==
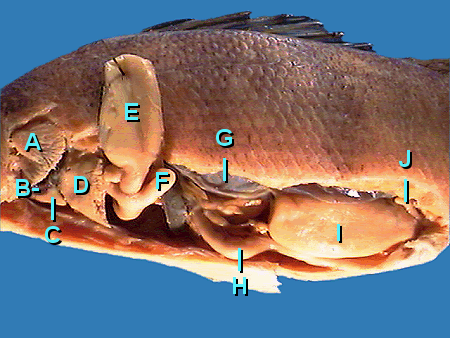
Internal organs of a male yellow perch: A. gill, B. heart atrium, C. heart ventricle, D. liver (cut), E. stomach, F. pyloric caeca, G. swim bladder, H. intestine, I. testis, J. urinary bladder

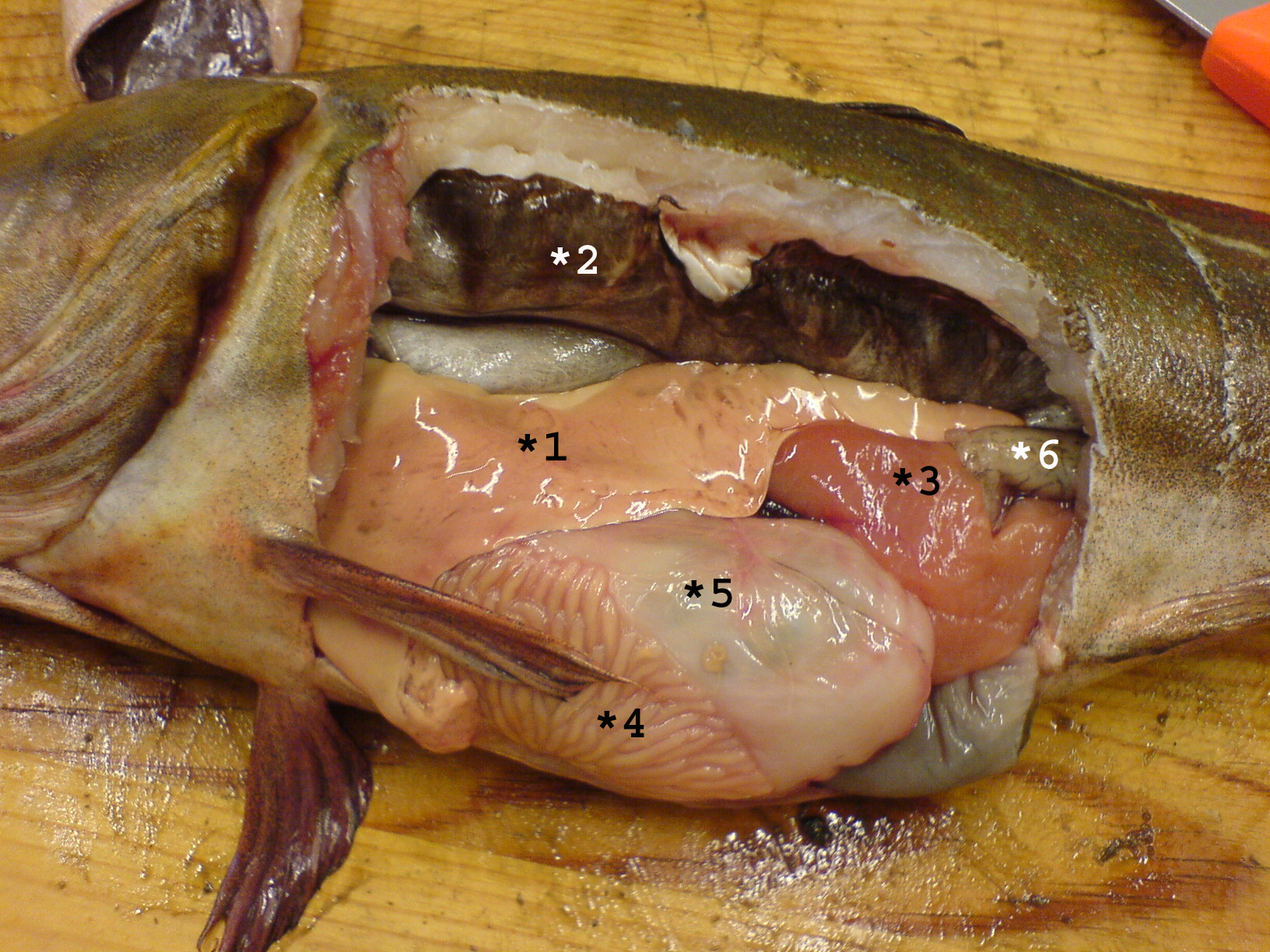
Internal organs of a female Atlantic cod: 1. liver, 2. gas bladder, 3. ovary, 4. pyloric caeca, 5. stomach, 6. intestine

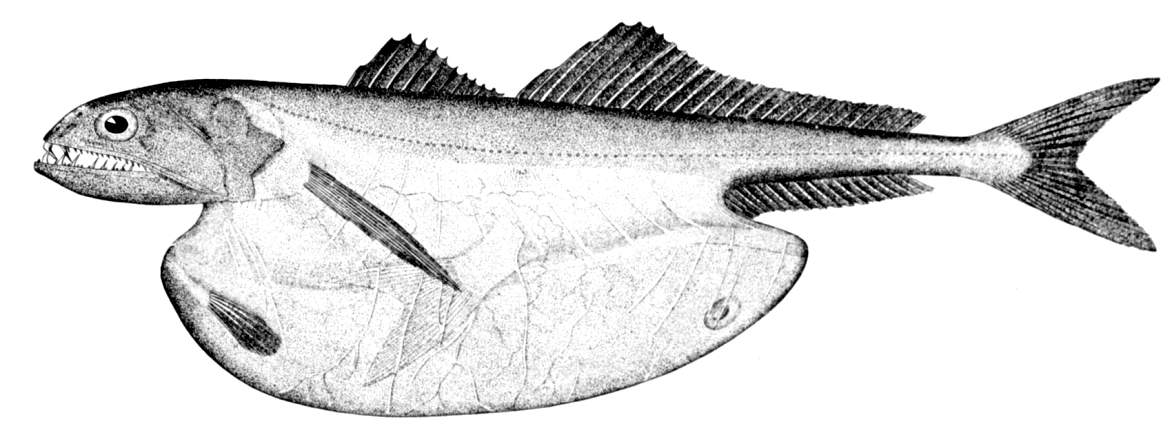
The black swallower is a species of deep sea fish with an extensible stomach which allows it to swallow fish larger than itself.

=== Intestines ===
As with other vertebrates, the intestines of fish consist of two segments, the small intestine and the large intestine. In most higher vertebrates, the small intestine is further divided into the duodenum and other parts. In fish, the divisions of the small intestine are not as clear, and the terms anterior intestine or proximal intestine may be used instead of duodenum. In bony fish, the intestine is relatively short, typically around one and a half times the length of the fish's body. It commonly has a number of pyloric caeca, small pouch-like structures along its length that help to increase the overall surface area of the organ for digesting food. There is no ileocaecal valve in teleosts, with the boundary between the small intestine and the rectum being marked only by the end of the digestive epithelium. There is no small intestine as such in non-teleost fish, such as sharks, sturgeons, and lungfish. Instead, the digestive part of the gut forms a spiral intestine, connecting the stomach to the rectum. In this type of gut, the intestine itself is relatively straight, but has a long fold running along the inner surface in a spiral fashion, sometimes for dozens of turns. This fold creates a valve-like structure that greatly increases both the surface area and the effective length of the intestine. The lining of the spiral intestine is similar to that of the small intestine in teleosts and non-mammalian tetrapods. In lampreys, the spiral valve is extremely small, possibly because their diet requires little digestion. Hagfish have no spiral valve at all, with digestion occurring for almost the entire length of the intestine, which is not subdivided into different regions.

=== Pyloric caeca ===
Many fish have a number of small outpocketings, called pyloric caeca, along their intestine. The purpose of the caeca is to increase the overall surface area of the intestines, thereby increasing the absorption of nutrients.

The number of pyloric caeca varies widely between species, and in some species of fish no caeca are present at all. Species with few or no caeca compensate for their lack by having longer intestines, or by have taller or more convoluted intestinal villi, thereby achieving similar levels of absorptive surface area.

Lungfish also have a pouch located at the beginning of their intestine, which is also called a pyloric caecum, but it has a different structure and function that the pyloric caeca of other fish species. The lungfish caecum is homologous (due to common descent) with the caecum present in most amniotes (tetrapod vertebrates that include all mammals, reptiles, and birds). In most herbivores the caecum receives partially digested food from the small intestine, and serves as a fermentation chamber to break down cellulose (such as grass or leaves) in the diet. In carnivores the caecum is often greatly reduced or missing.

=== Stomach ===
As with other vertebrates, the relative positions of the esophageal and duodenal openings to the stomach remain relatively constant. As a result, the stomach always curves somewhat to the left before curving back to meet the pyloric sphincter. However, lampreys, hagfishes, chimaeras, lungfishes, and some teleost fish have no stomach at all, with the esophagus opening directly into the intestine. These fish consume diets that either require little storage of food, no pre-digestion with gastric juices, or both.

=== Kidneys ===
The kidneys of fish are typically narrow, elongated organs, occupying a significant portion of the trunk. They are similar to the mesonephros of higher vertebrates (reptiles, birds, and mammals). The kidneys contain clusters of nephrons, serviced by collecting ducts which usually drain into a mesonephric duct. However, the situation is not always so simple. In cartilaginous fish, there is also a shorter duct which drains the posterior (metanephric) parts of the kidney, and joins with the mesonephric duct at the bladder or cloaca. Indeed, in many cartilaginous fish, the anterior portion of the kidney may degenerate or cease to function altogether in the adult. Hagfish and lamprey kidneys are unusually simple. They consist of a row of nephrons, each emptying directly into the mesonephric duct. Like the Nile tilapia, the kidney of some fish shows its three parts; head, trunk, and tail kidneys. Fish do not have a discrete adrenal gland with distinct cortex and medulla, similar to those found in mammals. The interrenal and chromaffin cells are located within the head kidney.

=== Urinary bladder ===
The gills of most teleost fish help to eliminate ammonia from the body, and fish live surrounded by water, but most still have a distinct bladder for storing waste fluid. The urinary bladder of teleosts is permeable to water, though this is less true for freshwater dwelling species than saltwater species. In freshwater fish, the bladder is a key site of absorption for many major ions; in marine fish, urine is held in the bladder for extended periods to maximise water absorption. The bladder of fish is called a tubal bladder since they are enlargements of the mesonephric duct. Most fish have a single (simplex) bladder, which collects urine from separate or merged ureters. In gars, the ureters are fused and form a bilobed bladder. In cod, there is a duplex bladder, which enter into a common route posteriorly. The urinary bladders of fish and tetrapods are thought to be analogous while the former's swim-bladders and latter's lungs are considered homologous.

Most fish also have an organ called a swim-bladder which is unrelated to the urinary bladder except in its membranous nature. The loaches, pilchards, and herrings are among the few types of fish in which a urinary bladder is poorly developed. It is largest in those fish which lack an air bladder, and is situated in front of the oviducts and behind the rectum.

=== Spleen ===
The spleen is found in nearly all vertebrates. It is a non-vital organ, similar in structure to a large lymph node. It acts primarily as a blood filter, and plays important roles in regards to red blood cells and the immune system. In cartilaginous and bony fish it consists primarily of red pulp and is normally a somewhat elongated organ as it actually lies inside the serosal lining of the intestine. The only vertebrates lacking a spleen are the lampreys and hagfishes. Even in these animals, there is a diffuse layer of haematopoietic tissue within the gut wall, which has a similar structure to red pulp, and is presumed to be homologous to the spleen of higher vertebrates.

=== Liver ===
The liver is a large vital organ present in all fish. It has a wide range of functions, including detoxification, protein synthesis, and production of biochemicals necessary for digestion. It is very susceptible to contamination by organic and inorganic compounds because they can accumulate over time and cause potentially life-threatening conditions. Because of the liver's capacity for detoxification and storage of harmful components, it is often used as an environmental biomarker.

=== Heart ===
Blood flow through the heart: sinus venosus, atrium, ventricle, and outflow tract

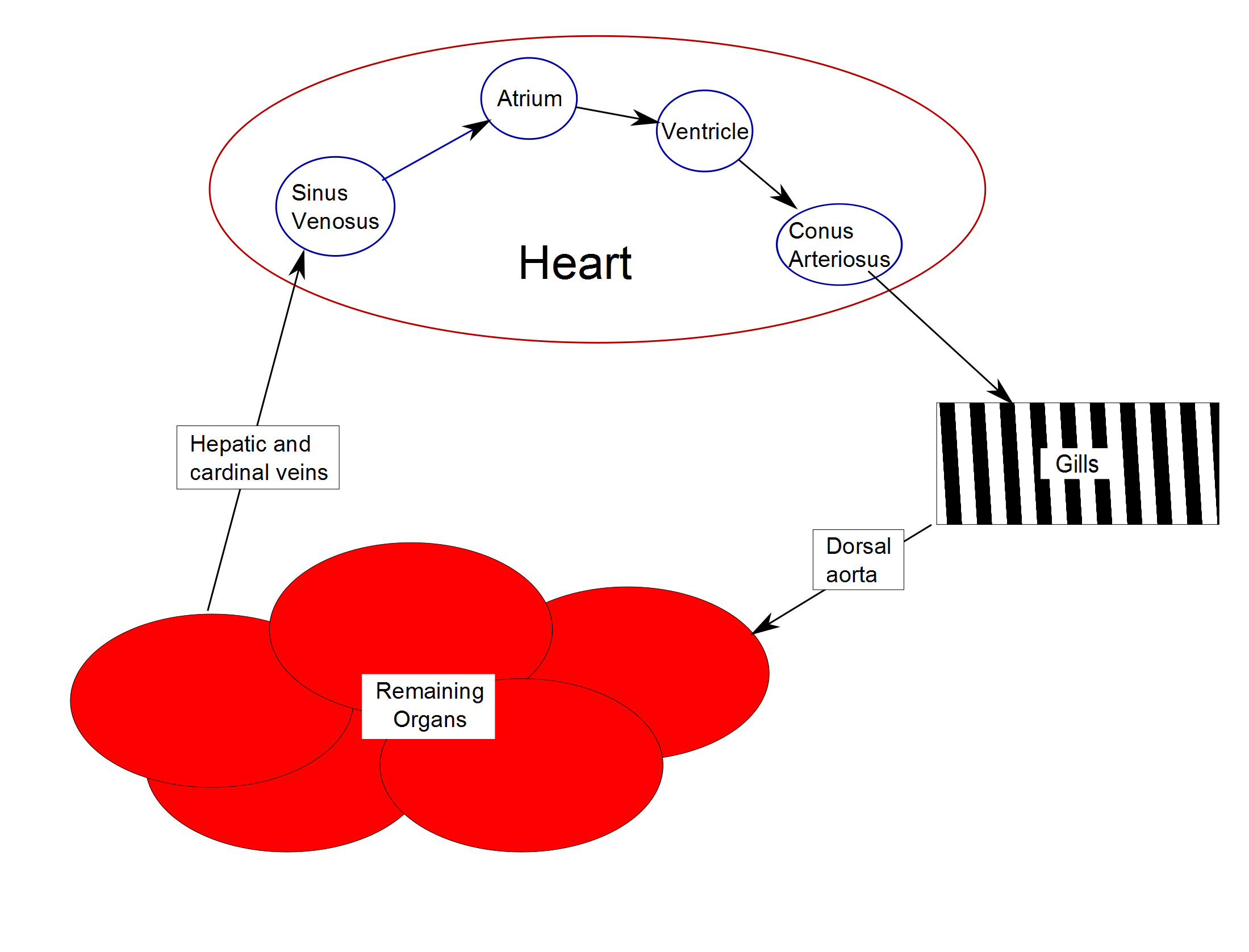
Cardiovascular cycle in a fish

Fish have what is often described as a two-chambered heart, consisting of one atrium to receive blood and one ventricle to pump it, in contrast to three chambers (two atria, one ventricle) of amphibian and most reptile hearts and four chambers (two atria, two ventricles) of mammal and bird hearts. However, the fish heart has entry and exit compartments that may be called chambers, so it is also sometimes described as three-chambered, or four-chambered, depending on what is counted as a chamber. The atrium and ventricle are sometimes considered "true chambers", while the others are considered "accessory chambers". In similarity to humans, fish have a closed circulatory system where the blood is contained in a circuit of blood vessels, and the blood never leaves these vessels. Deoxygenated blood is carried from the veins to the heart from different parts of the body. The blood from the heart is then pumped to the gills to be oxygenated, and is then circulated through the rest of the body.

The four compartments are arranged sequentially:

1. Sinus venosus: A thin-walled sac or reservoir with some cardiac muscle that collects deoxygenated blood through the incoming hepatic and cardinal veins.
2. Atrium: A thicker-walled, muscular chamber that sends blood to the ventricle.
3. Ventricle: A thick-walled, muscular chamber that pumps the blood to the fourth part, the outflow tract. The shape of the ventricle varies considerably, usually tubular in fish with elongated bodies, pyramidal with a triangular base in others, or sometimes sac-like in some marine fish.
4. Outflow tract (OFT): Goes to the ventral aorta and consists of the tubular conus arteriosus, bulbus arteriosus, or both. The conus arteriosus, typically found in more primitive species of fish, contracts to assist blood flow to the aorta, while the bulbus anteriosus does not.

Ostial valves, consisting of flap-like connective tissues, prevent blood from flowing backward through the compartments. The ostial valve between the sinus venosus and atrium is called the sino-atrial valve, which closes during ventricular contraction. Between the atrium and ventricle is an ostial valve called the atrioventricular valve, and between the bulbus arteriosus and ventricle is an ostial valve called the bulbo-ventricular valve. The conus arteriosus has a variable number of semilunar valves.

The ventral aorta delivers blood to the gills where it is oxygenated and flows, through the dorsal aorta, into the rest of the body. (In tetrapods, the ventral aorta is divided in two; one half forms the ascending aorta, while the other forms the pulmonary artery).

The circulatory systems of all vertebrates are closed. Fish have the simplest circulatory system, consisting of only one circuit, with the blood being pumped through the capillaries of the gills and on to the capillaries of the body tissues. This is known as single cycle circulation.

In the adult fish, the four compartments are not arranged in a straight row, instead forming an S-shape with the latter two compartments lying above the former two. This relatively simpler pattern is found in cartilaginous fish and in the ray-finned fish. In teleosts, the conus arteriosus is very small and can more accurately be described as part of the aorta rather than of the heart proper. The conus arteriosus is not present in any amniotes, presumably having been absorbed into the ventricles over the course of evolution. Similarly, while the sinus venosus is present as a vestigial structure in some reptiles and birds, it is otherwise absorbed into the right atrium and is no longer distinguishable.

=== Swim bladder ===
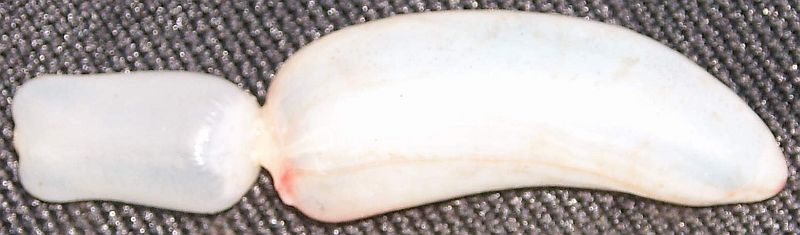
The swim bladder of a rudd

The swim bladder is an internal gas-filled organ in many bony fishes used to control buoyancy by its expansion or contraction. This allows the fish to stay at a desired water depth without having to maintain its vertical position by generating lift via swimming, a mechanism that expends more energy. Due to its dorsal position, the expansion of the bladder moves the center of mass of the fish downwards, thus contributing to its stabilization. Additionally, the swim bladder functions as a resonance chamber to produce or receive sound.

The gas/tissue interface at the swim bladder produces a strong reflection of sound, which is used by sonar equipment to find fish.

Cartilaginous fish such as sharks and rays do not have swim bladders. For that reason, most cartilaginous fish can only control depth by actively swimming, which produces dynamic lift.

=== Weberian apparatus ===
Fishes of the superorder Ostariophysi possess a structure called the Weberian apparatus, a modification which allows them to hear better. This ability may explain the marked success of ostariophysian fishes. The apparatus is made up of a set of bones known as Weberian ossicles, a chain of small bones that connect the auditory system to the swim bladder of fishes. The ossicles connect the gas bladder wall with Y-shaped lymph sinus that is next to the lymph-filled transverse canal joining the saccules of the right and left ears. This allows the transmission of vibrations to the inner ear. A fully functioning Weberian apparatus consists of the swim bladder, the Weberian ossicles, a portion of the anterior vertebral column, and some muscles and ligaments.

== Reproductive organs ==
Testicles or ovaries (7)

Fish reproductive organs include testicles and ovaries. In most species, gonads are paired organs of similar size, which can be partially or totally fused. There may also be a range of secondary organs that increase reproductive fitness. The genital papilla is a small, fleshy tube behind the anus in teleost fishes from which the sperm or eggs are released; the sex of a fish often can be determined by the shape of its papilla. Sex determination in fish, which is dependent on intrinsic genetic factors, is followed by sex differentiation through gene expression of feedback mechanisms that ensure the stability of the levels of particular hormones and cellular profile. However, the hermaphroditic species are an exception in which they are able to alter the course of sex differentiation in order to maximize their fitness. There are various determination mechanisms for gonadal sex in fish and processes that aid development of the gonadal function. Gonadal sex is influenced by a number of factors, including cell-autonomous genetic mechanisms, endocrine, paracrine, behavioral, or environmental signals. This results in the primordial germ cells (PGCs) to be able to interpret internal or external stimuli to develop into spermatogonia or oogonia. Spermatogenesis in testes is a process in which spermatogonia differentiates into spermatocytes through mitosis and meiosis, which halves the number of chromosomes, creating haploid spermatids. During spermiogenesis, the last stage of spermatogenesis, the haploid spermatids develop into spermatozoa. In the ovaries, oogonia also undergo mitosis and meiosis during oogenesis, and this gives rise to primary oocytes and then eventually the ovum. The primary oocyte divides and produces the secondary oocyte as well as a polar body, before the secondary oocyte develops into the haploid ootid.

1) Sagittal view of the anus and urogenital opening. 2) Ventral view of the anus and urogenital opening.

=== Testes ===
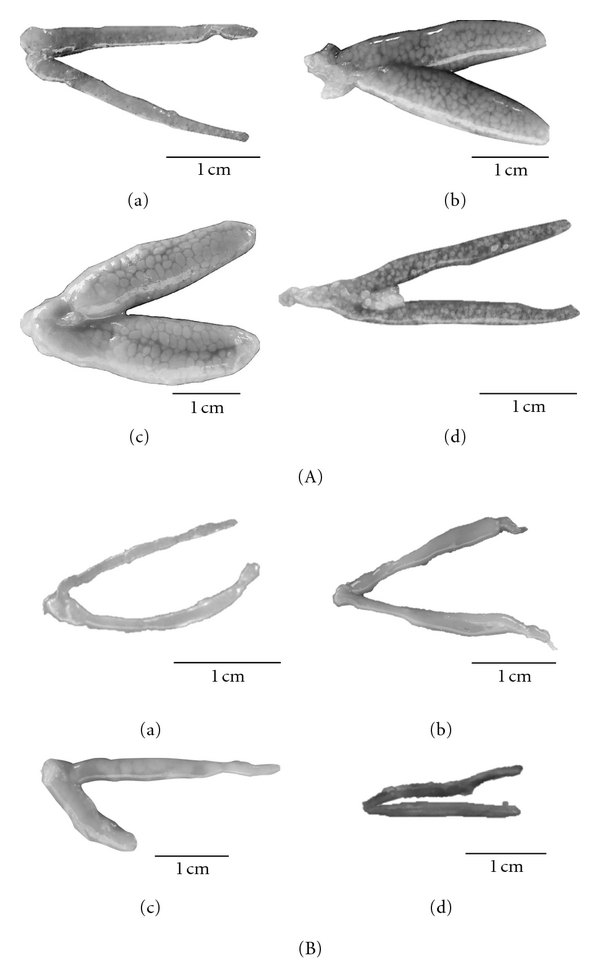
Maturity stages of (A) ovaries and (B) testicles of the cichlid Crenicichla menezesi: (a) immature; (b) maturing; (c) mature; (d) partially spent

Most male fish have two testes of similar size. In the case of sharks, the testis on the right side is usually larger. The primitive jawless fish have only a single testis located in the midline of the body, although even this forms from the fusion of paired structures in the embryo.

Under a tough membranous shell, the tunica albuginea, the testis of some teleost fish, contains very fine coiled tubes called seminiferous tubules. The tubules are lined with a layer of cells (germ cells) that from puberty into old age, develop into sperm cells (also known as spermatozoa or male gametes). The developing sperm travel through the seminiferous tubules to the rete testis located in the mediastinum testis, to the efferent ducts, and then to the epididymides (depending on the species) where newly created sperm cells mature (see spermatogenesis). The sperm move into the vasa deferentia, and are eventually expelled through the urethra and out of the urethral orifice through muscular contractions.

However, most fish do not possess seminiferous tubules. Instead, the sperm are produced in spherical structures called sperm ampullae. These are seasonal structures, releasing their contents during the breeding season and then being reabsorbed by the body. Before the next breeding season, new sperm ampullae begin to form and ripen. The ampullae are otherwise essentially identical to the seminiferous tubules in higher vertebrates, including the same range of cell types.

In terms of spermatogonia distribution, the structure of teleost testes have two types: in the most common, spermatogonia occur all along the seminiferous tubules, while in Atherinomorpha, they are confined to the distal portion of these structures. Fish can present cystic or semi-cystic spermatogenesis in relation to the release phase of germ cells in cysts to the lumen of the seminiferous tubules.

=== Ovaries ===
Many of the features found in ovaries are common to all vertebrates, including the presence of follicular cells and tunica albuginea There may be hundreds or even millions of fertile eggs present in the ovary of a fish at any given time. Fresh eggs may be developing from the germinal epithelium throughout life. Corpora lutea are found only in mammals, and in some elasmobranch fish; in other species, the remnants of the follicle are quickly resorbed by the ovary. The ovary of teleosts often contains a hollow, lymph-filled space which opens into the oviduct, and into which the eggs are shed. Most normal female fish have two ovaries. In some elasmobranchs, only the right ovary develops fully. In the primitive jawless fish and some teleosts, there is only one ovary, formed by the fusion of the paired organs in the embryo.

Fish ovaries may be of three types: gymnovarian, secondary gymnovarian or cystovarian. In the first type, the oocytes are released directly into the coelomic cavity and then enter the ostium, then through the oviduct and are eliminated. Secondary gymnovarian ovaries shed ova into the coelom from which they go directly into the oviduct. In the third type, the oocytes are conveyed to the exterior through the oviduct. Gymnovaries are the primitive condition found in lungfish, sturgeon, and bowfin. Cystovaries characterize most teleosts, where the ovary lumen has continuity with the oviduct. Secondary gymnovaries are found in salmonids and a few other teleosts.

== Nervous system ==
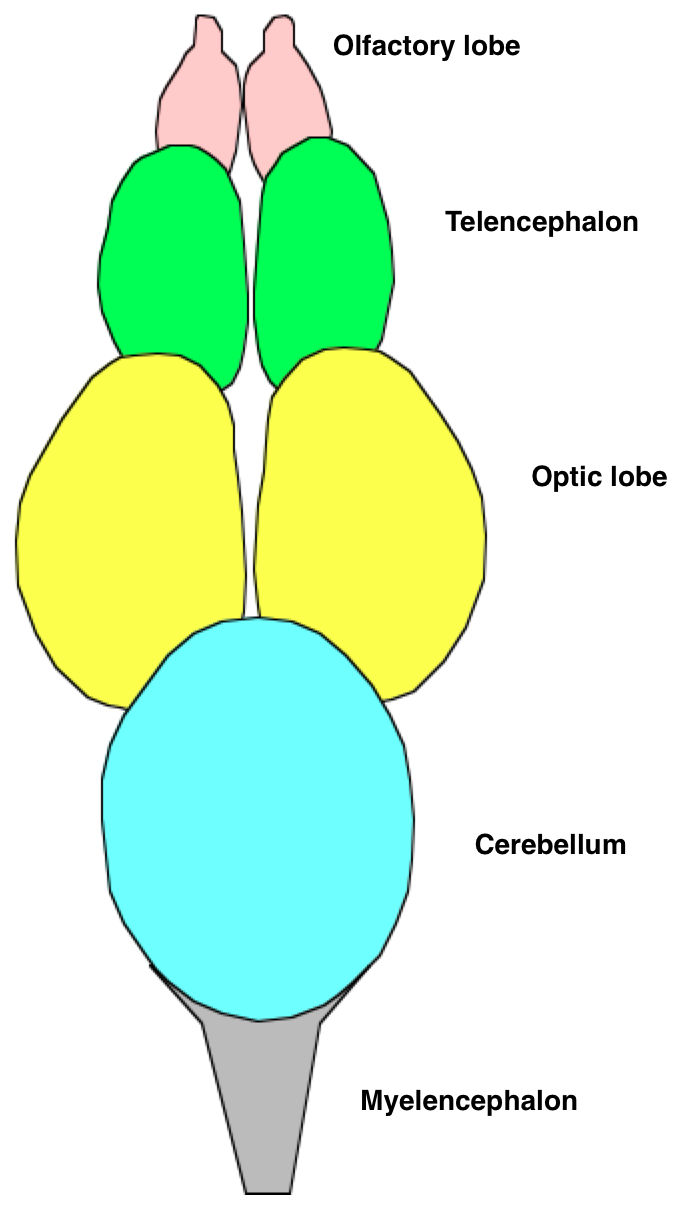
Dorsal view of the brain of the rainbow trout

=== Central nervous system ===
Fish typically have quite small brains relative to body size compared with other vertebrates, typically one-fifteenth the brain mass of a similarly sized bird or mammal. However, some fish have relatively large brains, most notably mormyrids and sharks, which have brains about as massive relative to body weight as birds and marsupials.

Fish brains are divided into several regions. At the front are the olfactory lobes, a pair of structures that receive and process signals from the nostrils via the two olfactory nerves. Similar to the way humans smell chemicals in the air, fish smell chemicals in the water by tasting them. The olfactory lobes are very large in fish that hunt primarily by smell, such as hagfish, sharks, and catfish. Behind the olfactory lobes is the two-lobed telencephalon, the structural equivalent to the cerebrum in higher vertebrates. In fish the telencephalon is concerned mostly with olfaction. Together these structures form the forebrain.

The forebrain is connected to the midbrain via the diencephalon (in the diagram, this structure is below the optic lobes and consequently not visible). The diencephalon performs functions associated with hormones and homeostasis. The pineal body lies just above the diencephalon. This structure detects light, maintains circadian rhythms, and controls colour changes. The midbrain or mesencephalon contains the two optic lobes. These are very large in species that hunt by sight, such as rainbow trout and cichlids.

The hindbrain or metencephalon is particularly involved in swimming and balance. The cerebellum is a single-lobed structure that is typically the biggest part of the brain. Hagfish and lampreys have relatively small cerebella, while the mormyrid cerebellum is massive and apparently involved in their electrical sense.

The brain stem or myelencephalon is the brain's posterior. As well as controlling some muscles and body organs, in bony fish at least, the brain stem governs respiration and osmoregulation.

Vertebrates are the only chordate group to exhibit a proper brain. A slight swelling of the anterior end of the dorsal nerve cord is found in the lancelet, though it lacks the eyes and other complex sense organs comparable to those of vertebrates. Other chordates do not show any trends towards cephalisation. The central nervous system is based on a hollow nerve tube running along the length of the animal, from which the peripheral nervous system branches out to innervate the various systems. The front end of the nerve tube is expanded by a thickening of the walls and expansion of the central canal of spinal cord into three primary brain vesicles; the prosencephalon (forebrain), mesencephalon (midbrain) and rhombencephalon (hindbrain) then further differentiated in the various vertebrate groups. Two laterally placed eyes form around outgrows from the midbrain, except in hagfish, though this may be a secondary loss. The forebrain is well developed and subdivided in most tetrapods, while the midbrain dominates in many fish and some salamanders. Vesicles of the forebrain are usually paired, giving rise to hemispheres like the cerebral hemispheres in mammals. The resulting anatomy of the central nervous system, with a single, hollow ventral nerve cord topped by a series of (often paired) vesicles is unique to vertebrates.

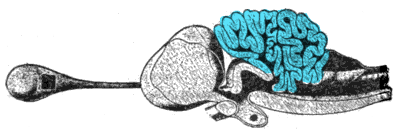
Cross-section of the brain of a porbeagle shark with the cerebellum highlighted

=== Cerebellum ===
The circuits in the cerebellum are similar across all classes of vertebrates, including fish, reptiles, birds, and mammals. There is also an analogous brain structure in cephalopods with well-developed brains, such as octopuses. This has been taken as evidence that the cerebellum performs functions important to all animal species with a brain.

There is considerable variation in the size and shape of the cerebellum in different vertebrate species. In amphibians, lampreys, and hagfish, the cerebellum is little developed; in the latter two groups, it is barely distinguishable from the brain-stem. Although the spinocerebellum is present in these groups, the primary structures are small paired nuclei corresponding to the vestibulocerebellum.

The cerebellum of cartilaginous and bony fishes is extraordinarily large and complex. In at least one important respect, it differs in internal structure from the mammalian cerebellum: The fish cerebellum does not contain discrete deep cerebellar nuclei. Instead, the primary targets of Purkinje cells are a distinct type of cell distributed across the cerebellar cortex, a type not seen in mammals. In mormyrids (a family of weakly electrosensitive freshwater fish), the cerebellum is considerably larger than the rest of the brain put together. The largest part of it is a special structure called the valvula, which has an unusually regular architecture and receives much of its input from the electrosensory system.

Most species of fish and amphibians possess a lateral line system that senses pressure waves in water. One of the brain areas that receives primary input from the lateral line organ, the medial octavolateral nucleus, has a cerebellum-like structure, with granule cells and parallel fibers. In electrosensitive fish, the input from the electrosensory system goes to the dorsal octavolateral nucleus, which also has a cerebellum-like structure. In ray-finned fishes (by far the largest group), the optic tectum has a layer—the marginal layer—that is cerebellum-like.

=== Identified neurons ===
A neuron is "identified" if it has properties that distinguish it from every other neuron in the same animal—properties such as location, neurotransmitter, gene expression pattern, and connectivity—and if every individual organism belonging to the same species has one and only one neuron with the same set of properties. In vertebrate nervous systems, very few neurons are "identified" in this sense (in humans, there are believed to be none). In simpler nervous systems, some or all neurons may be thus unique.

In vertebrates, the best known identified neurons are the gigantic Mauthner cells of fish. Every fish has two Mauthner cells, located in the bottom part of the brainstem, one on the left side and one on the right. Each Mauthner cell has an axon that crosses over, innervating neurons at the same brain level and then travelling down through the spinal cord, making numerous connections as it goes. The synapses generated by a Mauthner cell are so powerful that a single action potential gives rise to a major behavioral response: within milliseconds the fish curves its body into a C-shape, then straightens, thereby propelling itself rapidly forward. Functionally, this is a fast escape response, triggered most easily by a strong sound wave or pressure wave impinging on the lateral line organ of the fish. Mauthner cells are not the only identified neurons in fish—there are about 20 more types, including pairs of "Mauthner cell analogs" in each spinal segmental nucleus. Although a Mauthner cell is capable of bringing about an escape response all by itself, in the context of ordinary behavior, other types of cells usually contribute to shaping the amplitude and direction of the response.

Mauthner cells have been described as command neurons. A command neuron is a special type of identified neuron, defined as a neuron that is capable of driving a specific behavior all by itself. Such neurons appear most commonly in the fast escape systems of various species—the squid giant axon and squid giant synapse, used for pioneering experiments in neurophysiology because of their enormous size, both participate in the fast escape circuit of the squid. The concept of a command neuron has, however, become controversial, because of studies showing that some neurons that initially appeared to fit the description were really only capable of evoking a response in a limited set of circumstances.

== Immune system ==
Immune organs vary by type of fish. In the jawless fish (lampreys and hagfish), true lymphoid organs are absent. These fish rely on regions of lymphoid tissue within other organs to produce immune cells. For example, erythrocytes, macrophages and plasma cells are produced in the anterior kidney (or pronephros) and some areas of the gut (where granulocytes mature). They resemble primitive bone marrow in hagfish.

Cartilaginous fish (sharks and rays) have a more advanced immune system. They have three specialized organs that are unique to chondrichthyes; the epigonal organs (lymphoid tissues similar to mammalian bone) that surround the gonads, the Leydig's organ within the walls of their esophagus, and a spiral valve in their intestine. These organs house typical immune cells (granulocytes, lymphocytes and plasma cells). They also possess an identifiable thymus and a well-developed spleen (their most important immune organ) where various lymphocytes, plasma cells and macrophages develop and are stored.

Chondrostean fish (sturgeons, paddlefish and bichirs) possess a major site for the production of granulocytes within a mass that is associated with the meninges, the membranes surrounding the central nervous system. Their heart is frequently covered with tissue that contains lymphocytes, reticular cells and a small number of macrophages. The chondrostean kidney is an important hemopoietic organ; it is where erythrocytes, granulocytes, lymphocytes and macrophages develop.

Like chondrostean fish, the major immune tissues of bony fish (teleostei) include the kidney (especially the anterior kidney), which houses many different immune cells. In addition, teleost fish possess a thymus, spleen and scattered immune areas within mucosal tissues (e.g. in the skin, gills, gut and gonads). Much like the mammalian immune system, teleost erythrocytes, neutrophils and granulocytes are believed to reside in the spleen whereas lymphocytes are the major cell type found in the thymus. In 2006, a lymphatic system similar to that in mammals was described in one species of teleost fish, the zebrafish. Although not confirmed as yet, this system presumably will be where unstimulated naive T cells accumulate while waiting to encounter an antigen.

== See also ==
- Anatomical terms of location
- Decapod anatomy
- Digital Fish Library
- Evolution of fish
- Fish development
- Fish measurement
- Fish physiology
- Gastropod anatomy
- Ichthyology terms
- Panderichthys digits
- Shark anatomy
