= Jacques Pellegrin =

French zoologist (1873–1944)

- Born: 12 June 1873; Paris, France
- Died: 12 August 1944 (aged 71); Paris, France
- Scientific career
- Fields: Herpetology; Ichthyology; Zoology
- Workplaces: Muséum national d'histoire naturelle

Jacques Pellegrin (12 June 1873 – 12 August 1944) was a French zoologist.

== Biography ==
Pellegrin was born in Paris on 12 June 1873. He worked under zoologist Léon Vaillant (chair of reptiles and fishes) at the Muséum national d'histoire naturelle. From 1897, Pellegrin served as préparateur at the museum. He obtained doctorates in medicine (1899) and science (1904), and in 1908 was named as an assistant director.

After many missions abroad, he became sub-director of the museum in 1937, and replaced Louis Roule (1861–1942) as the chairperson of herpetology and ichthyology.

He published over 600 scientific books and articles and scientifically described around 350 new species. He named a number of fishes from the family Cichlidae, such as the genera Astatoreochromis, Astatotilapia, Boulengerochromis, Lepidiolamprologus, Nanochromis and Ophthalmotilapia.

Pellegrin fought with the French Resistance during World War II. He was killed by a Wehrmacht soldier using a MG 42 while in his hiding spot.

== Taxa described by him ==
- See Category:Taxa named by Jacques Pellegrin

== Taxa named in his honor ==
He has the following species named in his honor:

- The Clingfish Apletodon pellegrini
- Enteromius pellegrini (Pellegrin's barb)
- The Pike Cichlid Crenicichla pellegrini Ploeg, 1991
- The Yellow hump eartheater cichlid Geophagus pellegrini Regan, 1912
- Nemacheilus pellegrini
- Petrocephalus pellegrini, is a species of electric fish in the family Mormyridae, found the coastal basins between Sierra Leone and Côte d'Ivoire, part of the Sassandra River.
- Luciosoma pellegrinii Popta, 1905

== Selected writings ==
- Contribution à l'étude anatomique, biologique et taxinomique des poissons de la famille des cichlidés, 1903 – Contribution to the anatomical, biological and taxonomic study of fish of the family Cichlidae.
- Les Poissons du bassin du Tchad, 1912 – Fish of the Lake Chad basin.
- Les poissons des eaux douces de l'Afrique du Nord Française : Maroc, Algérie, Tunisie, Sahara, 1921 – Freshwater fish of French North Africa; Morocco, Algeria, Tunisia and the Sahara.
- Les poissons des eaux douces de l'Afrique occidentale : du Sénégal au Niger, 1923 – Freshwater fish of western Africa; Senegal and Niger.
- Poissons du Chiloango et du Congo, 1928 – Fish from the Chiloango and the Congo.
- Les poissons des eaux douces d'Asie-Mineure, 1928 – Freshwater fish of Asia Minor
- Les poissons des eaux douces de Madagascar et des îles voisines (Comores, Seychelles, Mascareignes), 1933 – Freshwater fish of Madagascar and neighboring islands (Comoros, Seychelles, Mascarenes).

== See also ==
- List of chairs of the National Museum of Natural History, France

== Sources ==
- This article incorporates text from the German Wikipedia; sources listed as "Staatsbibliothek zu Berlin" & "Bayerische Staatsbibliothek München".
