= Crenicichla cyclostoma =

Scientific classification
- Domain: Eukaryota
- Kingdom: Animalia
- Phylum: Chordata
- Class: Actinopterygii
- Order: Cichliformes
- Family: Cichlidae
- Genus: Crenicichla
- Species: C. cyclostoma

Binomial name
- Crenicichla cyclostoma Ploeg, 1986

Species of fish

Crenicichla cyclostoma is a species of cichlid native to South America. It is found in the Amazon River basin and in the lower Tocantins River basin. This species reaches a length of 9.6 cm (3.8 in).
