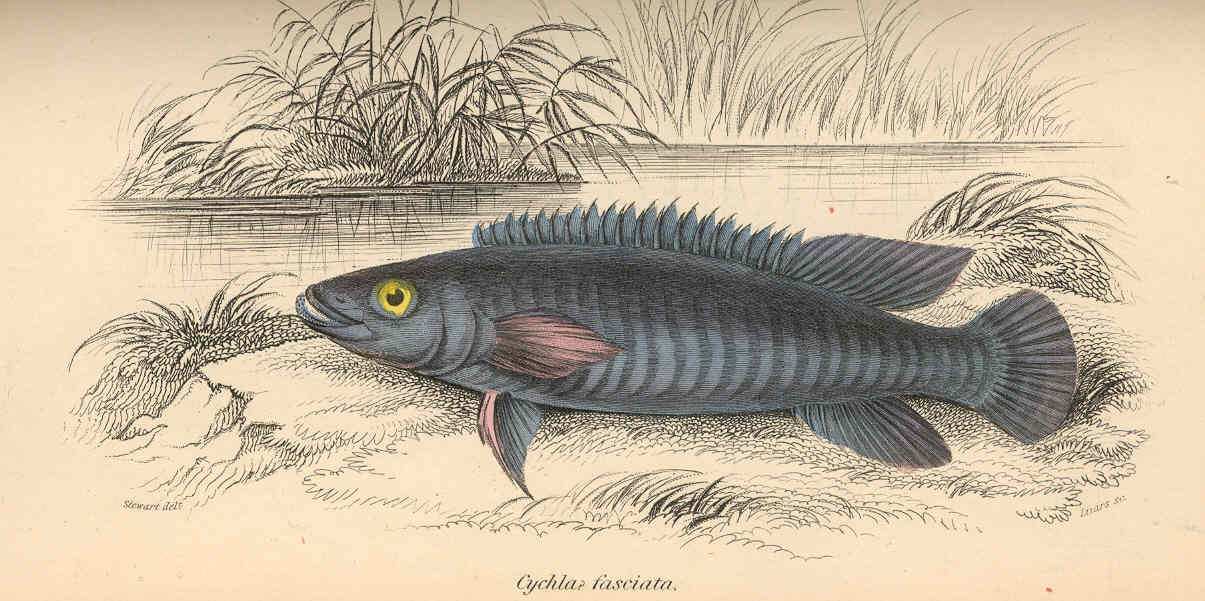

Conservation status
- Data Deficient (IUCN 3.1)

Scientific classification
- Kingdom: Animalia
- Phylum: Chordata
- Class: Actinopterygii
- Order: Cichliformes
- Family: Cichlidae
- Genus: Saxatilia
- Species: S. sipaliwini

Binomial name
- Saxatilia sipaliwini (Ploeg, 1987)

Synonyms
- Crenicichla sipaliwini

= Saxatilia sipaliwini =

Species of fish

Saxatilia sipaliwini is a species of cichlid native to South America. It is found in the Sipaliwini River, in its upper Corantijn drainage in Suriname. This species reaches a length of 17.3 cm (6.8 in).
