= Crenicichla stocki =

Scientific classification
- Kingdom: Animalia
- Phylum: Chordata
- Class: Actinopterygii
- Order: Cichliformes
- Family: Cichlidae
- Genus: Crenicichla
- Species: C. stocki

Binomial name
- Crenicichla stocki Ploeg, 1991

Species of fish

Crenicichla stocki is a species of cichlid native to South America. It is found in the Amazon River basin and in the Tocantins River basin. This species reaches a length of 25 cm (9.8 in).

The fish is named in honor of Ploeg's promoter (Ph.D. supervisor) Jan H. Stock (1931–1997), a carcinologist with the Zoological Museum in Amsterdam, on the occasion of Stock's retirement in October 1990.
