= Pellegrin's barb =

Conservation status
- Least Concern (IUCN 3.1)

Scientific classification
- Kingdom: Animalia
- Phylum: Chordata
- Class: Actinopterygii
- Order: Cypriniformes
- Family: Cyprinidae
- Subfamily: Smiliogastrinae
- Genus: Enteromius
- Species: E. pellegrini

Binomial name
- Enteromius pellegrini Poll, 1939

Synonyms
- Barbus pellegrini Barbus serrifer trimaculata

Species of fish

The Pellegrin's barb (Enteromius pellegrini) is a species of cyprinid fish.

It is found in Burundi, Rwanda, Tanzania, and Uganda. Its natural habitat is rivers. It is not considered a threatened species by the IUCN.

The scientific name honours of French zoologist Jacques Pellegrin (1873–1944).
