= Saxatilia inpa =

Conservation status
- Least Concern (IUCN 3.1)

Scientific classification
- Kingdom: Animalia
- Phylum: Chordata
- Class: Actinopterygii
- Order: Cichliformes
- Family: Cichlidae
- Genus: Saxatilia
- Species: S. inpa

Binomial name
- Saxatilia inpa Ploeg, 1991

Synonyms
- Crenicichla inpa

Species of fish

Saxatilia inpa is a species of cichlid native to South America. It is found in the Amazon River basin, and reported from a large area of the Amazon River basin in Brazil. This species reaches a length of 16.8 cm (6.6 in).

The specific name alludes to the National Institute of Amazonian Research (INPA), who supplied Ploeg with an "enormous amount of material" which partially served as the basis for his revision of the genus.
