= Saxatilia pellegrini =

Conservation status
- Least Concern (IUCN 3.1)

Scientific classification
- Kingdom: Animalia
- Phylum: Chordata
- Class: Actinopterygii
- Order: Cichliformes
- Family: Cichlidae
- Genus: Saxatilia
- Species: S. pellegrini

Binomial name
- Saxatilia pellegrini Ploeg, 1991

Synonyms
- Crenicichla pellegrini

Species of fish

Saxatilia pellegrini is a species of cichlid native to South America. It is found in the Amazon River basin and in the Aripuanã River basin. This species reaches a length of 15.7 cm (6.2 in).

The fish is named in honor of French ichthyologist Jacques Pellegrin (1873-1944), as a tribute to his contribution to the knowledge of the genus Crenicichla and the cichlids in general.
