= Crenicichla jegui =

Scientific classification
- Domain: Eukaryota
- Kingdom: Animalia
- Phylum: Chordata
- Class: Actinopterygii
- Order: Cichliformes
- Family: Cichlidae
- Genus: Crenicichla
- Species: C. jegui

Binomial name
- Crenicichla jegui Ploeg, 1986

Species of fish

Crenicichla jegui is a species of cichlid native to South America. It is found in the Amazon River basin and in the lower Tocantins River basin. This species reaches a length of 20 cm (7.9 in).

The fish is named in honor of ichthyologist Michael Jégu from ORSTOM (Office de la Recherche Scientifique et Technique d’Outre-Mer), who collected the paratypes and most of the other specimens on which Ploeg’s paper is based upon.
