= Saxatilia ploegi =

Scientific classification
- Kingdom: Animalia
- Phylum: Chordata
- Class: Actinopterygii
- Order: Cichliformes
- Family: Cichlidae
- Genus: Saxatilia
- Species: S. ploegi

Binomial name
- Saxatilia ploegi H. R. Varella, Loeb, F. C. T. Lima & S. O. Kullander, 2018

Synonyms
- Crenicichla ploegi

Species of fish

Saxatilia ploegi is a species of cichlid native to South America. It is found swimming in Brazil. This species reaches a length of 28 cm (11 in).

== Etymology ==
The fish is named in honor of Dutch ichthyologist Alex Ploeg, whose Ph.D. thesis dealt with the taxonomic revision, biogeography and phylogeny of Crenicichla, and who published papers on the systematics of the genus from 1986 to 1991, describing a total of 23 species, eighteen of which are still considered valid; afterwards, he worked as interlocutor between the ornamental fish industry and other institutions worldwide, before losing his life, along with his wife and son and son’s friend, when Malaysia Airlines flight MH17 was shot down by a missile over Ukraine on 17 July 2014.
