= Saxatilia santosi =

Scientific classification
- Domain: Eukaryota
- Kingdom: Animalia
- Phylum: Chordata
- Class: Actinopterygii
- Order: Cichliformes
- Family: Cichlidae
- Genus: Saxatilia
- Species: S. santosi

Binomial name
- Saxatilia santosi Ploeg, 1991

Synonyms
- Crenicichla santosi

Species of fish

Saxatilia santosi is a species of cichlid native to South America. It is found in the Amazon River basin and in the Machado River of Rondônia, Brazil. This species reaches a length of 12 cm (4.7 in).

The fish is named in honor of Ploeg’s friend Geraldo Mendes dos Santos of the Instituto Nacional de Pesquisas da Amazônia, who collected this cichlid during a survey of Rondônian rivers that took place between 1984 and 1988.
