= Saxatilia nickeriensis =

Conservation status
- Least Concern (IUCN 3.1)

Scientific classification
- Kingdom: Animalia
- Phylum: Chordata
- Class: Actinopterygii
- Order: Cichliformes
- Family: Cichlidae
- Genus: Saxatilia
- Species: S. nickeriensis

Binomial name
- Saxatilia nickeriensis Ploeg, 1987

Synonyms
- Crenicichla nickeriensis

Species of fish

Saxatilia nickeriensis is a species of cichlid native to South America. It is found in the Nickerie and Corantijn River basins in Suriname. This species reaches a length of 19.1 cm (7.5 in).
