= Saxatilia isbrueckeri =

Conservation status
- Least Concern (IUCN 3.1)

Scientific classification
- Kingdom: Animalia
- Phylum: Chordata
- Class: Actinopterygii
- Order: Cichliformes
- Family: Cichlidae
- Genus: Saxatilia
- Species: S. isbrueckeri

Binomial name
- Saxatilia isbrueckeri (Ploeg, 1991)

Synonyms
- Crenicichla isbrueckeri Ploeg, 1991

Species of fish

Saxatilia isbrueckeri is a species of cichlid native to South America. It is found in the Amazon River basin and in the Aripuanã River basin, and may reach a length of 9.5 cm (3.7 in) in SL. It is named in honor of the Dutch ichthyologist Isaäc J. H. Isbrücker.
