= Saxatilia pydanielae =

Conservation status
- Data Deficient (IUCN 3.1)

Scientific classification
- Kingdom: Animalia
- Phylum: Chordata
- Class: Actinopterygii
- Order: Cichliformes
- Family: Cichlidae
- Genus: Saxatilia
- Species: S. pydanielae

Binomial name
- Saxatilia pydanielae Ploeg, 1991

Synonyms
- Crenicichla pydanielae

Species of fish

Saxatilia pydanielae is a species of cichlid native to South America. It is found in the Amazon River basin and in the Trombetas River drainage above Cachoeira Porteira, Brazil. This species reaches a length of 17.8 cm (7.0 in).

The fish is named in honor of Lúcia H. Rapp Py-Daniel, the Curator of Fishes at the Instituto Nacional de Pesquisas da Amazônia, for her hospitality when Ploeg visited Manaus in November 1987 and July 1989.
