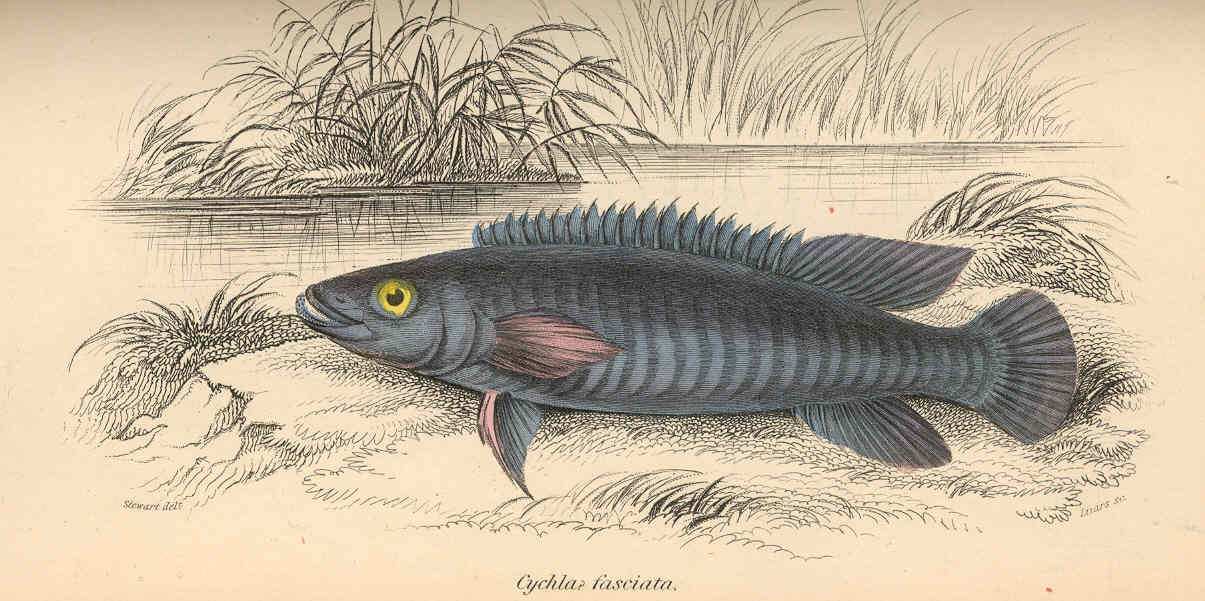

Conservation status
- Least Concern (IUCN 3.1)

Scientific classification
- Kingdom: Animalia
- Phylum: Chordata
- Class: Actinopterygii
- Order: Cichliformes
- Family: Cichlidae
- Genus: Saxatilia
- Species: S. hummelincki

Binomial name
- Saxatilia hummelincki Ploeg, 1991

Synonyms
- Crenicichla hummelincki

= Saxatilia hummelincki =

Species of fish

Saxatilia hummelincki is a species of cichlid native to South America. It is found in the upper Trombetas River basin of the Amazon River basin in Brazil. This species reaches a length of 10.8 cm (4.3 in).

The fish is named in honor of zoologist Pieter Wagenaar Hummelinck (1907-2003), the founder of the Foundation for Scientific Research in Suriname and the Netherlands Antilles, on the occasion of his 83rd birthday.
