= Saxatilia coppenamensis =

Conservation status
- Least Concern (IUCN 3.1)

Scientific classification
- Kingdom: Animalia
- Phylum: Chordata
- Class: Actinopterygii
- Order: Cichliformes
- Family: Cichlidae
- Genus: Saxatilia
- Species: S. coppenamensis

Binomial name
- Saxatilia coppenamensis Ploeg, 1987

Synonyms
- Crenicichla coppenamensis

Species of fish

Saxatilia coppenamensis is a species of pike cichlid native to South America. It is found in the Coppename and Saramacca River drainages in Suriname. This species reaches a length of 17.9 cm (7.0 in).
