= Alex Ploeg =

- Born: 29 March 1956; Velsen, Netherlands
- Died: 17 July 2014 (aged 58) near Hrabove, Donetsk Oblast, Ukraine
- Known for: Research on the genus Crenicichla; ornamental fish industry
- Scientific career
- Fields: Ichthyology

Alex Ploeg (29 March 1956 – 17 July 2014) was a Dutch ichthyologist and lobbyist for the international ornamental fish trade.

== Biography ==
Ploeg studied biology at Utrecht University and received his doctorate in 1983. In the following years, he focused extensively on the genus Crenicichla, describing several species as new to science. In 1991, he defended his dissertation at the University of Amsterdam, a revision of the genus that included fifteen new species descriptions. Of the more than ninety species of Crenicichla, almost twenty were described by Ploeg, in addition to several synonyms.

From 1989 to 1991, Ploeg was curator of a public aquarium in Aruba, and from 1991 to 1992 he worked as an ornamental fish breeder in Bonaire. From 1993 to 2004, he held management positions at several companies in the ornamental fish trade. In 2004, he became secretary-general of the international trade association for the ornamental fish industry, Ornamental Fish International (OFI). In 2006, he also became secretary-general of the European Pet Organization, and in 2009 he took up an advisory position with a Dutch trade association. In these positions, Ploeg lobbied national, European and international legislators and authorities on behalf of the ornamental fish industry. He represented the interests of an industry increasingly subject to restrictions in the areas of animal welfare and species conservation.

On 17 July 2014, Ploeg, his wife Edith, her son Robert, and his friend Robin were killed when Malaysia Airlines Flight 17 was shot down over eastern Ukraine. The couple were survived by two daughters.

== Taxa named after Ploeg ==
- Crenicichla ploegi Varella, Loeb, Lima & Kullander, 2018
- Gymnochanda ploegii Tan & Lim, 2014

== Species described ==
- Crenicichla compressiceps Ploeg, 1986
- Crenicichla coppenamensis Ploeg, 1987
- Crenicichla cyclostoma Ploeg, 1986
- Crenicichla heckeli Ploeg, 1989
- Crenicichla hummelincki Ploeg, 1991
- Crenicichla inpa Ploeg, 1991
- Crenicichla isbrueckeri Ploeg, 1991
- Crenicichla jegui Ploeg, 1986
- Crenicichla menezesi Ploeg, 1991
- Crenicichla nickeriensis Ploeg, 1987
- Crenicichla pellegrini Ploeg, 1991
- Crenicichla pydanielae Ploeg, 1991
- Crenicichla regani Ploeg, 1989
- Crenicichla santosi Ploeg, 1991
- Crenicichla sipaliwini Ploeg, 1987
- Crenicichla stocki Ploeg, 1991
- Crenicichla sveni Ploeg, 1991
- Crenicichla tigrina Ploeg, Jegu & Ferreira, 1991
- Crenicichla virgatula Ploeg, 1991

== Selected publications ==
- The cichlid genus Crenicichla from the Tocantins River, State of Pará, Brazil, with descriptions of four new species (Pisces, Perciformes, Cichlidae). In: Beaufortia 1986, volume 36, no. 5, pp. 57–80.
- Review of the cichlid genus Crenicichla Heckel, 1840 from Surinam, with descriptions of three new species (Pisces, Perciformes, Cichlidae). In: Beaufortia 1987, volume 37, no. 5, pp. 73–98.
- Zwei neue Arten der Gattung Crenicichla Heckel, 1840 aus dem Amazonasbecken, Brasilien. In: Die Aquarien- und Terrarienzeitschrift (DATZ) 1989, volume 42, no. 3, pp. 163–167. ISSN 1616-3222.
- Revision of the South American cichlid genus Crenicichla Heckel, 1840 with descriptions of fifteen new species and considerations on species groups, phylogeny and biogeography (Pisces, Perciformes, Cichlidae). PhD dissertation, University of Amsterdam, 1991.
- Buntbarsche aus Bonaire. In: Die Aquarien- und Terrarienzeitschrift (DATZ) 1992, volume 45, no. 12, pp. 803–805.
- Die Zucht des Gestreiften Seepferdchens bei Marcultura. In: Die Aquarien- und Terrarienzeitschrift (DATZ) 1993, volume 46, no. 5, pp. 304–306.
- With Michael Jégu and Efrem Ferreira: Crenicichla tigrina, une nouvelle espèce de Cichlidae (Pisces, Perciformes) du Rio Trombetas, Pará, Brésil. In: Bulletin Zoölogisch Museum 1991, volume 13, no. 1, pp. 1–11.
