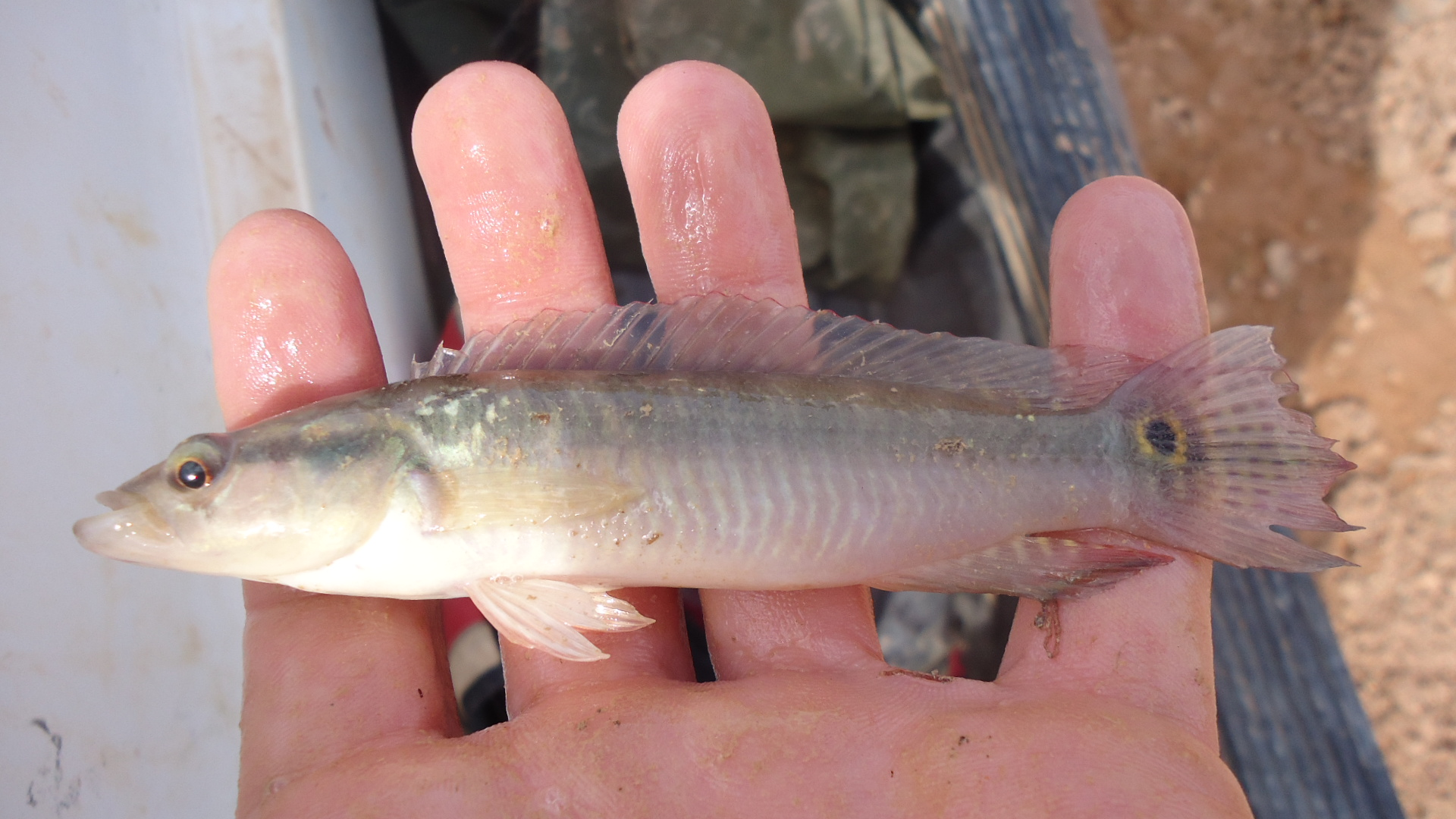

Scientific classification
- Domain: Eukaryota
- Kingdom: Animalia
- Phylum: Chordata
- Class: Actinopterygii
- Order: Cichliformes
- Family: Cichlidae
- Genus: Crenicichla
- Species: C. menezesi

Binomial name
- Crenicichla menezesi Ploeg, 1991

= Crenicichla menezesi =

Species of fish

Crenicichla menezesi is a species of cichlid native to South America. It is found in the Rivers of Maranão, Brazil. This species reaches a length of 18.9 cm (7.4 in).

The fish is named in honor of Naércio Aquino Menezes (b. 1937) of the Museu de Zoologia da Universidade de São Paulo, as thanks for Ploeg’s stay at the museum in October 1987.
