= Digital Fish Library =

Project at University of California, San Diego, USA

The Digital Fish Library (DFL) is a University of California, San Diego project funded by the Biological Infrastructure Initiative (DBI) of the National Science Foundation (NSF). The DFL creates 2D and 3D visualizations of the internal and external anatomy of fish obtained with magnetic resonance imaging (MRI) methods and makes these publicly available on the web.

The information core for the Digital Fish Library is generated using high-resolution MRI scanners housed at the Center for functional magnetic resonance imaging (CfMRI) multi-user facility at UC San Diego. These instruments use magnetic fields to take 3D images of animal tissues, allowing researchers to non-invasively see inside them and quantitatively describe their 3D anatomy. Fish specimens are obtained from the Marine Vertebrate Collection at Scripps Institute of Oceanography (SIO) and imaged by staff from UC San Diego's Center for Scientific Computation in Imaging (CSCI).

As of February 2010, the Digital Fish Library contains almost 300 species covering all five classes of fish, 56 of 60 orders, and close to 200 of the 521 fish families as described by Nelson, 2006. DFL imaging has also contributed to a number of published peer-reviewed scientific studies.

Digital Fish Library work has been featured in the media, including two National Geographic documentaries: Magnetic Navigator and Ultimate Shark.
