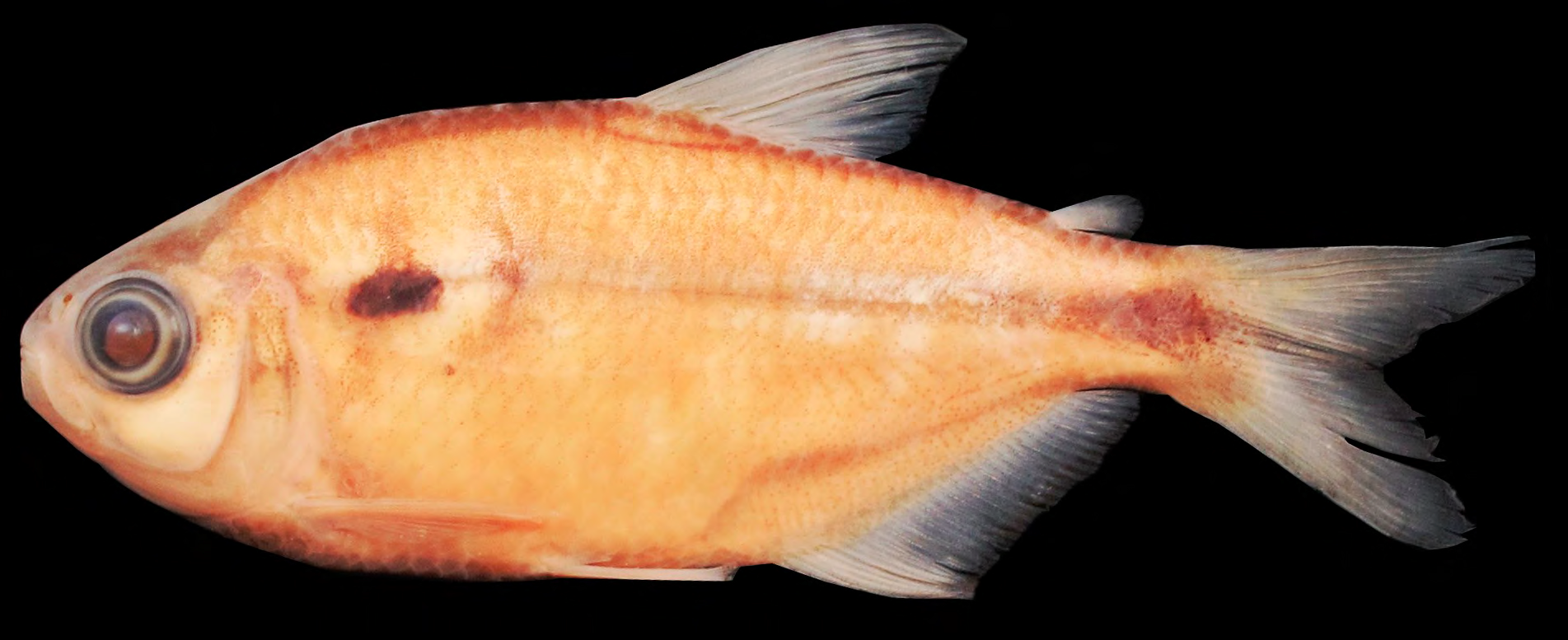

Scientific classification
- Kingdom: Animalia
- Phylum: Chordata
- Class: Actinopterygii
- Order: Characiformes
- Family: Acestrorhamphidae
- Genus: Astyanax
- Species: A. asuncionensis

Binomial name
- Astyanax asuncionensis Géry, 1972

= Astyanax asuncionensis =

Species of fish

Astyanax asuncionensis is a small species of freshwater fish described in 1972 from Asunción, the capital of Paraguay in South America. Its specific epithet is in reference to this. Currently, its range is known to encompass areas of not just Paraguay but also Argentina and Brazil. It is an adaptable, omnivorous species that easily lives in sympatry with various congeners.

There are several congeners to which A. asuncionensis is closely related, including Astyanax altiparanae and Astyanax abramis. Genetic testing has differentiated the species, though A. altiparanae is suspected to form a species complex with A. asuncionensis. These genetic similarities accompany various morphological similarities that make it difficult to visually distinguish A. asuncionensis from congeners upon casual examination.

== Taxonomy ==
Astyanax asuncionensis was originally described by prolific French ichthyologist Jacques Géry in 1972. It was briefly listed as a subspecies of Astyanax bimaculatus, called Astyanax bimaculatus asuncionensis. Before its nomination, specimens of A. asuncionensis were identified by German ichthyologist Carl H. Eigenmann as species Astyanax (Poecilurichthys) bimaculatus paraguayensis (Astyanax paraguayensis) in 1917.

=== Genetics ===
Within the species-group composed of A. asuncionensis and Astyanax altiparanae, there are many morphological similarities and a high rate of genetic diversity. This suggests that the pair may form a cryptic species complex, and the relationship between the two species is not without further complications. There is at least one study proposing that A. asuncionensis and A. altiparanae, as well as Astyanax jacuhiensis, be recognized as junior synonyms of Astyanax lacustris. Congener Astyanax abramis is considered a sister species.

The number of chromosomes differs depending on the species, but A. asuncionensis is a diploid animal - that is, an animal that has chromosomes arranged in pairs - with a chromosome number of 2n=50. (This means it has 25 sets of chromosomes; since each chromosome is in a group of two, the total chromosome number is twice the number of chromosome sets. This is why "2n" is important, where n equals the chromosome sets.) For comparison, humans, also diploid, have a chromosome number of 2n=46.

Within the species, two haplogroups have been designated - more simply, two separate lineages or common ancestors, though they are not different species. Regardless of haplogroups, A. asuncionensis is still considered cryptic, or a single name currently applied to what is likely to be more than one species.

=== Etymology ===
The suffix "-ensis" denotes a location, and Asunción is the capital city of Paraguay, the country from which A. asuncionensis was described. The genus name Astyanax is an allusion to the Trojan warrior Astyanax, son of Troy's prince Hector in Homer's Iliad. Why this name was chosen for the genus was not made clear in the original text, but the scales of type species Astyanax argentatus may be responsible, as they are large and silver in a way that could be compared to armor or a shield.

Astyanax asuncionensis is one of many species, most of them Astyanax, commonly referred to as "lambari" in South America.

== Description ==
Astyanax asuncionensis reaches a maximum of 15.0 cm (5.9 in) standard length (SL). More often, specimens are collected at lengths between 2.5 cm and 6.14 cm SL. The scales are a silvery base color. There is a dark, stretched caudal peduncle spot that extends to the middle rays of the caudal fin, but there is no visible lateral stripe, which contrasts A. asuncionensis with several other species of the genus that are characterized partially by such a marking (such as Astyanax argyrimarginatus, Astyanax clavitaeniatus, and Astyanax goyacensis). A. asuncionensis has a single black humeral spot, and the humeral region also has two brownish vertical bars; these are visual features common to the entire A. bimaculatus species complex.

There are 30–32 rays in the anal fin. The lateral line has 33–40 scales. The body is relatively deep, a feature it shares with several other related species, and there are visible (though faint) concentric lines, called circuli, on the posterior portion of the scales.

=== Sexual dimorphism ===
There are small bony hooks on the anal and pelvic fins on sexually mature males. This trait appears in many members of Astyanax, and can be used to distinguish the sexes upon preliminary examination. (Some species have hooks on the caudal-fin rays instead.)

== Distribution and habitat ==
Astyanax asuncionensis is a widespread freshwater species with an established presence in various river systems spread across several South American countries. Originally described from Paraguay, it is also known from various locales in the provinces of Salta and Jujuy in northwestern Argentina. Specific rivers include the Parana, Paraguay, and Uruguay, as well as small ponds and swamps associated with the Santa Lucia. Further, it has been collected from Brazil. A. asuncionensis is also one of only three representatives of the family Characidae in the Esteros del Iberá (Iberá wetlands), a wetland complex found between the Parana and Uruguay rivers. (The other two are also members of Astyanax.)

== Diet and ecology ==
Specific details are sparse, but A. asuncionensis is an omnivorous species that consumes plentiful allochthonous material; for example, it is one of various animals known to feed on the Ambay pumpwood (Cecropia pachystachya). In turn, A. asuncionensis is preyed upon by various parasitic nematodes of the families Capillariidae and Acuariidae, such as Spinitectus rodolphiheringi.

Astyanax asuncionensis lives in sympatry with congeners Astyanax puka, Astyanax abramis, and Astyanax eigenmanniorum. It does not have specific environmental needs, able to tolerate a wide variety of habitats and the existing fauna therein.

== Conservation status ==
Astyanax asuncioensis has not been evaluated by the IUCN. Nonetheless, its widespread and adaptable nature makes it unlikely to be endangered. Further, several of its habitats are under government protection. For instance, in the Iberá wetlands - the second-largest wetland complex in the world - a park has been established, and there is a focus on conservation tourism, with the aim of educating visitors about the threats facing the region.
