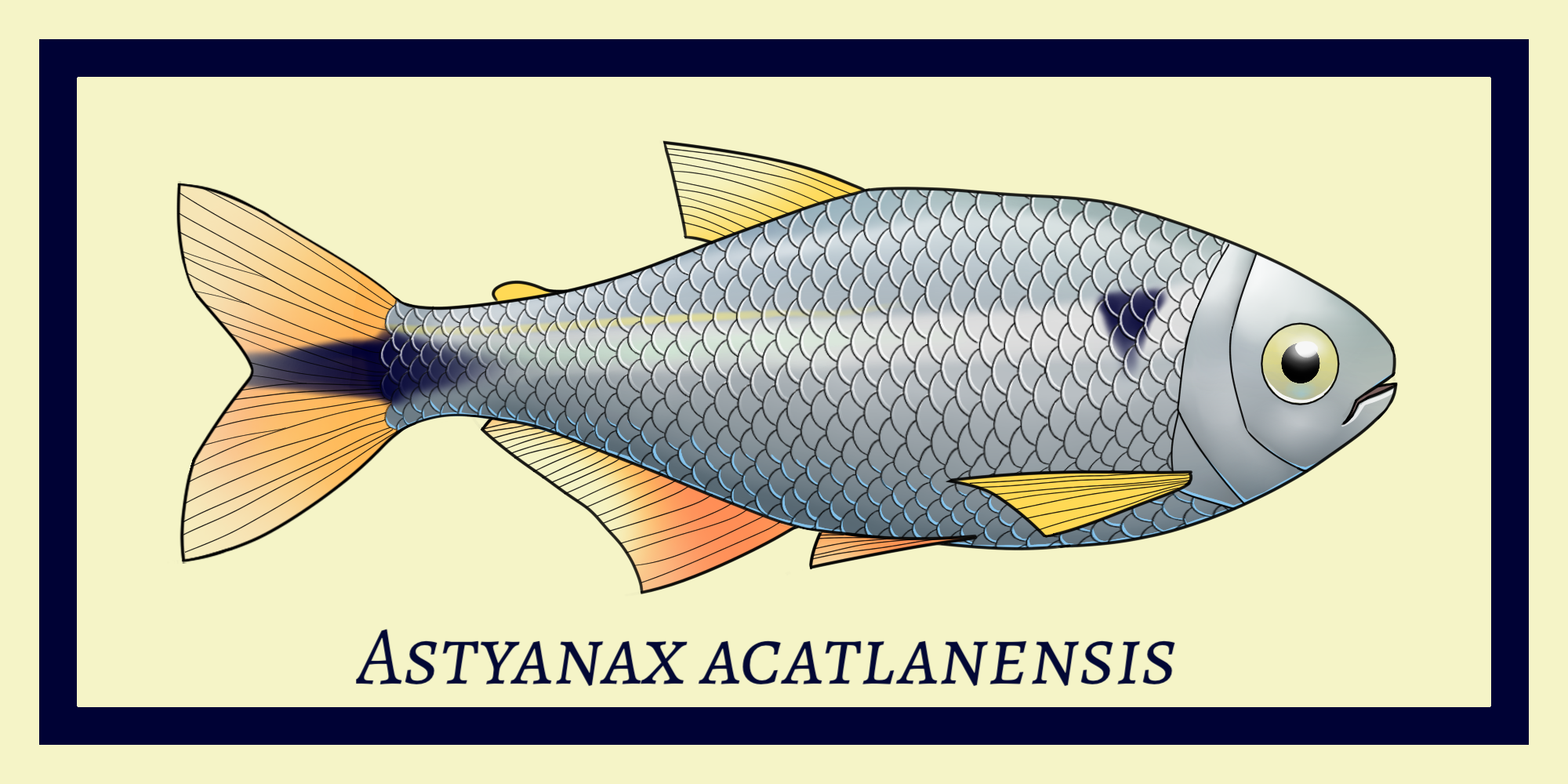

Conservation status
- Data Deficient (IUCN 3.1)

Scientific classification
- Kingdom: Animalia
- Phylum: Chordata
- Class: Actinopterygii
- Order: Characiformes
- Family: Acestrorhamphidae
- Genus: Astyanax
- Species: A. acatlanensis

Binomial name
- Astyanax acatlanensis Schmitter-Soto, 2017

= Astyanax acatlanensis =

Species of fish

Astyanax acatlanensis, sometimes called the Acatlán tetra, is a species of freshwater ray-finned fish belonging to the family Acestrorhamphidae, the American characins. This fish is found in the rivers of Mexico. It is a relatively hardy species that is able to tolerate a variety of water conditions, but is only found in freshwater, never brackish or marine. It is known only from the Río Acatlán, which is its type locality, and the Río Jía, which is a small, unknown river in the Oaxaca region.

It is a relatively recent addition to the already-speciose Astyanax, named in 2017 as part of an in-depth revision of the genus' presence in Central and North America. Before its species distinction, it was one of various species considered synonymous with congener Astyanax aeneus, partially due to overlapping range and morphological similarity.

== Description ==
Astyanax acatlanensis is mostly silver in color, with a blue or green tint dorsally. Its sides may bear an indistinct streak in a plainer silver, and it often has a humeral spot in the shape of an inverted triangle. The anal fin has sparse pigmentation, mostly concentrated into the central rays, and it has a spot of pigment on its caudal peduncle that extends onto the fin-rays, where it is slightly less intense. It is a small fish, reaching roughly 7.5 centimetres (3.0 in) in standard length (SL), and it has a spine with 32–33 vertebrae.

Notable morphometric characteristics include modally 12 predorsal scales, modally 15.5 or fewer scales around caudal peduncle, and a short head, mean 23.8% SL. Mature specimens may develop small fleshy extensions on the anal or pelvic fins, called nuptial spines or tubercles, and these are simple (solid-bodied, as opposed to bifid in some congeners). Nuptial tubercles are only seen on male specimens in the majority of fish species, which suggests relevant sexual dimorphism in A. acatlanensis, but females in other fish species may demonstrate them; details on A. acatlanensis are sparse.

== Taxonomy ==
Originally, A. acatlanensis was grouped in with Astyanax aeneus, alongside various other species. However, a revision of the genus in 2017 by Mexican ichthyologist Juan J. Schmitter-Soto (specifically members from Central and North America) prompted its recognition as a separate species, albeit an under-studied one. American ichthyologist Robert Rush Miller noted in 1992 literature that the population inhabiting the Río Jía was likely unknown to science. Otherwise, A. acatlanensis has no known synonyms, and has retained its basionym since nomination.

=== Etymology ===
The type locality of A. acatlanensis is the Río Acatlán, Puebla, México, and the suffix "-ensis" denotes a location of origin. The reason for the genus name Astyanax was not made clear in the original literature, but the name itself originates from the Iliad, a famous Greek epic poem; Astyanax was a Trojan prince, the son of famed warrior Hector. The allusion possibly lies in the scales of type species Astyanax argentatus, which are large and armor-like.

Astyanax acatlanensis is not widely known under a particular common name, but is usually referred to as the Acatlán tetra, given its type locality.

== Distribution and habitat ==
Because it is a recent addition to the genus, the range of A. acatlanensis has not been studied extensively. As of its nomination, it was only known from the Río Acatlán, which is its type locality, and the Río Jía, another Mexican river.

The Río Acatlán is also sometimes called the Tizaa or Tizaac river, depending on location, and is considered to occupy its own sub-basin. Tizaa is a word from the Mixtec language that means "river on fire", but literature on the environment of the river itself is lacking.

The locale of the specimens collected from the Río Jía is described as "1.5 mi (2.4 km) W of Guelatao, Oaxaca, Mexico", but literature regarding the Río Jía is otherwise sparse.

== Diet and ecology ==
While little is known about the diet of A. acatlanensis in particular, other members of the genus located further South demonstrate primarily herbivorous leanings and the occasional omnivorous trait. The most common food items appear to be algae, terrestrial plants, and fallen fruits and seeds.

Astyanax acatlanensis is known to be amongst prey items in the diet of the neotropical otter (Lontra longicaudis), specifically in the southern Tehuacán-Cuicatlán Biosphere Reserve of Mexico.

== Conservation status ==
Upon evaluation by the IUCN, A. acatlanensis was categorized as data deficient. Without more extensive knowledge of population levels, ecological threats, and potential anthropogenic hazards, there is no way to determine whether or not A. acatlanensis is in a sustainable position as a species. However, general study of Mexico's rivers has revealed extensive human activity that not only threatens the ecology of various regions but is also a potential health hazard to the many towns and cities that rely on the Mexican watershed for resources. Nonetheless, A. acatlanensis is known to be a hardy species that can tolerate various pollutants.
