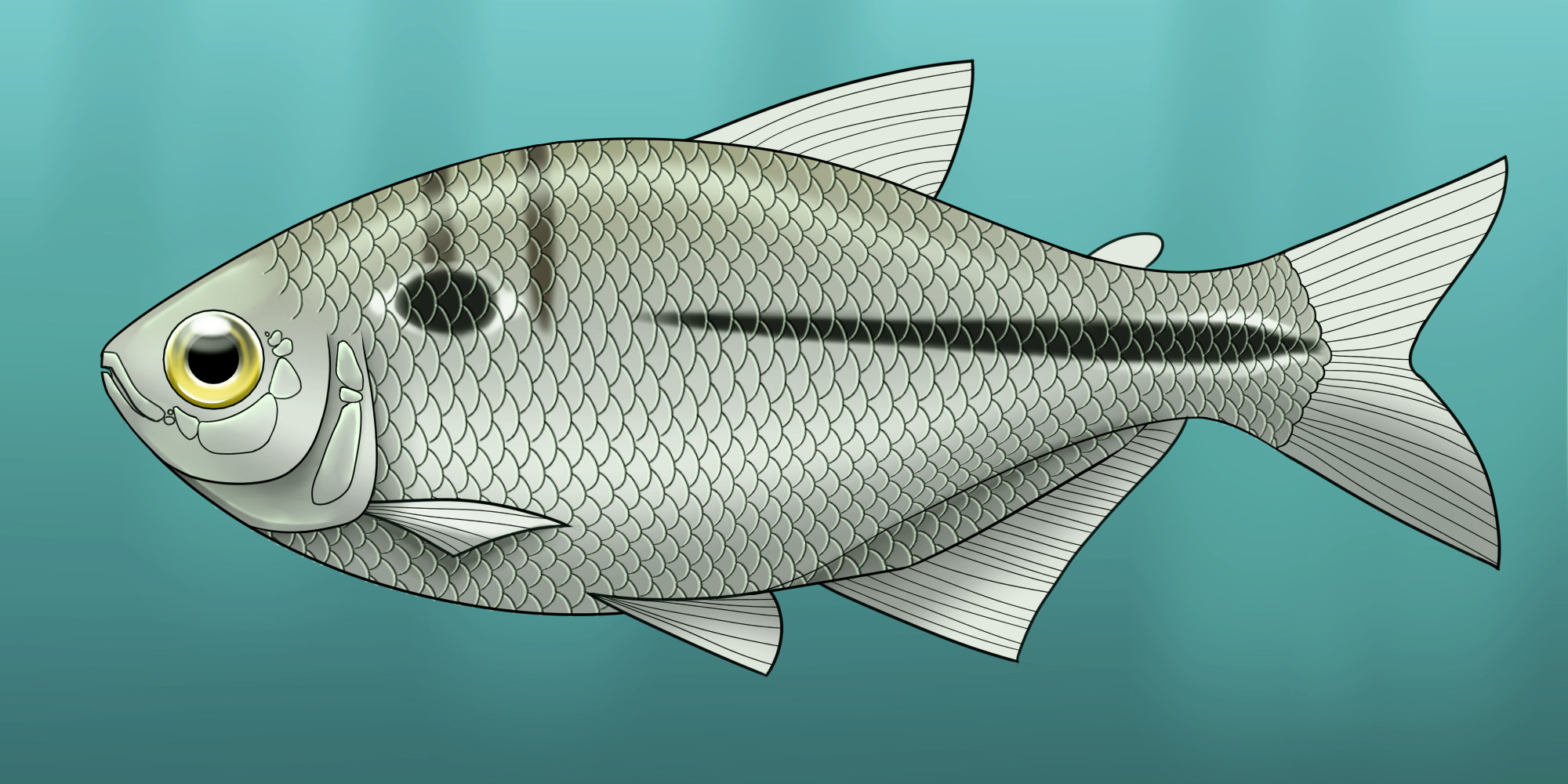
- Illustration

Conservation status
- Least Concern (IUCN 3.1)

Scientific classification
- Kingdom: Animalia
- Phylum: Chordata
- Class: Actinopterygii
- Order: Characiformes
- Family: Acestrorhamphidae
- Genus: Astyanax
- Species: A. clavitaeniatus

Binomial name
- Astyanax clavitaeniatus Garutti, 2003

= Astyanax clavitaeniatus =

Species of fish

Astyanax clavitaeniatus is a species of freshwater ray-finned fish belonging to the family Acestrorhamphidae, the American characins. This fish is found in various rivers in the Amazon basin. It is characterized by a club-shaped lateral stripe, which is where it gets its scientific name; "clava" means "club", and "taenia" means "stripe". It is a deep-bodied fish with a silvery base color, which is not uncommon for members of Astyanax. Its markings - including a humeral spot and two vertical brown bars - indicate that it is a part of a species complex centered around congener Astyanax bimaculatus.

A. clavitaeniatus has been assessment as "Least Concern" on the IUCN Red List. It is known to be hardy and adaptable (sometimes to a remarkable degree). These similarities, as well as a widespread habitat, indicate a species at low risk. Other elements that may affect its survivability, such as diet and behavior, have not been the subject of extensive research.

== Taxonomy ==
Astyanax clavitaeniatus was described in 2003, alongside Astyanax siapae, as a part of a redescription of congener Astyanax rupununi, which was formerly considered a synonym of Astyanax bimaculatus. All four species are a part of the A. bimaculatus species complex, which also housed roughly a dozen other species when A. clavitaeniatus was described; this number changes regularly, given the complex phyletic relationships therein. As of 2011, the A. bimaculatus species complex contained at least 20 species. (Species in the A. bimaculatus group often share elements of pattern and coloration, including A. clavitaeniatus, but can further be linked by genetic evidence, such as chromosomal makeup.)

Astyanax clativaeniatus has no known synonyms. It also lacks a common name; "club-striped tetra" and "club-striped astyanax" have been suggested based upon its scientific name and physical descriptors.

=== Etymology ===
The genus name "Astyanax" is an allusion to the Iliad, though the reason was not made clear in the original text; Astyanax was a warrior of Troy and son of prince Hector. One possibility is that the scales of the type species Astyanax argentatus, which are large and silvery, reminded researchers of armor or a shield, as a warrior might have worn. The species name "clavitaeniatus" comes from Latin, wherein "clava" means "club" and "taenia" means "band" or "stripe", in reference to a dark lateral stripe that gradually thickens towards the tail before tapering off sharply, which results in a club or cudgel shape.

== Description ==
Astyanax clavitaeniatus reaches roughly 7.2 cm (2.8 in) standard length (SL, without the tail fin included). The body is deep, at least 37.4% the length of the body (but usually deeper), and slightly elongated. The caudal peduncle is thick. The snout, slightly pointed, is equal to or less than the diameter of the eye in length. The dorsal fin is situated at the midpoint of the body, and sports 12 rays (3 branched and 9 unbranched). There are 19 caudal-fin rays, 26–32 anal-fin rays, 8 or 9 pelvic-fin rays, and 12 or 13 pectoral-fin rays. Early studies presented clear morphometric differences between A. clavitaeniatus, A. siapae, and A. rupununi, but more modern understandings recognize a great deal of overlap between the three.

The coloration is generally similar to what most species in the A. bimaculatus complex present. Generally, the body ranges from silver to silver-blue or silver-green, with a darker back and paler belly. There is a distinct humeral spot that is rounded or horizontal. Two vertical bars in a dark-brown color are present, with one intersecting the humeral spot and the other 2 or 3 scales behind. In others of the complex, there is often a dark spot on the caudal peduncle that continues onto the fin-rays; A. clavitaeniatus lacks the caudal spot and fin-ray pigmentation, instead presenting with a continued lateral stripe of greatly reduced width (roughly 1/5th of a scale). There are also two silvery spots above the humeral spot, one just in front and one just behind. In alcohol, the coloration remains largely the same, though with plain silver instead of with touches of green or blue. The fins are largely clear.

=== Sexual dimorphism ===
In mature males of A. clavitaeniatus, the pelvic and anal fins sport bony hooks on select rays of the anal and pelvic fins; there is no difference in coloration. The presence of bony hooks on some fins is not an uncommon dimorphism in species of Astyanax, but they are rare in other members of the family Characidae. (Only a handful of species of Astyanax, such as A. bagual, demonstrate these hooks on all fins.)

== Distribution and ecology ==
Astyanax clavitaeniatus was originally described from the Surumu river in Roraima, Brazil; paratypes were also collected from the Uraricoera river, in Fazenda Canadá creek and Pau Rocho creek. Other specimens have been collected from the Río Takutu, as well as the Ríos Branco and Negro. All of its habitats are found within the Amazon Basin. Little else has been researched of its ecology, such as diet or behavior.

While it is not known to widely share its habitat with other species of Astyanax, it does live in sympatry with A. rupununi and A. bimaculatus in the Río Takutu. Other sympatric species include members of the genera Hemigrammus, Hyphessobrycon, Jupiaba, and Moenkhausia, as well as the tetra Iguanodectes spilurus.

== Conservation status ==
Astyanax clavitaeniatus has not been evaluated by the IUCN. However, the Chico Mendes Institute for Biodiversity Conservation considers it a species of least concern ("pouco preocupante"). Various similar species of Astyanax, including multiple in the A. bimaculatus complex, are remarkably hardy and adaptable species, which likely remains the case for A. clavitaeniatus.
