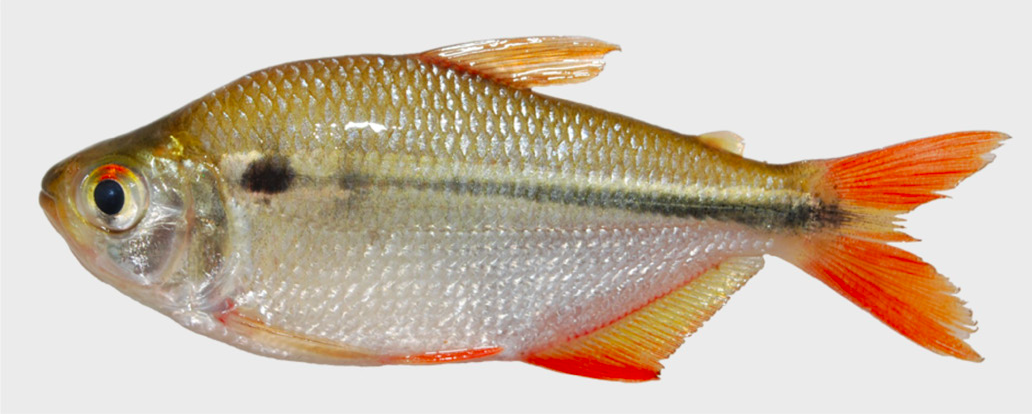

Conservation status
- Least Concern (IUCN 3.1)

Scientific classification
- Kingdom: Animalia
- Phylum: Chordata
- Class: Actinopterygii
- Order: Characiformes
- Family: Acestrorhamphidae
- Genus: Astyanax
- Species: A. argyrimarginatus

Binomial name
- Astyanax argyrimarginatus Garutti, 1999

= Astyanax argyrimarginatus =

Species of fish

Astyanax argyrimarginatus is a species of freshwater ray-finned fish belonging to the family Acestrorhamphidae, the American characins. This fish is found in various river basins in Brazil. Originally thought to be restricted to the Tocantins-Araguaia river system, a study in 2012 expanded its range to include the Rio Xingu, as well. Specific biotope preferences are unknown, but it is mostly collected from clearwater streams in fairly good health. Its relative abundance and presence in some protected locales means that it is not endangered.

This species is a part of a complex centered around congener Astyanax bimaculatus. Visually, it bears similarities to other species also within the complex, including reddish fins and a dark humeral spot, but its most distinguishing feature is a black lateral stripe with bright-silver edges. This stripe is the origin of its scientific name, which means "silver border".

== Taxonomy ==
Astyanax argyrimarginatus was originally described in 1999 by Brazilian ichthyologist Valdener Garutti. Given morphological similarities to various other members of the genus, Garutti assigned the species to the Astyanax bimaculatus species complex, which is where it remains today, alongside various other species. It has no known synonyms.

In genetic research, A. argyrimarginatus has been found to have karyotypic (chromosomal) similarities with congeners A. bimaculatus and A. altiparanae. This is not unusual, considering that A. altiparanae is in the A. bimaculatus species complex with the other two. It is unlikely, however, that A. argyrimarginatus is synonymous with any known species; it can be identified strongly and without confusion through genetic information, using a technique known as DNA barcoding.

=== Etymology ===
The specific epithet originates in Greek. The word "argyros" means "silver", and "marginatus" means "bordered"; this is in reference to the silver lining around the black lateral stripe. The genus name, Astyanax, is an allusion to the Iliad, in which a Trojan warrior named Astyanax appeared. The reason for this allusion was not made clear in the nominal text, but it may originate in the scales of type species, Astyanax argentatus, which are large and silver, like armor or a shield.

In terms of a common name, A. argyrimarginatus is one of many species of small fish sometimes referred to as "lambari" in South America.

== Description ==
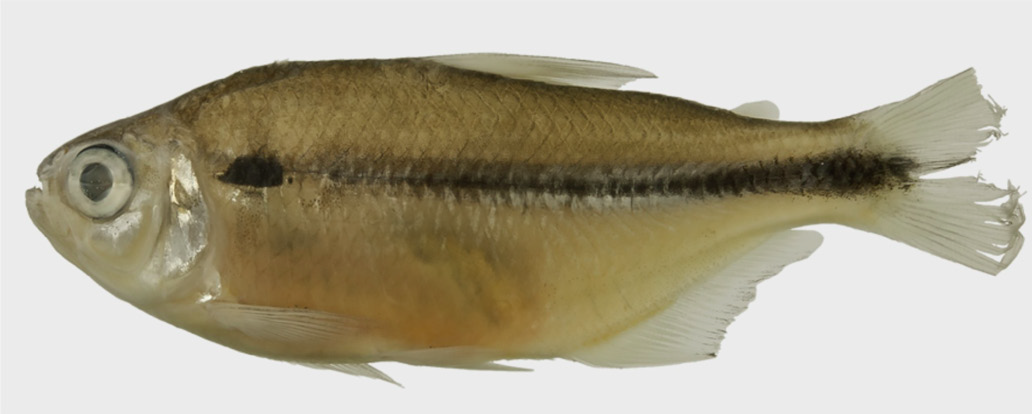
A preserved specimen of Astyanax argyrimarginatus. Note the silver outline on the lateral stripe, which is still visible upon preservation.

Astyanax argyrimarginatus reaches a maximum of 4.5 cm (1.8 in) standard length (SL). There are 42–46 scales in the lateral line, 27–31 rays in the anal fin, and a single tooth in the maxillary bone; the premaxilla sports multiple multicuspid teeth. The head averages a length of 26.8% of the body, and the eye is large, taking up 34–38% of the head's length.

The scales are silver. The fins are largely red, with more intense coloration on the caudal fin and on the front rays of the anal fin. There is a dark humeral spot in the shape of a horizontal oval, and two dark-brown vertical bars in the same region of the body. A dark blotch of color on the caudal peduncle extends to the tips of the middle caudal-fin rays. Perhaps the most distinctive feature is the dark lateral stripe, which has a bright silver border.

=== Sexual Dimorphism ===
On the anal fins of males larger than 7.5 cm (3.0 in), bony hooks are present. This is a feature not uncommon in the entire family Characidae. Otherwise, few morphometric or coloration differences can be discerned upon examination. Some congeners demonstrate more dramatic instances of sexual dimorphism, such as A. aramburui; mature males therein bear the same bony hooks, but they also grow small fleshy protrusions on the head and scales.

== Distribution and ecology ==
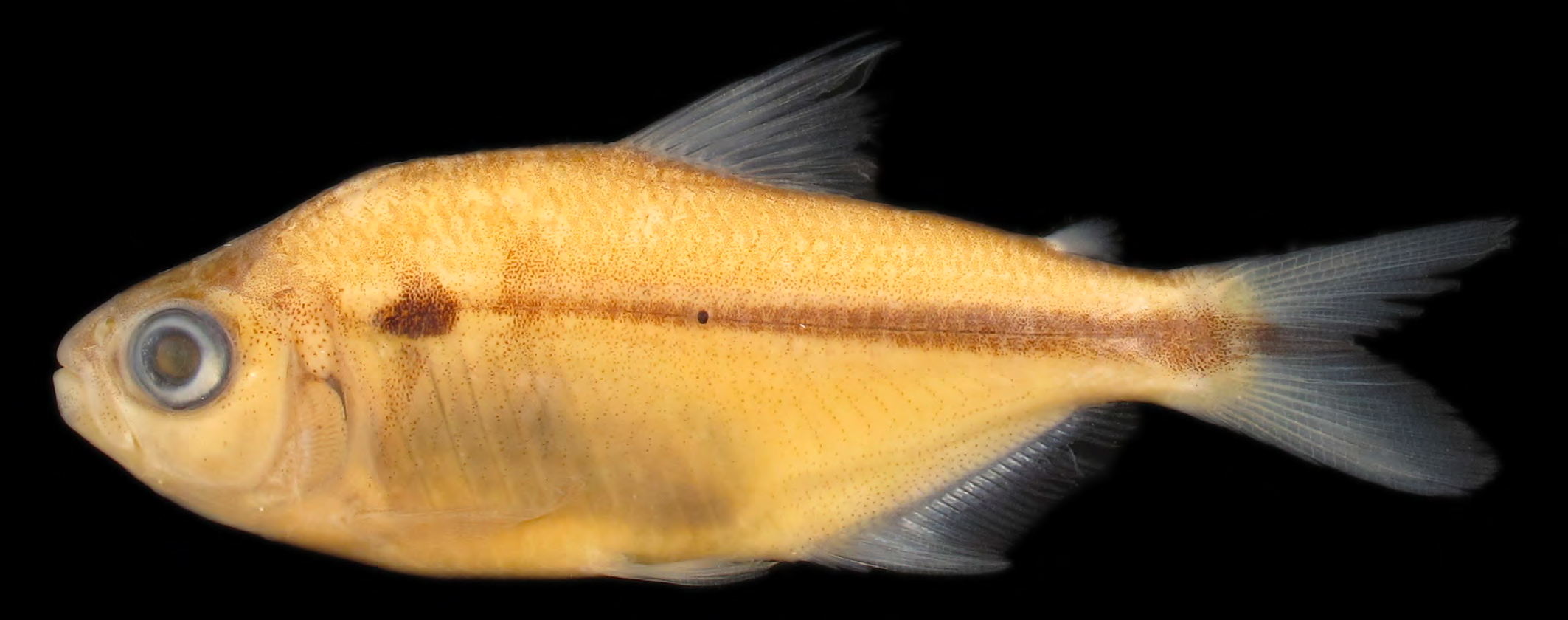
A preserved specimen of Astyanax argyrimarginatus, captured from the rio Araguaia basin.

Astyanax argyrimarginatus was originally described from the Araguaia River basin of Brazil. Its range also includes the Tocantins and Xingu river basins, in the Brazilian states of Goiás and Mato Grosso. The Xingu is a more recent addition, from a study of the species' geographical range in 2012. Generally, it can be found in river headwaters and in various small streams.

The Araguaia and Tocantins rivers are a part of a single river system, despite differing ecotypes. The Tocantins is relatively clear, with rapids and waterfalls; the Araguaia is muddy and winding, part of the local floodplains. The Xingu is another clearwater river, and it runs through the stony areas of the Brazilian geoscape.

Little is known regarding the physiology and feeding habits of A. argyrimarginatus. Other members of the genus are generally adaptable omnivores, and are not shy of allochthonous material; this may remain the case for A. argyrimarginatus, but specifics are sparse.

== Conservation status ==
Astyanax argyrimarginatus is considered a species of least concern by the IUCN. Though its habitat includes some locations affected by human development and pollution, no threats are of direct importance to the population as a whole.

A specific example of threatened habitat for A. argyrimarginatus is the Xingu river, which is the subject of various infrastructure projects. One project with notable impact on the Xingu as a whole is the Belo Monte dam, which radically altered the flow of the river upon construction. Agriculture and the corresponding deforestation also pose a threat to the health of the riparian zone, not just the waters. On the other hand, a great deal of the Xingu is contained within the protected Xingu National Park and Indigenous Peoples Preserve, which was put in place as a protective measure for various indigenous cultures and the biodiversity of the region.
