= Saxatilia frenata =

Conservation status
- Least Concern (IUCN 3.1)

Scientific classification
- Kingdom: Animalia
- Phylum: Chordata
- Class: Actinopterygii
- Order: Cichliformes
- Family: Cichlidae
- Genus: Saxatilia
- Species: S. frenata

Binomial name
- Saxatilia frenata T. N. Gill, 1858

Synonyms
- Crenicichla frenata

Species of fish

Saxatilia frenata is a species of cichlid native to South America. It is found in Trinidad and northeastern Venezuela. This species reaches a length of 11.6 cm (4.6 in).
