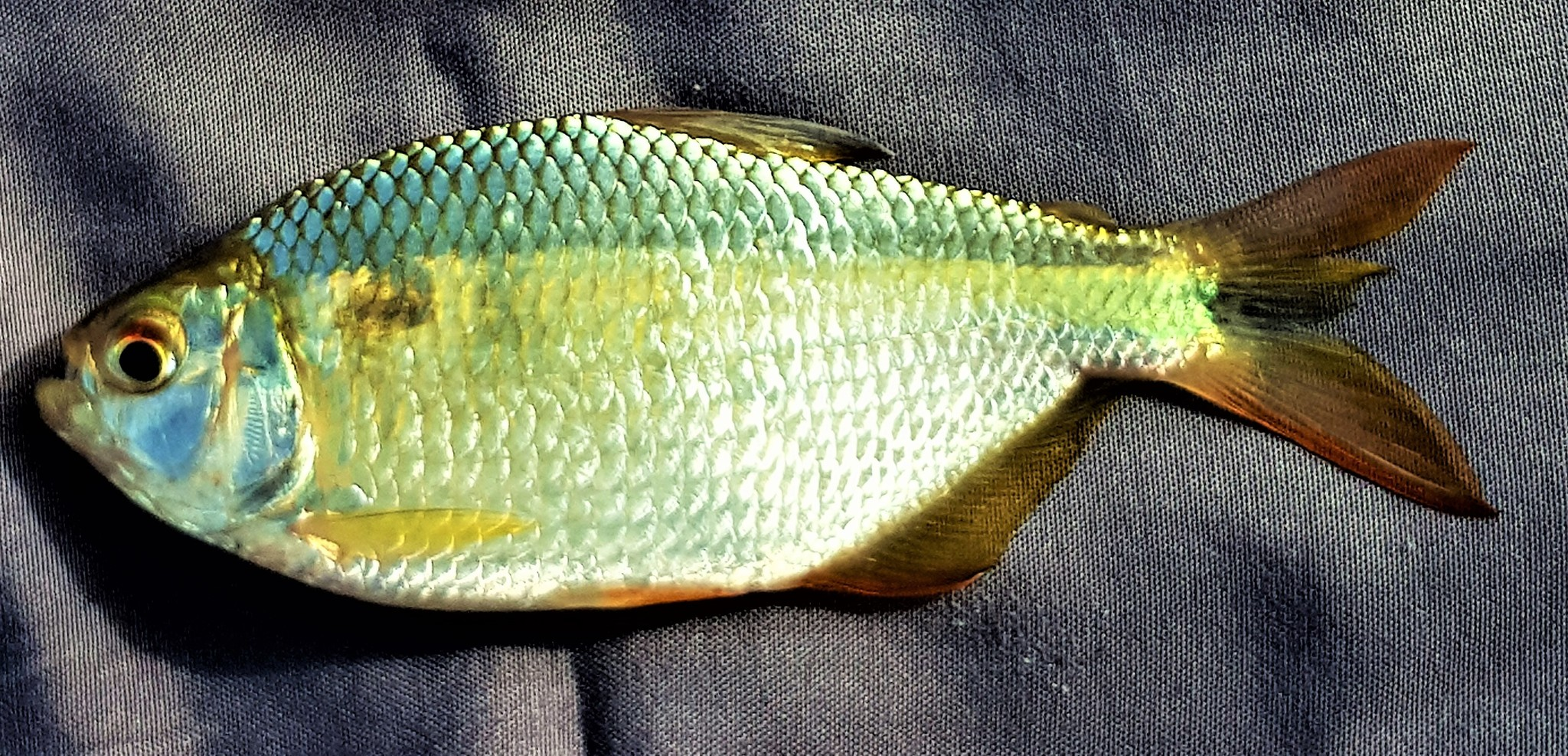

Conservation status
- Least Concern (IUCN 3.1)

Scientific classification
- Kingdom: Animalia
- Phylum: Chordata
- Class: Actinopterygii
- Division: Teleostei
- Order: Characiformes
- Family: Acestrorhamphidae
- Genus: Astyanax
- Species: A. bimaculatus

Binomial name
- Astyanax bimaculatus Linnaeus, 1758

Synonyms
- Salmo bimaculatus Linnaeus, 1758; Tetragonopterus maculatus Müller& Troschel, 1845; Tetragonopterus linnaei Valenciennes, 1850; Tetragonopterus gronovii Valenciennes, 1850; Tetragonopterus wappi Valenciennes, 1850; Tetragonopterus bartlettii Günther, 1866; Tetragonopterus orientalis Cope, 1870

= Astyanax bimaculatus =

Species of fish

Astyanax bimaculatus, the twospot astyanax ( also called the two-spot tetra, is a species of freshwater ray-finned fish belonging to the family Acestrorhamphidae, the American characins. This fish is found in South America. It is a middlingly common tetra in the aquarium industry, with hobbyist reports of its sale and presence, and it is also a well-studied member of the genus Astyanax in wild settings. Amateur aquarists report peaceful schooling behavior in captivity, though fish in wild schools may turn on one another if presented with the threat of a predatory species.

Its very earliest report was by prolific taxonomist Carl Linnaeus in 1758, in the 10th edition of Systema Naturae. Linnaeus designated it a member of genus Salmo, and since then it has also been considered a member of the genus Tetragonopterus before being placed in Astyanax. Currently, A. bimaculatus is at the center of a species complex, and specific species relationships are still being deciphered in modern ichthyological studies. As it stands, no monophyly can be guaranteed from A. bimaculatus.

Astyanax bimaculatus is omnivorous, eating plants, zooplankton, and various forms of detritus. It is also known to occasionally target other fish to eat their scales. In turn, A. bimaculatus is regularly preyed upon by Hoplias malabaricus, the trahira, as well as various heron species (genus Ardea). It is also host to a variety of parasites, most often flukes (Monogenea). Further, A. bimaculatus is a farmed fish for human use, such as consumption or bait.

== Taxonomy ==
When first described by Carl Linnaeus in 1758, A. bimaculatus was given the name Salmo bimaculatus. Throughout the 1800s, various species were named under the genus Tetragonopterus, all of which were later found to be synonymous with A. bimaculatus. In 1912, A. bimaculatus was momentarily considered a species of genus Poecilurichthys. The species Tetragonopterus caudomaculatus, today known as Bryconops caudomaculatus, was once mistakenly identified as being a possible synonym or otherwise close relative.

Astyanax bimaculatus is at the center of a species complex and species subgroup bearing its name. The subgroup in question is made up of at least 20 species, all of which are characterized by various morphological similarities. These species include - but are not limited to - A. argyrimarginatus, A. clavitaeniatus, A. goyacensis, A. novae, A. rupununi, A. saltor, A. siapae, A. unitaeniatus, A. utiariti, A. validus, A. abramis, A. maculisquamis, A. borealis, and A. orbignyanus. In past studies of species in this group, it has been simpler for researchers to ignore designations and consider all examined specimens to be examples of A. bimaculatus, delineating by region instead of name.

=== Genetics ===
In terms of genetic information, A. bimaculatus is a notably variable species. Chromosomal study reveals a distinct - and complex - cytotype, or arrangement and number of chromosomes, for populations in different regions. Genetic diversity in the species is not lowered by the presence of waterfalls or dams that separate different populations. An interesting factor in the chromosomal makeup of A. bimaculatus, specifically populations in the Amazon region, is the presence of a B microchromosome, a particularly small type of chromosome present in some birds, reptiles, and fish; little is known regarding the origin and evolution of B microchomosomes.

In genetic studies, many animals are diploid, which means that chromosomes arrange themselves in pairs. When the variable "n" represents chromosome sets, then a diploid animal's chromosome number is represented by "2n". For A. bimaculatus, which is indeed diploid, this number is 2n=50. (To compare, this number is 2n=46 in humans.) The chromosome number 2n=50 is shared by various other species in the A. bimaculatus complex, such as A. lacustris, A. altiparanae, A. asuncionensis, and A. jacuhiensis.

=== Etymology ===
The genus Astyanax has a name which is an allusion to the Iliad, in which a Trojan warrior named Astyanax appeared. The reason for this allusion was not made clear by Spencer Fullerton Baird and Charles Frédéric Girard when they named the genus, but it may originate in the scales of type species, Astyanax argentatus, which are large and silver, like armor or a shield. The specific name, bimaculatus, means "two-spotted", in reference to the distinct pair of markings - the humeral spot and the spot on the caudal peduncle. These two spots also earn A. bimaculatus the common name "twospot astyanax".

== Description ==
Astyanax bimaculatus reaches a maximum total length of 17.5 cm (6.9 in), and a maximum weight of 91.6 g (3.23 oz). The scales are large, and lack distinct radii originating from a single point in the center of each; the presence of such lines was a trait once ascribed to A. bimaculatus, but has since been recognized as a trait of congener A. abramis instead. There are 33 lateral-line scales, 26–27 dorsal-fin rays, and 26–30 anal-fin rays. Before taxonomic revisions, the reported variation in the numbers of fin-rays and lateral-line scales was much greater, due to separate species all being grouped under a single name.

The back is dark-green, the sides a silver-yellow, and there is a clear silver lateral stripe. The base of the dorsal fin and the upper lobe of the caudal fin may be strongly red, pink, or yellow, with reduced coloration in the rest of the fin. There is a strong black humeral spot, and another strong blotch of pigment at the base of the caudal fin that extends onto the middle caudal-fin rays; these two spots are shared amongst all members of the A. bimaculatus species complex, which is often considered one of the defining characteristics therein, even if a small handful of species do not conform, including A. elachylepis and A. varzeae. Markings also characteristic of this complex include two brown vertical bars in the humeral region.

=== Sexual dimorphism ===
Female specimens of A. bimaculatus are larger than males. Bony hooks also develop on the anal and pelvic fins of sexually mature males during spawning season, then regress afterwards.

== Ecology ==
=== Diet ===
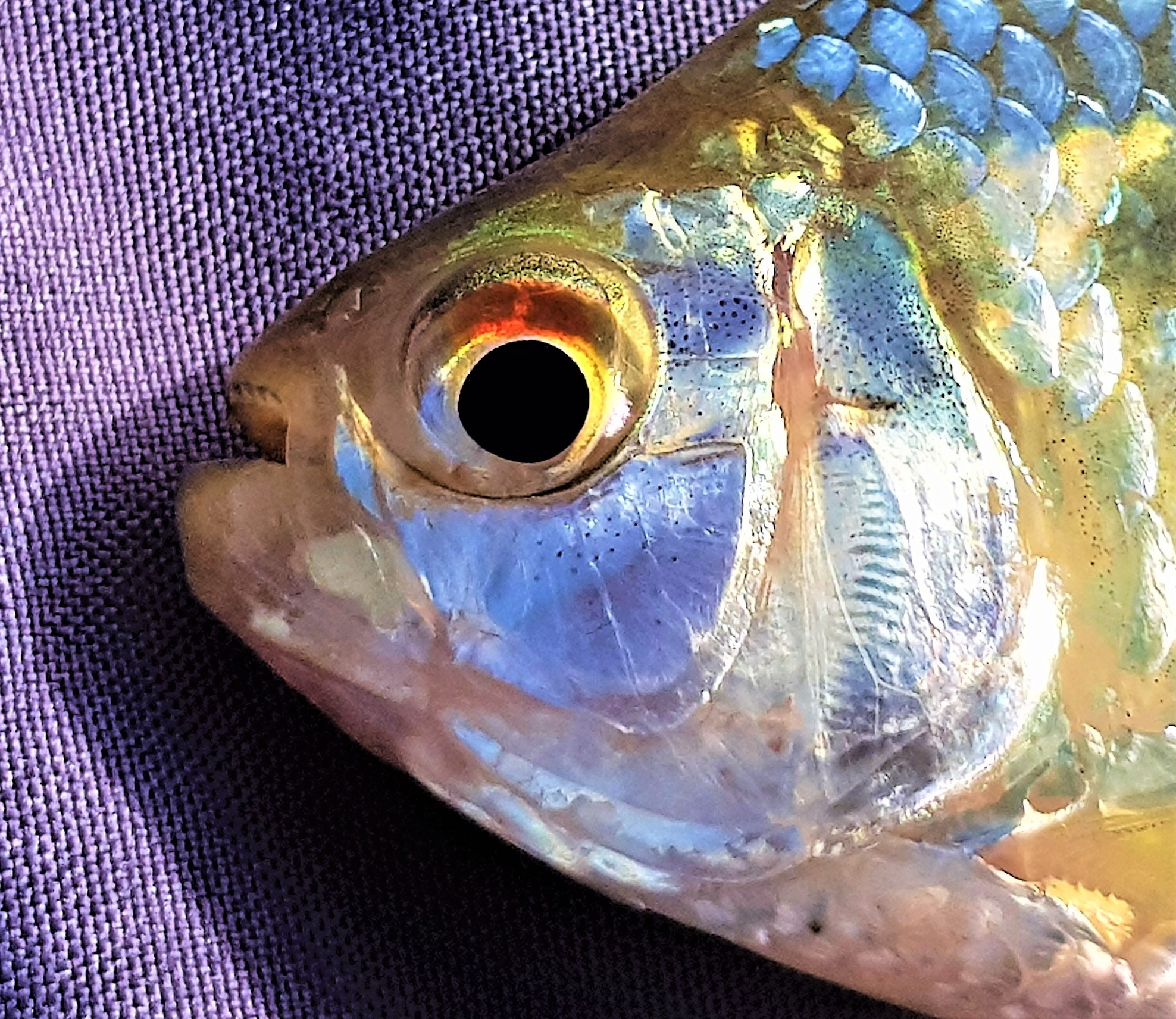
Detail of face and jaw.

Astyanax bimaculatus is an omnivorous fish with a leaning towards plant matter. Roughly 60% of the diet is vegetal in nature, and 40% of animals; of these, dicots are the most prevalent in plants, and insects the most prevalent in animals. However, when presented with a shortage of food, A. bimaculatus is remarkably capable of changing its dietary composition. As a further demonstration of adaptability, A. bimaculatus has been recorded following around another fish species - namely Corydoras polystictus - to take advantage of the invertebrates, detritus, and algae that C. polystictus flushes out during its foraging activity.

Because it mostly eats plant matter, it serves an important role in the food chain, transferring that energy up into the animals that prey upon it. This role also allows it to transmit disease to its predators.

=== Distribution ===
Astyanax bimaculatus has an enormous distribution. The rivers and basins it can be found in include, but are not limited to: the Amazonas estuaries and the main channel, Apure, Araguaia, Atrato, Beni-Madre de Dios, Branco, Cauca-Magdalena-Sinu, Coppename, Suriname, Saramacca, Corentyne-Demerara, Essequibo, Guapore, Itapicuru-Mearim, lapura, middle-lower Madeira, Mamore, Maroni-Approuague, Oiapoque, Orinoco (upper and lower), Parnaiba, Purus, Putumayo, upper Tocantins, Ucayali, and upper Xingu.

Though considered sedentary, A. bimaculatus (and members of its species complex) can undertake short-distance migrations if necessary.

=== Habitat ===
Because of its remarkable range, A. bimaculatus is tolerant of a wide range of conditions. However, it remains entirely potamodromous (freshwater), and seems to have a preference for water with a pH of 5.5–7.5. Nonetheless, it can stay alive for long periods of time in suboptimal conditions; one example, documented by zoologist William Beebe in 1942, was a wide variety of aquatic life stranded in a pond that had been reduced to a mud puddle in the severe dry season of Caripito, Venezuela. Of 32 A. bimaculatus individuals trapped therein, 12 remained alive in surroundings that should not have sustained them for as long as had already been endured.

=== Sympatric species ===
The native range of A. bimaculatus ensures that it will overlap with a great deal of other aquatic species. Its relatively peaceful nature means that it can often coexist without incident, and its dietary flexibility means that ecological competition is unnecessary; if one food item is scarce, it can simply shift targets. As such, environments with high species diversity are not of issue for A. bimaculatus.

One of the most comprehensive lists of species found alongside A. bimaculatus came as a result of William Beebe's discovery of a drying-up pond in Venezuela. Fascinated by the circumstances and by just how many animals had remained alive in such poor conditions, Beebe made an annotated list of all of the species he and his colleagues could identify. Fish species found therein with A. bimaculatus include, but are certainly not limited to: Ochmacanthus flabelliferus, Callichthys callichthys, Hoplosternum littorale, Farlowella acus, Copella arnoldi, Creagrutus beni, Erythrinus erythrinus, Gephyrocharax valencia, Hoplerythrinus unitaeniatus, Pristella maxillaris, and Serrasalmus eigenmanni. Also in the same location were Pipa pipa, the common Surinam toad, and Rhinoclemmys punctularia, the spot-legged wood turtle.

Astyanax bimaculatus has further been collected at turbid-water sites that host Crenicichla britskii, Aphyocheirodon hemigrammus, Hemigrammus marginatus, Hyphessobrycon eques, Gymnocorymbus thayeri, Ctenobrycon hauxwellianus, and Pyrrhulina vittata.

=== Parasites ===
Astyanax bimaculatus is a host to various parasites that colonize different parts of the body. Creptotrema dissimilis is a species of trematode (flatworm) that inhabits the intestines. Magnivitellinum simplex, another intestinal trematode, was first described from A. bimaculatus in Brazil. Parasitic isopod Livoneca lazzari was also first described from A. bimaculatus, this time from the gill cavity. The parasites most likely to infect A. bimaculatus come from Monogenea, a class of parasitic flatworms, and infections are more common during the rainy seasons.

Eukaryotic microparasites of the genus Myxobolus have been found inhabiting the gill filaments of A. bimaculatus, but the disease it causes is asymptomatic for A. bimaculatus.

== Biology ==
Astyanax bimaculatus can reach up to 18 years of age.

=== Reproduction ===
Astyanax bimaculatus is capable of year-round reproduction, though they are less likely to be in an active reproductive or maturation state during May, June, and July. In times of scarcity, energy resources can be diverted from the bodily fat or from the liver to the gonads of female specimens; males do not use the same strategy. Males also demonstrate reproductive morphology considered to be more "primitive" in phylogeny, including how the sperm cells are formed and carried. The peak of the spawning period, while it may depend on location, has been recorded in January and February.

Female specimens exposed to a chemical signal called "conspecific alarm substance", released by other A. bimaculatus in stressful situations like a predator attack, ovulate earlier than those not exposed - but they only ovulate once, and the generated zygotes may not develop. In normal spawning conditions, larger females can lay larger numbers of eggs, simply because they have more space to carry them. The eggs of A. bimaculatus are weakly adhesive, and are laid in environments of low current.

Spawning has been achieved in captivity.

=== Role as bioindicator ===
Wastewater, animal pollutants, and pesticides can all have a negative impact on a given aquatic environment. Specifically, these factors may be genotoxic, which means that they can damage cell "building blocks" and lead to harmful mutations (such as cancer). A. bimaculatus can be used as a biological indicator (bioindicator) of pollutants that may be genotoxic, based upon the formation of micronuclei in the red blood cells. The presence of a micronucleus results from a chromosome or chromosome fragment that is not incorporated into a daughter nucleus during cell division, a sign of genotoxicity.

Enzymes from kidney, gill and brain tissues of A. bimaculatus can also be tested to measure environmental impact. The enzymes that are higher or lower depend on factors from the surrounding environment, such as low oxygen, so measurements therein can indicate changes in water parameters and various pollutants.

== Behavior ==
Astyanax bimaculatus is generally non-competitive and will make changes in its own behavior so that its niche is not interfered with by sympatric species; this includes environment usage and components of dietary intake. Generally, it swims in schools, which increases survival for many animal species that live in groups. Laboratory testing has introduced a caveat to this, however. It displays conspecific aggression when faced with the threat of an active, chasing predator. Because predators are known to target the weakest or most isolated of a group, purposefully wounding a group member gives the predator in question an easy target, which increases the survival chances of the others.

=== Presence and behavior in aquaria ===
Astyanax bimaculatus is kept in captivity both by hobbyists and by scientists. In hobbyist circles, A. bimaculatus is a species known to need ample swimming space, and should not be paired with more retiring fish given its "rambunctious" habits. Generally, however, it is non-aggressive.

Researchers have experimented with using lactic acid bacteria from the intestinal tract of A. bimaculatus as a probiotic supplement for captive fish. Preliminary laboratory results are promising. In turn, turmeric (Curcuma longa) has been shown to have positive histological effects on A. bimaculatus, resulting in decreased parasite activity. Various anesthetics have been tested for efficacy on A. bimaculatus, which can help reduce stress levels during aquacultural procedures in captivity. An organic compound called 2-phenoxyethanol, as well as the essential oils of tea trees (Melaleuca alternifolia) and African basil (Ocimum gratissimum), have all proven effective on captive specimens; such results can be used to inform similar tests on other captive fish to ensure welfare.

== Conservation status ==
Astyanax bimaculatus has been evaluated by the IUCN Red List as "Least Concern". There is almost no risk of it becoming endangered, as it is remarkably widespread and incredibly adaptable. The construction of hydroelectric dams in its native range, for example, has not depressed population numbers; in one study, populations from above and below a dam simply developed different morphological properties to cope with the changes in flow, environment, and food availability. Changes in accessible dietary components also do not impede A. bimaculatus populations, as they are prepared to take advantage of whatever food sources may be nearby, given opportunistic feeding habits.
