= Saxatilia semicincta =

Conservation status
- Least Concern (IUCN 3.1)

Scientific classification
- Kingdom: Animalia
- Phylum: Chordata
- Class: Actinopterygii
- Division: Teleostei
- Order: Cichliformes
- Family: Cichlidae
- Genus: Saxatilia
- Species: S. semicincta

Binomial name
- Saxatilia semicincta (Steindachner, 1892)

Synonyms
- Crenicichla clancularia Ploeg, 1991; Crenicichla semicincta Steindachner, 1892; Crenicichla saxatilis var. semicincta Steindachner, 1892

Species of fish

Saxatilia semicincta or Crenicichla semicincta is a species of cichlid native to South America. It is found in the Amazon River basin, specifically in the Madre de Dios River and Mamoré River drainages in Peru and Bolivia. This species reaches a standard length of 17.1 cm (6.7 in).
