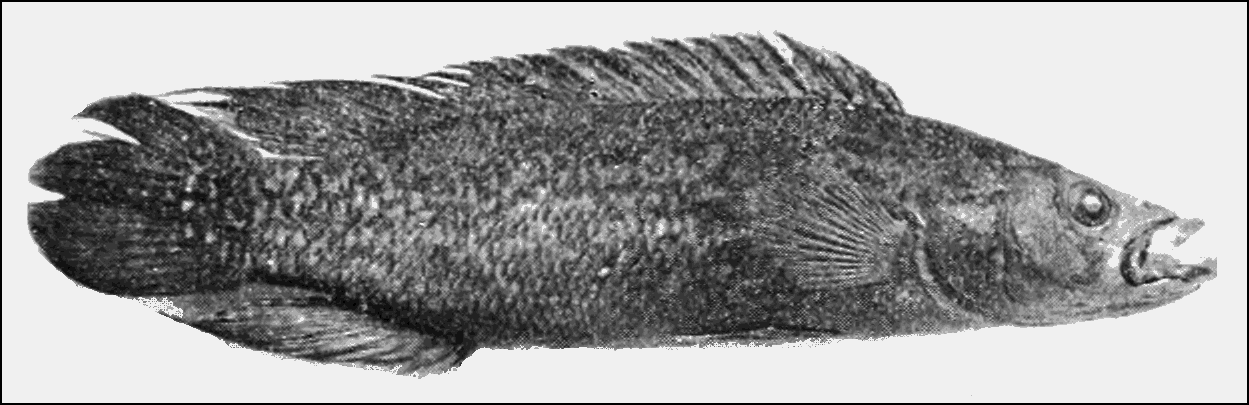

Conservation status
- Least Concern (IUCN 3.1)

Scientific classification
- Kingdom: Animalia
- Phylum: Chordata
- Class: Actinopterygii
- Order: Cichliformes
- Family: Cichlidae
- Genus: Saxatilia
- Species: S. saxatilis

Binomial name
- Saxatilia saxatilis (Linnaeus, 1758)

Synonyms
- Sparus saxatilis Linnaeus, 1758; Crenichla saxatilis (Linnaeus, 1758)

= Saxatilia saxatilis =

Species of fish

Saxatilia saxatilis, the ring tailed pike cichlid, is a species of cichlid native to South America. It is found swimming in the Atlantic coast drainages of Suriname, French Guiana, Guyana, Venezuela and Trinidad. This species reaches a length of 20 cm (7.9 in).

== Bibliography ==
- Kullander, S.O. and H. Nijssen, 1989. The cichlids of Surinam: Teleostei, Labroidei. E.J. Brill, Leiden, The Netherlands. 256 p.
