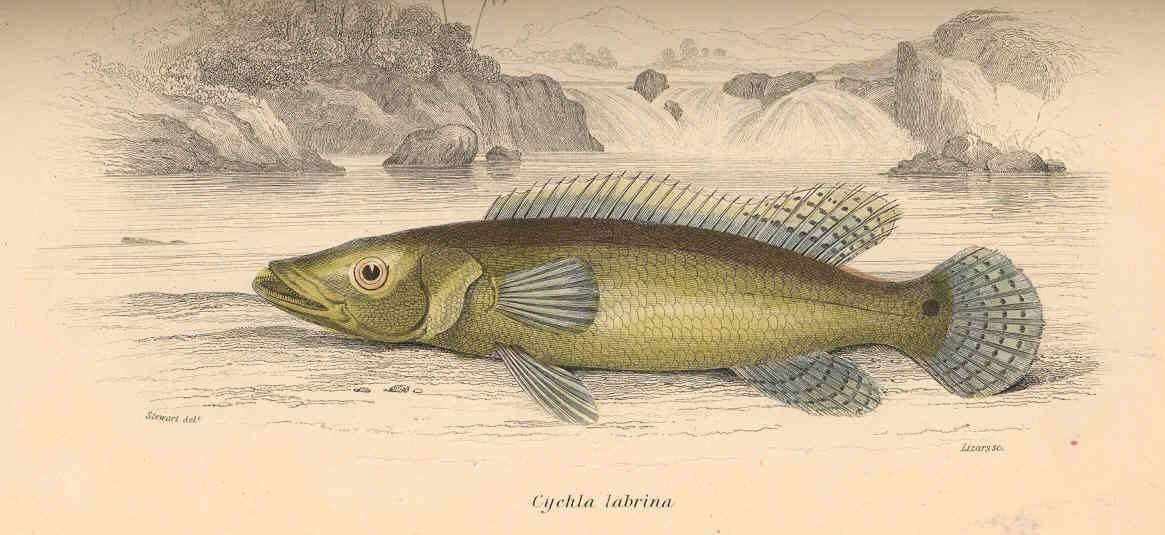

Conservation status
- Least Concern (IUCN 3.1)

Scientific classification
- Kingdom: Animalia
- Phylum: Chordata
- Class: Actinopterygii
- Order: Cichliformes
- Family: Cichlidae
- Genus: Saxatilia
- Species: S. labrina

Binomial name
- Saxatilia labrina (Spix & Agassiz, 1831)

Synonyms
- Cychla labrina; Crenicichla labrina

= Saxatilia labrina =

Species of fish

Saxatilia labrina is a species of cichlid native to South America. It is found in the Amazon River basin, in the lower Tocantins River basin. This species reaches a length of 16 cm (6.3 in).
