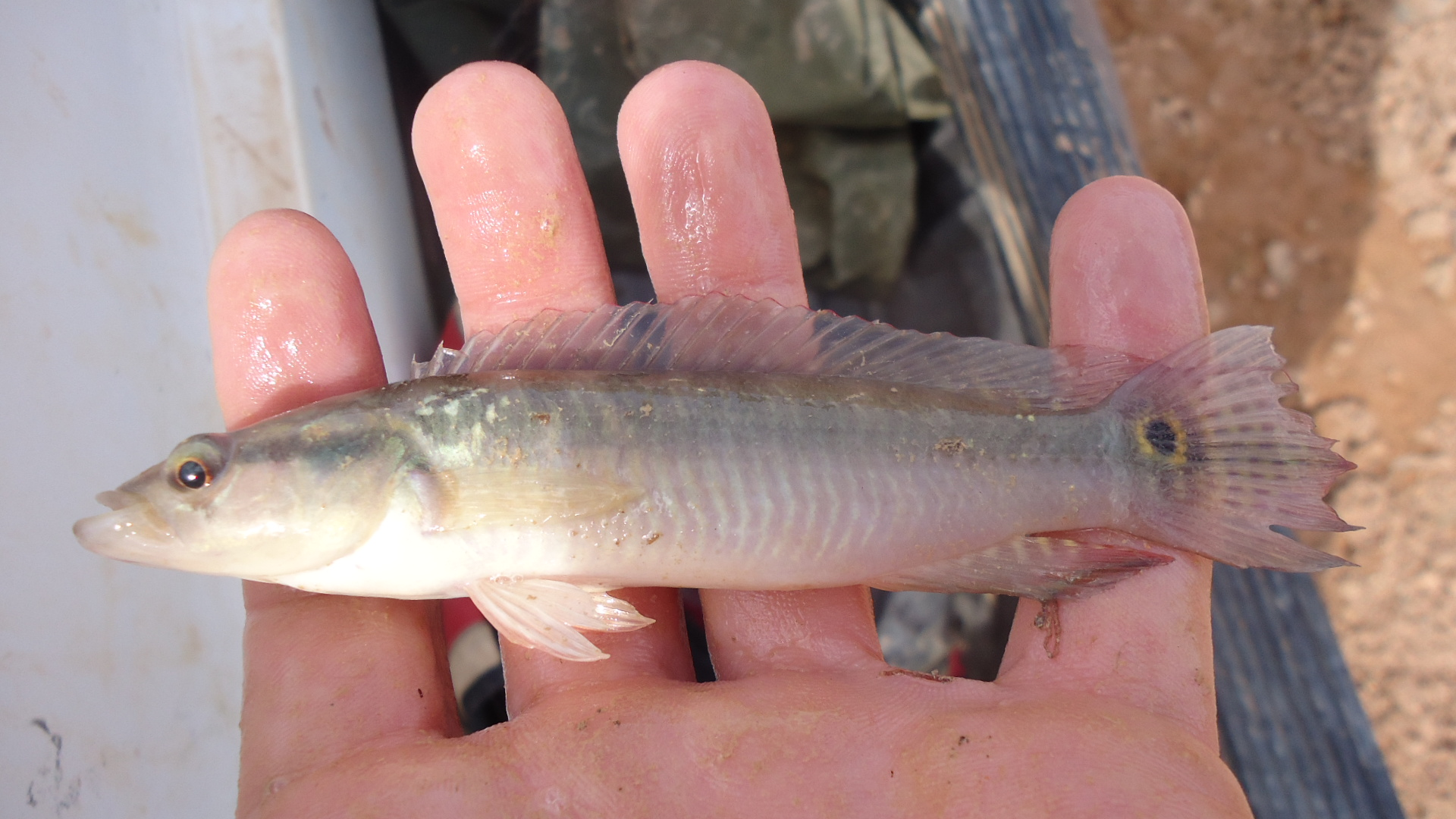

Conservation status
- Least Concern (IUCN 3.1)

Scientific classification
- Kingdom: Animalia
- Phylum: Chordata
- Class: Actinopterygii
- Order: Cichliformes
- Family: Cichlidae
- Genus: Saxatilia
- Species: S. brasiliensis

Binomial name
- Saxatilia brasiliensis (Bloch, 1792)

Synonyms
- Crenicichla brasiliensis (Bloch, 1792); Crenicichla menezesi Ploeg, 1991; Perca brasiliensis Bloch, 1792; Sparus nhoquunda Lacepède, 1802

= Saxatilia brasiliensis =

Species of fish

Saxatilia brasiliensis is a species of cichlid native to South America. It is found in the Ceará, Paraíba, Rio Grande do Norte and Pernambuco in Brazil. This species reaches a length of 7.8 cm (3.1 in).
