= Saxatilia proteus =

Conservation status
- Least Concern (IUCN 3.1)

Scientific classification
- Kingdom: Animalia
- Phylum: Chordata
- Class: Actinopterygii
- Order: Cichliformes
- Family: Cichlidae
- Genus: Saxatilia
- Species: S. proteus

Binomial name
- Saxatilia proteus (Cope, 1872)

Synonyms
- Batrachops nemopterus Fowler 1940; Crenicichla nijsseni Ploeg 1991; Crenicichla proteus Cope 1872; Crenicichla proteus var. argynnis Cope 1872

Species of fish

Saxatilia proteus is a species of cichlid native to South America. It is found in the Amazon river basin, in the Napo and Putumayo drainages in Ecuador, in the Ucayali-Amazon drainage from Chicosa to Pebas in Peru, and upper Purus basin. This species reaches a length of 15.5 cm (6.1 in).
