= Saxatilia lucius =

Conservation status
- Least Concern (IUCN 3.1)

Scientific classification
- Kingdom: Animalia
- Phylum: Chordata
- Class: Actinopterygii
- Order: Cichliformes
- Family: Cichlidae
- Genus: Saxatilia
- Species: S. lucius

Binomial name
- Saxatilia lucius Cope, 1870

Synonyms
- Crenicichla lucius

Species of fish

Saxatilia lucius is a species of cichlid native to South America. It is found in the Amazon River basin in Peru and western Brazil. This species reaches a length of 16.8 cm (6.6 in).
