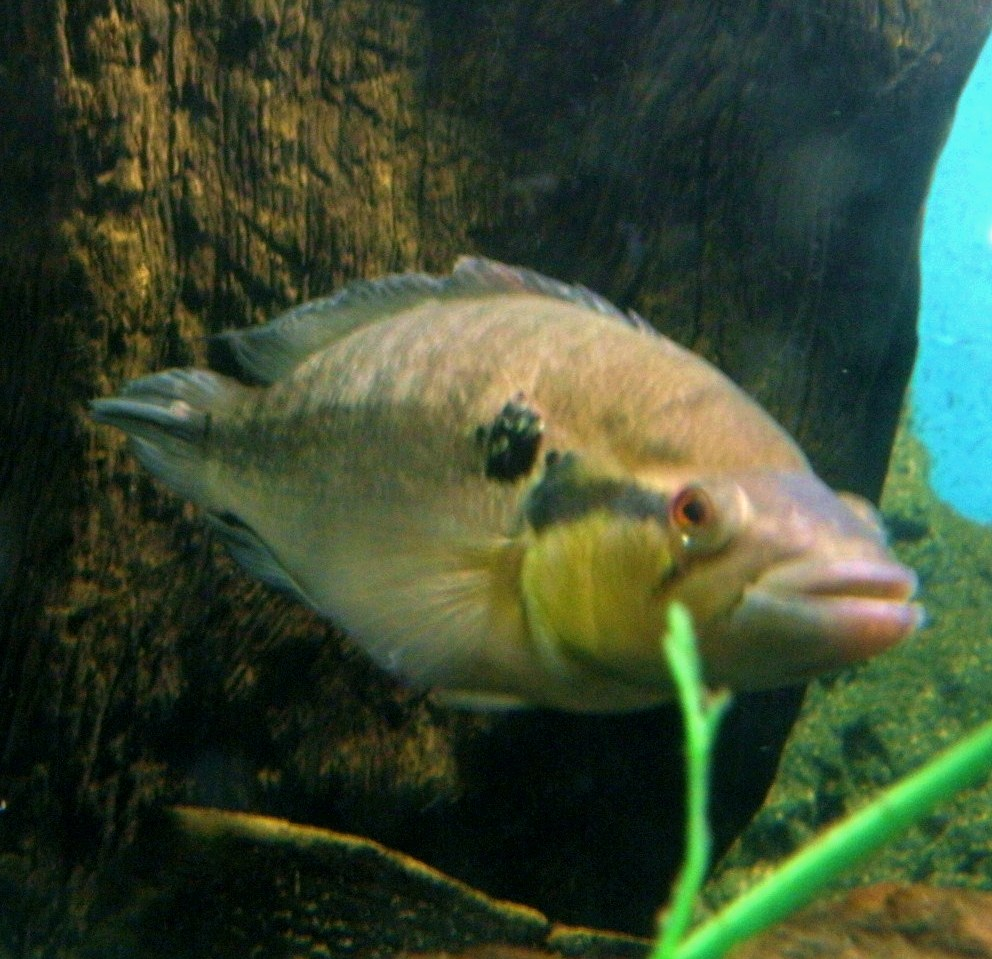

Conservation status
- Least Concern (IUCN 3.1)

Scientific classification
- Kingdom: Animalia
- Phylum: Chordata
- Class: Actinopterygii
- Order: Cichliformes
- Family: Cichlidae
- Genus: Saxatilia
- Species: S. lepidota

Binomial name
- Saxatilia lepidota (Heckel, 1840)

Synonyms
- Crenicichla lepidota

= Saxatilia lepidota =

Species of fish

Saxatilia lepidota is a species of cichlid native to South America. It is found in the Paraná River basin, it is widespread in the Paraguay River drainage in Brazil and Paraguay and the lower Paraná (below Guaira) in Paraguay and Argentina, and it is also along the coast of the Rio Grande do Sul, Brazil. Also found in the middle and lower Uruguay River in Brazil and Uruguay. Amazon River basin in the Guaporé River drainage in Brazil and Bolivia. This species reaches a length of 20.9 cm (8.2 in).
