= Saxatilia anthurus =

Conservation status
- Least Concern (IUCN 3.1)

Scientific classification
- Kingdom: Animalia
- Phylum: Chordata
- Class: Actinopterygii
- Order: Cichliformes
- Family: Cichlidae
- Genus: Saxatilia
- Species: S. anthurus

Binomial name
- Saxatilia anthurus (Cope, 1872)

Synonyms
- Crenicichla anthurus

Species of fish

Saxatilia anthurus is a species of cichlid native to South America. It is found in the Amazon River basin, in the Ucayali, Huallaga, Putumayo, Napo and Amazon River basins. This species reaches a length of 22.4 cm (8.8 in).
