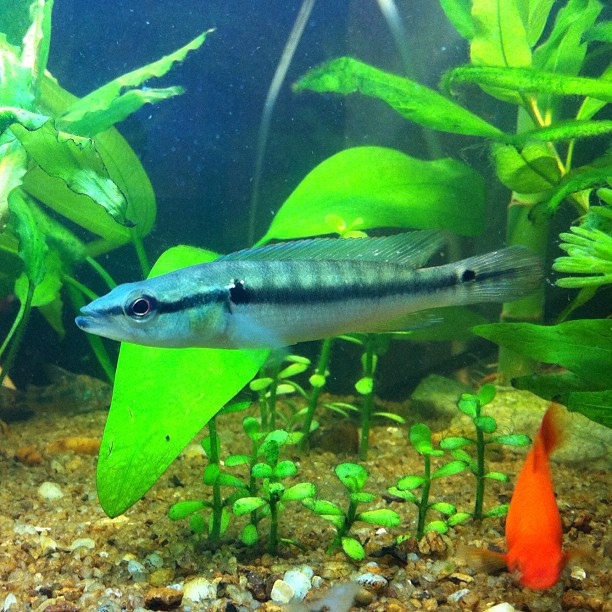

Conservation status
- Least Concern (IUCN 3.1)

Scientific classification
- Kingdom: Animalia
- Phylum: Chordata
- Class: Actinopterygii
- Order: Cichliformes
- Family: Cichlidae
- Genus: Saxatilia
- Species: S. albopunctata

Binomial name
- Saxatilia albopunctata Pellegrin, 1904

Synonyms
- Crenicichla albopunctata

= Saxatilia albopunctata =

Species of fish

Saxatilia albopunctata is a species of cichlid native to South America. It is found in the Approuague River in French Guiana to the Demerara River in Guyana. This species reaches a length of 14 cm (5.5 in).
