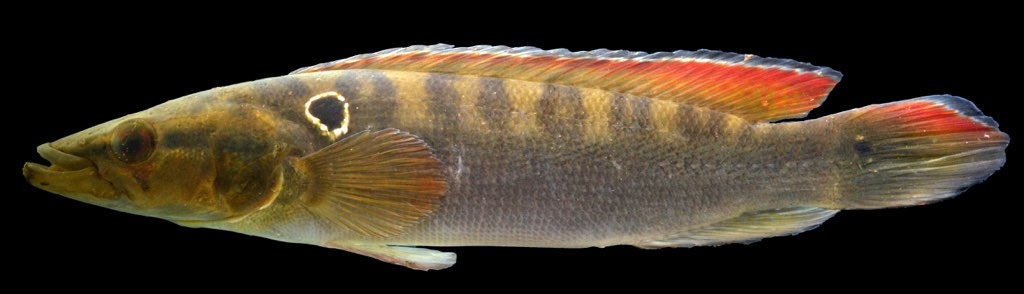

Conservation status
- Least Concern (IUCN 3.1)

Scientific classification
- Kingdom: Animalia
- Phylum: Chordata
- Class: Actinopterygii
- Order: Cichliformes
- Family: Cichlidae
- Genus: Saxatilia
- Species: S. alta

Binomial name
- Saxatilia alta (C. H. Eigenmann, 1912)

Synonyms
- Crenicichla alta Eigenmann, 1912; Crenicichla cardiostigma Ploeg, 1991; Crenicichla pterogramma Fowler, 1914; Crenicichla vaillanti Pellegrin, 1903

= Saxatilia alta =

Species of fish

Saxatilia alta is a species of cichlid native to South America. It is found in the Amazon River basin, in the Branco River basin, Brazil and the Essequibo River basin, Guyana. This species reaches a length of 16 cm (6.3 in).
