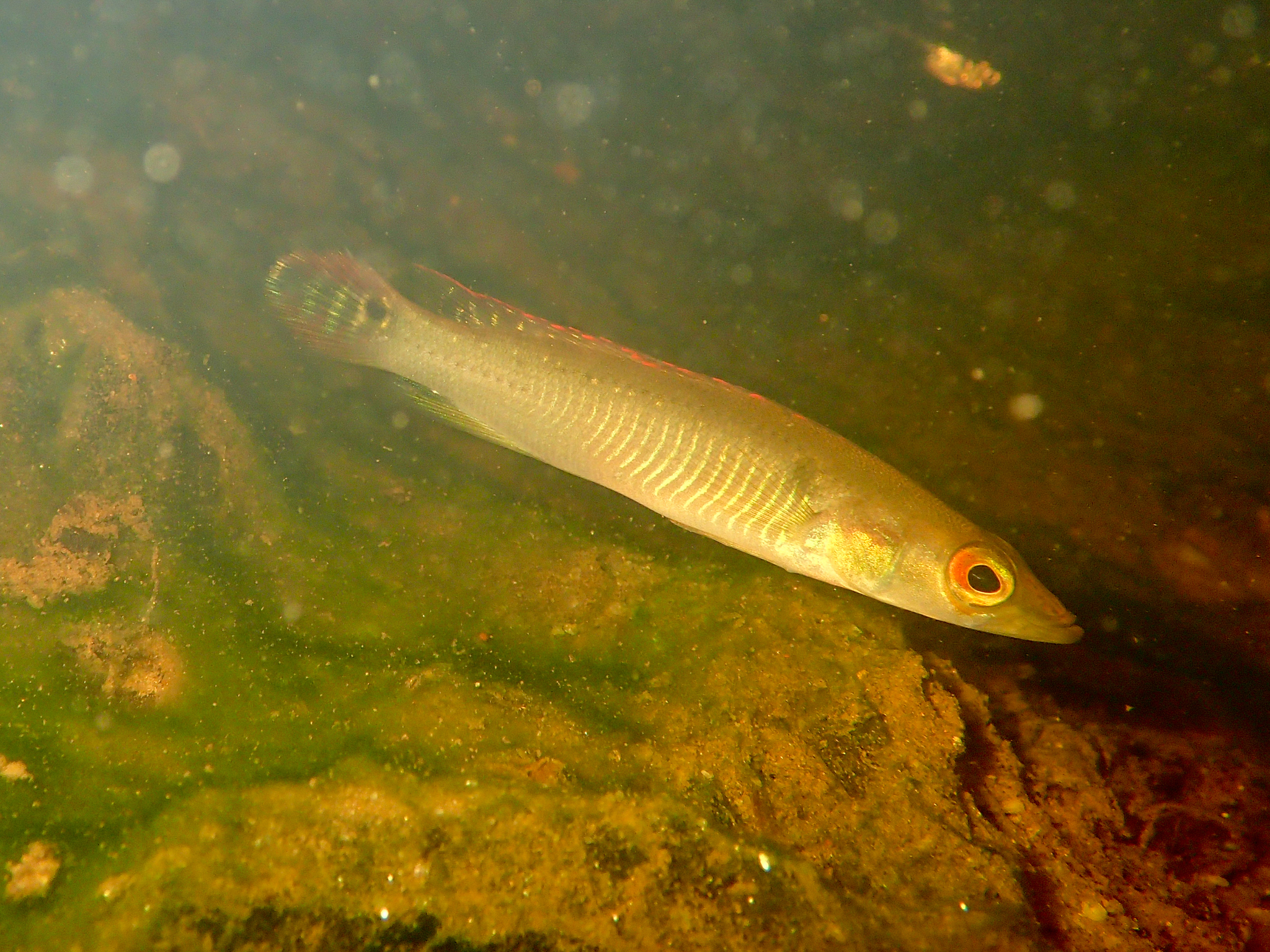
- Saxatilia saxatilis

Scientific classification
- Kingdom: Animalia
- Phylum: Chordata
- Class: Actinopterygii
- Order: Cichliformes
- Family: Cichlidae
- Subfamily: Cichlinae
- Tribe: Geophagini
- Genus: Saxatilia; Varella, Kullander, Menezes, López-Fernández & Oliveira, 2023

Type species
- Perca saxatilis Linnaeus, 1758

= Saxatilia =

Genus of fishes

Saxatilia is a South American cichlid genus in the genus group Geophagini. The genus was only erected in mid-2023 by four South American ichthyologists and their Swedish colleague Sven O. Kullander, and the name is a near-tautonym of the chosen type species. Previously, the species placed in Saxatilia belonged to the genus Crenicichla and formed the Crenicichla saxatilis species complex. Of all the genera of pike cichlids, Saxatilia has the widest distribution area. It occurs in the Amazon Basin, in the drainage basin of the Orinoco, in the entire river basin of the Río de la Plata, the Río Paraná and the Río Uruguay, in the coastal rivers of the Guyanas, on the islands of Trinidad and Tobago, in the coastal rivers of northeastern Brazil and in the lagoons Lagoa dos Patos and Lagoa Mirim in the south of Brazil.

== Characteristics ==
Like all pike cichlids, the Saxatilia species have an elongated body. Males and females of the Saxatilia species differ in colour. Males show an irregular pattern of small, light spots on the sides of their bodies; in females, the belly is reddish or purple and rounded. A characteristic feature of the genus is a dark spot above the base of the pectoral fin. This spot is present at any age. Most species of the genus Lugubria also have this humeral spot at the base of the pectoral fin. However, this only becomes visible in old age and is located in front of the pectoral fin rather than above it. Saxatilia differs from Hemeraia in the scaling of the sides of the body, which in Saxatilia consists predominantly of ctenoid scales, whereas in Hemeraia it is mainly cycloid scales. In contrast to Hemeraia and Teleocichla, in Saxatilia the infraorbitals 4 and 5 (bones below the eye socket) are not fused together. Compared to Lugubria, Saxatilia has more vertebrae (31–36 vs. 38–42). In Saxatilia the posterior edge of the supracleithrum, a bone in the shoulder girdle, is not serrated, whereas in Wallaciia it is serrated. Saxatilia differs from Crenicichla (subgenus Crenicichla) by the presence (or absence) of an eye spot on the caudal fin and by cycloid (vs. ctenoid) scales on the cheeks and chest area. Saxatilia differs from Crenicichla (subgenus Batrachops) by the absence of a reticulate colour pattern on the sides of the body. The visible difference between Saxatilia and Crenicichla (subgenus Lacustria) lies in the colouration of the under-eye region; in Saxatilia it is uniformly coloured, whereas in the subgenus Lacustria it is spotted.

== Species ==
The genus Saxatilia includes the following species:

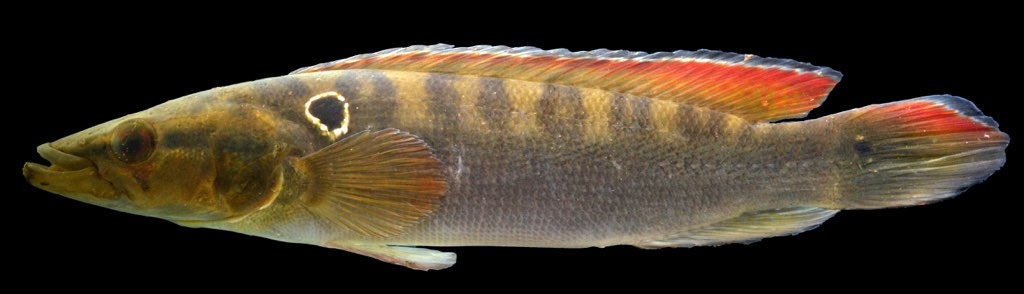
Saxatilia alta

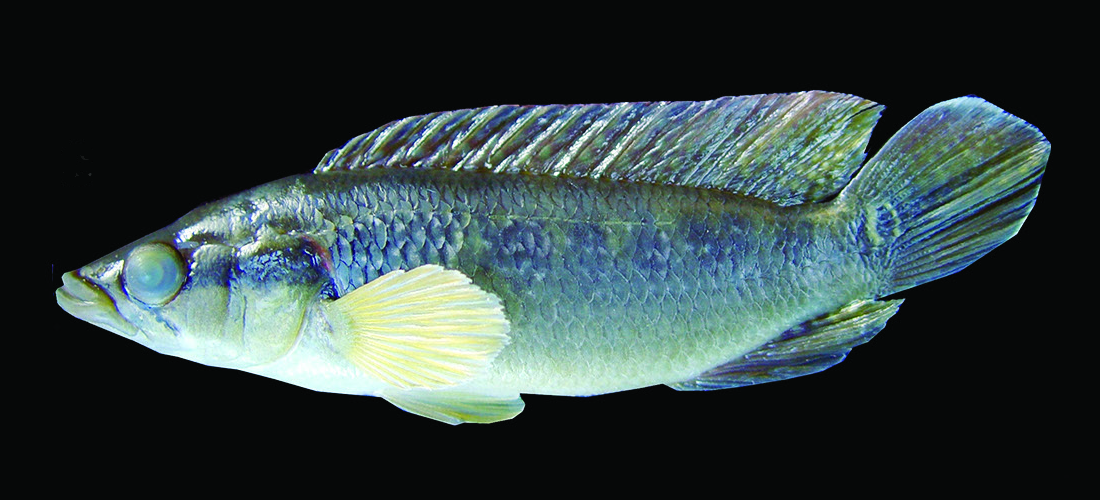
Saxatilis britskii

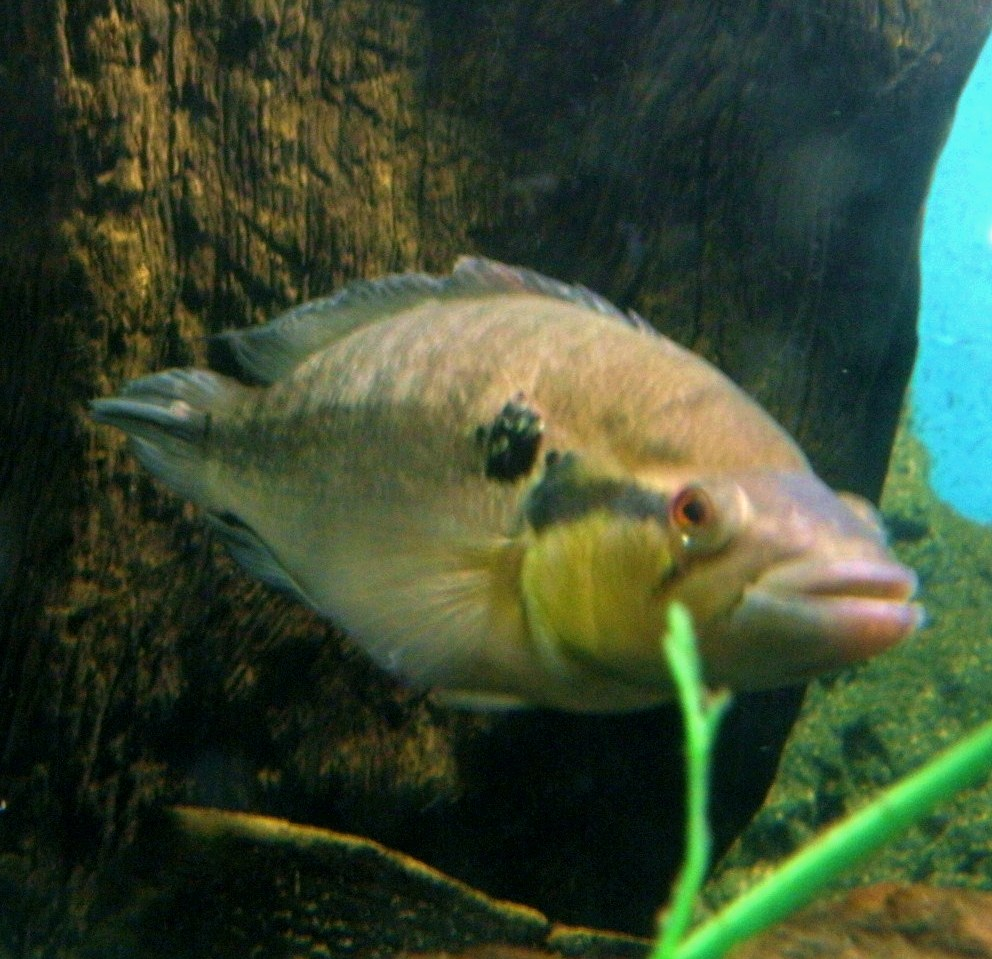
Saxatilia lepidota

- Saxatilia albopunctata (Pellegrin, 1904)
- Saxatilia alta (C. H. Eigenmann, 1912) (millet)
- Saxatilia anthurus (Cope, 1872)
- Saxatilia brasiliensis (Bloch, 1792)
- Saxatilia britskii (S. O. Kullander, 1982)
- Saxatilia coppenamensis (Ploeg, 1987)
- Saxatilia frenata (T. N. Gill, 1858)
- Saxatilia hummelincki (Ploeg, 1991)
- Saxatilia inpa (Ploeg, 1991)
- Saxatilia isbrueckeri (Ploeg, 1991)
- Saxatilia labrina (Spix & Agassiz, 1831)
- Saxatilia lepidota (Heckel, 1840) (pike cichlid)
- Saxatilia lucius (Cope, 1870)
- Saxatilia nickeriensis (Ploeg, 1987)
- Saxatilia pellegrini (Ploeg, 1991)
- Saxatilia ploegi (H. R. Varella, Loeb, F. C. T. Lima & S. O. Kullander, 2018)
- Saxatilia proteus (Cope, 1872)
- Saxatilia pydanielae (Ploeg, 1991)
- Saxatilia santosi (Ploeg, 1991)
- Saxatilia saxatilis (Linnaeus, 1758) (ring-tail pike cichlid)
- Saxatilia semicincta (Steindachner, 1892)
- Saxatilia sipaliwini (Ploeg, 1987)
- Saxatilia sveni (Ploeg, 1991)
