= Acatlán River =

Coordinates: 18.0822°N 98.3108°W

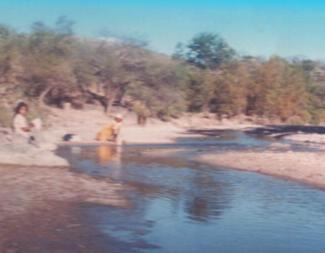

Location
- Country: Mexico

The Acatlán River is a river of Mexico.

== See also ==
- List of rivers of Mexico
