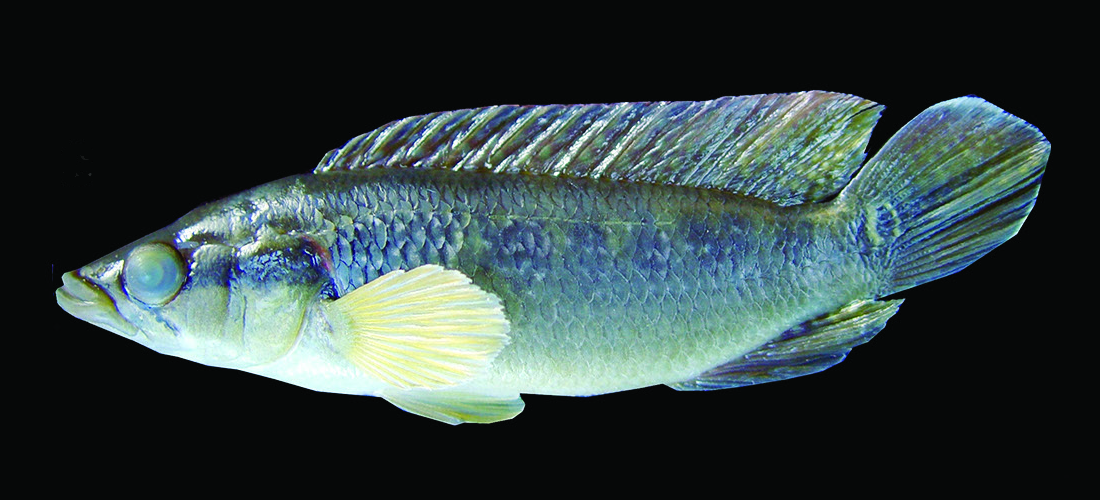

Conservation status
- Least Concern (IUCN 3.1)

Scientific classification
- Kingdom: Animalia
- Phylum: Chordata
- Class: Actinopterygii
- Order: Cichliformes
- Family: Cichlidae
- Genus: Saxatilia
- Species: S. britskii

Binomial name
- Saxatilia britskii (S. O. Kullander, 1982)

Synonyms
- Crenicichla britskii

= Saxatilia britskii =

Species of fish

Saxatilia britskii is a species of cichlid native to South America. It is found in the Paraná River basin, in the Paraná River drainage upstream from Guaira, Brazil. This species reaches a length of 14.5 cm (5.7 in).

The fish is named in honor of Heraldo A. Britski of the Universidade de São Paulo, for his help arranging excursions during Kullander's stay in São Paulo, which during the type specimen was collected.
