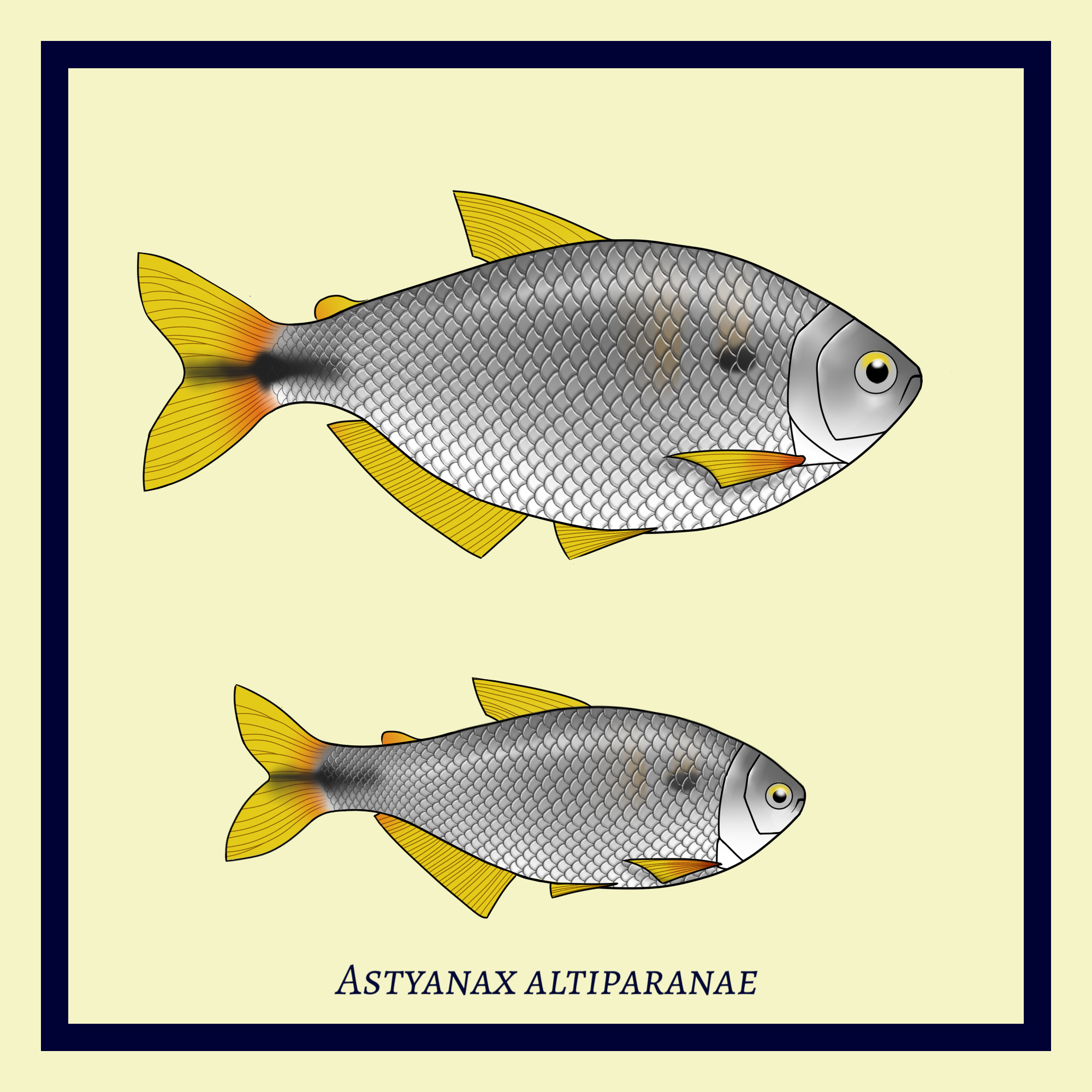
- Illustration of female and male Astyanax altiparanae

Conservation status
- Least Concern (IUCN 3.1)

Scientific classification
- Kingdom: Animalia
- Phylum: Chordata
- Class: Actinopterygii
- Division: Teleostei
- Order: Characiformes
- Family: Acestrorhamphidae
- Genus: Astyanax
- Species: A. altiparanae

Binomial name
- Astyanax altiparanae Garutti & Britski, 2000

= Astyanax altiparanae =

Species of fish

Astyanax altiparanae, sometimes called the yellow-tail tetra or yellow-tail lambari, is a species of schooling freshwater fish widely distributed across the southern half of South America. It is an ecologically flexible species, able to adapt to various resource and space conditions, and its diet follows this pattern; it is considered opportunistic and omnivorous. Its widespread nature and unspecified ecology contribute to its status as a species of least concern on the IUCN Red List. It was originally described from the upper Paraná river basin, which is the origin of its specific epithet; "alto" means "higher" in Brazilian Portuguese, hence "alto Paraná".

It matures early, reproduces quickly, and accepts laboratory conditions with ease, which makes it a good model organism. It can also be used as a living indicator for environmental conditions, as the composition of its scales often reflects the availability of different resources in its environment, and it responds to various pollutants in ways that can be easily measured. Because A. altiparanae can be kept in captivity with few problems, it has recently become a large part of the aquaculture scene in South America. It is used both for live bait and for human consumption, so farming both prevents overfishing of wild specimens and prevents introduction of exotic species for these purposes.

As a part of the Astyanax bimaculatus species complex, A. altiparanae is one of many species with unclear cladistic status in the genus Astyanax. Some researchers consider it synonymous with Astyanax lacustris, but there are various data that suggest the two should remain separate, including chromosomal, mitochondrial, and geographical. Studies of generic phylogeny are ongoing.

== Taxonomy ==
Astyanax altiparanae was first described in 2000 by Brazilian scientists Valdener Garutti and Heraldo A. Britski. They commented on its connection to Astyanax bimaculatus, which is at the center of a species complex to which A. altiparanae belongs, and to A. lacustris; in this context, A. lacustris was differentiated from A. altiparanae largely by geographical distribution. A. altiparanae was first described from the upper Paraná river basin.

Astyanax altiparanae and Astyanax lacustris are considered synonymous by some sources. The amount of morphological and meristic overlap raises questions about the validity of the two species as distinct entities. However, there is evidence to suggest that they may instead be sister species (two species that are more closely related to each other than to other members of the genus). Such diversification was likely driven by tectonic activity and fluctuations in sea level, which is something that stands for all members of Astyanax related to A. altiparanae; specifically, this is true for all species within the Astyanax bimaculatus species complex.

Astyanax altiparanae is considered a cryptic species - that is, a species more than likely made up of two or more species currently considered synonymous. Genetic evidence supports a possible second species within A. altiparanae's current definition; there are at least two distinct haplotypes, or sets of alleles clearly inherited from one lineage over another.

=== Etymology ===
The species name "altiparanae" is a Latinization of the Brazilian Portuguese word "alto", which means "high", and Paraná, in reference to the type locality of the species. The genus name "Astyanax" is an allusion to Homer's Iliad, referencing the Trojan prince of the same name; the reason for this was not made clear in the original text. One possibility is the large, armor-like scales of type species A. argentatus (which is now largely considered a synonym of A. mexicanus).

Common names most frequently used include "yellow-tail tetra" and "yellow-tail lambari", in reference to the bright yellow fins.

== Description ==
Astyanax altiparanae reaches a maximum of 16.4 cm (6.5 in) total length. Its maximum weight is 60 g. Its base body color is generally a dark silver, with bright-yellow fins, and the darker dorsal region fades into a whitish ventral region; when exposed to the stressful conditions of lowered water temperature, these colors darken to a dark-gray and more desaturated yellow. Markings include two brownish vertical bars in the humeral region, a black humeral spot shaped like a horizontal oval, and a black mark on the caudal peduncle that extends all the way to the edges of the median caudal rays. This is a pattern it shares with congener Astyanax bimaculatus, which is part of why A. altiparanae is considered a part of the A. bimaculatus species complex.

Astyanax altiparanae has an average of 12 dorsal-fin rays, 11 pectoral-fin rays, 9 pelvic-fin rays, 27 anal-fin rays, and 19 caudal-fin rays. It has 33–41 lateral-line scales, averaging 36. There are 7 scale rows above the lateral line, and 6 beneath it. The premaxilla sports 5 teeth. In specimens up to 60 mm, the dorsal-fin origin is behind the middle of the body, and in larger specimens, it is at the middle or in front of it. The lower half of the body (below the lateral line) is larger than the upper. The jaws are somewhat protractile.

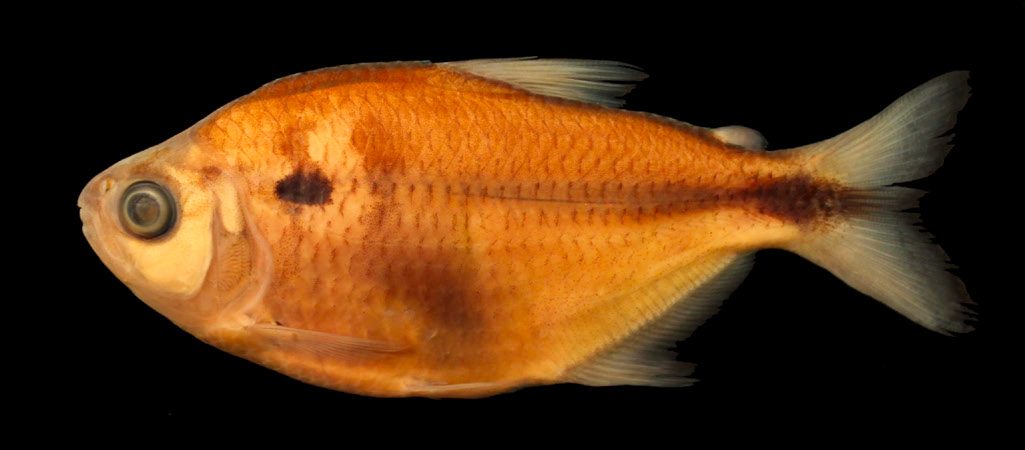
This preserved specimen is a female. The body would be more slender on a male.

=== Sexual dimorphism ===
Males above 48 mm demonstrate bony hooks or spines on the anal and ventral fins. These spines were originally thought to be an indicator of sexual maturity, but they have been observed in immature specimens, more frequently during the summer. Females also have more prominent bellies than males, and this is evident even in subadult specimens. Females are the larger of the two sexes.

== Distribution ==
Astyanax altiparanae can be found commonly in the Paraná and Iguaçu Rivers, but it inhabits most rivers in the southern half of South America. It was momentarily thought to be endemic to the upper Paraná basin, but this has since been disproved; A. altiparanae is an incredibly widespread species, thanks largely to its adaptability. This is something it shares with congener A. bimaculatus, and the two in combination are some of the most widely distributed fishes across the Neotropical region.

== Behavior ==
Astyanax altiparanae tends to occupy the upper portion of the water column, but this preference is only demonstrated in areas with ample space for groups to spread out. In smaller areas, the entire environment is used, indicating further adaptability to surroundings. When given the opportunity to form separate schools, larger individuals form schools of about 15 fish, and tend to occupy slightly deeper waters. Smaller individuals form larger schools of approximately 50 fish, and stay near the surface of the water; they more often occupy space near the riverbanks (especially when there is plentiful aquatic vegetation).

=== Diet and feeding ===
Astyanax altiparanae is a nektonic (group-dwelling) omnivore with the ability to adapt its diet to its environment. In comparison with many fish species, including several congeners, its flexible response to resource availability is notable. For instance, populations in larger rivers favor preying upon microcrustaceans, but populations in streams more often consume plant material. (The numerous gill rakers of A. altiparanae assist in retention of particulate or microscopic food.) The rainy season correlates with higher consumption of allochthonous material, especially at sites with ample riparian vegetation and especially in terms of arthropods. The intestinal tract of all Astyanax species has a thick muscle wall that likely helps protect against endoparasites.

In captive A. altiparanae, treatment with oregano oil has been shown to increase height, width, and increased surface area of intestinal folds. This may be due to oregano oil's antimicrobial properties, which could have reduced the relevant negative activity in the intestines; without the resource expenditure of replacing damaged cells therein, overall growth may have been improved. Oregano oil also increased the thickness of the intestinal muscular wall, likely for the same reason, and probably had indirect antiparasitic effects as a result.

== Trophic role ==
Astyanax altiparanae serves as an important part of the trophic web in various river basins throughout its range, largely because it serves as a food source for many piscivorous species therein. (Species from Astyanax as a whole, not just A. altiparanae, fill this role in many South American regions.) Specific predators of A. altiparanae include Salminus hilarii and Hoplias malabaricus, which rely heavily upon it in the Corrente River, as well as characid species Acestrorhynchus lacustris. It is subject to parasitic infestation in the gills and face by the copepod Lernaea cyprinacea, as well as at least fifteen species of metazoan parasites.

Humans are amongst further predators of A. altiparanae, but should exercise caution; pollutants, especially of a class called Persistent Organic Pollutants (POPs), accumulate in various bodily tissues, and can be transferred to consumers.

=== Role as a bioindicator ===
Given its widespread nature and general adaptability, A. altiparanae is an ideal species to use as a bioindicator for various aspects of ecosystem health. This is especially the case given the fact that it can change its diet to fit its surroundings, and its physiological response therefore reflects the health and primary food sources it utilizes within said environment. The composition of the scales draws upon such factors, which is a source of clear data regarding the origin of individual specimens. (Scale composition as a result of environmental factors can also influence phenotypic characteristics.)

Astyanax altiparanae can be used as a bioindicator of zinc contamination given that its physiological response can be easily monitored through blood tests. While zinc is an essential component for life, excess zinc serves as a genotoxin, and this manifests in A. altiparanae in the form of micronuclei in the red blood cells (erythrocytes). The presence of a micronucleus results from a chromosome (or chromosome fragment) that is not carried into one of the nuclei that forms during cell division, essentially being "left behind"; this is a flag for genotoxic influence and chromosomal instability.

Copper is another metal that, in high concentrations, damages the DNA of A. altiparanae, and it also accumulates in various tissues and systems throughout the body. As such, A. altiparanae can also be used to measure copper toxicity in a given environment, especially given that other fish species appear to react less adversely. Furthermore, copper can travel up the trophic chain, which results in long-lasting genotoxic effects for any species that regularly prey upon A. altiparanae. This was specifically tested in species Hoplias malabaricus, a predatory characiform fish sometimes called the trahira.

Other metals that A. altiparanae can measure include aluminum, iron, manganese, chromium, cadmium, and nickel. A. altiparanae, if exposed to adverse conditions (such as water from sites demonstrating such metal contamination), can be used as an indicator of genotoxic events. Upon early research (yet unreviewed), various types of textile dyes were also discovered to have apparent genotoxic effects upon A. altiparanae, which broadens the range of contaminants it can signal. Dye toxicity was evaluated by the presence of chromosomal breaks, as well as changes in the distribution and quantity of constitutive heterochromatin. (Constitutive heterochromatin domains are specific regions of DNA in the chromosomes.)

Outside of genotoxicity, A. altiparanae can also signal the presence of pesticide contamination; specifically, this regards the compound atrazine, which is one of the most widely used pesticides in commercial farming. A. altiparanae responds to atrazine with oxidative stress and histological symptoms (microscopic tissue damage) in various bodily systems.

== Biology ==
Astyanax altiparanae has been recently, and strongly, considered for status as a model organism - that is, a species upon which various tests can be performed in laboratory conditions, yielding data and techniques that go on to be useful in related research. Several aspects make it useful therein. These include its small size, its ready acceptance of captivity, an early sexual maturation, an easily managed reproductive cycle, and external sexual dimorphism. It is also readily available from the commercial market, which makes it easy to obtain and therefore experiment with, as long as natural environmental conditions are not being taken into consideration.

=== Genetics ===
Astyanax altiparanae is one of multiple fish species for which the chromosome number is 2n = 50, though this number does vary within the genus; for instance, in Astyanax schubarti, it is 2n = 36. (Humans have a chromosome number of 2n = 46.) A. altiparanae is a chromosomally diverse species, with 22 described cytotypes. (A cytotype is a set of genetic characteristics that include karyotype, the general morphology of the chromosomes, and mitochondrial DNA, information encoded within a specific DNA cluster found in the mitochondria - rather than the nucleus - of a cell.) For instance, the karyotype formulae differ in populations of A. altiparanae depending on location; this has been documented specifically in populations of the upper Tibagi river and of the upper Iguaçu river.

The average size of the mitochondrial genome for A. altiparanae is estimated to be 16.0 kb. Study of the mitogenome of A. altiparanae supports its species status, as opposed to a junior synonym of A. lacustris. Similarities in mitochondrial DNA between two separate populations of A. altiparanae helped to broaden its range in the early years of its discovery and study.

=== Reproduction and induced sterility ===
For juvenile A. altiparanae, there is little parental care, and adults do not form dedicated pairs. Spawning occurs in the stretch from September to March, which encompasses the rainy season of the year, and happens in batches. The genus Astyanax demonstrates variation in spawning tactics, with several species using batch spawning and others total spawning (laying all eggs at one time); there is evidence to suggest that environmental factors could induce one or the other. A reproductive peak for A. altiparanae occurs between October and February. Higher reproduction rates in the rainy season can possibly be explained by an increase in food availability; specifically, A. altiparanae would be feeding upon allochthonous material washed in from the surrounding environment. The eggs of this species are adhesive.

Astyanax altiparanae has been considered for surrogate propagation, a process that allows animals to produce gametes from another species, which would be used in the conservation of endangered relatives. For this process, sterile specimens of A. altiparanae are needed so that none of the host's genes interfere with exogenous production. One method to ensure sterility is to obtain triploid specimens (as opposed to haploid, which is standard). Acute heat exposure is a method of triploidization that arose after experiments using chronic heat exposure to the same ends were unsuccessful. Another method, considered more reliable for continued production, is to breed tetraploid females and haploid males, which results in triploid offspring.

=== Presence and behavior in aquaria ===
Astyanax altiparanae is known to adapt readily to aquarium and laboratory environments, which contributes to its recent status as a model organism. This includes ease of diet management; for instance, A. altiparanae demonstrates no favor towards one source of lipids over another (e.g. vegetable vs. animal fat sources), which means any source could be reliably used to fulfill that dietary need. It is already a large part of aquaculture in South America because it can be used for various purposes, such as food or live bait, and a high production of captive specimens reduces the risk of overfishing. It also helps decrease the risk of invasive species introduction; if there a native species readily available for relevant purposes, exotic species are unlikely to be introduced into the niche.

A hormonal treatment called Carp Pituitary Extract (CPE) has been proven as a way to increase reproduction rates in captive female specimens. Female specimens are generally considered more advantageous for aquaculture purposes because they are larger and grow more quickly; as such, methods for producing more females than males have been tested. One method with a high success rate is treating larvae with estradiol valerate, which has produced batches of fish that are 70-76% female in laboratory conditions, as opposed to a control group of 44% female.

Experiments with A. altiparanae have been conducted for stress reduction in situations of air exposure, which is common in various captivity scenarios, such as aquaculture or sport-fishing; clove oil in a low concentration was found to be one potential stress management technique for the improvement of animal welfare. A. altiparanae also tolerates limited salinity, which can be used to mitigate stress responses as well; in some fish species, blood glucose rises upon agitation, possibly to prepare the animal for a fight-or-flight scenario. Salt in water has been shown to temper this response in A. altiparanae.

== Conservation status ==
Astyanax altiparanae is considered a species of least concern by the IUCN. Given its wide range, high population numbers, and adaptability, there are no factors that pose an imminent threat to its conservation status. This is positive for various aspects of the regions it inhabits, partially due to its important role in a low tier on the food chain, serving as a source for various piscivores. Efforts to ensure A. altiparanae's continued success should take the health of riparian vegetation into consideration, as allochthonous material makes up a great deal of its diet in regions without adequate waterborne resources.
