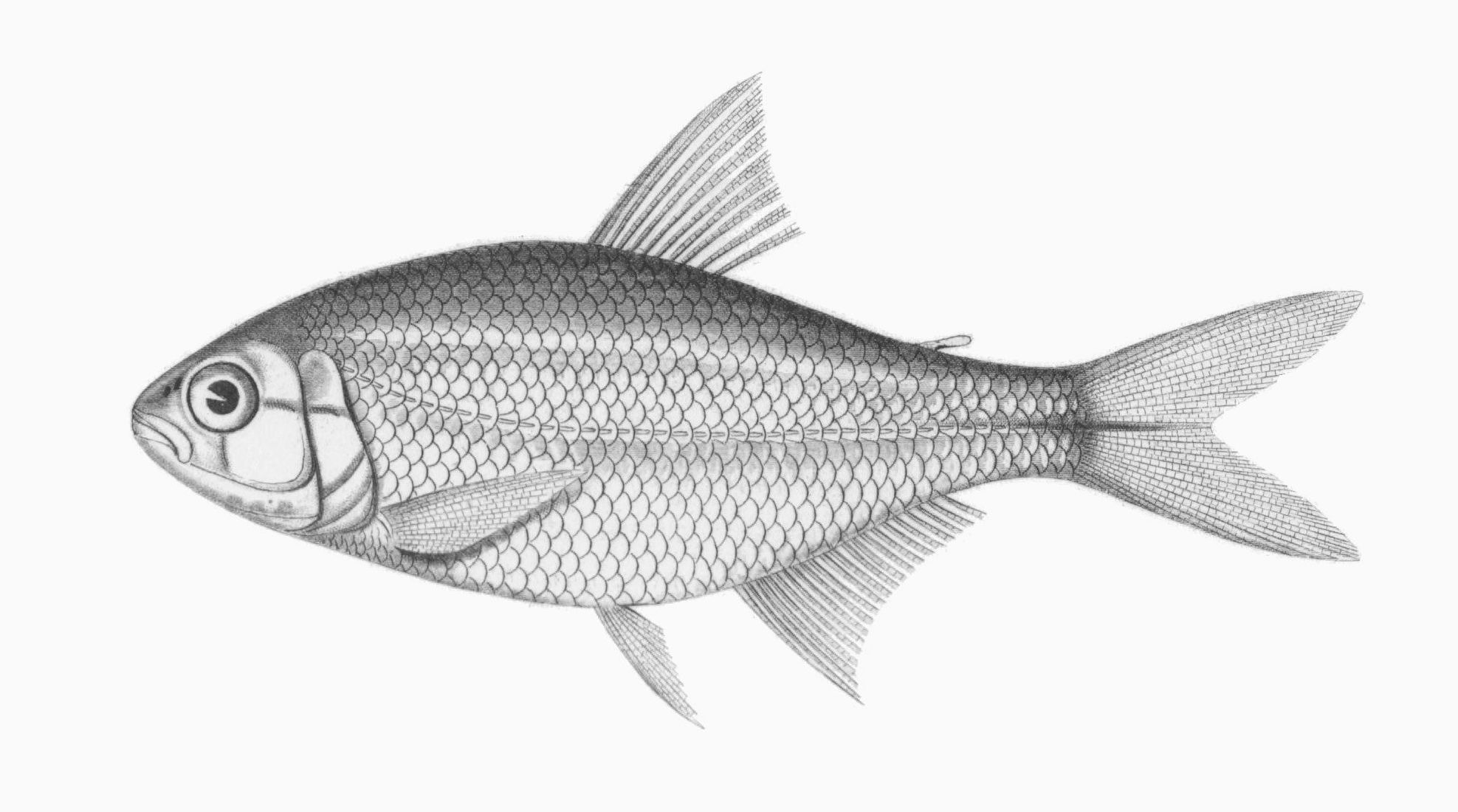
- 1859 illustration

Conservation status
- Least Concern (IUCN 3.1)

Scientific classification
- Kingdom: Animalia
- Phylum: Chordata
- Class: Actinopterygii
- Order: Characiformes
- Family: Acestrorhamphidae
- Genus: Astyanax
- Species: A. argentatus

Binomial name
- Astyanax argentatus Baird & Girard, 1854

= Astyanax argentatus =

Species of fish

Astyanax argentatus is a species of freshwater ray-finned fish belonging to the family Acestrorhamphidae, the American characins. This fish is found in northern Central America and southern North America. Given its native range, it is also known as the Texan tetra. Little has been published regarding the feeding habits or behavior of A. argentatus, but it is known to have the northernmost distribution of any member of the genus Astyanax.

There is debate regarding its status as a species, as it was considered a synonym of the Mexican tetra (A. mexicanus) for 20 years, but it has recently come back into favor as its own distinct entity. Various morphological specifics indicate their separation, though some resources still consider them synonymous. It also has visual similarities to various other members of the genus; its silver scales, single humeral spot, and yellowish or reddish fins are not uncommon features therein.

== Taxonomy ==
Astyanax argentatus was originally the type species of the genus Astyanax, proposed by American scientists Spencer F. Baird and Charles Girard in 1854. In a period from 1900 to roughly 1920, it was momentarily renamed to Tetragonopterus argentatus, and briefly synonymized with Tetragonopterus mexicanus (which is now Astyanax mexicanus). By 1921, ichthyologist Carl H. Eigenmann had undone this, then synonymized two genera under Astyanax - Poecilurichthys and Zygogaster - and labeled them as subgenera; these are still considered valid, along with subgenus Astyanax itself. In its 2017 redescription, A. argentatus was designated a member of subgenus Astyanax, based on a complete predorsal series of scales.

Astyanax is a large and speciose genus that is unlikely to be monophyletic - that is, there is probably more than one distinct lineage in the group, as opposed to a single lineage with a single shared ancestor. There are two currently proposed clades. One is the Astyanax bimaculatus clade, which is itself unlikely to be monophyletic. The other is the Astyanax argentatus clade, which includes A. argentatus itself and the majority of Central and North American congeners, suggesting a closer relationship between the species therein than to others of the genus. This clade is noted as well-supported across various phyletic analyses.

There is ongoing debate as to whether or not A. argentatus should be considered synonymous with congener A. mexicanus. Scientists from 1997 to 2017 marked the two as identical in the phyletic sense. Sources such as the World Register of Marine Species and OBIS still consider the two synonymous, while others cite A. argentatus as valid on its own, such as Eschmeyer's Catalog of Fishes and FishBase, the IUCN, and the Harvard Museum of Comparative Zoology. Amongst the institutions including it as valid is the University of Texas, located in the state from whence A. argentatus was originally described.

=== Etymology ===
Though the meaning of the scientific name of A. argentatus is understood, the precise reason for such nomenclature was not made clear in the original text. The specific epithet "argentatus", meaning "silver", is almost certainly a simple reference to the large, silvery scales; the genus name "Astyanax" is from Homer's Iliad, wherein Astyanax was a Trojan warrior, the son of prince Hector. Why this name was chosen is a mystery, but it may again originate in the scales, which could be compared to armor or a shield.

Because of its type locality and its native range, A. argentatus is sometimes colloquially referred to as the Texan tetra.

== Description ==
Astyanax argentatus reaches a maximum length of 11.4 cm (4.5 in) standard length (SL). The body is slender, at a mean of 34% SL, and there are between 19 and 23 anal-fin rays, most often 20. There are 10 soft rays in the dorsal fin, and 11–13 rays in each pectoral fin. The head is short, from 23–26% SL, and the eye is large, taking up around a quarter of the head (16–34% of the head's length, with a mean of 28%). There are 32–37 scales in the lateral line, usually 33. The caudal and anal fins are notably long.

The back is darker than the rest of the body, the sides are silver, and the belly is tinted slightly red. Most fins are a faint orange or red-yellow color, and there is a black spot on the caudal peduncle that continues onto the central caudal rays. The anal fin is unpigmented. There is a single humeral spot that demonstrates variation; it can be rectangular, triangular, or indistinct.

Though A. argentatus is visually similar to congener A. mexicanus (the Mexican tetra) in many ways, there are various morphometric differences between the two. These include fewer anal-fin rays in A. argentatus (21–25, modally 23 in A. mexicanus), a more slender body (37% SL in A. mexicanus), and a longer anal fin (14% SL or longer, mean 16% in A. argentatus, vs. 15% SL or shorter, mean 13% in A. mexicanus).

=== Sexual Dimorphism ===
On the anal-fin rays of mature males, there are small fleshy protrusions or spines sometimes referred to as nuptial tubercles. In other species of the genus, these are present in different ways; for instance, on Astyanax acatlanensis, some of these tubercles are bifid (vs. all simple in A. argentatus), and they are only present on the pelvic fin of Astyanax rioverde.

== Distribution and ecology ==
The type locality of A. argentatus was reported as the upper tributaries of the Nueces River, in the U.S. state of Texas. Further specimens have been collected from Aramberri, a municipality in the Mexican state of Nuevo León. It remains the northernmost species within the genus Astyanax. It has been described as "a Nearctic representative of a Neotropical clade".

The Nueces River is in a region of low rainfall, but it is fed by various springs and aquifers, which means that it is largely composed of clear and cool water. The riparian vegetation of the region is healthy; little is known about the feeding habits of A. argentatus, but other members of Astyanax near robust riparian zones feed on the resulting plentiful allochthonous material, and are otherwise flexible omnivores.

== Conservation status ==
The IUCN considers A. argentatus a species of least concern. Despite a fragmented population, it is often one of the most frequent species when it is present at surveyed sites, and appears to be adaptable enough for high survivability.

Though the species itself is healthy, some of the habitats of A. argentatus are at minor risk due to human recreational use; for instance, small-scale pollution from nearby hiking trails and campgrounds affects the Nueces River. However, protections have been passed to prevent the usage of personal vehicles, such as ATVs, in various areas relevant to the watershed, which shields the riparian zone and prevents contamination from fuel and exhaust fumes.
