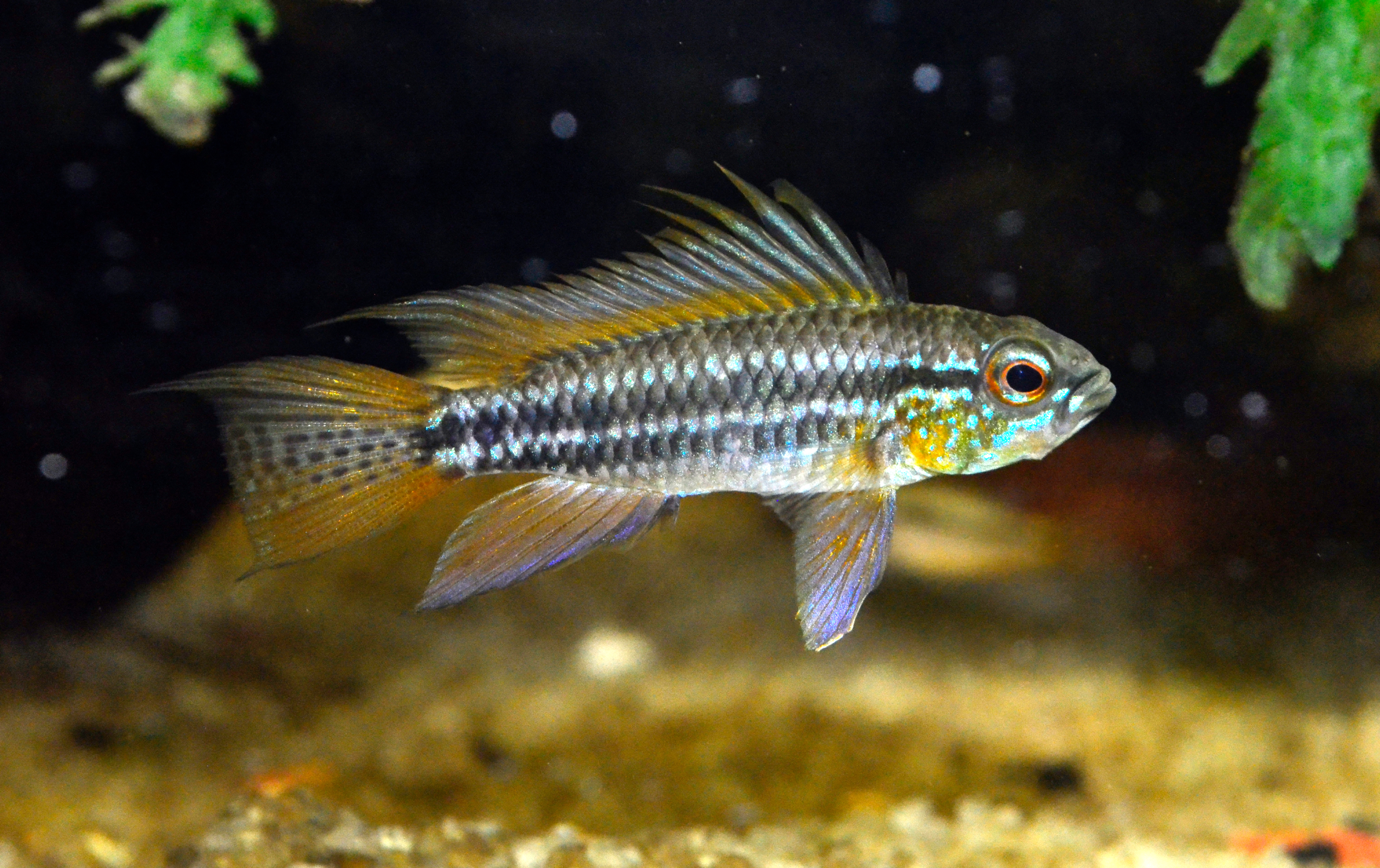
- Apistogramma bitaeniata
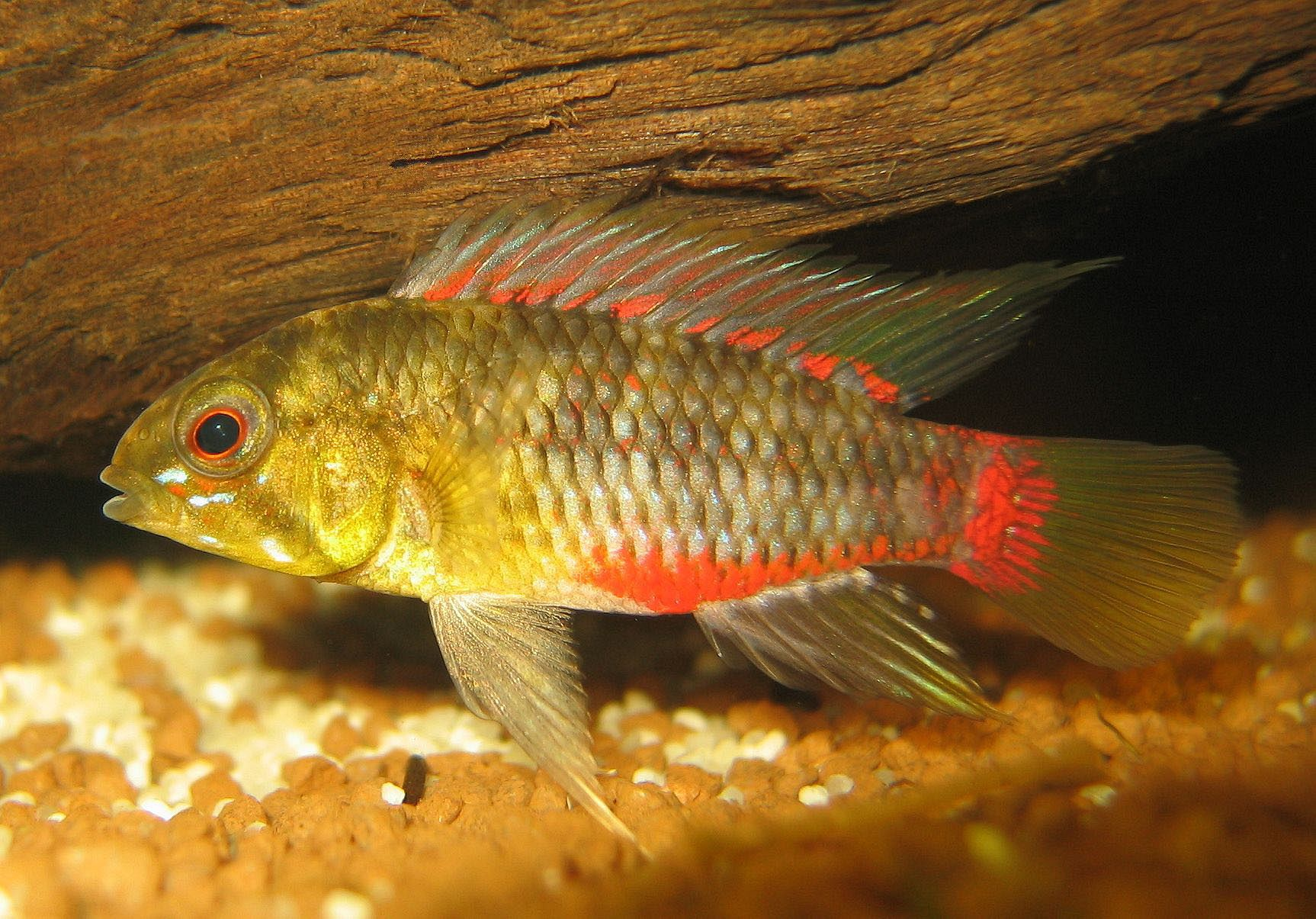
- Apistogramma hongsloi

Scientific classification
- Kingdom: Animalia
- Phylum: Chordata
- Class: Actinopterygii
- Division: Teleostei
- Order: Cichliformes
- Family: Cichlidae
- Subfamily: Cichlinae
- Tribe: Geophagini
- Subtribe: Geophagina
- Genus: Apistogramma; Regan, 1913

Type species
- Mesops taeniatus Günther, 1862

Synonyms
- Heterogramma Regan, 1906; Pintoichthys Fowler, 1954

= Apistogramma =

Genus of fishes

Apistogramma is a large genus of freshwater fish in the family Cichlidae native to South America, but also commonly kept in aquariums. They are dwarf cichlids that mostly feed on tiny animals and have breeding behaviors that vary depending on the exact species.

== Range, conservation status and habitat ==
Apistogramma are exclusively found in tropical and subtropical South America in the lowlands east of the Andes. The highest richness is in the western Amazon Basin and Orinoco Basin, but there are also species in the Guianan Shield, eastern Amazon Basin, rivers flowing into the Atlantic in northern Brazil (Tocantins–Araguaia to Parnaíba) and the Río de la Plata Basin. Although a few species are widespread, most members of this genus have small ranges. Few members of the genus have been evaluated by the IUCN, mostly either ranking as least concern (not threatened) or data deficient (limited available data prevents an evaluation), but some of the highly localized Apistogramma species likely are threatened. Primary threats to their survival are deforestation (causing changes in their microhabitat) and pollution (for example by oil drilling or mining).

Apistogramma generally inhabit streams, or edges of rivers or lakes. Most prefer sheltered habitats with leaf litter on the bottom in water with little movement and a shallow depth, up to about 40 cm (1.3 ft), although a few species occur deeper, in fast-flowing water, in more open habitats or at the surface among floating plants.

== Appearance ==
Apistogramma are dwarf cichlids with adults reaching between 2 and 8 cm (0.8–3.1 in) in standard length depending on species. Most species are strongly sexually dimorphic, with males generally larger than females and possessing different color patterns than the females (which at least when breeding are most frequently yellow with blackish markings); in a few species this pattern is reversed or the sexes are rather similar. Additionally, they often change color depending on behavior, for example when looking for food, breeding or during aggressive encounters. A few species, including A. agassizii, A. cacatuoides, A hongsloi and A. macmasteri, have been selectively bred by aquarists to achieve brighter colors than the natural, wild forms.

== Behavior ==
Apistogramma are omnivores, but tending towards micropredatory. Their main food items consist of aquatic insect larvae and other small invertebrates, fish fry, algae and plant debris.

Brood care is highly developed, as in most cichlids. Nearly all Apistogramma species spawn in crevices (small caves), typically in holes in sunken logs or branches, or in leaf litter aggregations. A number of breeding strategies exist in the genus. Some species breed in polygamous harems, while other species form monogamous pairs. Three of the described species, A. barlowi, A. megastoma and A. pantalone, practice mouthbrooding, either by both parents or only by the female. In most cases, regardless of the breeding strategy, the female is more highly involved with care of the eggs and fry, whilst the male defends a territory from predators. The sex of the fry is affected by the water conditions: In all species where it has been studied warmer water results in more males and in some species more acidic water (lower pH) also results in more males.

== Taxonomy and species ==
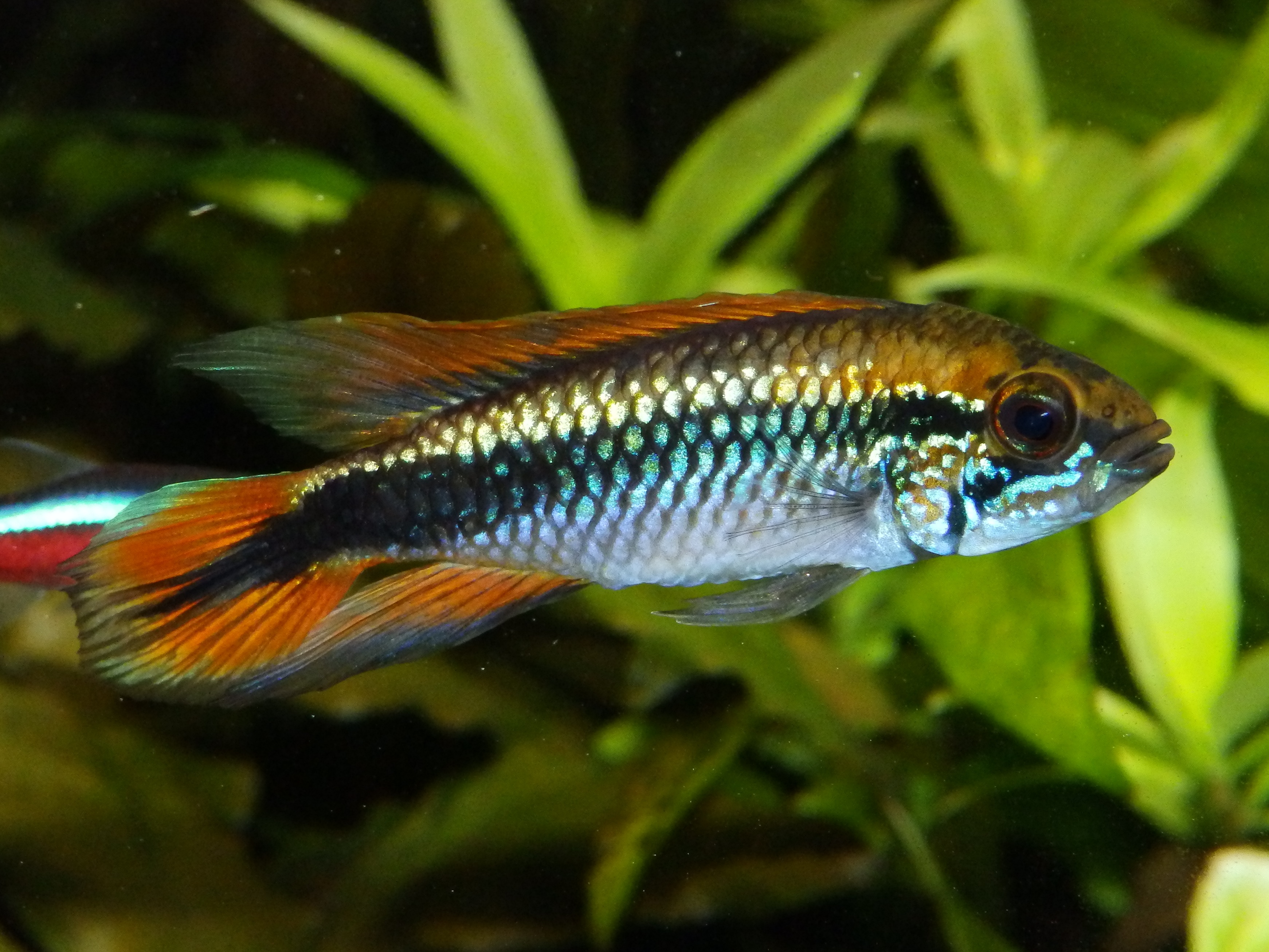
Apistogramma agassizii, male

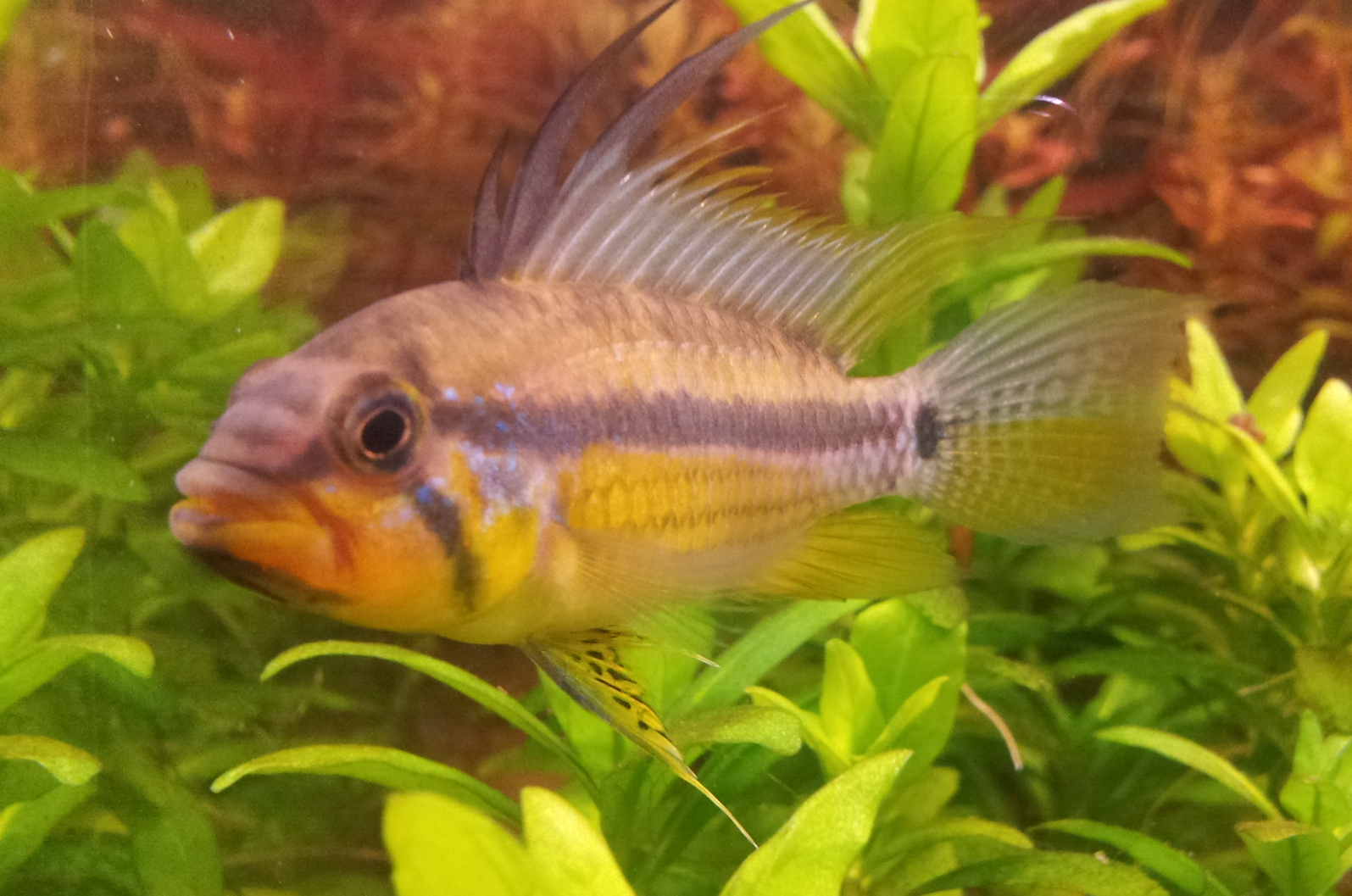
Apistogramma allpahuayo, male

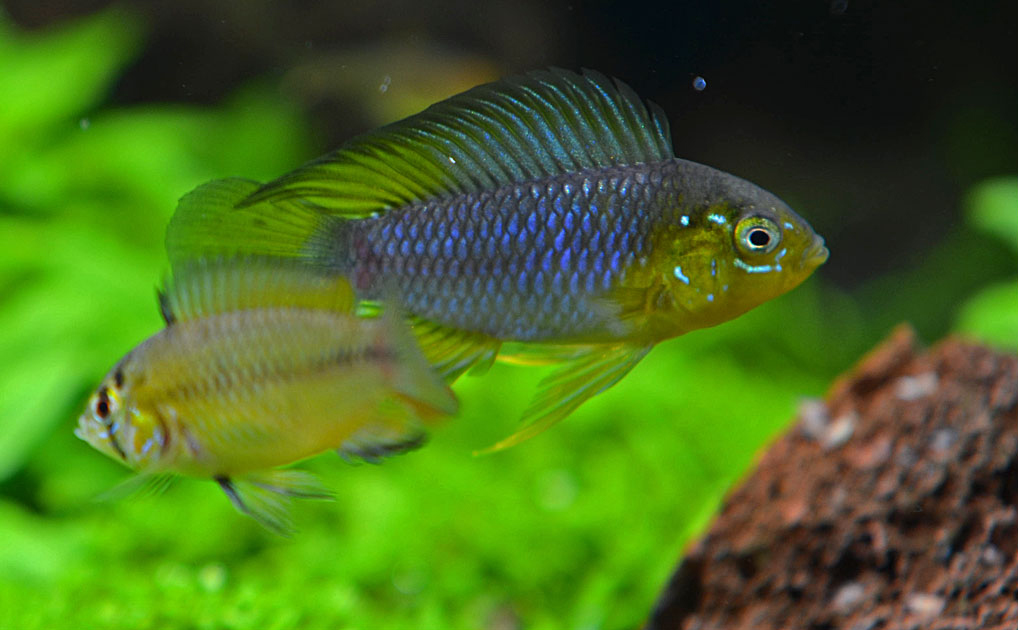
Apistogramma borellii, pair

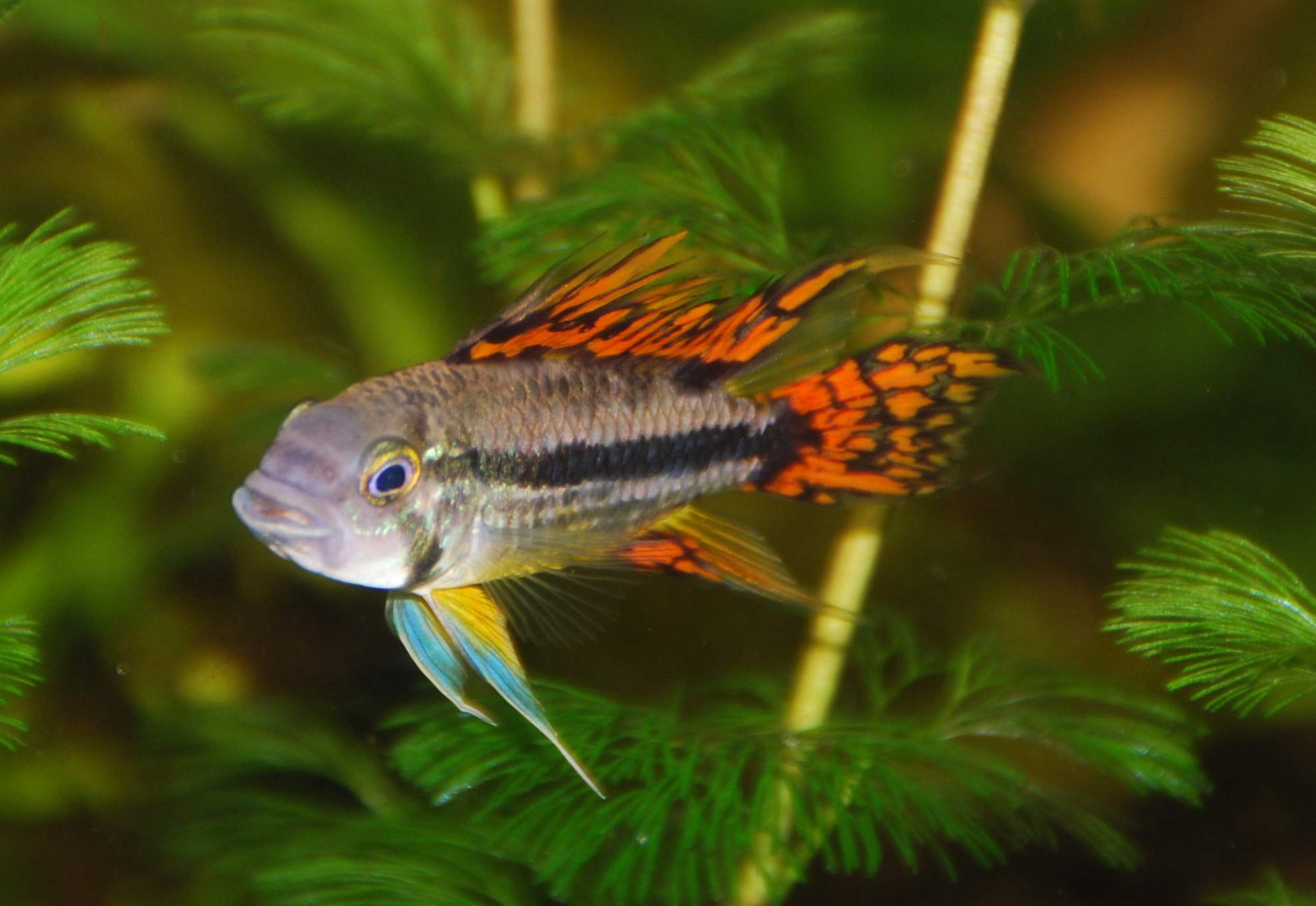
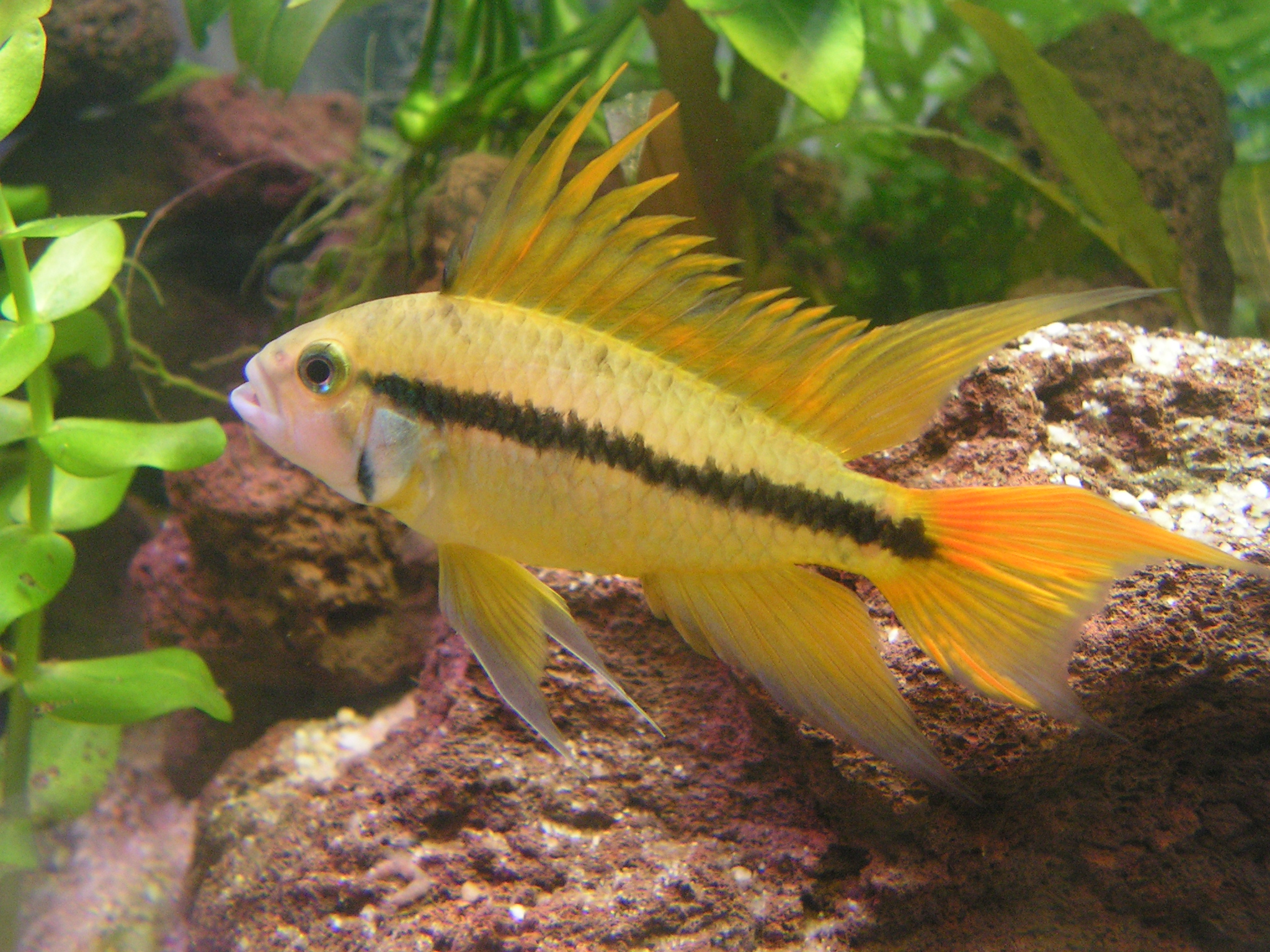
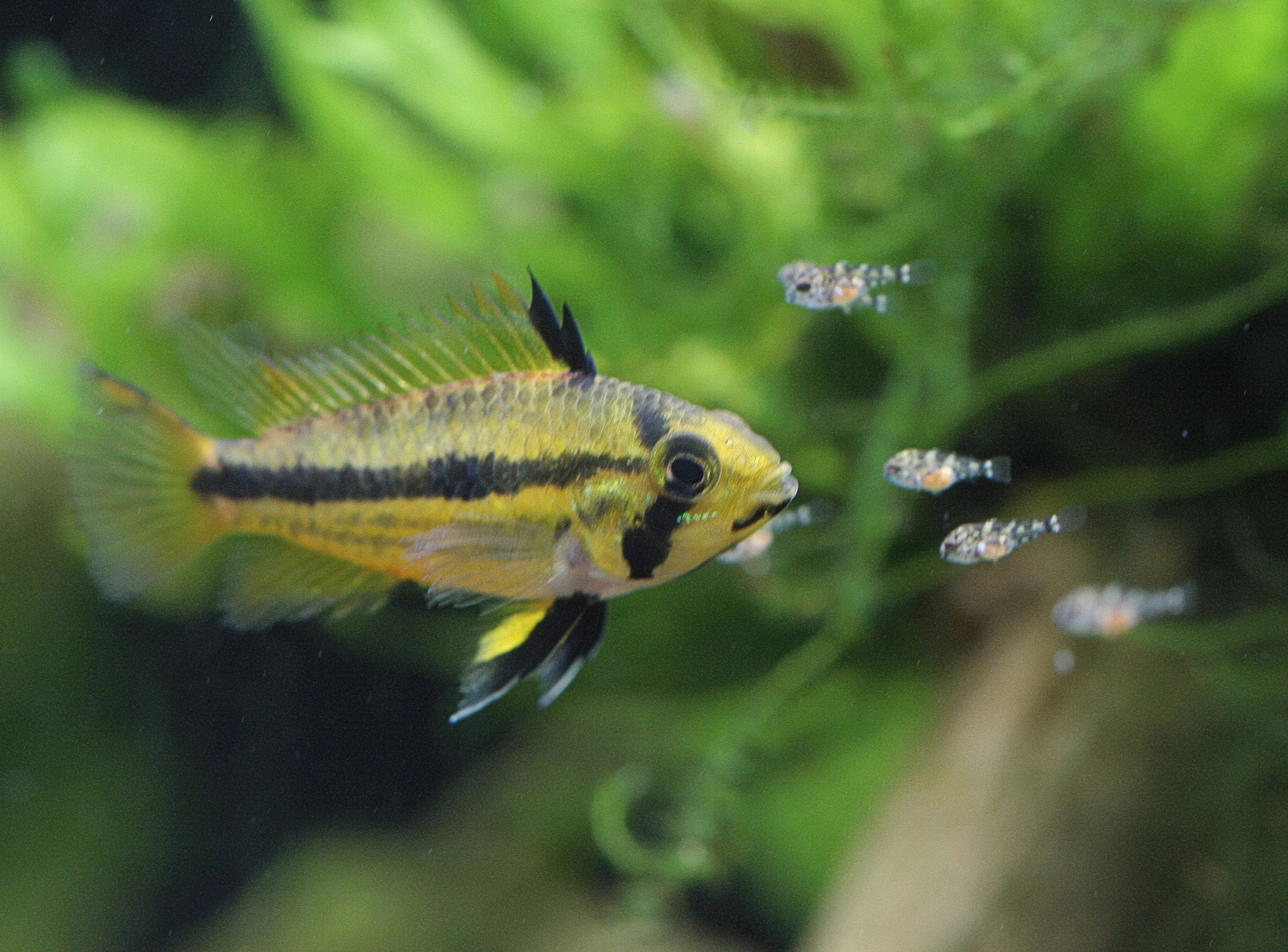
Apistogramma cacatuoides, two male variants and female with fry

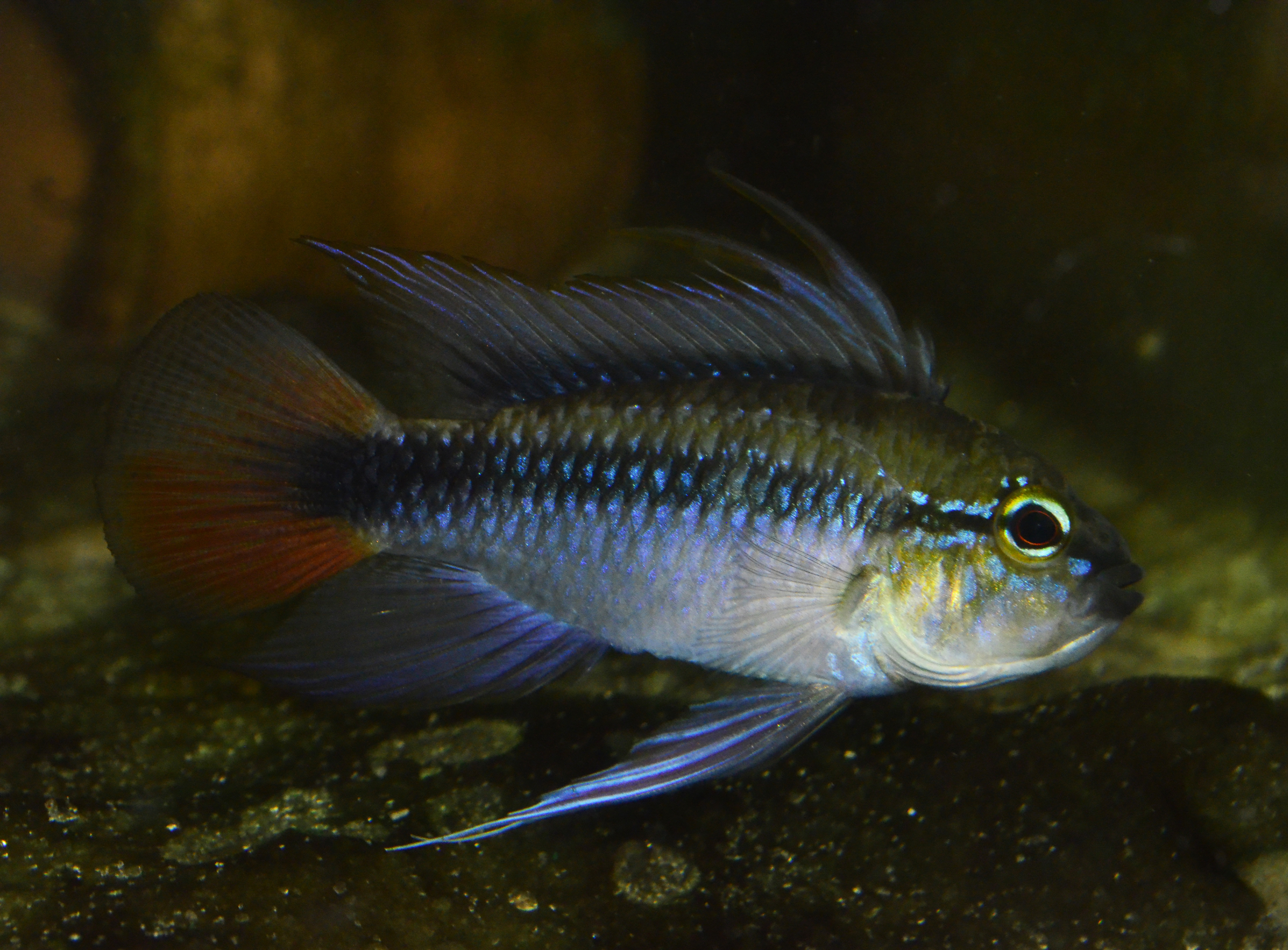
Apistogramma erythrura, male

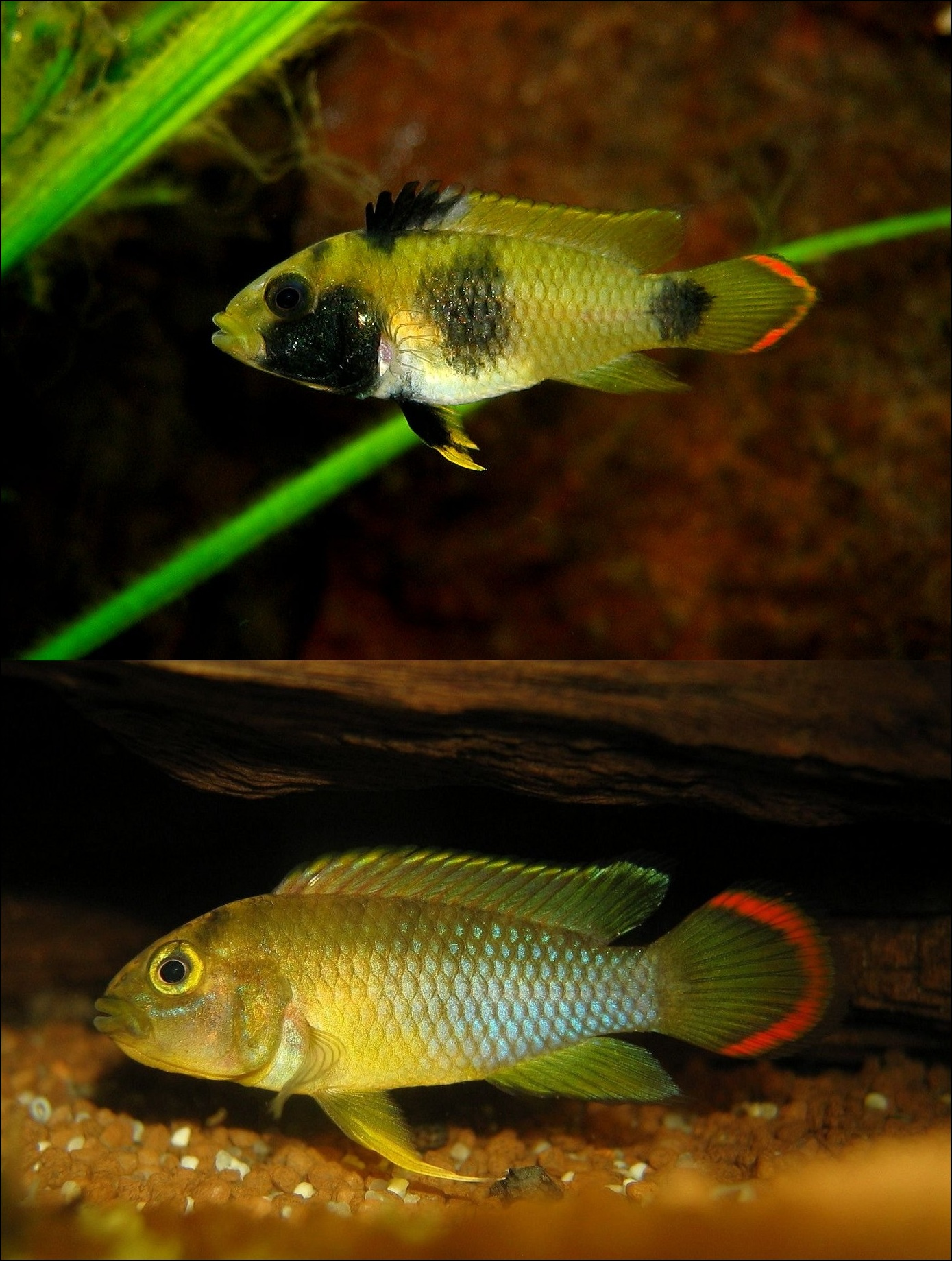
Apistogramma nijsseni, female and male

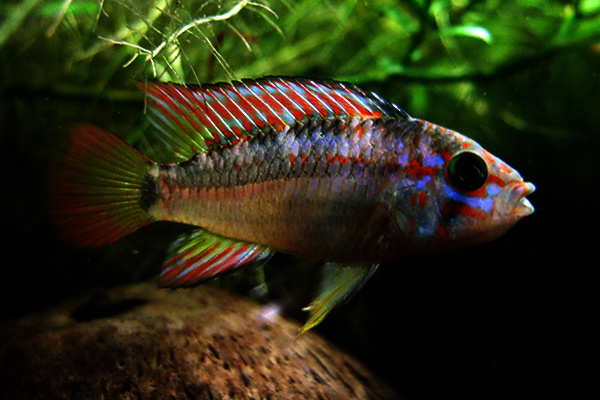
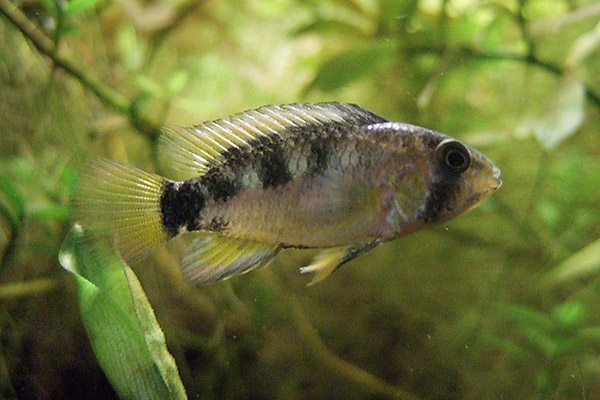
Apistogramma ortegai ("Papagayo" form), male and female
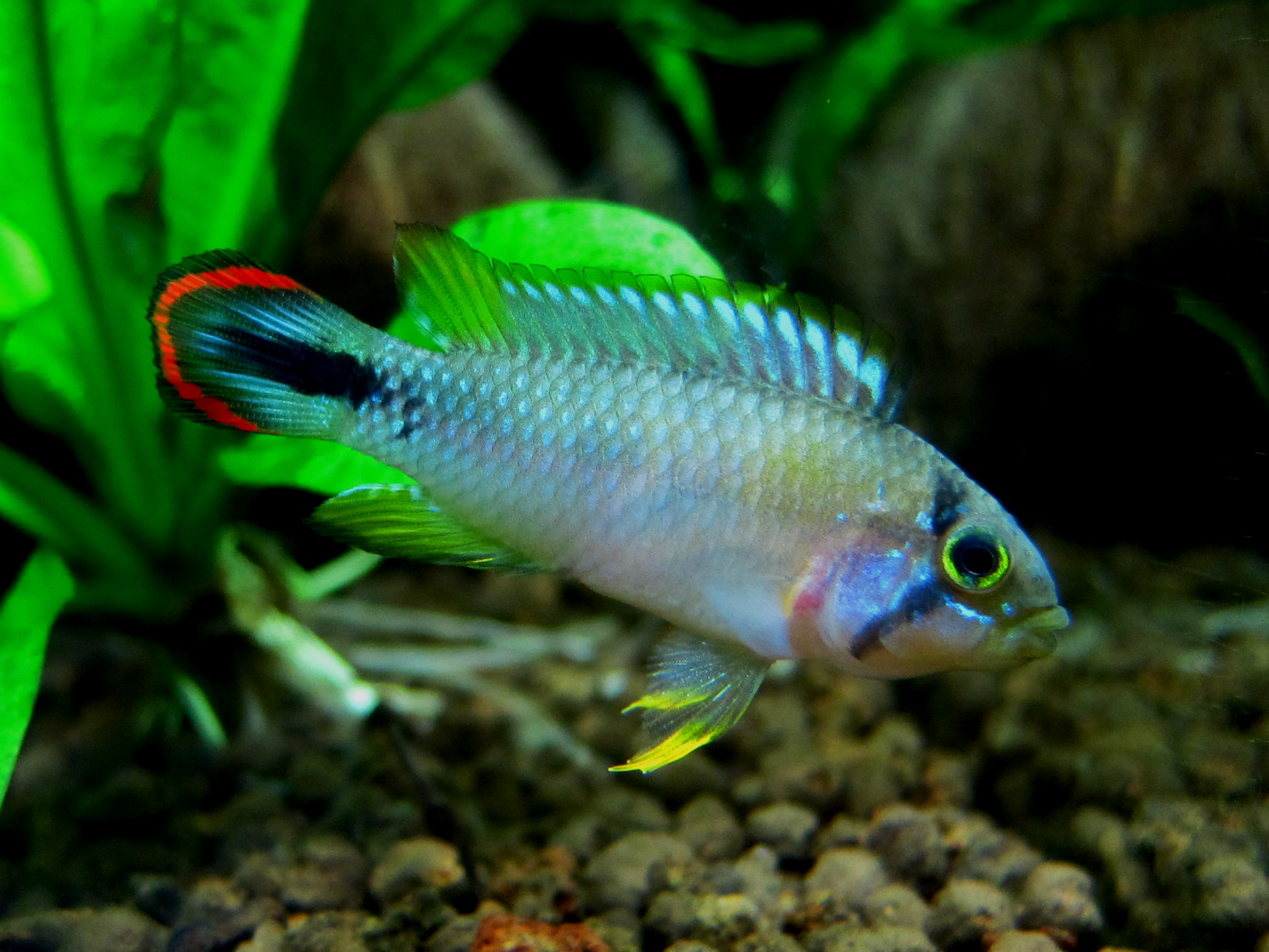
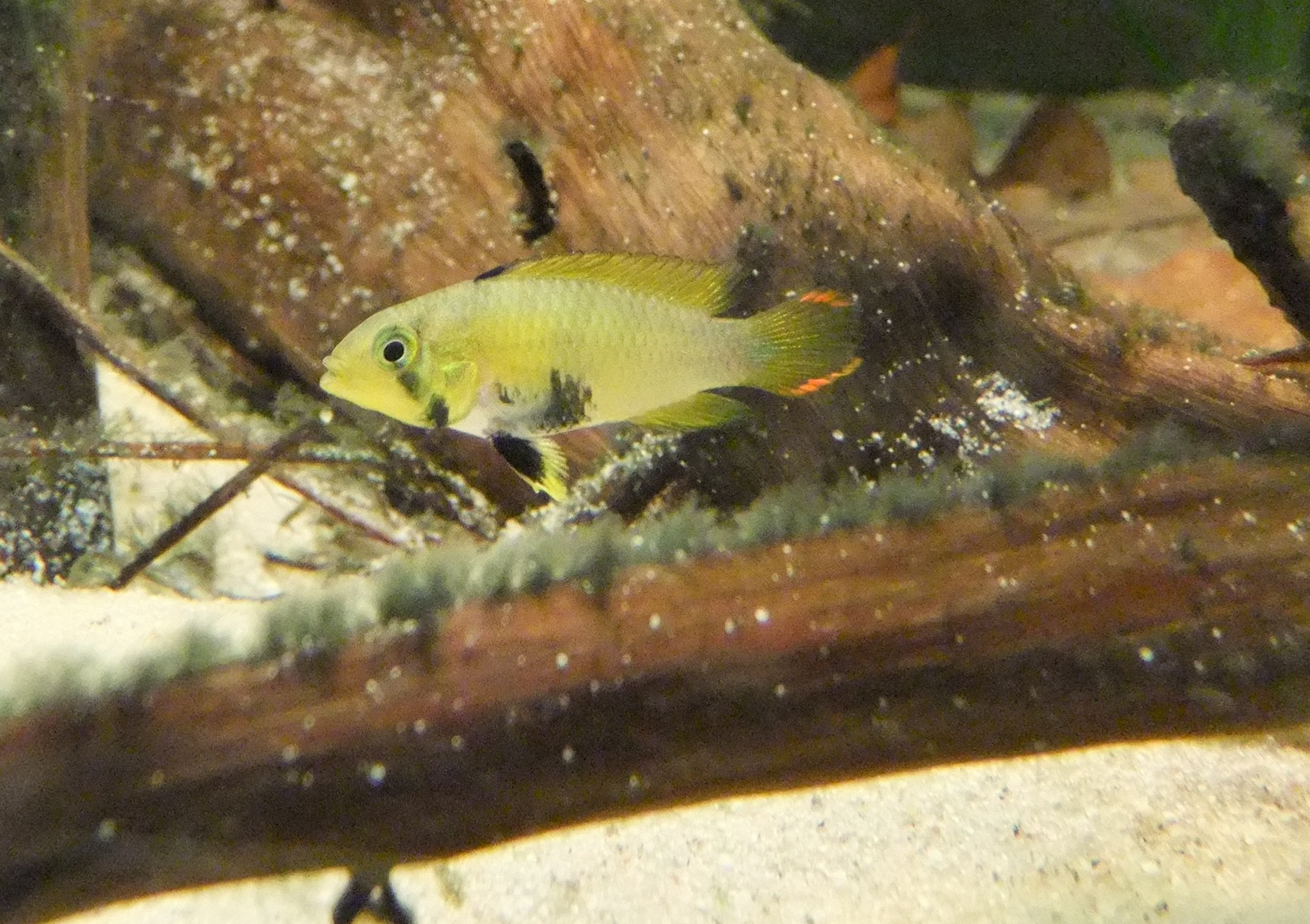
Apistogramma panduro, male and female

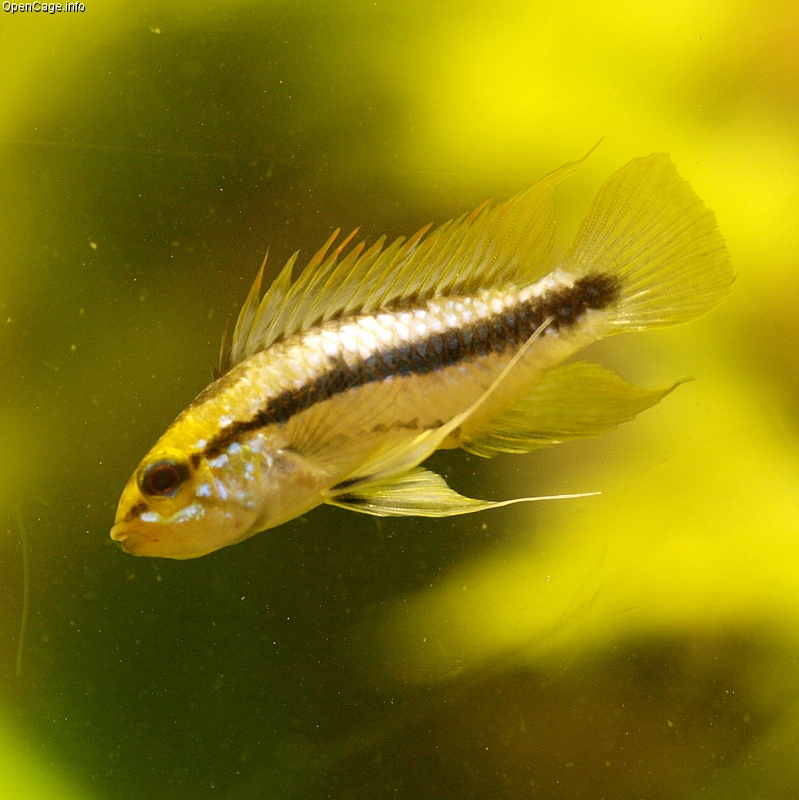
Apistogramma trifasciata, male

Apistogramma is part of Geophagini and its closest relatives are Apistogrammoides and Taeniacara. There are currently 93 recognized Apistogramma species, making it the most species-rich genus of cichlid in the Americas, together with Crenicichla. New species of Apistogramma are regularly described, and undescribed species—sometimes cryptic—are known to exist in the genus. Several of the recognized species occur in more than one form, and some of these actually may represent separate species, as appears to be the case for the "Papagayo" and "Pebás" forms, both typically included in A. ortegai. A comprehensive taxonomic review of the genus is necessary. The genus is sometimes divided into subgroups based on the appearance and phylogenetic relationship of the various species.

- Apistogramma acrensis Staeck, 2003
- Apistogramma agassizii (Steindachner, 1875)
- Apistogramma aguarico Römer & Hahn, 2013
- Apistogramma alacrina S. O. Kullander, 2004
- Apistogramma allpahuayo Römer et al., 2012
- Apistogramma amoena (Cope, 1872)
- Apistogramma angayuara S. O. Kullander & E. F. G. Ferreira, 2005
- Apistogramma arua Römer & Warzel, 1998
- Apistogramma atahualpa Römer, 1997
- Apistogramma baenschi Römer, Hahn, Römer, Soares & Wöhler, 2004
- Apistogramma barlowi Römer & Hahn, 2008
- Apistogramma bitaeniata Pellegrin, 1936
- Apistogramma borellii (Regan, 1906)
- Apistogramma brevis S. O. Kullander, 1980
- Apistogramma cacatuoides Hoedeman, 1951
- Apistogramma caetei S. O. Kullander, 1980
- Apistogramma caudomaculata Mesa_Salazar & Lasso, 2011
- Apistogramma cinilabra Römer et al., 2011
- Apistogramma commbrae (Regan, 1906)
- Apistogramma cruzi S. O. Kullander, 1986
- Apistogramma diplotaenia S. O. Kullander, 1987
- Apistogramma eleutheria Varella & Britzke, 2016
- Apistogramma elizabethae S. O. Kullander, 1980
- Apistogramma eremnopyge Ready & S. O. Kullander, 2004
- Apistogramma erythrura Staeck & I. Schindler, 2008
- Apistogramma eunotus S. O. Kullander, 1981
- Apistogramma feconat Römer et al., 2015
- Apistogramma flabellicauda Mesa-Salazar & Lasso, 2011
- Apistogramma flavipedunculata Varella & Britzke, 2016
- Apistogramma geisleri Meinken, 1971
- Apistogramma gephyra S. O. Kullander, 1980
- Apistogramma gibbiceps Meinken, 1969
- Apistogramma gossei S. O. Kullander, 1982
- Apistogramma guttata Antonio C., S. O. Kullander & Lasso A., 1989
- Apistogramma helkeri Schindler & Staeck, 2013
- Apistogramma hippolytae S. O. Kullander, 1982
- Apistogramma hoignei Meinken, 1965
- Apistogramma hongsloi S. O. Kullander, 1979
- Apistogramma huascar Römer, Pretor & Hahn, 2006
- Apistogramma inconspicua S. O. Kullander, 1983
- Apistogramma iniridae S. O. Kullander, 1979
- Apistogramma inornata Staeck, 2003
- Apistogramma intermedia Mesa-Salazar & Lasso, 2011
- Apistogramma juruensis S. O. Kullander, 1986
- Apistogramma kullanderi Varella & Sabaj Pérez, 2014
- Apistogramma lineata Mesa-Salazar & Lasso, 2011
- Apistogramma linkei Koslowski, 1985
- Apistogramma luelingi S. O. Kullander, 1976
- Apistogramma macmasteri S. O. Kullander, 1979
- Apistogramma martini Römer, Hahn, Römer, Soares & Wöhler, 2003
- Apistogramma megaptera Mesa Salazar & Lasso, 2011
- Apistogramma megastoma Römer et al., 2017
- Apistogramma meinkeni S. O. Kullander, 1980
- Apistogramma mendezi U. Römer, 1994
- Apistogramma minima Mesa S. & Lasso A., 2011
- Apistogramma moae S. O. Kullander, 1980
- Apistogramma nijsseni S. O. Kullander, 1979
- Apistogramma norberti Staeck, 1991
- Apistogramma nororientalis Mesa-Salazar & Lasso, 2011
- Apistogramma ortegai Britzke, C. de Oliveira & S. O. Kullander, 2014
- Apistogramma ortmanni (C. H. Eigenmann, 1912)
- Apistogramma panduro U. Römer, 1997
- Apistogramma pantalone Römer, Römer, Soares & Hahn, 2006
- Apistogramma paucisquamis S. O. Kullander & Staeck, 1988
- Apistogramma paulmuelleri Römer et al., 2013
- Apistogramma payaminonis S. O. Kullander, 1986
- Apistogramma pedunculata Mesa-Salazar & Lasso, 2011
- Apistogramma personata S. O. Kullander, 1980
- Apistogramma pertensis (Haseman, 1911)
- Apistogramma piaroa Mesa-Salazar & Lasso, 2011
- Apistogramma piauiensis S. O. Kullander, 1980
- Apistogramma playayacu Römer, Beninde & Hahn, 2011
- Apistogramma pleurotaenia (Regan, 1909)
- Apistogramma psammophila Staeck & Schindler, 2019
- Apistogramma pulchra S. O. Kullander, 1980
- Apistogramma regani S. O. Kullander, 1980
- Apistogramma resticulosa S. O. Kullander, 1980
- Apistogramma rositae Römer, Römer & Hahn, 2006
- Apistogramma rubrolineata Hein, Zarske & Zapata, 2002
- Apistogramma rupununi Fowler, 1914
- Apistogramma salpinction S. O. Kullander & E. F. G. Ferreira, 2005
- Apistogramma similis Staeck, 2003
- Apistogramma sororcula Staeck & Schindler, 2016
- Apistogramma staecki Koslowski, 1985
- Apistogramma steindachneri (Regan, 1908)
- Apistogramma taeniata (Günther, 1862)
- Apistogramma trifasciata (C. H. Eigenmann & C. H. Kennedy, 1903)
- Apistogramma tucurui Staeck, 2003
- Apistogramma uaupesi S. O. Kullander, 1980
- Apistogramma urteagai S. O. Kullander, 1986
- Apistogramma velifera Staeck, 2003
- Apistogramma viejita S. O. Kullander, 1979
- Apistogramma wapisana U. Römer, Hahn & Conrad, 2006
- Apistogramma wolli Römer et al., 2015
