= Yellow dwarf =

Yellow dwarf or Yellow Dwarf may refer to:

- G-type main-sequence stars, frequently referred to as "yellow dwarfs"
- Yellow dwarf cichlid, a species of fish
- Yellow Dwarf (card game), the French card game of Nain Jaune
- Yellow Dwarf (film), a 2001 Russian comedy film
- The Yellow Dwarf, a French literary fairy tale by Madame Marie-Catherine d'Aulnoy published in 1698
- The Yellow Dwarf (journal), a satirical French political journal of the 19th century
- The Yellow Dwarf, nickname of French statesman Jean Jardin
- The Yellow Dwarf (novel), a novel by Pascal Jardin published in 1978

== See also ==
- Barley yellow dwarf (BYD), a plant disease affecting cereals caused by the barley yellow dwarf virus (BYDV)
- Onion yellow dwarf virus (OYDV), a plant virus mainly infecting species of Allium
