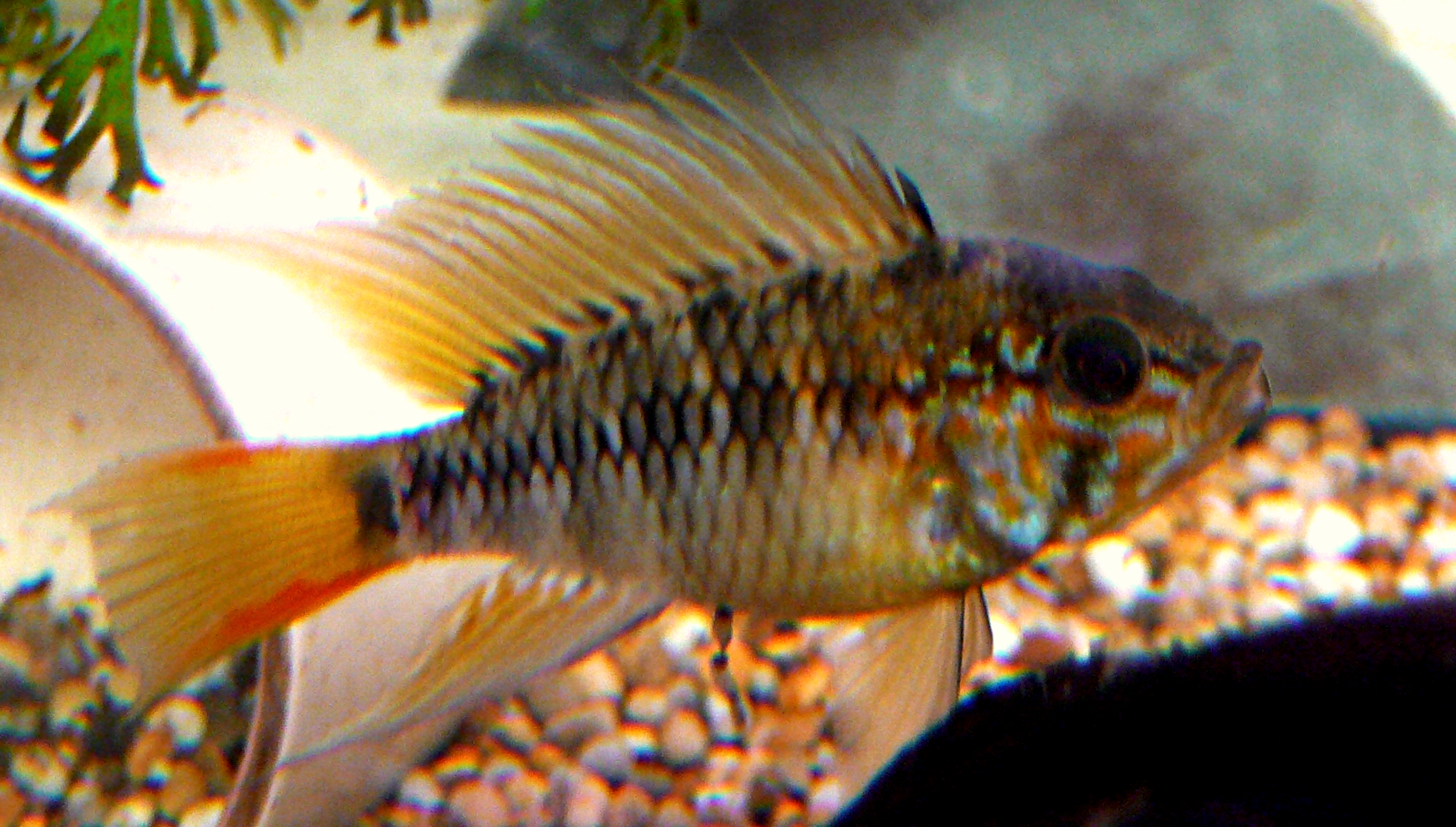

Scientific classification
- Domain: Eukaryota
- Kingdom: Animalia
- Phylum: Chordata
- Class: Actinopterygii
- Order: Cichliformes
- Family: Cichlidae
- Genus: Apistogramma
- Species: A. macmasteri

Binomial name
- Apistogramma macmasteri S. O. Kullander, 1979

= Apistogramma macmasteri =

Species of fish

Apistogramma macmasteri is a dwarf cichlid in the tribe Geophagini, one of the tribes of the subfamily of American cichlids, the Cichlinae. It is a freshwater fish that lives in the rivers Guaytiquía and Metica in the Meta River system. The Meta river system is a part of the Orinoco basin in Colombia. They live in areas with soft sandy bottom and plenty of dead roots and branches in the water. Plants are uncommon in areas where Apistogramma macmasteri is found.

They grow up to 7 centimetres (2.8 in) in total length.

Fish keepers have selectively bred variants with brighter colors than those found in the wild. It is possible that some of these are crossbred with Apistogramma viejita.

The author, Sven O. Kullander honoured the cichlid aquarist Mark McMaster with the specific name of this species. McMaster had pointed this species out to Kullander in 1973, when only aquarium specimens were available.

== Breeding ==
The female places her eggs inside the roof of a cavity or underneath a leaf. She takes care of the eggs and fry alone, while the male guards the territory.
