= Uwe Römer (ichthyologist) =

- Born: 1959
- Education: Bielefeld University
- Known for: Taxonomy and ecology of dwarf cichlids, author of Cichlid Atlas
- Awards: Species Laimosemion roemeri named in his honor
- Scientific career
- Fields: Biology, Ichthyology, Herpetology, Ornithology
- Workplaces: University of Trier

Uwe Römer (born 1959) is a German biologist and ichthyologist known for his research on South American dwarf cichlids, particularly species of the genus Apistogramma.

== Biography ==
Römer developed an interest in nature during his early childhood and, as a youth, studied the protection and biology of native fishes, amphibians, and reptiles. His later scientific focus expanded to ornithology and nature conservation, resulting in several long-term ecological studies. His early ornithological research included fieldwork on North Atlantic bird islands, in Scandinavia, and in North America.

During his studies at Bielefeld University, Römer's research interests shifted toward Neotropical fishes, particularly the genus Apistogramma, as well as ecological and ethnological questions relating to the Amazon Basin. In the 1990s, he conducted several research expeditions to the Rio Negro region of the Amazon.

In 1998, Römer completed his doctoral dissertation on the biology of Neotropical dwarf cichlids of the genus Apistogramma. After several years as an ichthyologist at a biological station, he refocused his studies on Neotropical cichlids, emphasizing biodiversity, evolutionary relationships, and the ecological roles of their physiological traits and social behavior. His work has included studies on environmental sex determination and the potential effects of climate change on cichlid life histories.

Römer received his habilitation in 2006 from the Department of Geosciences at the University of Trier, where he obtained the venia legendi for biogeography. He has described several new species of Apistogramma, including Apistogramma mendezi in 1994, named for Brazilian environmentalist Chico Mendes, and Apistogramma barlowi in 2007, co-described with Ingo Hahn and named in honor of George W. Barlow.

He is also an accomplished photographer, with his photographs illustrating most of his publications and presentations, including both volumes of Cichlid Atlas: Natural History of South American Dwarf Cichlids. In addition to his scientific work, Römer teaches biology and chemistry at a school, lectures at Trier University, and continues to write and photograph professionally.

In recognition of his contributions to ichthyology, the species Laimosemion roemeri was named after him.

== Species described ==
- Apistogramma aguarico Römer & Hahn, 2013
- Apistogramma allpahuayo Römer et al., 2012
- Apistogramma arua Römer & Warzel, 1998
- Apistogramma atahualpa Römer, 1997
- Apistogramma baenschi Römer, 2004
- Apistogramma barlowi Römer & Hahn, 2008
- Apistogramma cinilabra Römer, Duponchelle, Vela-Diaz, Garcia-Davilla, Sirvas, Diaz-Catchay & Renno, 2011
- Apistogramma feconat Römer, Soares, García Dávila, Duponchelle, Renno & Hahn, 2015
- Apistogramma huascar Römer, Pretor & Hahn, 2006
- Apistogramma martini Römer, Hahn, Römer, Soares & Wöhler, 2003
- Apistogramma megastoma Römer, Römer, Estivals, Díaz, Duponchelle, García Dávila, Hahn & Renno, 2017
- Apistogramma mendezi Römer, 1994
- Apistogramma panduro Römer, 1997
- Apistogramma pantalone Römer, Römer, Soares & Hahn, 2006
- Apistogramma paulmuelleri Römer, Beninde, Duponchelle, Vela-Díaz & Renno, 2013
- Apistogramma playayacu Römer, Beninde & Hahn, 2011
- Apistogramma rositae Römer, Römer & Hahn, 2006
- Apistogramma wapisana Römer, Hahn & Conrad, 2006
- Apistogramma wolli Römer, Soares, García Dávila, Duponchelle, Renno & Hahn, 2015
- Dicrossus foirni Römer, Hahn & Vergara, 2010
- Dicrossus warzeli Römer, Hahn & Vergara, 2010

=== Genera ===
- Ivanacara Römer & Hahn, 2006

== Selected publications ==
- Römer, Uwe (2002). Cichlid Atlas – Natural History of South American Dwarf Cichlids. Vol. 1. Melle, Germany: Mergus Verlag. ISBN 3-88244-056-2.
- Römer, Uwe (2006). Cichlid Atlas – Natural History of South American Dwarf Cichlids. Vol. 2. Melle, Germany: Mergus Verlag. ISBN 978-3-88244-041-6.
