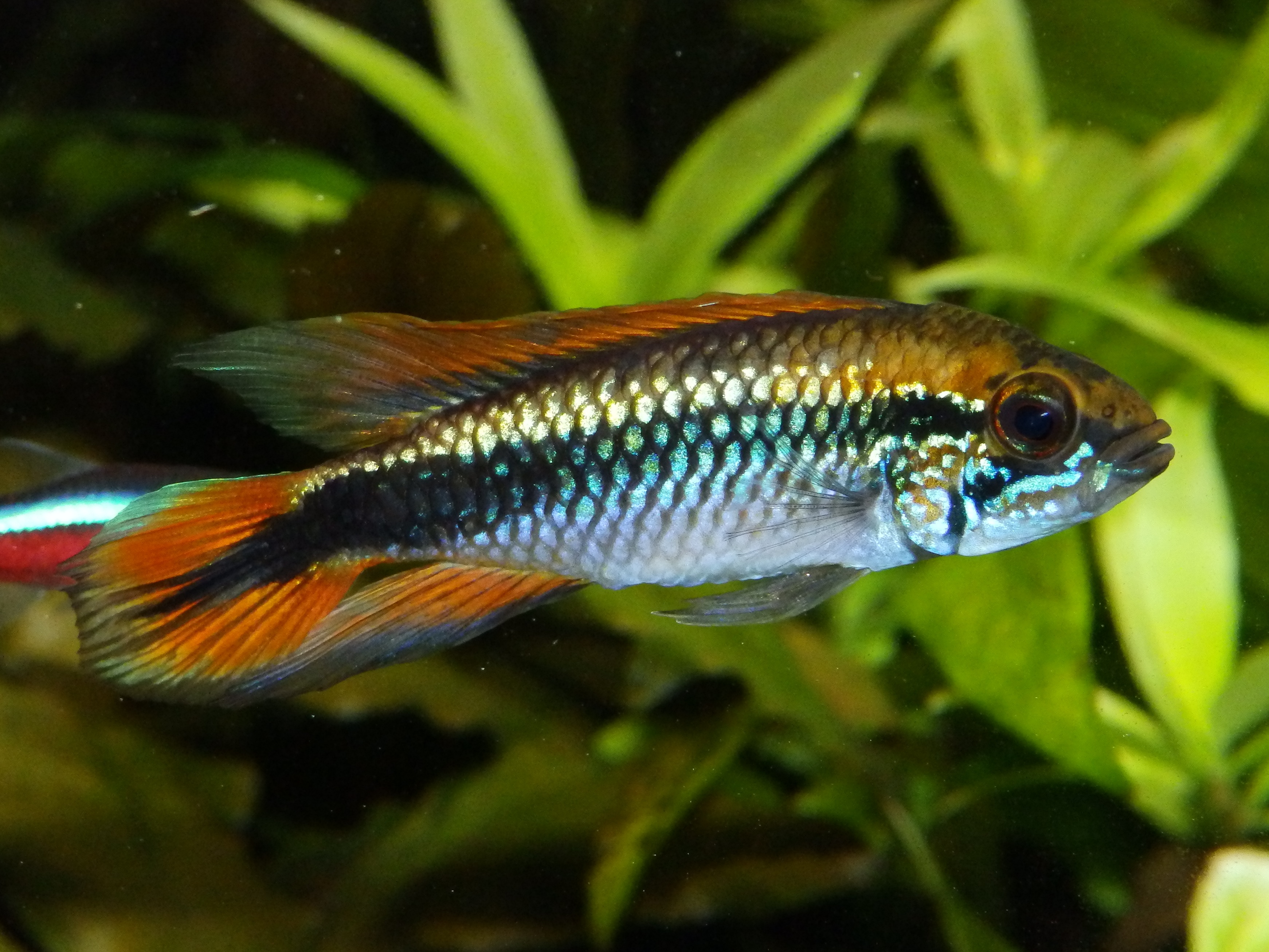

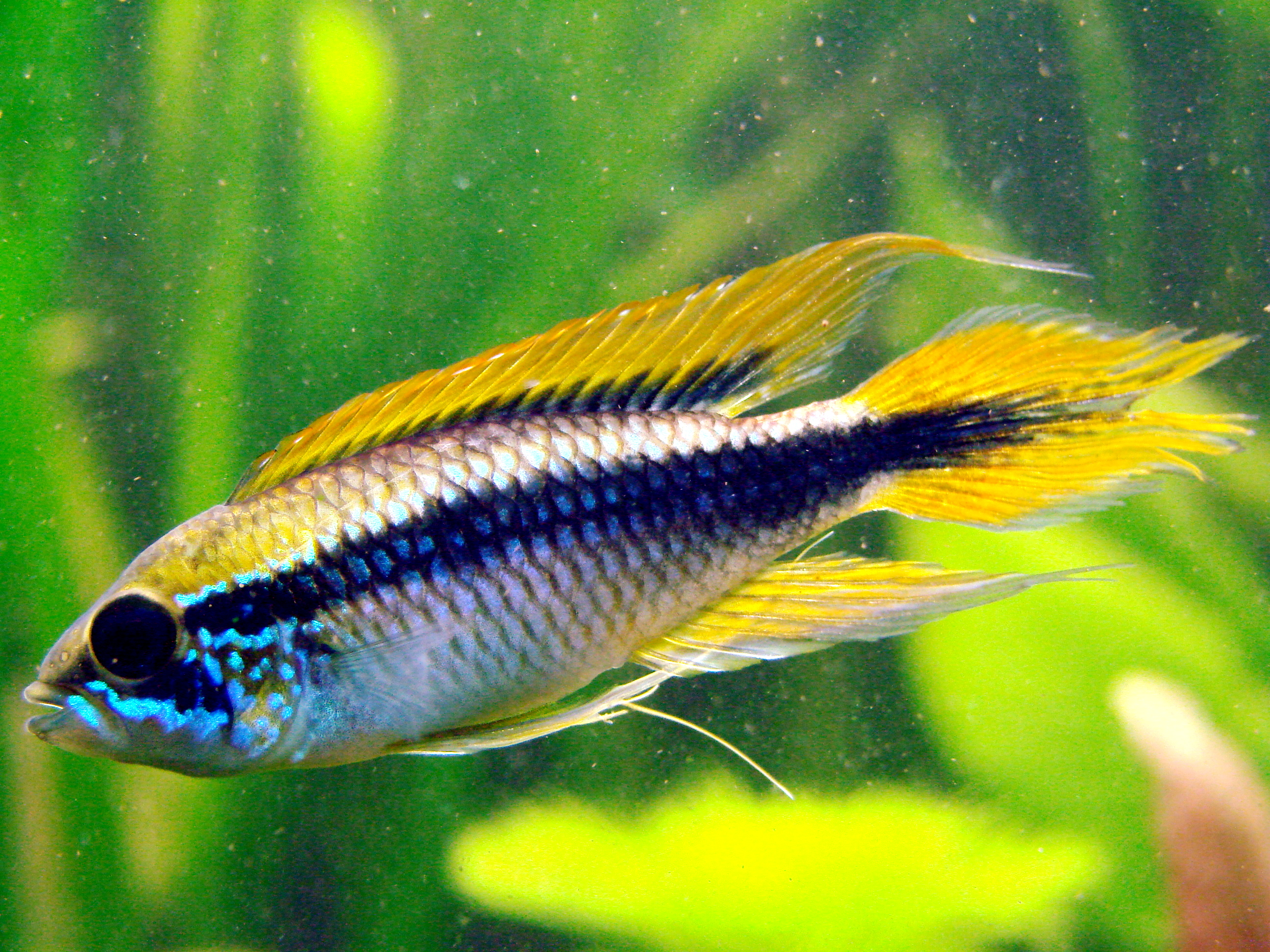
- Two male variants

Conservation status
- Least Concern (IUCN 3.1)

Scientific classification
- Kingdom: Animalia
- Phylum: Chordata
- Class: Actinopterygii
- Order: Cichliformes
- Family: Cichlidae
- Genus: Apistogramma
- Species: A. agassizii

Binomial name
- Apistogramma agassizii (Steindachner, 1875)

Synonyms
- Geophagus agassizii Steindachner, 1875; Apistogramma agassizi (Steindachner, 1875); Apistogramma parva Ahl, 1931

= Apistogramma agassizii =

Species of fish

Apistogramma agassizii, commonly known as Agassiz's dwarf cichlid, is a species of cichlid found in the Marañón and Ucayali River in Peru, some tributaries of the Amazon River, as well as downstream to the estuary in the Atlantic. It is named after the Swiss-American zoologist and geologist Louis Agassiz (1807–1873).

== Description ==
Apistogramma agassiziii is a small, sexual dimorphic, and territorial fish. The males are larger, more colorful, and have more prolonged fins compared to females of the species. Body color and fin length are important characteristics during courtship and mating in the breeding seasons where larger males are more likely to control better quality territory and have more access to food. The larger and more colorful males are preferred by buyers of ornamental fish.

Both males and females undergo four developmental phases of gonad maturation: immature, developing, spawning capable, and regressing. Mature females release a single batch of oocytes once in each breeding season. However spawning is partial – not all Apistogramma agassiziii spawn at the same time. This is possibly an evolutionary adaptation to extreme seasonal changes, i.e. changes in water level, that ensures the resilience of the species by continuously introducing new, young individuals into the population.

The diet of Apistogramma agassiziii varies depending on habitat. In forest areas, the diet is mainly adult insects and insect fragments, whereas in a pasture environment, Apistogramma agassizii prefers the larvae of insects such as Diptera species.

== Distribution and habitat ==
Apistogramma agassizii lives in shallow waters, endemic to the Amazon basin. It prefers habitats with minimal current where plant debris, particularly dead leaves, accumulate as shelter from predators, both larger fishes and aerial predators. Of the 94 species of Apistogramma considered valid, Apistogramma agassizii, along with Apistogramma cacatuoides and Apistogramma bitaeniata, is one of the very few with a large distribution range.

=== Taxonomy ===
Numerous researchers have suggested that the wide range suggests that Apistogramma agassizii is actually more than one distinct species. A study by Estivals et al. (2020) in the Peruvian Amazon showed at least three separate genotypic clusters and estimated that the Apistogramma agassizii designation actually holds "tens of species". Using molecular dating, they estimated that the three proposed species would have begun to diverge from the most recent common ancestor during the Plio-Pleistocene period, which greatly affected river dynamics and could have created geological restrictions between the different clusters, leading to species divergence. As a result, they propose that Apistogramma agassizii no longer be considered a single, widespread taxon, but rather a mosaic of species with distinct, but still unknown, geographical distribution.

== Relationship to humans ==
=== In aquaria ===
Just like all dwarf cichlids, Apistogramma agassizii requires weekly partial water changes in order to keep the nitrate levels as low as possible. It prefers a hardness level of 50–100 mg/L and a pH of 6.0.

They should be housed in an aquarium of at least 10 gallons. In order to reduce problems arising from their territorial nature, it is important to break up lines of sight within the aquarium, something that can be achieved with bogwood, root ornaments and hardy plants. They should not be kept in the same aquarium as other dwarf cichlids. A better choice of tankmates would be a shoal of tetras or other small fish native to the Amazon River.

=== Threats ===
Apistogramma agassizii is affected by increasing water temperatures due to climate change. These effects can be exacerbated by deforestation, which affects the ability of Apistogramma agassizii, other Apistogramma species, and other stream fishes to cope with changes in water temperature and quality. Additionally, fishermen along the Amazon have been known to use barbasco, a plant-derived, non-specific ichthyotoxin that kills almost all fish in the area when used. Apistogramma agassizii is also highly sensitive to copper exposure, an increasing concern due to growing metal contamination in the Amazon.

== See also ==
- List of freshwater aquarium fish species

== Sources ==
- Encyclopaedia of Aquarium and Pond Fish (2005) (David Alderton)
