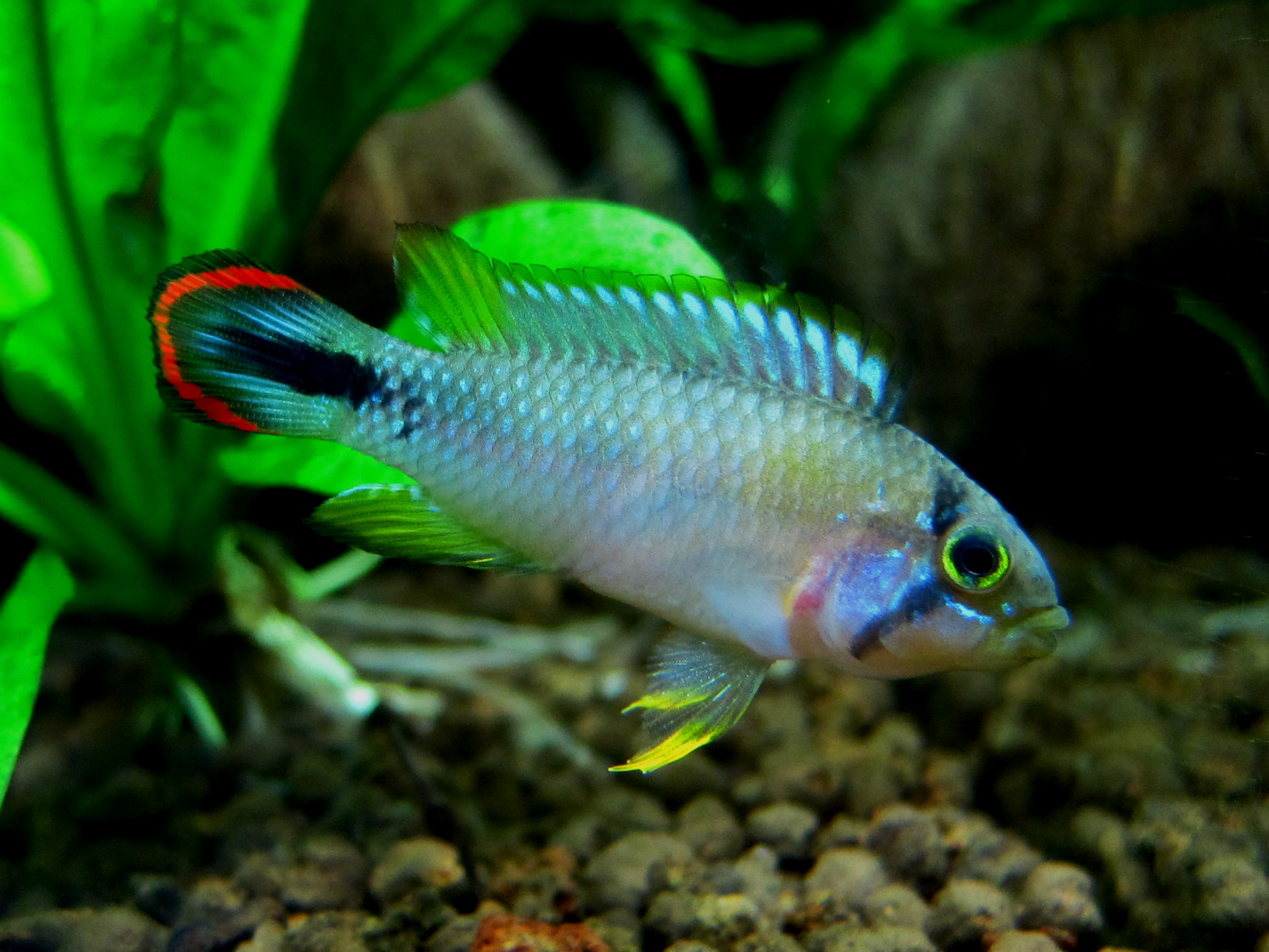

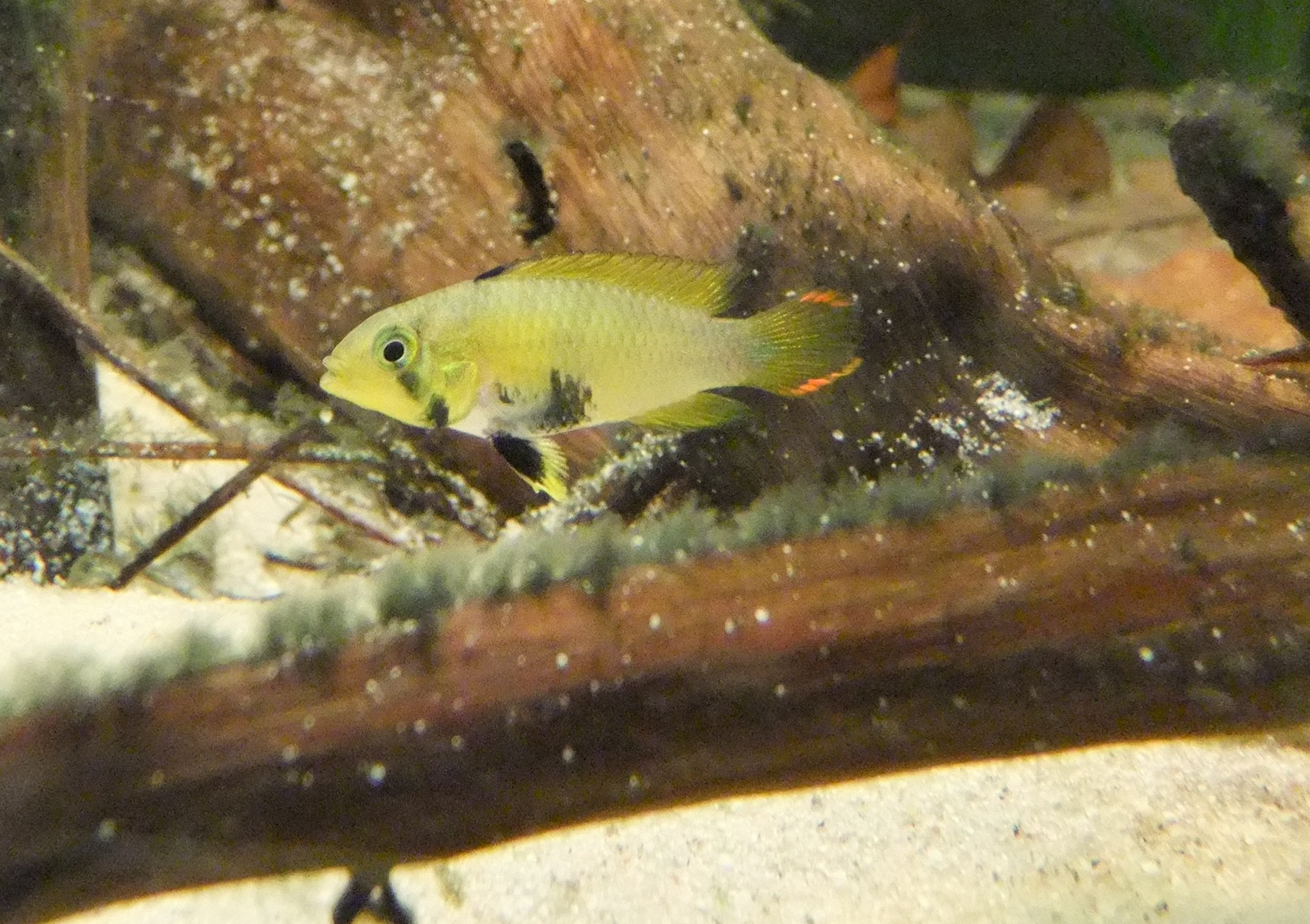
- male above, female below

Conservation status
- Least Concern (IUCN 3.1)

Scientific classification
- Kingdom: Animalia
- Phylum: Chordata
- Class: Actinopterygii
- Order: Cichliformes
- Family: Cichlidae
- Genus: Apistogramma
- Species: A. panduro

Binomial name
- Apistogramma panduro U. Römer, 1997

= Apistogramma panduro =

Species of fish

Apistogramma panduro (A-183), also commonly referred to as Apistogramma pandurini, is a small species of cichlid freshwater fish from the Amazon river basin in Peru. It is closely related to A. nijsseni, so much so that they are placed in the A. nijsseni species group. Some common names for A. panduro are blue panda apisto, and Panduros' apisto.

== Origin ==
Its name is derived from the Peruvian fish exporters who first collected it within the limited ranges in the western Amazon region, captured within the blackwater streams near Colonia, Peru. The waters are particularly softer and more acidic (pH < 6) with a sandy substrate. The distribution of the A. nijsseni species group (to which A. panduro belongs) occurs in isolated blackwater tributaries of the Marañon River, Ucayali River, Nanay River and Napo River of Peru, which drain to ancient Napo Superfan. They have a tendency for inhabiting low speed branching waterways found most commonly under cover due to increased light diffusion into the water by leaves and other shade sources.

== Aquarium ==
A pair of A. panduro require on average an aquarium tank that is 60x30x30 centimeters in dimension. When planning to breed or when more individuals are included, larger tanks may be required. Aquarium accessories or decor have low impact on A. panduro as they seem to not be influenced on objects located within their space as long as these items are not too limiting to the overall free tank area. If it is a goal to recreate natural habitats for the aquarium soft substrate, shaded areas provided by artificial leaves or large overhang would create this best. Additionally, the overall composition of the water could be naturalized by the addition of tank grade peat in filter systems. This would replicate the sediment/substrate rich habitat A. panduro is found in greatest abundance. This addition would stabilize pH and inoculate microbial production within the sediment which can provide as an additional/natural food source. Water flow and filtration should be minimal avoiding water replacement of the peat. Primarily, shaded lighting or dim lighting is most preferred, along with non-toxic aquatic plants that would provide shade or floating vegetation that would allow for further diffusion of light through the tank.

=== Maintenance ===
A. panduros are not known to be picky eaters and can adapt to most high quality foods. Live foods are best when breeding it. A. panduros form strong pair bonds and spawn in the typical Apistogramma fashion, with their broods being particularly more smaller than most species. Fry will normally easily take newly hatched brine shrimp and the level of care is typical for the genus.

=== Breeding ===
If someone is planning to breed a pair of A. panduro, the best method is to buy them as juveniles and allow them to choose their own partner in your aquarium. When a pair is at maturity, breeding can be accomplished in a 15-gallon aquarium. A. panduro spawn in water with a low pH. The breeding pair can be fed a variety of live food, frozen meaty foods, and flake food. Females are very devoted to their young, and they care for both the eggs and larvae. An ideal breeding aquarium includes rocks, moderate lighting, fine sand, caves, and live plants. One type of plant that would work well in this community is Java moss. Java moss makes a good home for infusoria, which is the fry's first food. Once the fry mature they can eat microworms and newly hatched brine shrimp. However, a water change must be completed after feeding live food to ensure proper water quality.
