= George W. Barlow =

George Webber Barlow (June 15, 1929 – July 14, 2007) was an American ichthyologist, an ethologist (animal behaviorist) and evolutionary biologist specializing in fish. Barlow was a well-known expert on cichlid fishes.

== Tribute ==
Apistogramma barlowi U. Römer, & I. J. Hahn, 2008, a dwarf cichlid was named in Barlow's honor.

== See also ==
- Category:Taxa named by George W. Barlow
