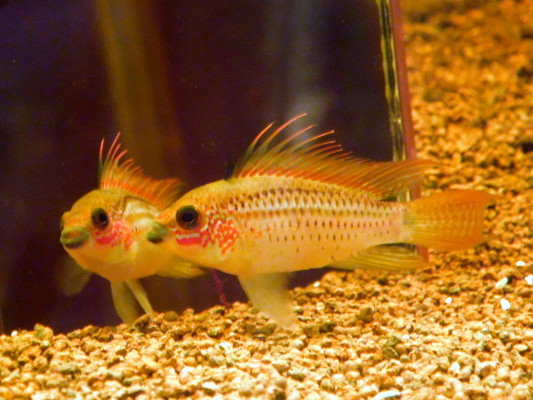

Conservation status
- Least Concern (IUCN 3.1)

Scientific classification
- Domain: Eukaryota
- Kingdom: Animalia
- Phylum: Chordata
- Class: Actinopterygii
- Order: Cichliformes
- Family: Cichlidae
- Genus: Apistogramma
- Species: A. eremnopyge

Binomial name
- Apistogramma eremnopyge Ready & S. O. Kullander, 2004

= Apistogramma eremnopyge =

Species of fish

Apistogramma eremnopyge is a species of cichlid. It is only known from the Rio Pintuyacu, a tributary of the Rio Itaya near Iquitos, Peru. Most of the tributaries of this river system carry acid blackwater (pH ~ 5).

This is a small cichlid, 26–35 mm (1.0–1.4 in) standard length which can be easily distinguished from its congeners by the presence of a prominent dark blotch on the lower part of the caudal peduncle in both sexes. The male is strikingly coloured with vivid blue and red patterning on the cheek and operculum and maroon, orange and blue colouring on the dorsal fin.
