= Christin Gmelch =

German politician (born 1987)

Member of the Landtag of Bavaria
- Incumbent
- Assumed office 4 April 2025
- Preceded by: Ingo Hahn
- Constituency: Upper Bavaria

Personal details
- Born: 10 December 1987 (age 38)
- Party: Alternative for Germany (since 2020)

Christin Gmelch (née Schönberg; born 10 December 1987) is a German politician serving as a member of the Landtag of Bavaria since 2025. She has served as treasurer of the Alternative for Germany in Neuburg-Schrobenhausen since 2025.
