= Apistogramma regani =

Conservation status
- Least Concern (IUCN 3.1)

Scientific classification
- Kingdom: Animalia
- Phylum: Chordata
- Class: Actinopterygii
- Order: Cichliformes
- Family: Cichlidae
- Genus: Apistogramma
- Species: A. regani

Binomial name
- Apistogramma regani S. O. Kullander, 1980

Species of fish

Apistogramma regani is a species of South American dwarf cichlid. It is a freshwater fish found in the lower Rio Negro basin in the Amazon. The specific name is in honour of the British ichthyologist Charles Tate Regan.
