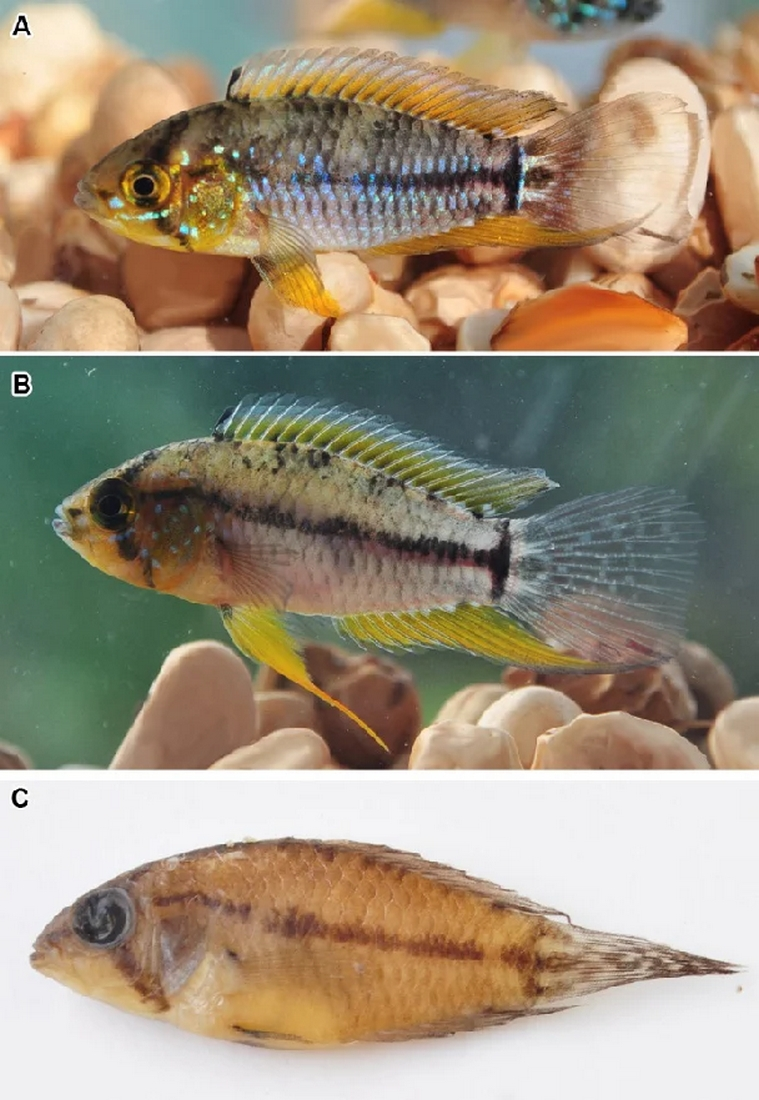

Scientific classification
- Kingdom: Animalia
- Phylum: Chordata
- Class: Actinopterygii
- Order: Cichliformes
- Family: Cichlidae
- Genus: Apistogrammoides; Meinken, 1965
- Species: A. pucallpaensis

Binomial name
- Apistogrammoides pucallpaensis Meinken, 1965

= Apistogrammoides =

Genus of fishes

Apistogrammoides pucallpaensis is a South American dwarf cichlid that reaches up to 2.7 cm (1.1 in) in standard length. This fish is found in the western Amazon basin, including the systems of the lower Ucayali, lower Japurá and upper Amazon River, in Peru, Colombia and Brazil. It typically lives among leaf litter or floating plants in water with little or no current. It is the only known member of the genus Apistogrammoides, but it is closely related to Apistogramma.
