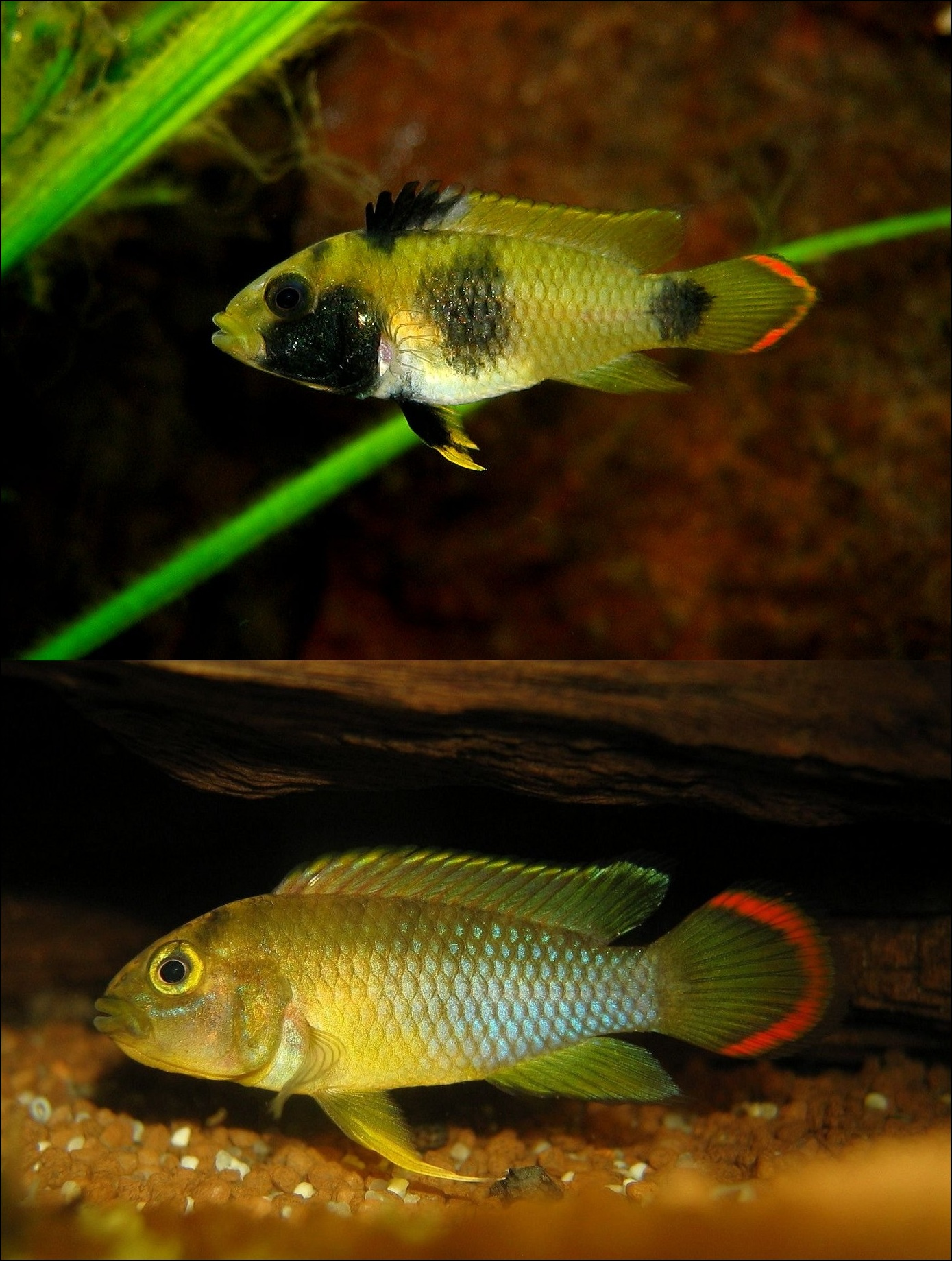
- Female A. nijsseni (top) and male (bottom)

Conservation status
- Data Deficient (IUCN 3.1)

Scientific classification
- Kingdom: Animalia
- Phylum: Chordata
- Class: Actinopterygii
- Order: Cichliformes
- Family: Cichlidae
- Genus: Apistogramma
- Species: A. nijsseni

Binomial name
- Apistogramma nijsseni S. O. Kullander, 1979

= Apistogramma nijsseni =

Species of fish

Apistogramma nijsseni, the panda dwarf cichlid, is a species of freshwater ray-finned fish belonging to the family Cichlidae, the cichlids. This fish is endemic to Peru, where it is known only from its type locality.

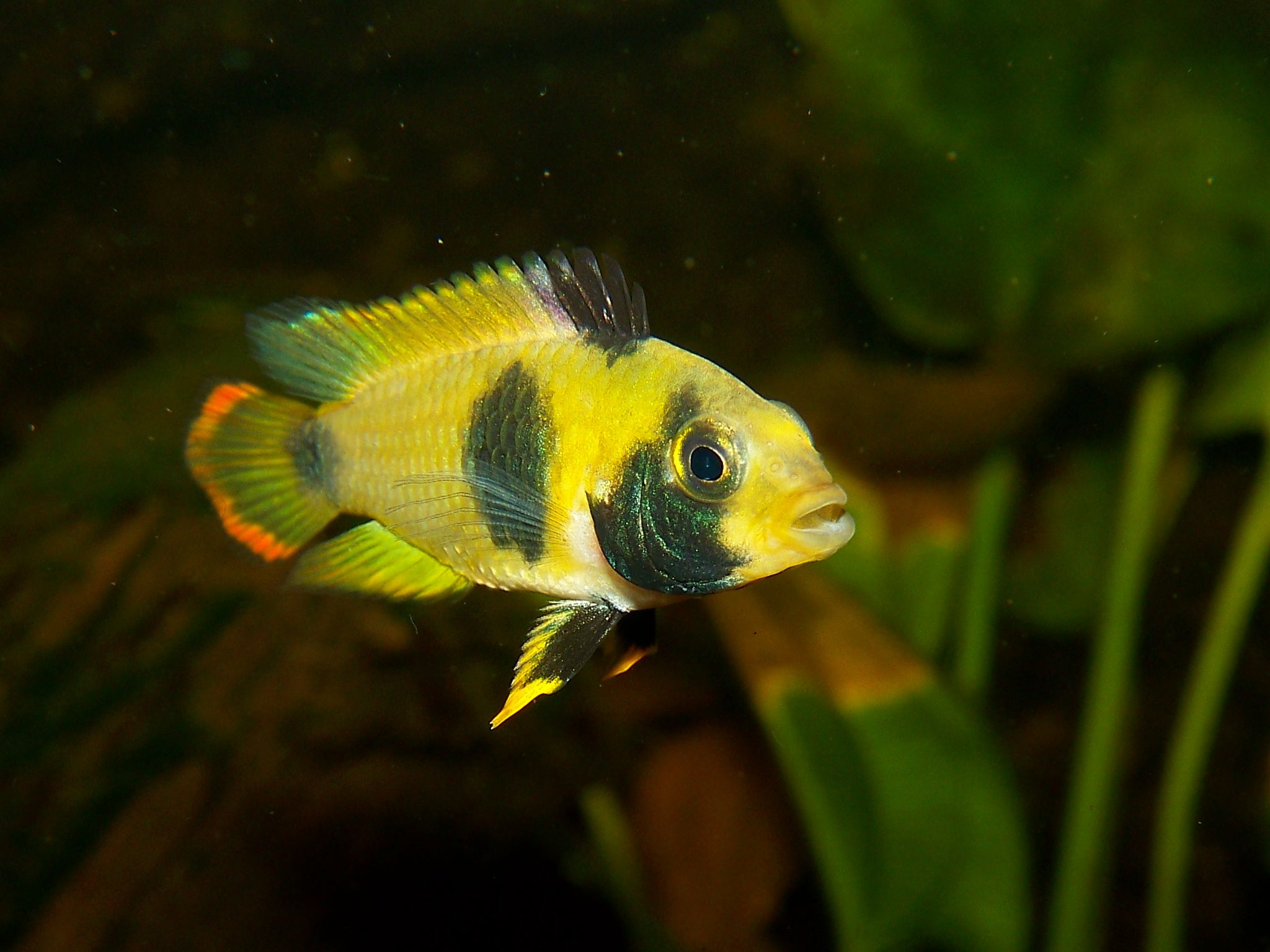
Apistogramma nijsseni adult female

== Taxonomy ==
Apistogramma nijsseni was first formally described in 1979 by the Swedish ichthyologist Sven O. Kullander, with its type locality given as the Río Copal at Jenaro Herrera in the Río Ucayali system, Loreto, Peru. This species is classified within the genus Apistogramma which is a speciose genus, which has been subdivided into species complexes, this species being the type species of the A. nijsseni species group which is within the A. trifasciata lineage. The A. nijsseni species group contains at least nine described species and over a dozen undescribed taxa. The genus Apistogramma is classified within the tribe Geophagini of the subfamily Cichlinae, the American cichlids, of the family Cichlidae, within the order Cichliformes.

== Etymology ==
Apistogramma nijsseni is classified within the genus Apistogramma. This name combines the Greek apistos, meaning "inconstant", with gramme, which means "line". Charles Tate Regan, who proposed this genus in 1913, did not explain what this alluded to. It is thought that it may refer to the variable development of the lateral line which primarily consists of pored scales. The specific name honours the Dutch ichthyologist Han Nijssen of the Zoölogisch Museum Amsterdam, who wrote many papers about South American fishes, as well as bringing the species to Kullander's attention.

== Description ==
Apistogramma nijsseni is a member of the A. nijsseni species group. This group comprises relatively large species of dwarf cichlid. They have moderately deep, robust and laterally compressed bodies. Their heads are comparatively large, with well-developed jaws and fleshy lips. They have dark brachiostegial membranes which they spread in displays to increase the apparent size of the head. The males have dorsal fins which may be low through to high with deep serrations. The tips of the soft rayed portions of the dorsal and anal fins are soft and blunt. When guarding eggs, the females develop large dark patches on the opercula, sides or abdomen, which may be mirrored in males, although it is often concealed under a blue sheen on the body. The band along the sides is typically not visible except in juveniles. The caudal fin for most species is round, but some are lyre-tailed or have two tips to the caudal fin. Many species develop a red or orange coloured band on the upper and lower margins of the caudal fin. A. nijsseni has a maximum standard length of 3.9 cm (1.5 in).

== Distribution and habitat ==
Apistogramma nijsseni is endemic to Peru, where the holotype was collected from the Copal River, in Jenaro Herrera, Ucayali river system, Loreto, where it is found in slow flowing Blackwater rivers.

== Conservation status ==
Apistogramma nijsseni is classified as Data Deficient by the International Union for Conservation of Nature because it has only been recorded from the type locality and there is an absence of data on its population size and trends. However, this species is found in the aquarium trade.

== See also ==
- List of freshwater aquarium fish species
