= Apistogramma taeniata =

Scientific classification
- Domain: Eukaryota
- Kingdom: Animalia
- Phylum: Chordata
- Class: Actinopterygii
- Order: Cichliformes
- Family: Cichlidae
- Genus: Apistogramma
- Species: A. taeniata

Binomial name
- Apistogramma taeniata (Günther, 1862)

Synonyms
- Apistogramma taeniatum (Günther, 1862); Mesops taeniatus Günther, 1862

Species of fish

Apistogramma taeniata is a small freshwater fish from the lower Tapajós River basin in Brazil. It is a dwarf cichlid.
