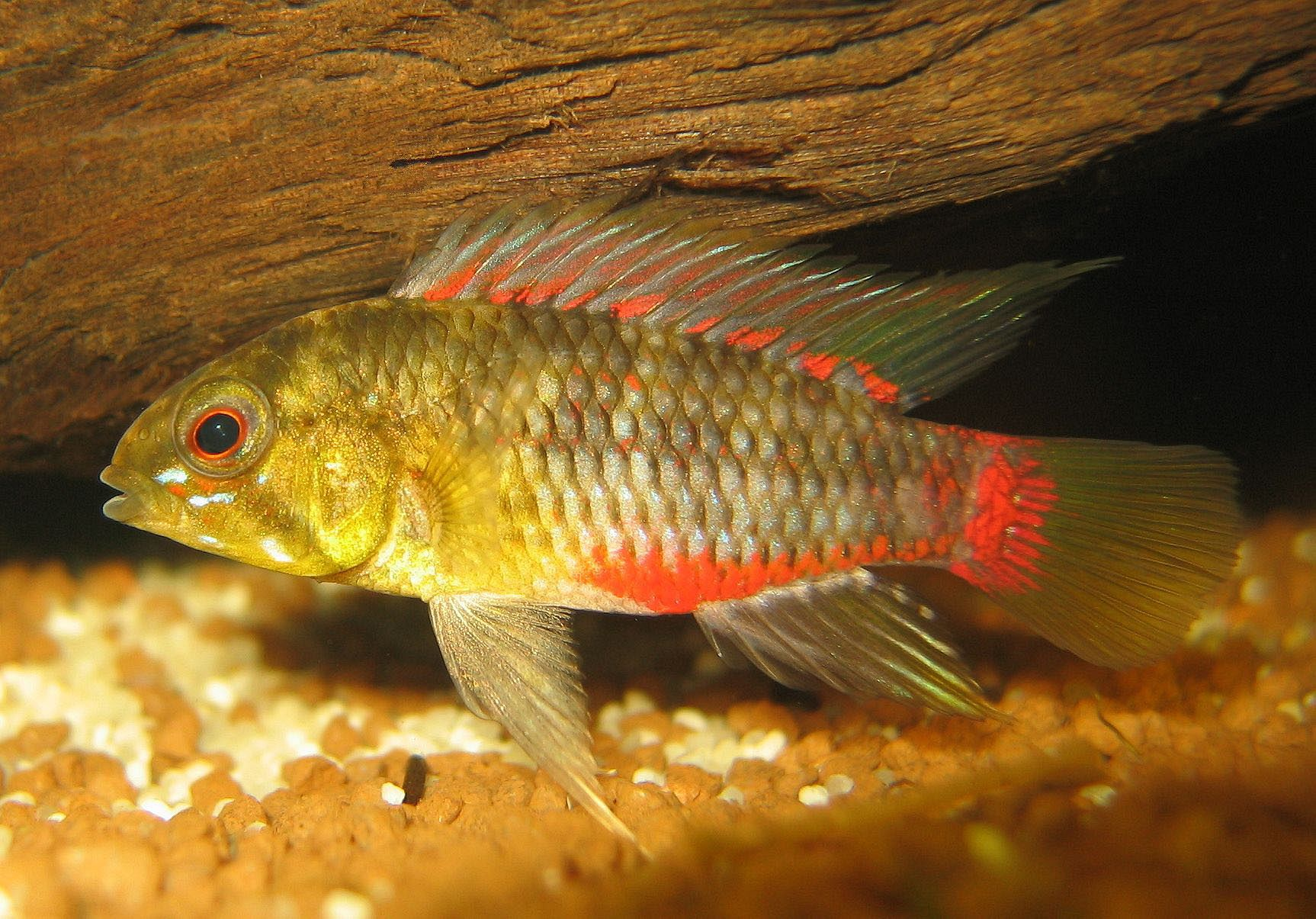
- Male

Conservation status
- Least Concern (IUCN 3.1)

Scientific classification
- Kingdom: Animalia
- Phylum: Chordata
- Class: Actinopterygii
- Order: Cichliformes
- Family: Cichlidae
- Genus: Apistogramma
- Species: A. hongsloi

Binomial name
- Apistogramma hongsloi S. O. Kullander, 1979

= Apistogramma hongsloi =

Species of fish

Apistogramma hongsloi is a species of dwarf cichlid fish, native to the Orinoco basin in South America. They are often kept in the aquariums and prefer to have soft, acidic water.

== Characteristics ==
It is one of the more colorful Apistogramma species in some of its color forms, which are the result of selective breeding by aquarists. The male has brighter colors than the female. The wild forms are infrequently seen in the aquarium trade, as they are not as colorful as the selectively bred strains. The wild forms are dark yellowish-brown in the dry season, but in the rainy season where they breed, their colors become brighter, including the red spot at the base of the tail.

== Range and habitat ==
This dwarf cichlid is found in the Orinoco basin in South America: along the middle Orinoco River, in the Vichada River drainage and the middle Meta River. They typically live in small, slow-moving spring-fed streams that receive plenty of sunlight, have a pH below 5 and a temperature between 26–28 °C (79–82 °F), but can thrive at pH 5.5–7 and 23–29 °C (73–84 °F).

== Breeding ==
Before spawning, females become bright yellow with black markings. A breeding female will place her eggs inside the roof of a cavity or underneath a leaf, laying between 50 and 100 eggs at a time. The female takes care of the eggs alone, while the male guards the territory. Females become very aggressive during breeding and will chase the male and other fish from their nest. The eggs are typically salmon colored. When spawning for the first time, some inexperienced females may consume their own eggs. When the eggs hatch, the fry stay close to the substrate and absorb the remnants of the egg yolk before becoming free-swimming. At this stage the fry will feed off of dead plants and other microorganisms. A female Apistogramma hongsloi is able to raise all of the fry by herself.

Female A. hongsloi guarding fry in freshwater aquarium.

== Aquaristics ==
Apistogramma hongsloi likes soft acidic water. They do well in planted tanks with leaf litter and/or driftwood which release tannins, which in turn lower the pH of the water. Like most Apistogramma species, A. hongsloi will sometimes lay eggs underneath leaves, driftwood, artificial caves, clay pots, or other secluded crevices inside an aquarium, given that all other breeding conditions are met, such as correct water parameters, adequate nutrition and appropriate choice of tankmates.

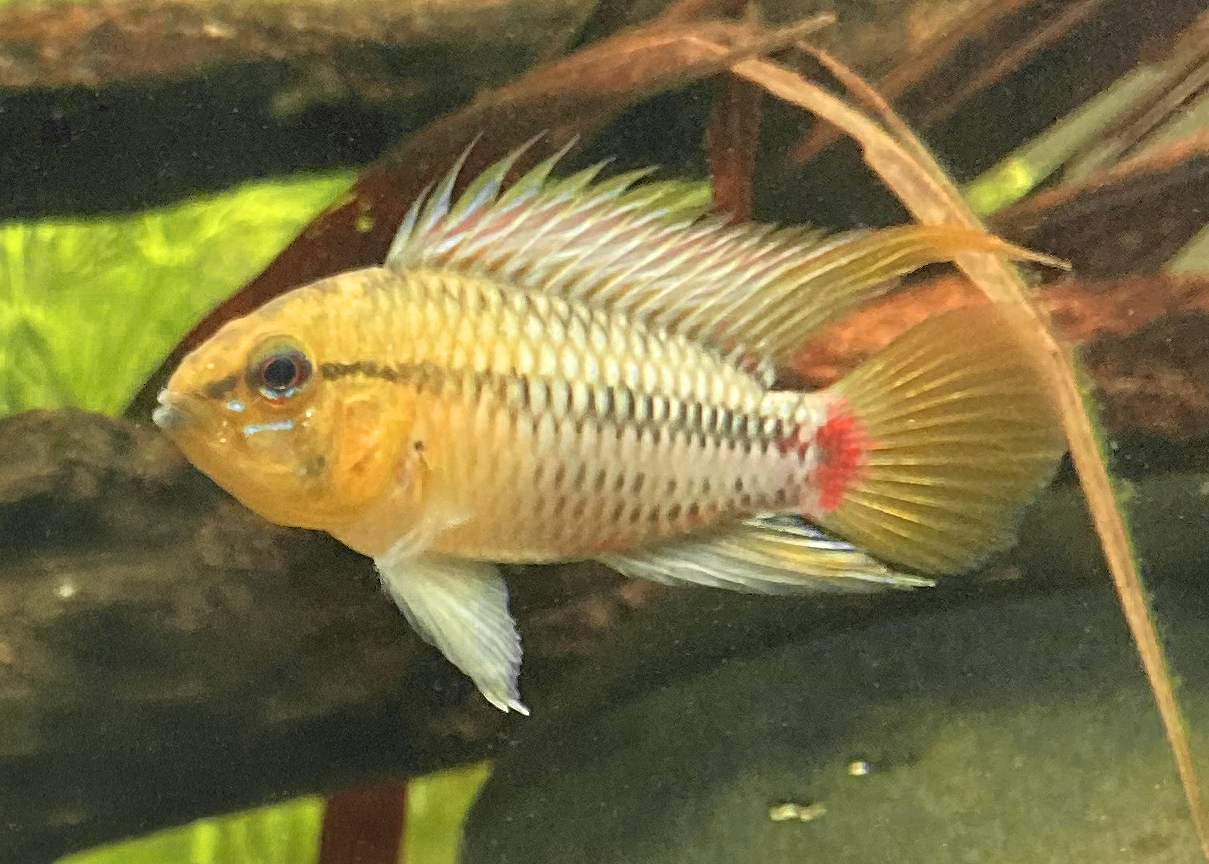
Male

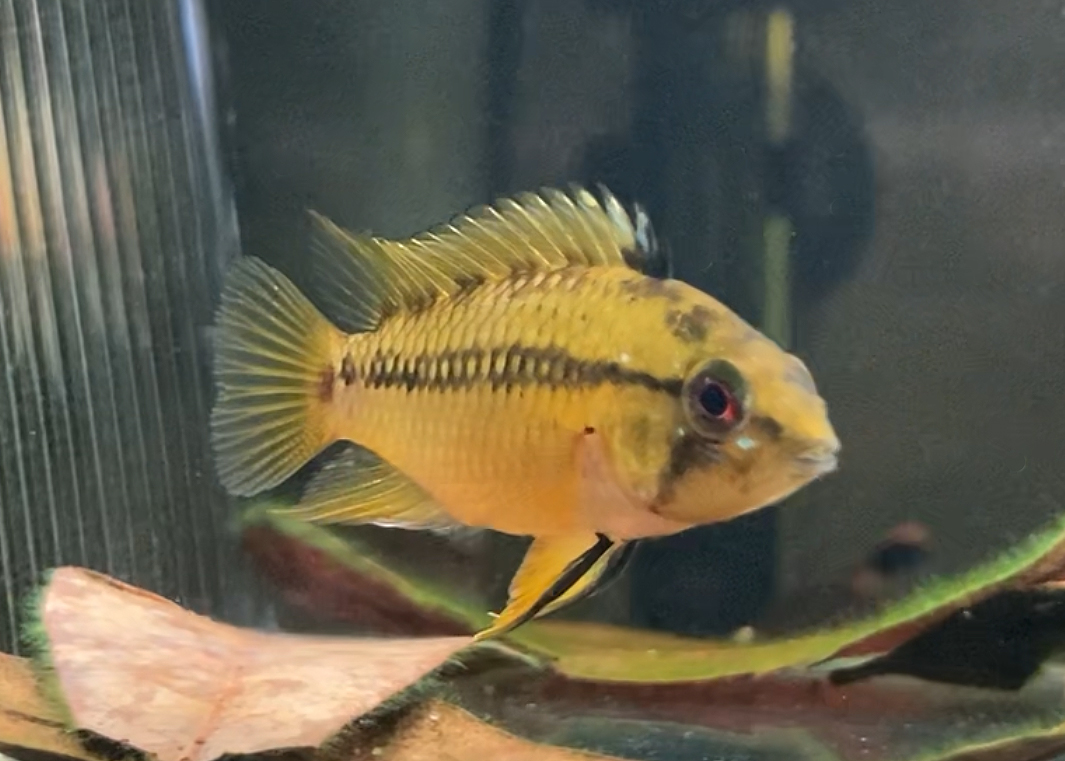
Female

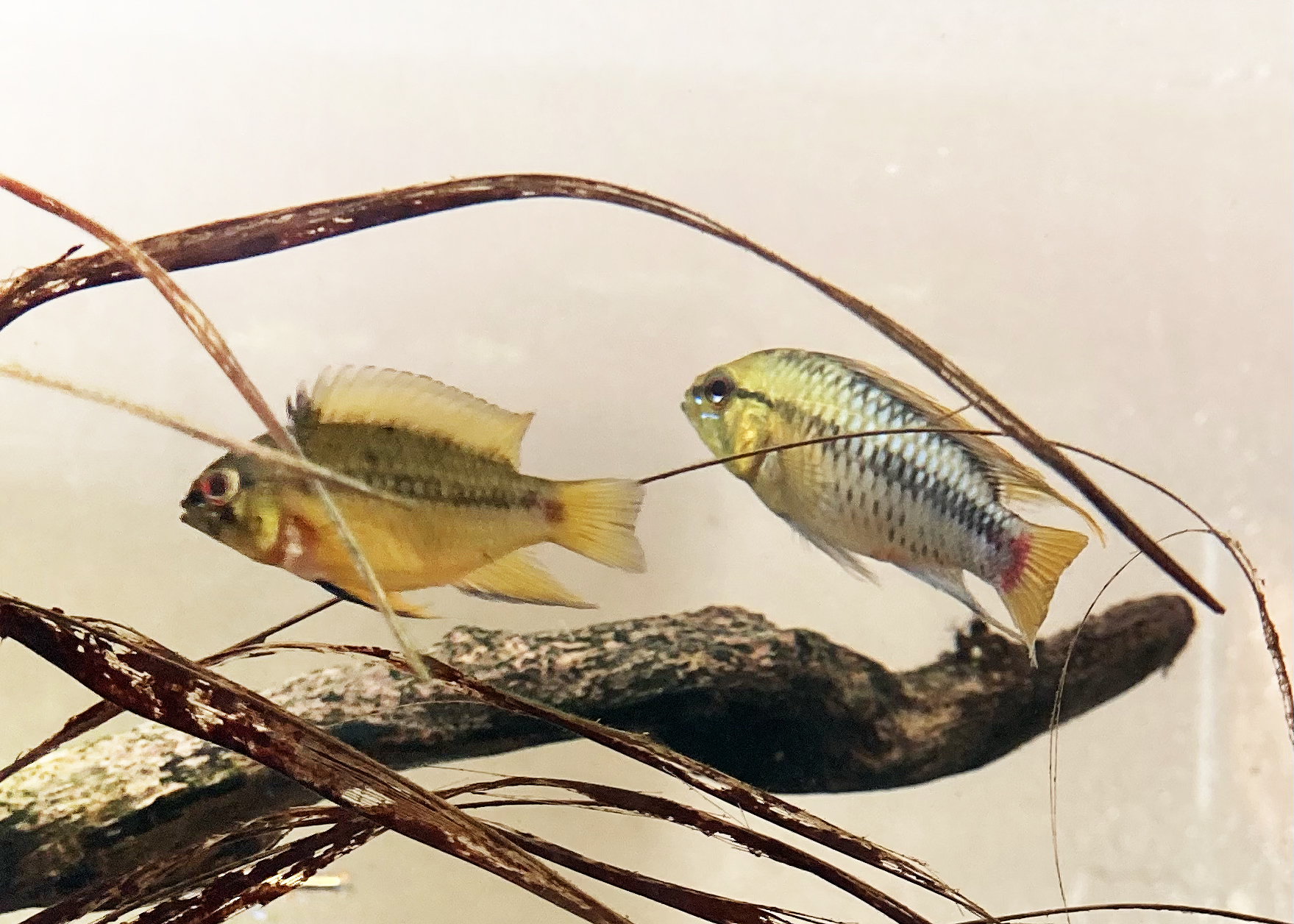
Breeding pair

== Name ==
In the specific name the author Sven O. Kullander is honouring the collector of the type, the aquarist and fish-disease specialist, Thorbjörn Hongslo of the National Veterinary Institute in Uppsala.
