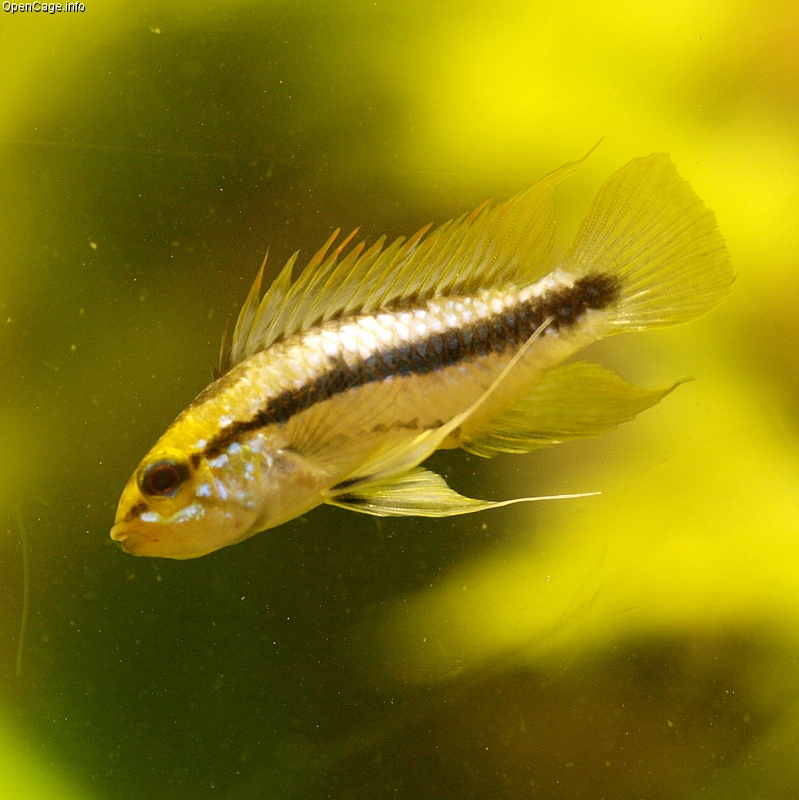
- Apistogramma trifasciata

Scientific classification
- Kingdom: Animalia
- Phylum: Chordata
- Class: Actinopterygii
- Division: Teleostei
- Order: Cichliformes
- Family: Cichlidae
- Genus: Apistogramma
- Species: A. trifasciata

Binomial name
- Apistogramma trifasciata (C. H. Eigenmann & Kennedy, 1903)

= Apistogramma trifasciata =

Species of fish

Apistogramma trifasciata, also known as three-striped dwarf cichlid, is a species of fish from the ‘Arroyo Chagalalina’ in Paraguay extending towards the rio Guaporé drainage in the southern Amazon basin though the connected rio Paraguay watershed in Brazil and Paraguay and on as far as the middle Paraná basin in Argentina.
