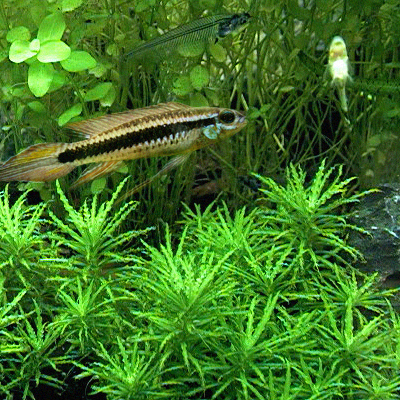

Scientific classification
- Domain: Eukaryota
- Kingdom: Animalia
- Phylum: Chordata
- Class: Actinopterygii
- Order: Cichliformes
- Family: Cichlidae
- Genus: Taeniacara
- Species: T. candidi

Binomial name
- Taeniacara candidi G. S. Myers, 1935

Synonyms
- Apistogramma weisei Ahl, 1936

= Taeniacara candidi =

Species of fish

Taeniacara candidi is a species of cichlid fish from the Amazon Basin in South America. This species is considered a dwarf cichlid in which reaches a length of 5 centimetres (2.0 in) TL. This species can also be found in the aquarium trade, but requires very soft, acidic water and is known for being unexpectedly aggressive for a fish its size; a male will usually kill any other males in a tank shorter than 4 feet in length.
