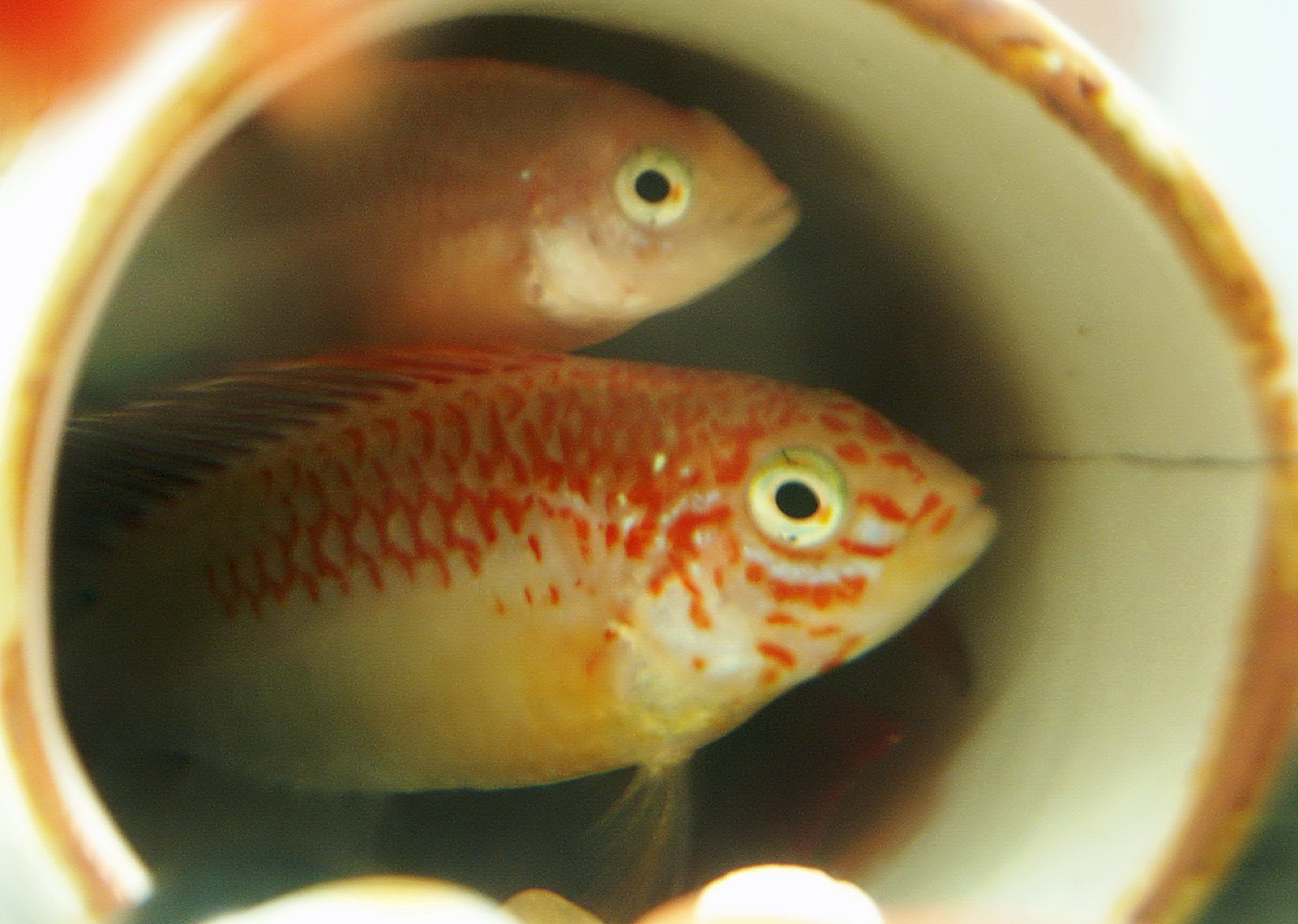

Scientific classification
- Kingdom: Animalia
- Phylum: Chordata
- Class: Actinopterygii
- Order: Cichliformes
- Family: Cichlidae
- Genus: Apistogramma
- Species: A. viejita

Binomial name
- Apistogramma viejita S. O. Kullander, 1979

= Apistogramma viejita =

Species of fish of Colombia

Apistogramma viejita is a dwarf cichlid in the subfamily Cichlinae, in the tribe Geophagini. It is a benthopelagic freshwater fish that lives in the Meta River and the Orinoco River in Colombia. They grow up to 4.6 cm in standard length.

The males gather harems for spawning if there is an excess number of females. The clutch of up to 100 eggs is deposited on the ceiling of a cave and is tended by the female parent.

Apistogramma macmasteri is often mislabelled as Apistogramma viejita by shops. In fact, the latter is a very rare fish which is not regularly bred and thus is not commonly available in the trade. Generally, apistogramma labelled as viejita colour forms are domestic strains of A. macmasteri, some examples of this are "Red Face", "Red Mask", and "Red shoulder".

In the specific name, the author, Sven O. Kullander, is referencing the use of the Spanish word vieja, meaning "old lady", for many species of cichlids in South America. The diminutive viejita is used for the smaller cichlids in eastern Colombia, although Kullander does not reveal why this is the case.
