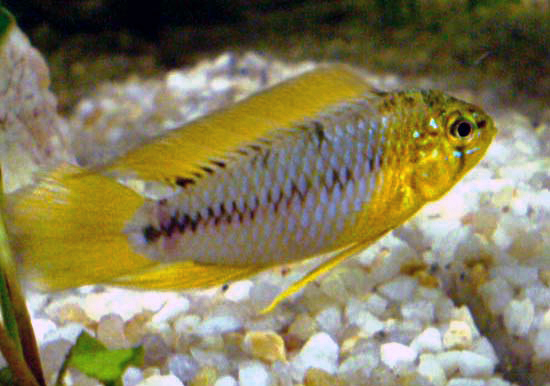

Conservation status
- Least Concern (IUCN 3.1)

Scientific classification
- Kingdom: Animalia
- Phylum: Chordata
- Class: Actinopterygii
- Order: Cichliformes
- Family: Cichlidae
- Genus: Apistogramma
- Species: A. borellii

Binomial name
- Apistogramma borellii (Regan, 1906)

Synonyms
- Heterogramma borellii Regan, 1906; Heterogramma ritense Haseman, 1911; Heterogramma rondoni Miranda-Ribeiro, 1918; Apistogramma aequipinnis Ahl, 1938; Apistogramma reitzigi Mitsch, 1938

= Apistogramma borellii =

Species of fish

Apistogramma borellii, common names umbrella cichlid, umbrella apisto and yellow dwarf cichlid, is a species of fish in the genus Apistogramma.

It is a South American dwarf cichlid, found in the Paraguay River and Paraná River. They are found further south than most other members of the genus and can thus tolerate cooler temperatures. The umbrella cichlid eats insects and crustaceans. The specific name honours the zoologist Alfredo Borelli (1858–1943), who collected the type.

== Breeding ==
Like most Apistogramma species, A. borellii are cave spawners, and in the wild breed during the rainy season due to the influx of food. To breed them in aquaria, many fishkeepers use Indian almond leaves or another method to increase tannins to simulate the flooded banks of their wild habitat. Feeding rich foods like bloodworms or brine shrimp also helps. The female will lure the male into the cave, and then after spawning she will kick him out and fan the eggs for 36 hours until they hatch. Upon the eggs hatching, the female will guard them closely until they grow up.

== Gallery ==
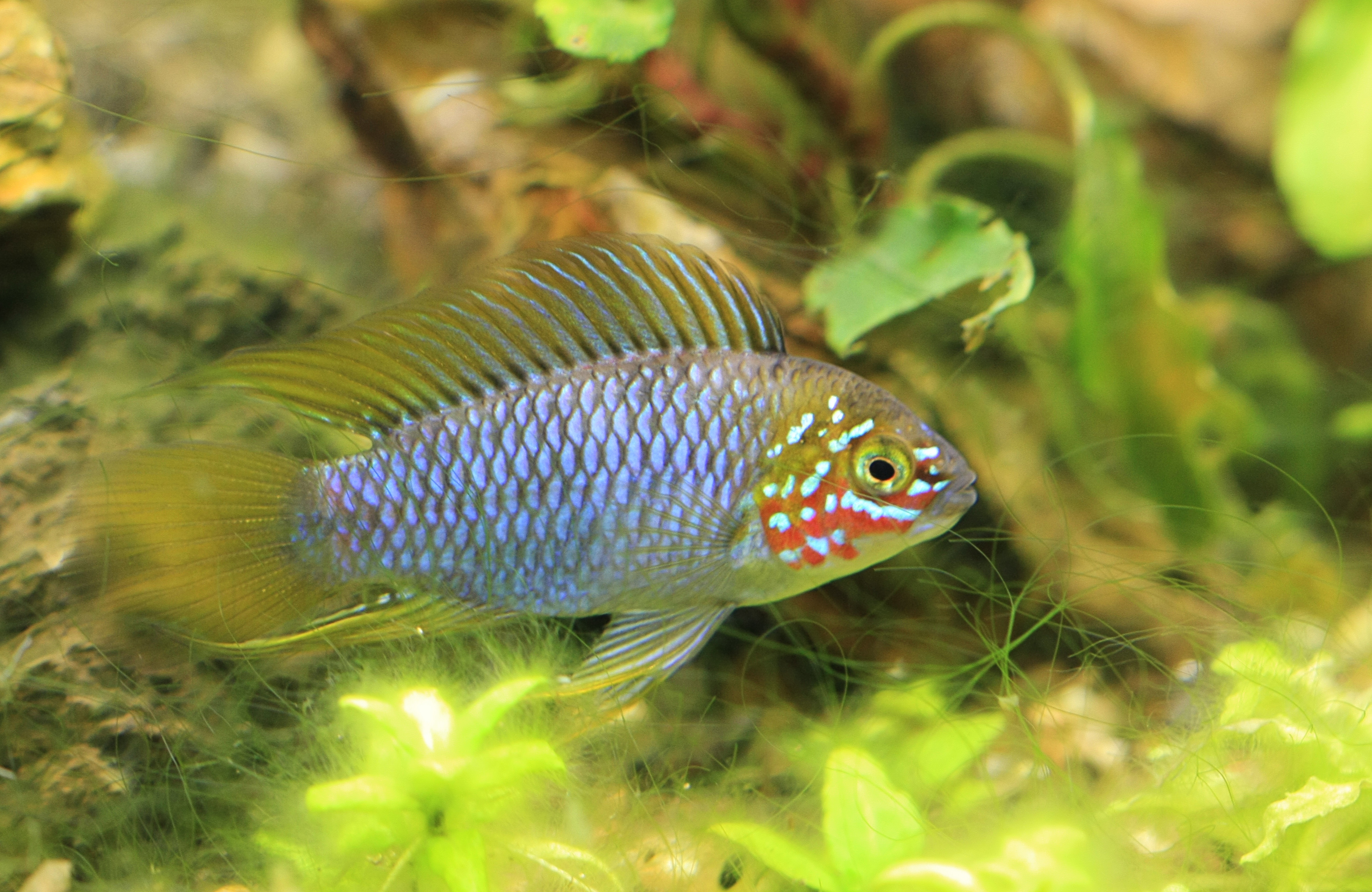
A male Apistogramma borellii "Opal"

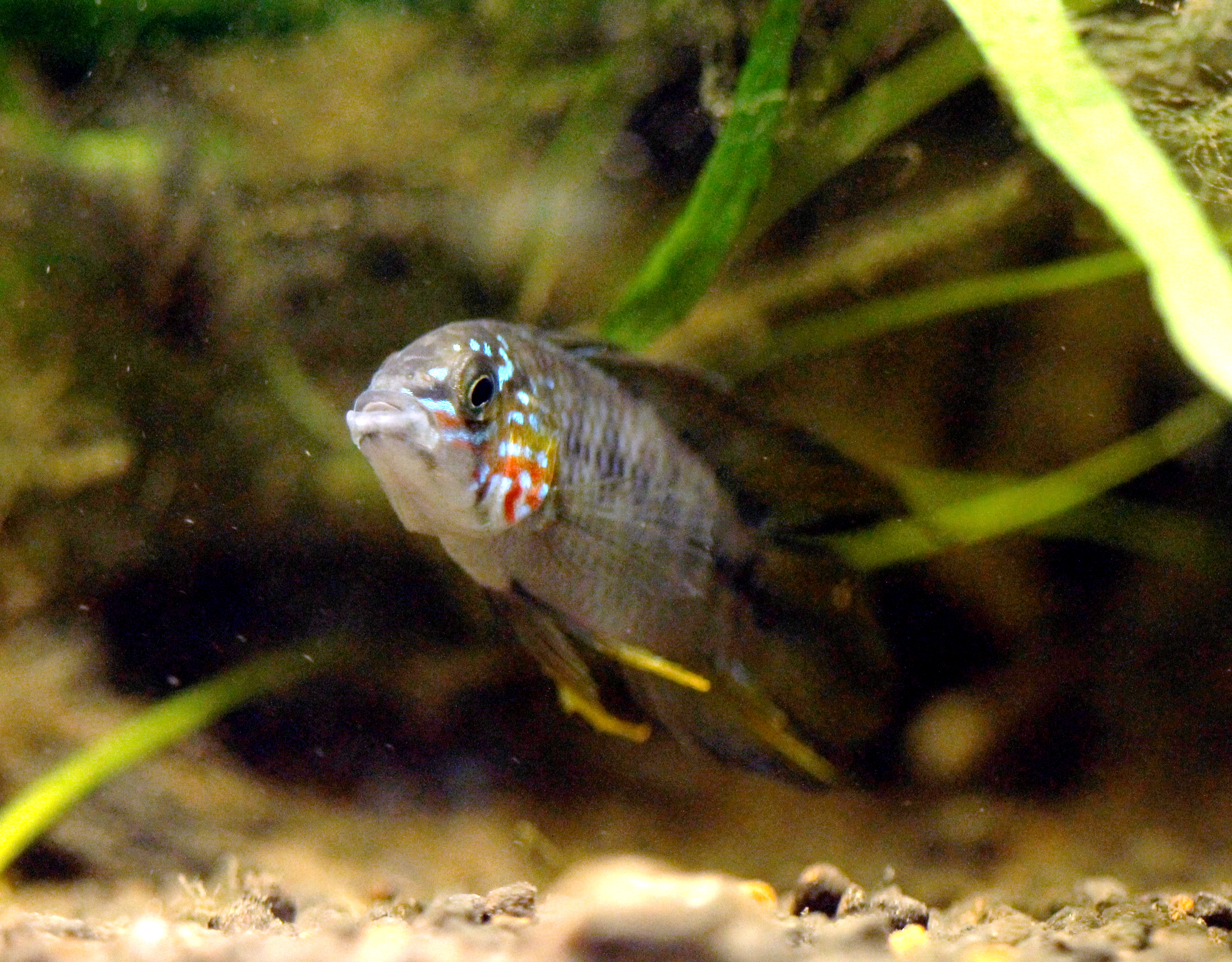
A male Apistogramma borellii "Opal"

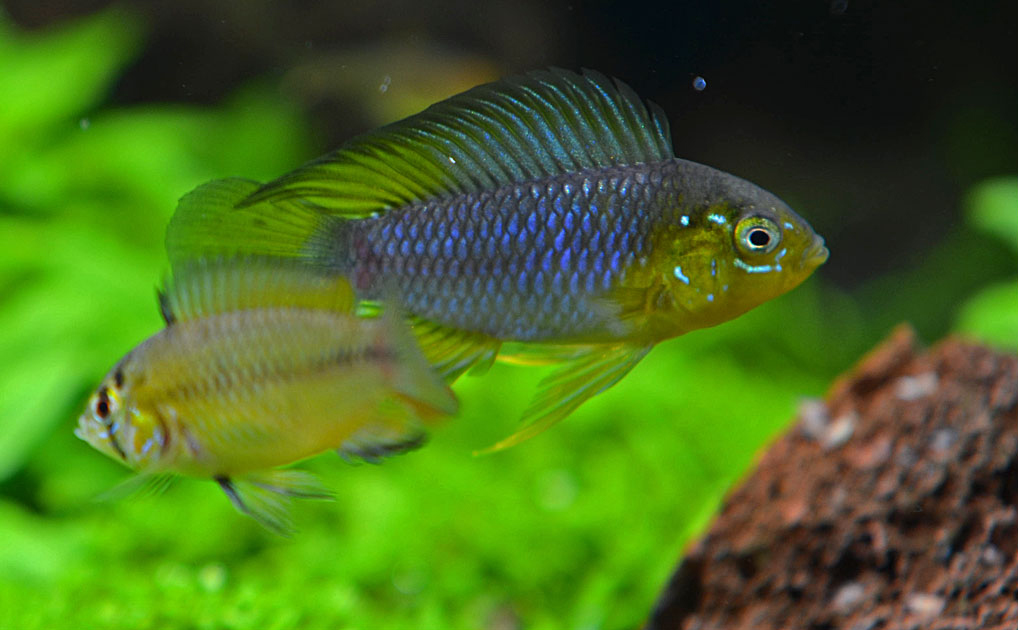
An Apistogramma borellii pair during a courtship ritual
