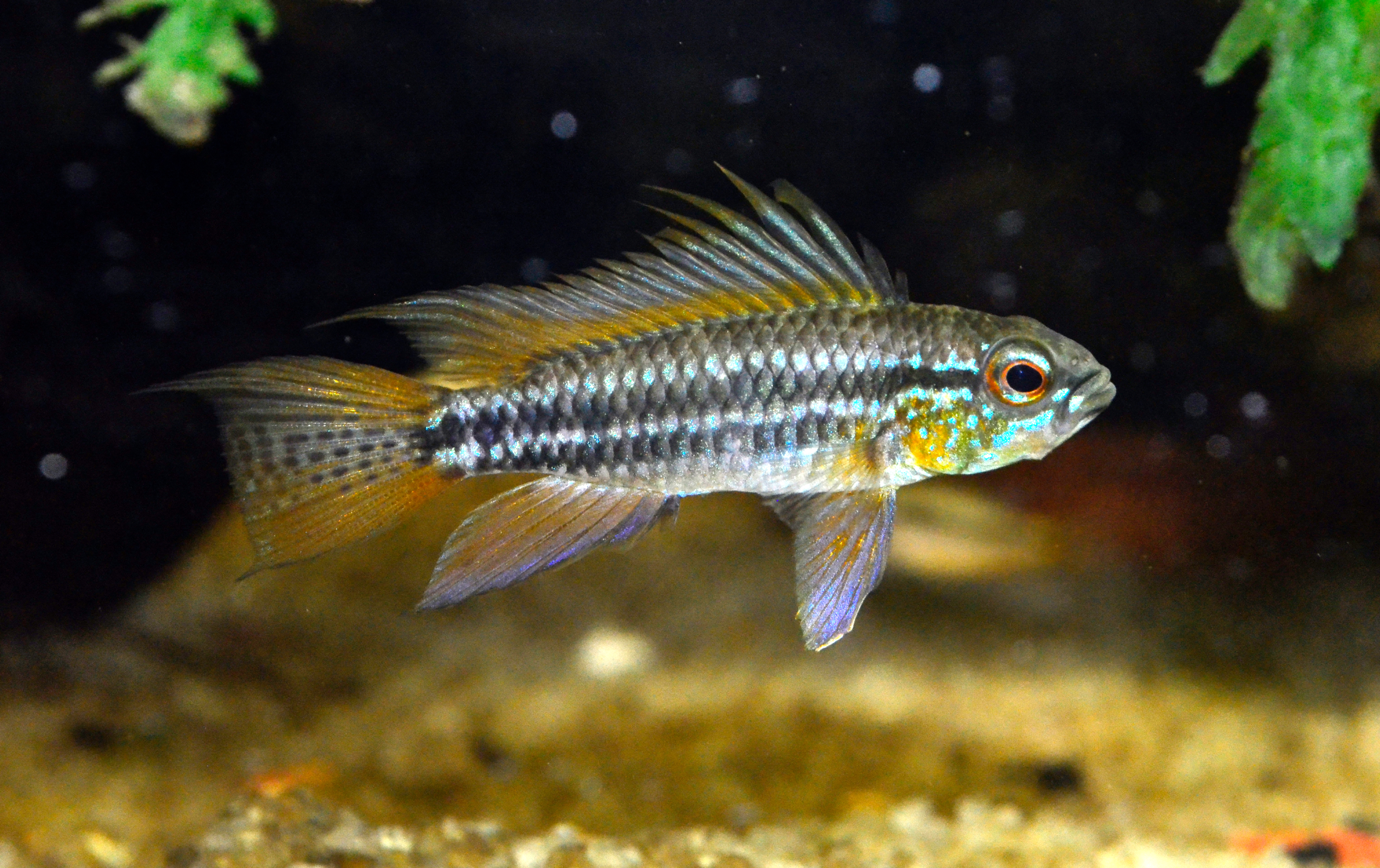

Conservation status
- Least Concern (IUCN 3.1)

Scientific classification
- Kingdom: Animalia
- Phylum: Chordata
- Class: Actinopterygii
- Order: Cichliformes
- Family: Cichlidae
- Genus: Apistogramma
- Species: A. bitaeniata

Binomial name
- Apistogramma bitaeniata Pellegrin, 1936

Synonyms
- Apistogramma sweglesi

= Banded dwarf cichlid =

Species of fish

Banded dwarf cichlid (Apistogramma bitaeniata) is a species of benthopelagic freshwater fish from South America. It is a popular dwarf cichlid among fishkeepers.

It is found in blackwater rivers of the Amazon Basin in Brazil and Peru.
