= Ingo Hahn =

German politician (born 1971)

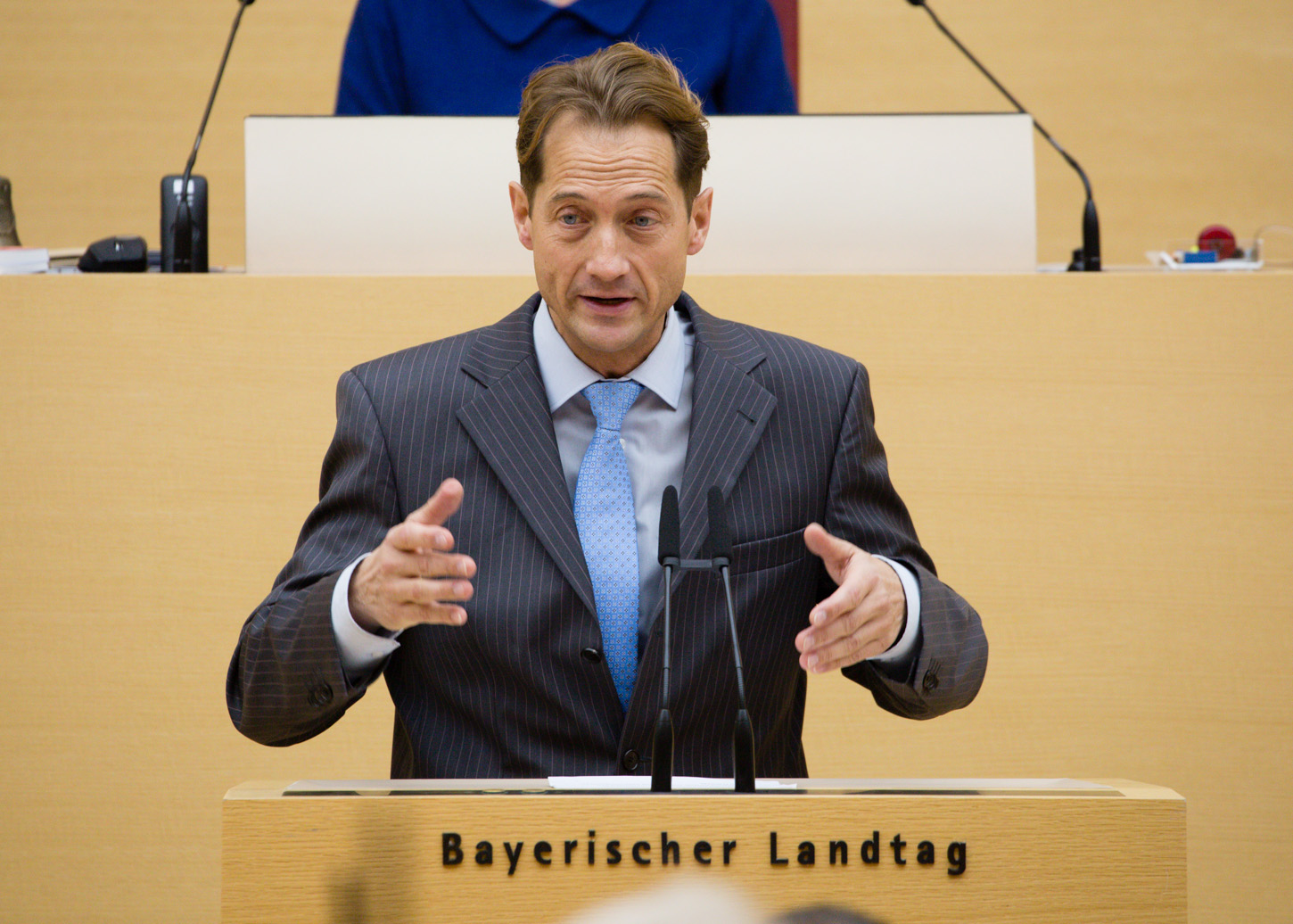
- Hahn in 2023

Member of the Bundestag
- Incumbent
- Assumed office 25 March 2025
- Constituency: Bavaria

Member of the Landtag of Bavaria
- In office 5 November 2018 – 27 March 2025
- Succeeded by: Christin Gmelch

Personal details
- Born: 28 January 1971 (age 55) Groß-Gerau
- Party: Alternative for Germany (since 2014)

Ingo Jochen Hahn (born 28 January 1971 in Groß-Gerau) is a German politician who was elected as a member of the Bundestag in 2025. From 2018 to 2025, he was a member of the Landtag of Bavaria.
