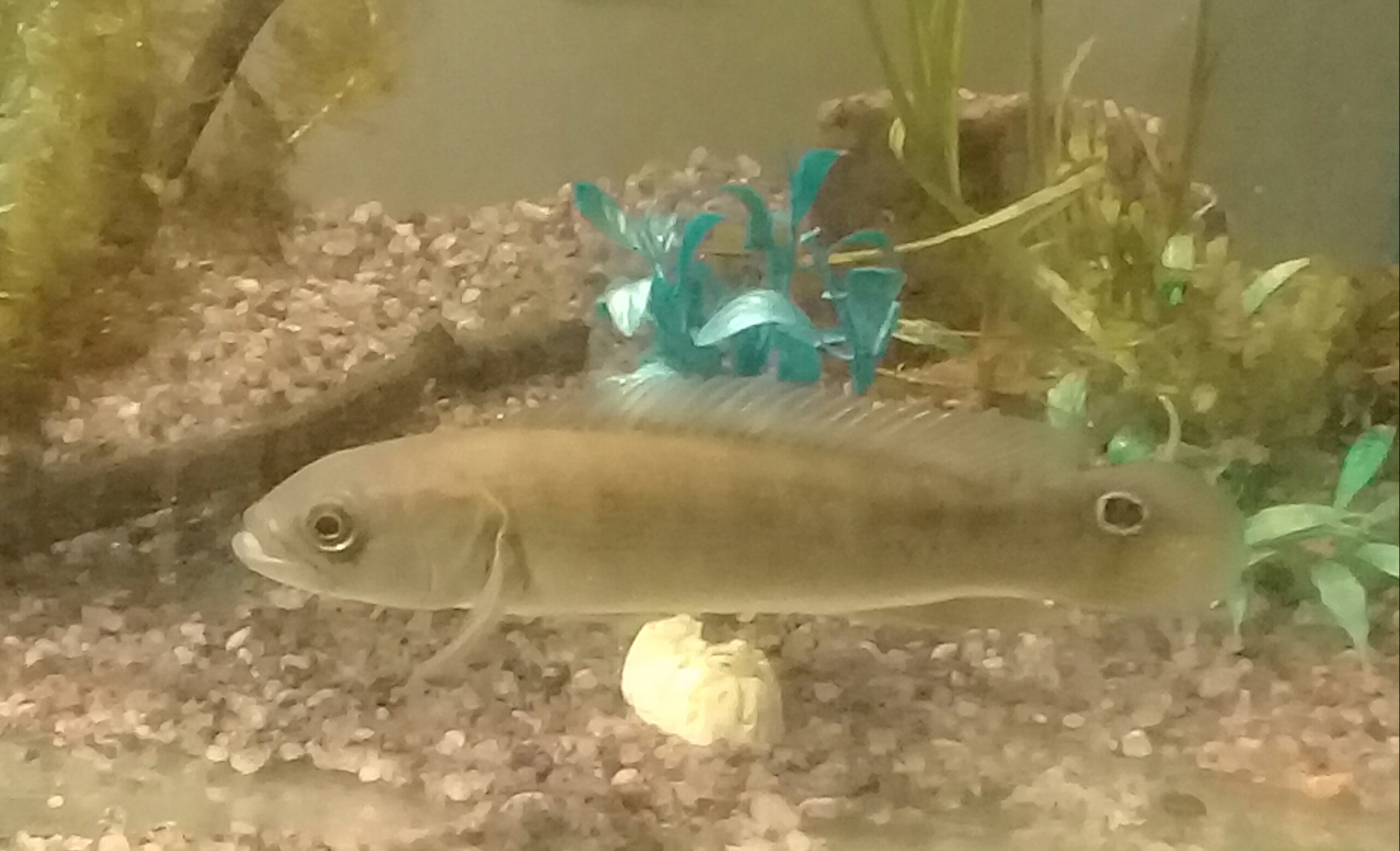
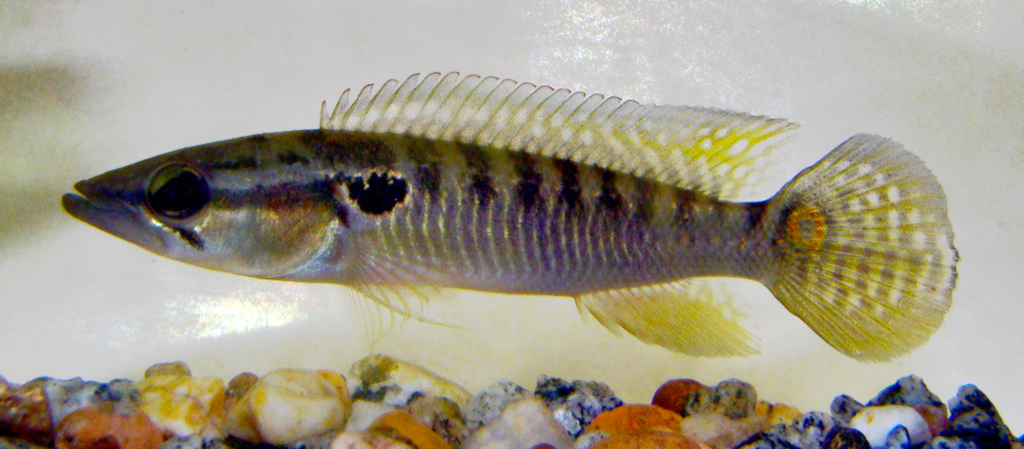
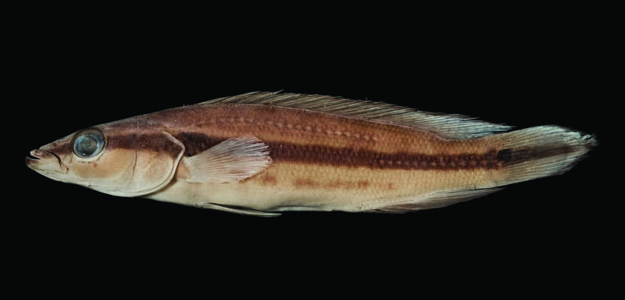
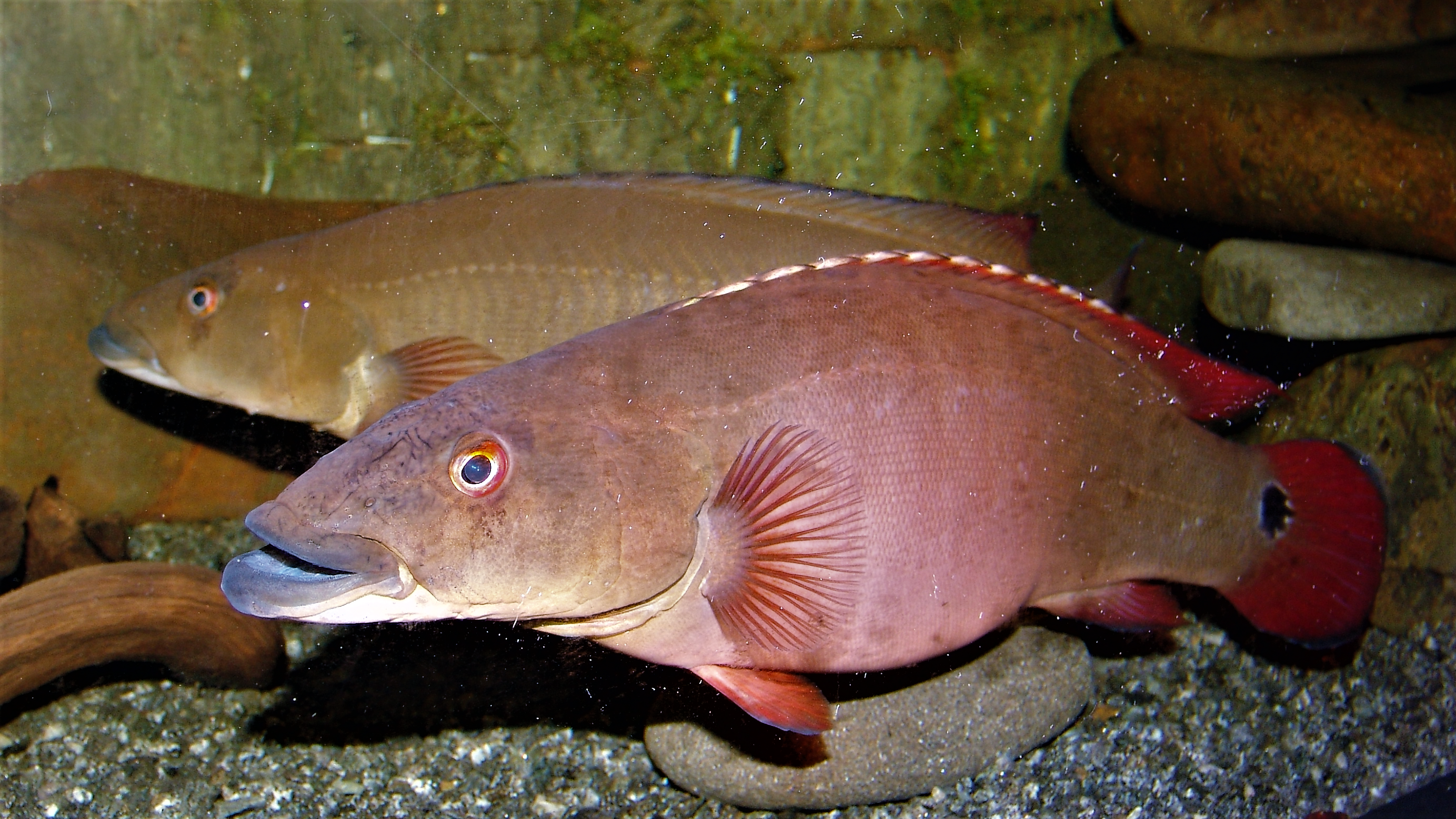
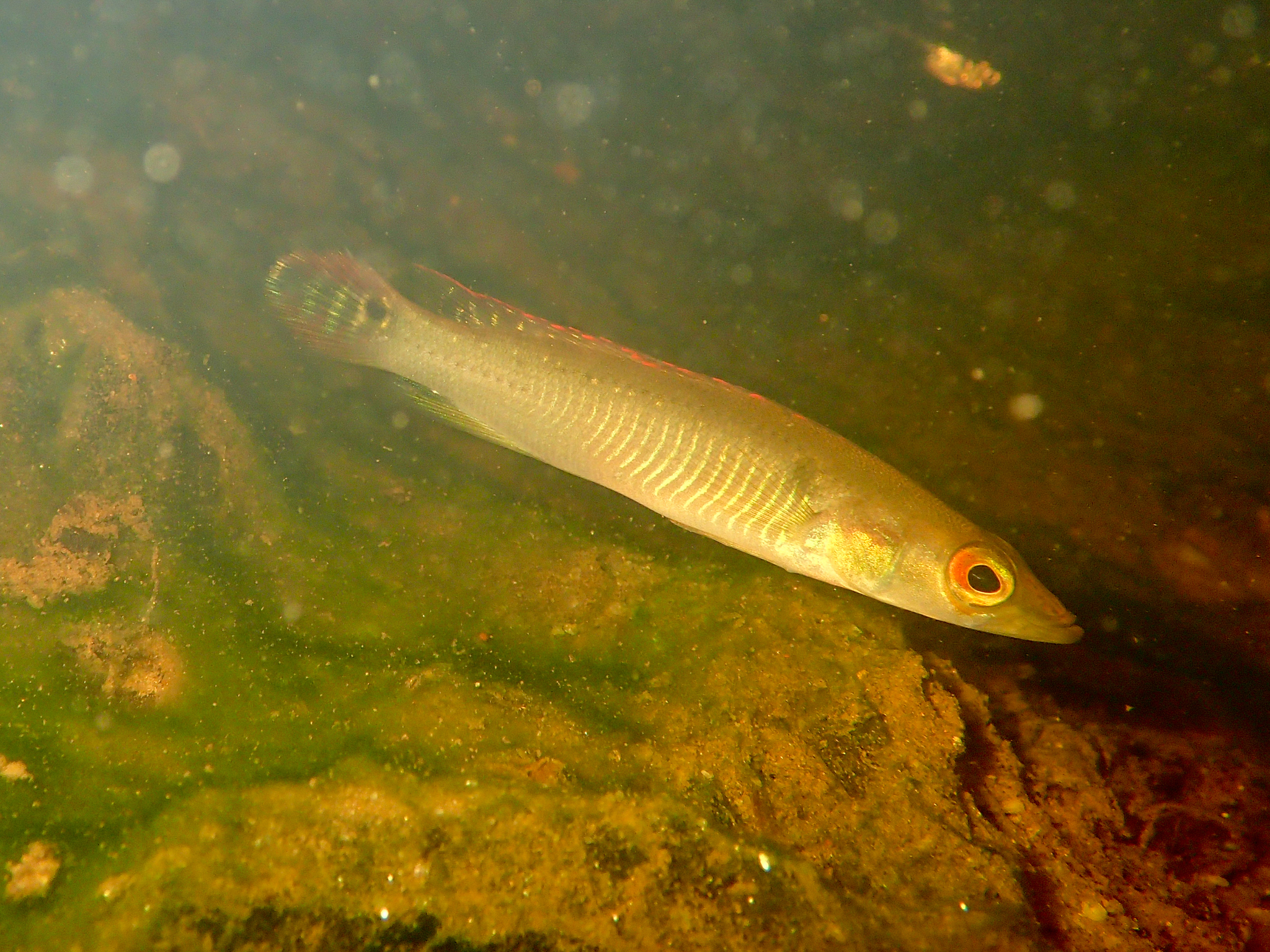
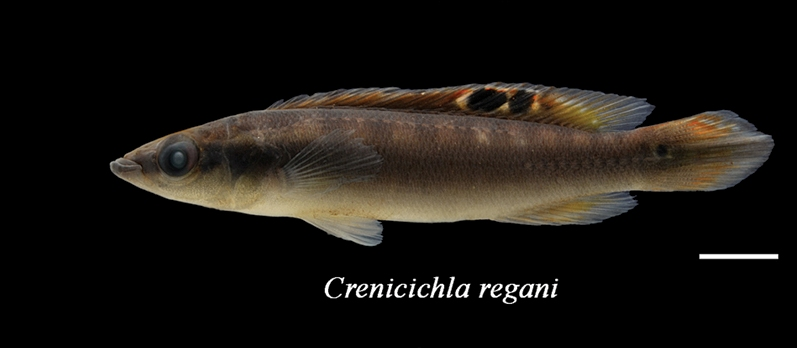
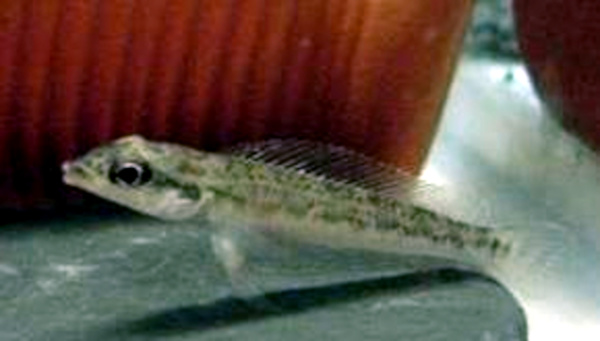
- Crenicichla (Batrachops) semifasciata Crenicichla (Lacustria) punctata Hemeraia hemera Lugubria lugubris Saxatilia saxatilis Wallaciia regani Teleocichla cinderella Representative taxa from the clades of Crenicichlina (minus the type species of the type genus)

Scientific classification
- Kingdom: Animalia
- Phylum: Chordata
- Class: Actinopterygii
- Order: Cichliformes
- Family: Cichlidae
- Tribe: Geophagini
- Subtribe: Crenicaratina

Groups included
- Crenicichla; Hemeraia; Lugubria; Saxatilia; Wallaciia

Cladistically included but traditionally excluded taxa
- Teleocichla

= Pike cichlid =

Pike cichlids

Grouping of South American cichlid fish

Pike cichlids are South American cichlid fish of the subfamily Cichlinae, all possessing an elongated body which drew comparison to pikes (Esox). The two earliest genera which were erected by Johann Jakob Heckel were Batrachops and Crenicichla. All subsequent species of elongated, small-scaled cichlid from South America were all placed within the genus Crenicichla (which also absorbed the genera Batrachops and Boggiania), but they eventually were split out in a 2023 taxonomic revision. The same study also proposed the new subtribe Crenicichlina to encompass these genera of pike cichlids, though online authorities such as WoRMS and ECoF has not validated this classification system.

Crenicichlina is defined by a number of synapomorphies (distinguishing, unique traits), such as characters of the palatine, branchials, and basipterygium.

The following cladogram is based on a maximum likelihood phylogenetic tree from the 2023 taxonomic revision:

- Chaetobranchus
- Geophagini
  - - - Crenicara
      - Dicrossus
    - - Mikrogeophagus
      - - Biotodoma
        - Geophagus
  - - Mazarunia
    - - - Satanoperca
        - - Taeniacara
          - Apistogramma
      - - - Acarichthys
          - Biotoecus
        - Crenicichlina
          - - - Wallaciia
              - Teleocichla
            - - - Hemeraia
                - Saxatilia
              - Lugubria
          - Crenicichla
            - Crenicichla macrophthalma (type species)
            - - subgenus Batrachops
              - subgenus Lacustria
