= Yaha =

Yaha may refer to:

== People ==
- Abdelhafidh Yaha, Algerian revolutionary
- Fouad Yaha (born 1996), French rugby league player

== Other uses ==
- Yaha district, district in Thailand
- Crenicichla yaha, species of cichlid
