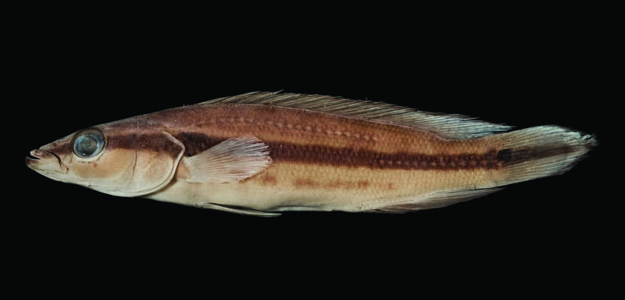
- Hemeraia hemera, the type species of the genus

Scientific classification
- Kingdom: Animalia
- Phylum: Chordata
- Class: Actinopterygii
- Order: Cichliformes
- Family: Cichlidae
- Subfamily: Cichlinae
- Tribe: Geophagini
- Genus: Hemeraia; Varella, Kullander, Menezes, López-Fernández & Oliveira, 2023

Type species
- Crenicichla hemera Kullander, 1990

= Hemeraia =

Genus of fishes

Hemeraia is a South American cichlid genus in the tribe Geophagini. The genus was only newly introduced in mid-2023 by four South American ichthyologists and their Swedish colleague S. O. Kullander. Previously, the species placed in Hemeraia belonged to the genus Crenicichla. There are two species, one of which (Hemeraia hemera) occurs in the catchment area of the Rio Aripuanã and the other (H. chicha) in the catchment area of the Rio Juruena, a headwater of the Rio Tapajós.

== Characteristics ==
Like all pike cichlids, the Hemeraia species have a pike-like, elongated body. The number of vertebrae is high and there are more trunk vertebrae than caudal vertebrae, or their number is equal, while in most other cichlid genera it is the other way around. Hemeraia species are medium-sized pike cichlids and reach a standard length of 13.8 to 23.2 centimetres (5.4 to 9.1 in). Their pelvic fins are short and rounded. The second fin ray is the longest; however, it does not reach the genital papilla. On the sides of the body, the areas covered with ctenoid scales are smaller than in other pike cichlids. Instead, the regions covered with cycloid scales are more extensive. The edge of the preoperculum is smooth. The infraorbitals 4 and 5 (bones below the eye socket) are fused and provided with a central sensory spore. Compared to Lugubria, Hemeraia species have fewer scales arranged in a row along the body. Hemeraia differs from Saxatilia by the absence of a dark spot above the pectoral fin base. However, in adult H. hemera a dark spot is present in front of the pectoral fin base. The genus Teleocichla, in which the infraorbitals 4 and 5 are also fused together and the edge of the preoperculum is also smooth, differs from Hemeraia in that it has an inferior mouth and various adaptations to life in fast-flowing waters.

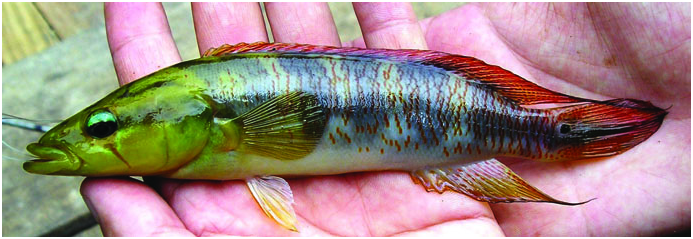
Hemeraia chicha

== Species ==
The following species belong to the genus Hemeraia:

- Hemeraia chicha (Varella, Kullander & Lima, 2012)
- Hemeraia hemera (Kullander, 1990)
