= Crenicichla prenda =

Conservation status
- Near Threatened (IUCN 3.1)

Scientific classification
- Kingdom: Animalia
- Phylum: Chordata
- Class: Actinopterygii
- Order: Cichliformes
- Family: Cichlidae
- Genus: Crenicichla
- Species: C. prenda

Binomial name
- Crenicichla prenda C. A. S. de Lucena & S. O. Kullander, 1992

Species of fish

Crenicichla prenda is a species of cichlid native to South America. It is found in the upper Uruguay River basin. This species reaches a length of 8.7 cm (3.4 in).
