= Crenicichla sedentaria =

Scientific classification
- Kingdom: Animalia
- Phylum: Chordata
- Class: Actinopterygii
- Order: Cichliformes
- Family: Cichlidae
- Genus: Crenicichla
- Species: C. sedentaria

Binomial name
- Crenicichla sedentaria S. O. Kullander, 1986

Species of fish

Crenicichla sedentaria is a species of cichlid native to South America. It is found in the Amazon River basin, in the upper Ucayali River drainage, upper Huallaga River drainage near Tingo María in Peru, and the Napo and Putumayo River drainages in Ecuador. This species reaches a length of 22.1 cm (8.7 in).
