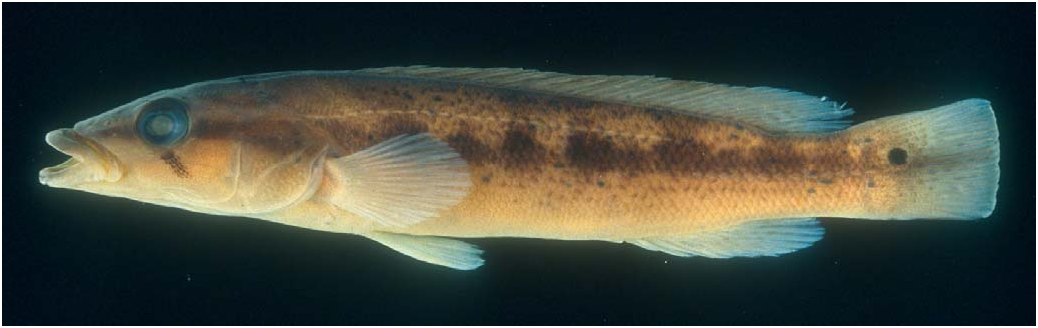

Scientific classification
- Kingdom: Animalia
- Phylum: Chordata
- Class: Actinopterygii
- Order: Cichliformes
- Family: Cichlidae
- Genus: Crenicichla
- Species: C. maculata

Binomial name
- Crenicichla maculata S. O. Kullander & C. A. S. de Lucena, 2006

= Crenicichla maculata =

Species of fish

Crenicichla maculata is a species of cichlid native to South America. It is found in Brazil. This species reaches a length of 24.7 cm (9.7 in).
