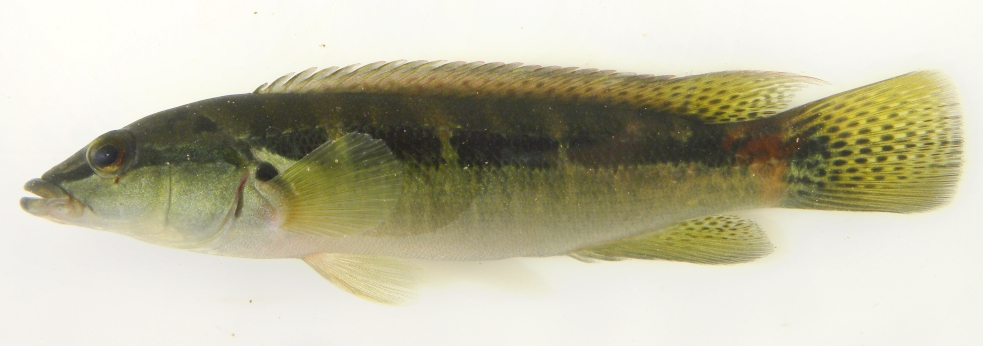

Scientific classification
- Kingdom: Animalia
- Phylum: Chordata
- Class: Actinopterygii
- Order: Cichliformes
- Family: Cichlidae
- Genus: Crenicichla
- Species: C. minuano

Binomial name
- Crenicichla minuano C. A. S. de Lucena & S. O. Kullander, 1992

= Crenicichla minuano =

Species of fish

Crenicichla minuano is a species of cichlid native to South America. It is found in the Uruguay River drainage, in tributaries of the middle an upper Uruguay River. This species reaches a length of 26 cm (10 in).
