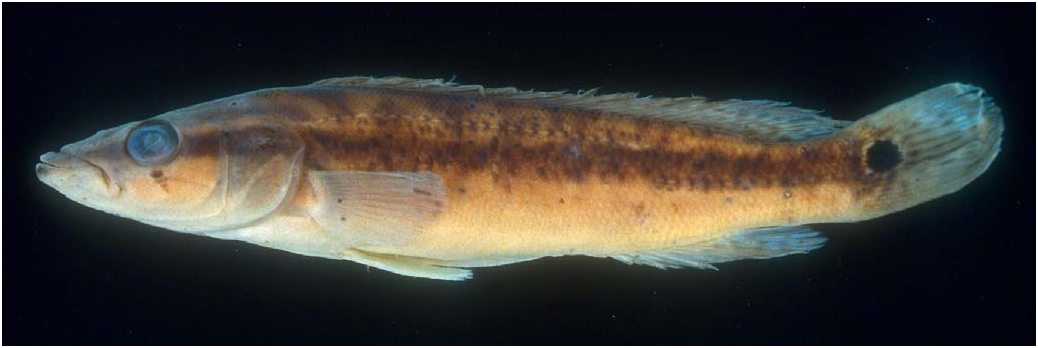

Scientific classification
- Kingdom: Animalia
- Phylum: Chordata
- Class: Actinopterygii
- Order: Cichliformes
- Family: Cichlidae
- Genus: Crenicichla
- Species: C. tingui

Binomial name
- Crenicichla tingui C. A. S. de Lucena & S. O. Kullander, 2006

= Crenicichla tingui =

Species of fish

Crenicichla tingui is a species of cichlid native to South America, found in Brazil. This species reaches a length of 19.5 cm (7.7 in).
