= Crenicichla gaucho =

Scientific classification
- Kingdom: Animalia
- Phylum: Chordata
- Class: Actinopterygii
- Order: Cichliformes
- Family: Cichlidae
- Genus: Crenicichla
- Species: C. gaucho

Binomial name
- Crenicichla gaucho C. A. S. de Lucena & S. O. Kullander, 1992

Species of fish

Crenicichla gaucho is a species of cichlid native to South America. It is found in the Uruguay River drainage, in the tributaries of the middle Uruguay River ie. Comandaí, Ijuí and Piratinim rivers. This species reaches a length of 12.7 cm (5.0 in).

The name comes from gaúcho, the local Brazilian name for a cowboy, referring to its distribution in the traditional south Brazilian cattle ranching districts.
