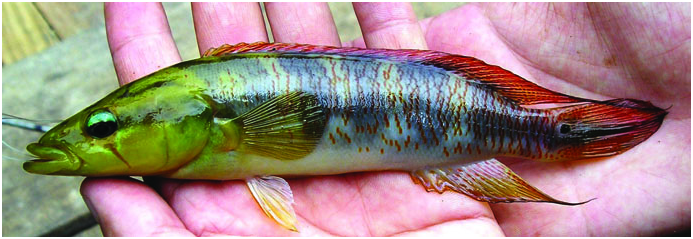

Conservation status
- Least Concern (IUCN 3.1)

Scientific classification
- Kingdom: Animalia
- Phylum: Chordata
- Class: Actinopterygii
- Order: Cichliformes
- Family: Cichlidae
- Genus: Hemeraia
- Species: H. chicha

Binomial name
- Hemeraia chicha (H. R. Varella, S. O. Kullander & F. C. T. Lima, 2012)

Synonyms
- Crenicichla chicha

= Hemeraia chicha =

Species of fish

Hemeraia chicha is a species of cichlid native to South America. It is found in the Rio Papagaio, upper rio Tapajós basin, Mato Grosso, Brazil. This species reaches a length of 13.8 cm (5.4 in).
