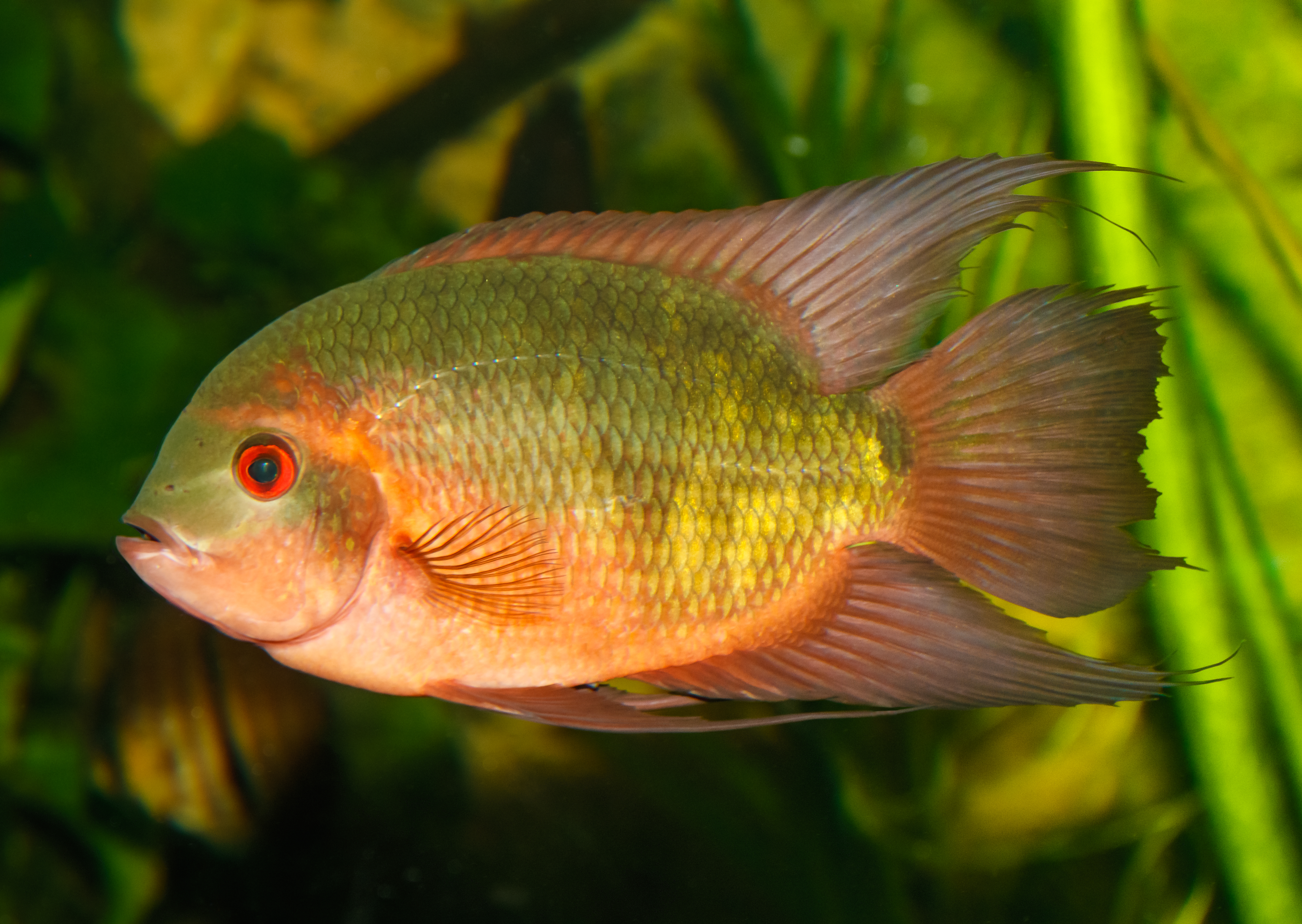
- Emerald cichlid (H. temporalis)

Scientific classification
- Kingdom: Animalia
- Phylum: Chordata
- Class: Actinopterygii
- Division: Teleostei
- Order: Cichliformes
- Family: Cichlidae
- Subfamily: Cichlinae
- Tribe: Heroini
- Genus: Hypselecara; S. O. Kullander, 1986

Type species
- Heros temporalis Günther, 1862

= Hypselecara =

Genus of fishes

Hypselecara is a small genus of cichlids native to the Amazon and Orinoco basins in South America. H. temporalis is a relatively common aquarium fish known in the aquarium trade as the chocolate cichlid.

== Species ==
There are currently two recognized species in this genus:

- Hypselecara coryphaenoides (Heckel, 1840)
- Hypselecara temporalis (Günther, 1862) (Emerald cichlid)
