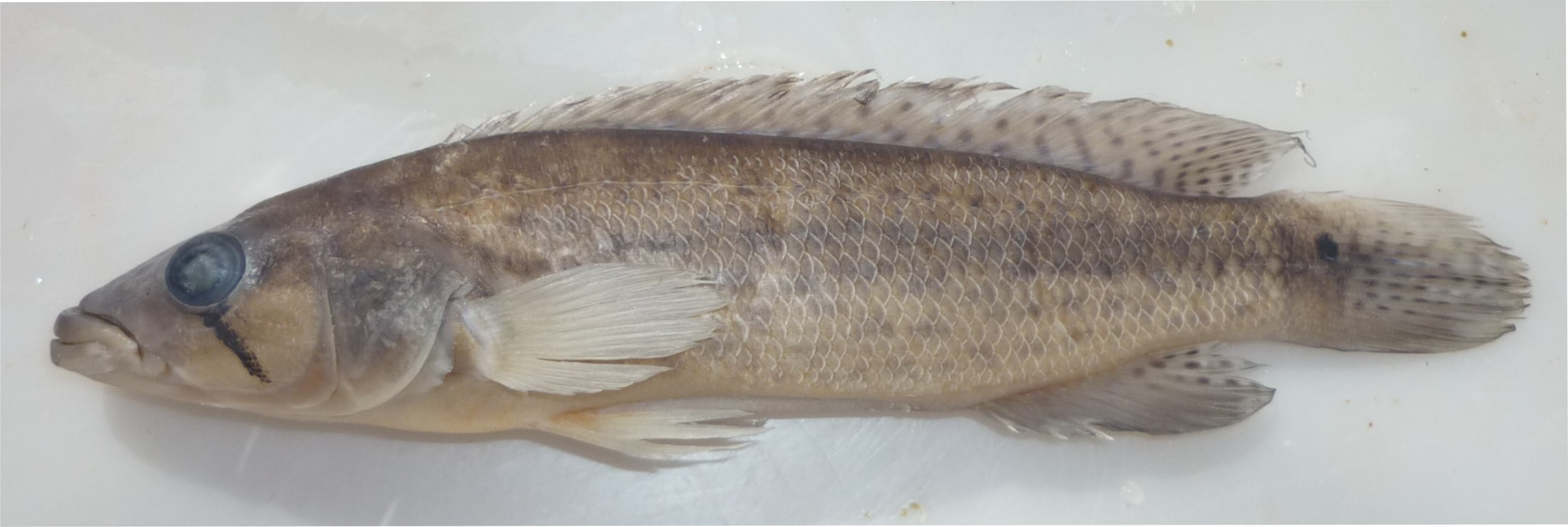

Scientific classification
- Kingdom: Animalia
- Phylum: Chordata
- Class: Actinopterygii
- Order: Cichliformes
- Family: Cichlidae
- Genus: Crenicichla
- Species: C. gillmorlisi

Binomial name
- Crenicichla gillmorlisi S. O. Kullander & C. A. S. de Lucena, 2013

= Crenicichla gillmorlisi =

Species of fish

Crenicichla gillmorlisi is a species of cichlid native to South America. It is found in the Río Acaray drainage in Paraguay. This species reaches a length of 17.4 cm (6.9 in).

It was recently described.

The fish is named in honor of ichthyologist Walter A. Gill Morlis A., a fisheries officer of the Itaipú Binacional, Ciudad del Este, Paraguay, who contributed considerably to surveys of fishes in the tributaries of the río Paraná and for his long term support in the inventory of fishes in from that river system.
