= Crenicichla igara =

Scientific classification
- Kingdom: Animalia
- Phylum: Chordata
- Class: Actinopterygii
- Order: Cichliformes
- Family: Cichlidae
- Genus: Crenicichla
- Species: C. igara

Binomial name
- Crenicichla igara C. A. S. de Lucena & S. O. Kullander, 1992

Species of fish

Crenicichla igara is a species of cichlid native to South America. It is found in the Uruguay River drainage and in tributaries of the upper Uruguay River. This species reaches a length of 31.2 cm (12.3 in).
