= Crenicichla jurubi =

Scientific classification
- Kingdom: Animalia
- Phylum: Chordata
- Class: Actinopterygii
- Order: Cichliformes
- Family: Cichlidae
- Genus: Crenicichla
- Species: C. jurubi

Binomial name
- Crenicichla jurubi C. A. S. de Lucena & S. O. Kullander, 1992

Species of fish

Crenicichla jurubi is a species of cichlid native to South America. It is found in the Uruguay River basin, in tributaries of the upper Uruguay River, Brazil.. This species reaches a length of 30.3 cm (11.9 in).
