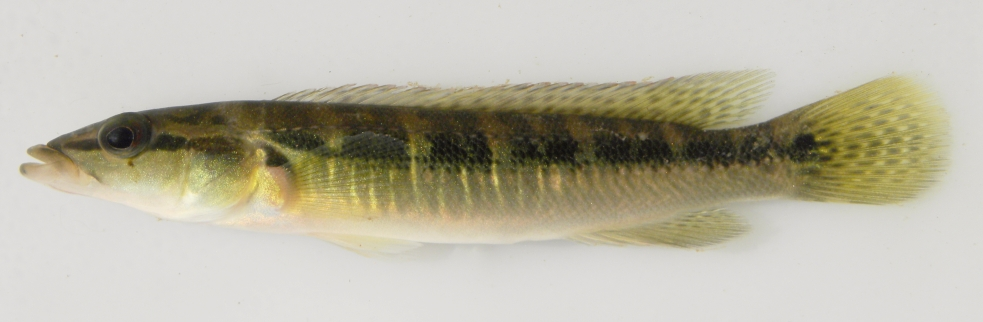

Scientific classification
- Kingdom: Animalia
- Phylum: Chordata
- Class: Actinopterygii
- Order: Cichliformes
- Family: Cichlidae
- Genus: Crenicichla
- Species: C. missioneira

Binomial name
- Crenicichla missioneira C. A. S. de Lucena & S. O. Kullander, 1992

= Crenicichla missioneira =

Species of fish

Crenicichla missioneira is a species of cichlid native to South America. It is found in the Uruguay River drainage, in tributaries of the upper and middle Uruguay River basin. This species reaches a length of 28.3 cm (11.1 in).
