= Crenicichla mandelburgeri =

Conservation status
- Near Threatened (IUCN 3.1)

Scientific classification
- Kingdom: Animalia
- Phylum: Chordata
- Class: Actinopterygii
- Order: Cichliformes
- Family: Cichlidae
- Genus: Crenicichla
- Species: C. mandelburgeri

Binomial name
- Crenicichla mandelburgeri S. O. Kullander, 2009

Species of fish

Crenicichla mandelburgeri is a species of cichlid native to South America. It is found in the río Paraná basin. This species reaches a length of 20.8 cm (8.2 in).

The fish is named in honor of Paraguayan ichthyologist Darío Mandelburger, the co-coordinator of Proyecto Vertebrados del Paraguay (1992-1999).
