= Mazarunia mazarunii =

Scientific classification
- Domain: Eukaryota
- Kingdom: Animalia
- Phylum: Chordata
- Class: Actinopterygii
- Order: Cichliformes
- Family: Cichlidae
- Genus: Mazarunia
- Species: M. mazarunii

Binomial name
- Mazarunia mazarunii S. O. Kullander, 1990

Species of fish

Mazarunia mazarunii is a species of cichlid endemic to Guyana, where it is found in the upper Mazaruni River. This species grows to a length of 5.3 cm (2.1 in).
