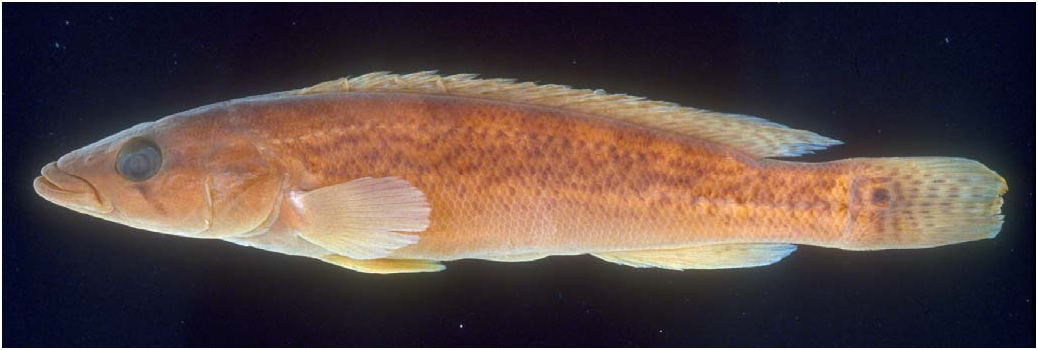

Scientific classification
- Kingdom: Animalia
- Phylum: Chordata
- Class: Actinopterygii
- Order: Cichliformes
- Family: Cichlidae
- Genus: Crenicichla
- Species: C. iguapina

Binomial name
- Crenicichla iguapina S. O. Kullander & C. A. S. de Lucena, 2006

= Crenicichla iguapina =

Species of fish

Crenicichla iguapina is a species of cichlid native to South America. It is found in the Rio Ribeira de Igupae drainage in Brazil. This species reaches a length of 17.6 cm (6.9 in).
