= Saxatilia sveni =

Conservation status
- Least Concern (IUCN 3.1)

Scientific classification
- Kingdom: Animalia
- Phylum: Chordata
- Class: Actinopterygii
- Order: Cichliformes
- Family: Cichlidae
- Genus: Saxatilia
- Species: S. sveni

Binomial name
- Saxatilia sveni (Ploeg, 1991)

Synonyms
- Crenicichla sveni

Species of fish

Saxatilia sveni is a species of cichlid native to South America. It is found in the Orinoco River basin, in the Llanos of Venezuela and Colombia. This species reaches a length of 25 cm (9.8 in).

The fish is named in honor of Swedish cichlidologist Sven O. Kullander (b. 1952) of the Swedish Museum of Natural History, because of his contributions to the further knowledge of the genus Crenicichla.
