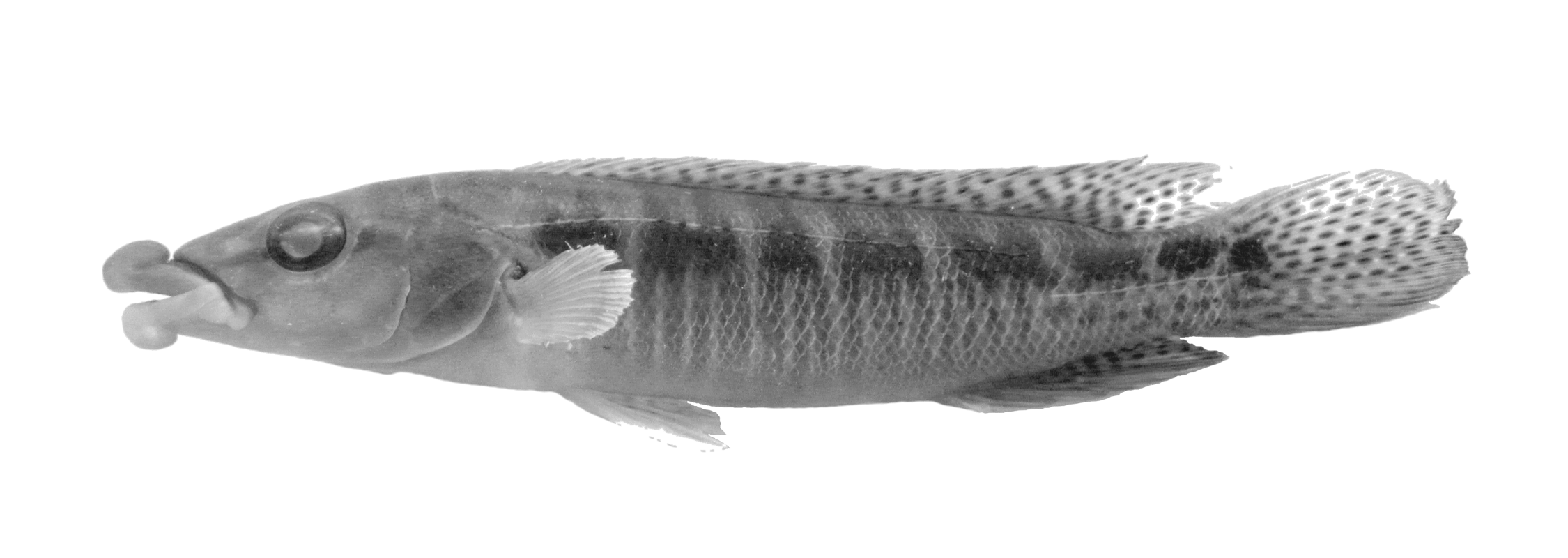
- Preserved Crenicichla tendybaguassu specimine

Scientific classification
- Kingdom: Animalia
- Phylum: Chordata
- Class: Actinopterygii
- Order: Cichliformes
- Family: Cichlidae
- Genus: Crenicichla
- Species: C. tendybaguassu

Binomial name
- Crenicichla tendybaguassu C. A. S. de Lucena & S. O. Kullander, 1992

= Crenicichla tendybaguassu =

Species of fish

Crenicichla tendybaguassu is a species of cichlid native to South America. It is found in the Uruguay River drainage, in tributaries of the middle and upper Uruguay River basin. This species reaches a length of 15.2 cm (6.0 in).
