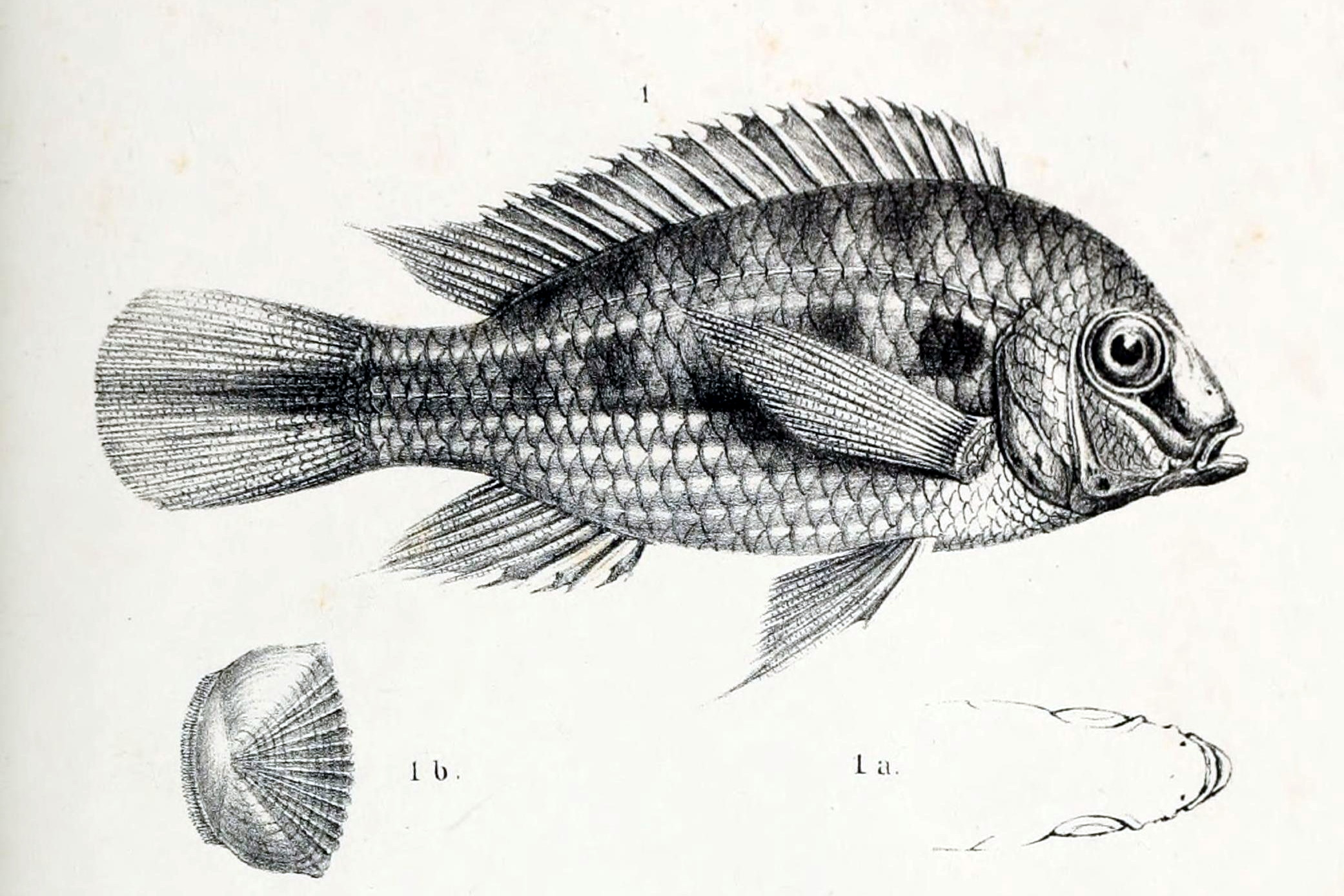
- Crenicara punctulatum

Scientific classification
- Kingdom: Animalia
- Phylum: Chordata
- Class: Actinopterygii
- Order: Cichliformes
- Family: Cichlidae
- Subfamily: Cichlinae
- Tribe: Geophagini
- Subtribe: Crenicaratina
- Genus: Crenicara; Steindachner, 1875

Type species
- Crenicara elegans Steindachner, 1875

= Crenicara =

Genus of fishes

Crenicara is a small genus of cichlid fishes native to creeks and rivers in the Amazon and Essequibo basins in South America. These cichlids have several dark spots on the sides of their bodies, and do not surpass 10 cm (3.9 in) in length.

In the past, the members of the genus Dicrossus were sometimes included in Crenicara. Members of both genera are sometimes known as checkerboard or chessboard cichlids.

== Species ==
The two recognized species in this genus are:

- Crenicara latruncularium S. O. Kullander & Staeck, 1990
- Crenicara punctulata (Günther, 1863) (checkerboard cichlid)

Names brought to synonymy

- Crenicara altispinosa Haseman, 1911, a synonym for Mikrogeophagus altispinosus
- Crenicara elegans Steindachner, 1875, a synonym for Crenicara punctulatum, the Checkerboard cichlid
- Crenicara filamentosa Ladiges, 1958, a synonym for Dicrossus filamentosus, the Chessboard cichlid
- Crenicara maculata (Steindachner, 1875) and Crenicara praetoriusi Weise, 1935, synonyms for Dicrossus maculatus
