= Crenicichla cametana =

Conservation status
- Least Concern (IUCN 3.1)

Scientific classification
- Kingdom: Animalia
- Phylum: Chordata
- Class: Actinopterygii
- Order: Cichliformes
- Family: Cichlidae
- Genus: Crenicichla
- Species: C. cametana

Binomial name
- Crenicichla cametana Steindachner, 1911

Synonyms
- Crenicichla astroblepa Ploeg, 1986

Species of fish

Crenicichla cametana is a species of cichlid native to South America. It is found in the Amazon River basin and in the Tocantins River basin, Brazil. This species reaches a length of 18.3 cm (7.2 in).
