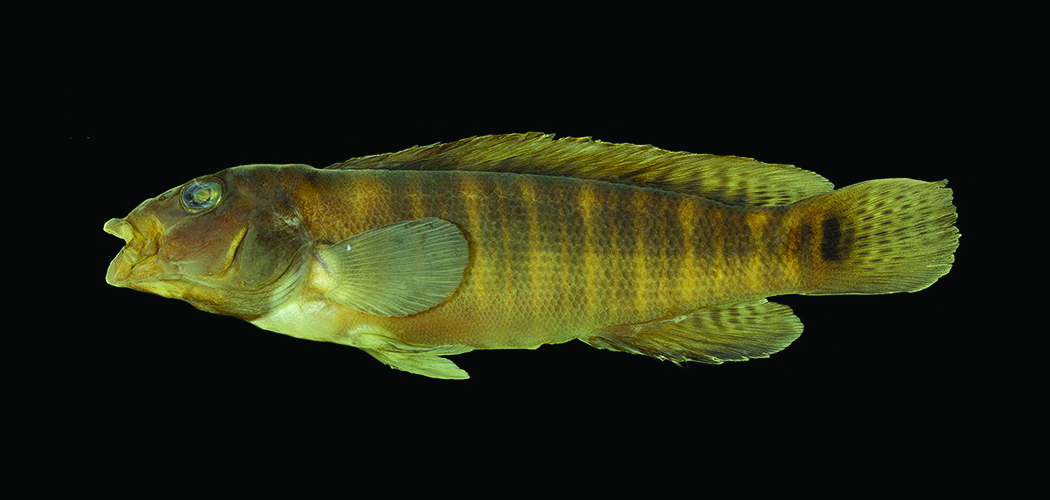

Scientific classification
- Domain: Eukaryota
- Kingdom: Animalia
- Phylum: Chordata
- Class: Actinopterygii
- Order: Cichliformes
- Family: Cichlidae
- Genus: Crenicichla
- Species: C. jupiaensis

Binomial name
- Crenicichla jupiaensis Britski & Luengo, 1968

= Crenicichla jupiaensis =

Species of fish

Crenicichla jupiaensis is a species of cichlid native to South America. It is found swimming in the upper Paraná River basin. This species reaches a length of 9.3 cm (3.7 in).
