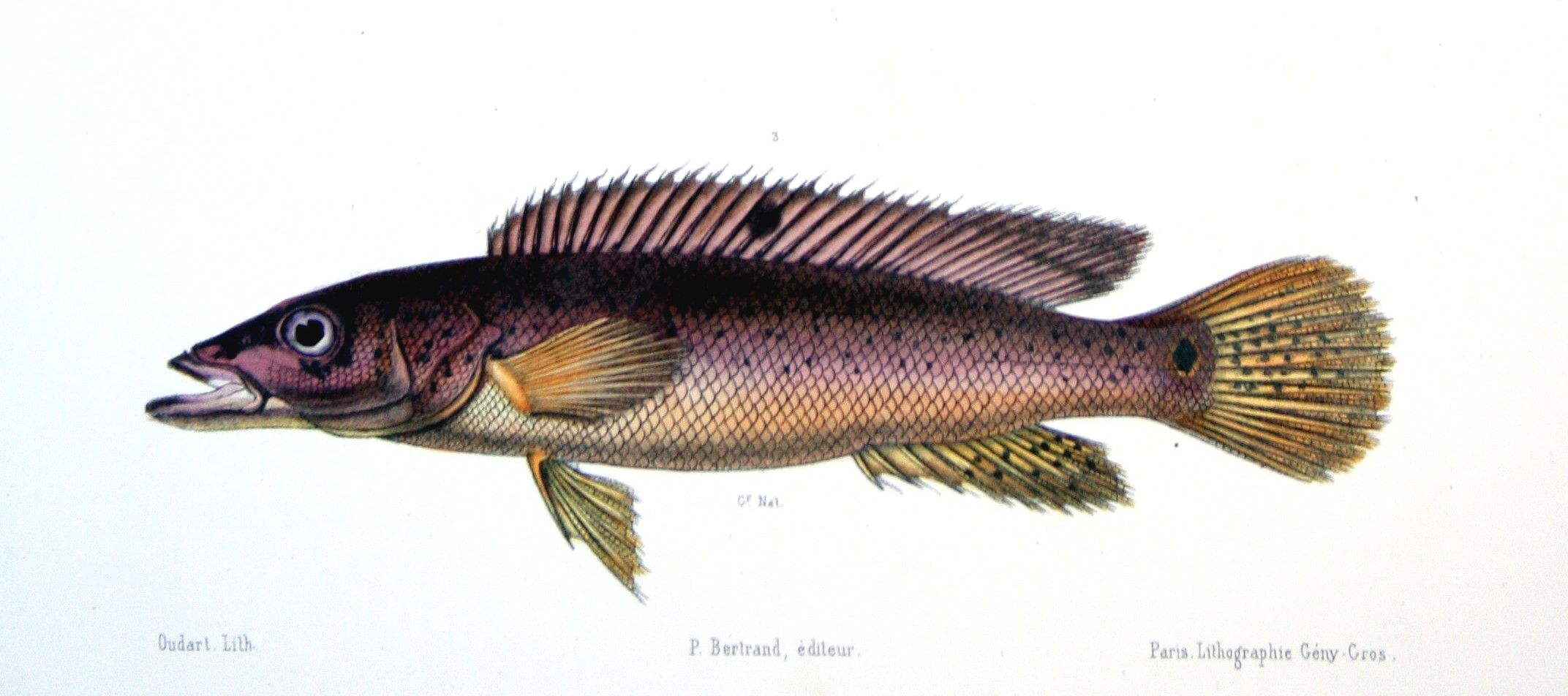

Scientific classification
- Domain: Eukaryota
- Kingdom: Animalia
- Phylum: Chordata
- Class: Actinopterygii
- Order: Cichliformes
- Family: Cichlidae
- Genus: Crenicichla
- Species: C. lacustris

Binomial name
- Crenicichla lacustris (Castelnau, 1855)

= Crenicichla lacustris =

Species of fish

Crenicichla lacustris is a species of cichlid native to South America. It is found in the coastal drainages of southeastern and eastern Brazil. And is reported from Argentina. This species reaches a length of 35.2 cm (13.9 in).
