= Crenicichla geayi =

Conservation status
- Least Concern (IUCN 3.1)

Scientific classification
- Kingdom: Animalia
- Phylum: Chordata
- Class: Actinopterygii
- Order: Cichliformes
- Family: Cichlidae
- Genus: Crenicichla
- Species: C. geayi

Binomial name
- Crenicichla geayi Pellegrin, 1903

Species of fish

Crenicichla geayi, also known as the half-banded pike cichlid, is a species of cichlid native to South America. It is found in the Orinoco River basin and in the Portuguesa River basin. This species reaches a length of 18.4 cm (7.2 in).

The fish is named in honor of pharmacist and natural history collector Martin François Geay (1859-1910), who collected the type specimen.
