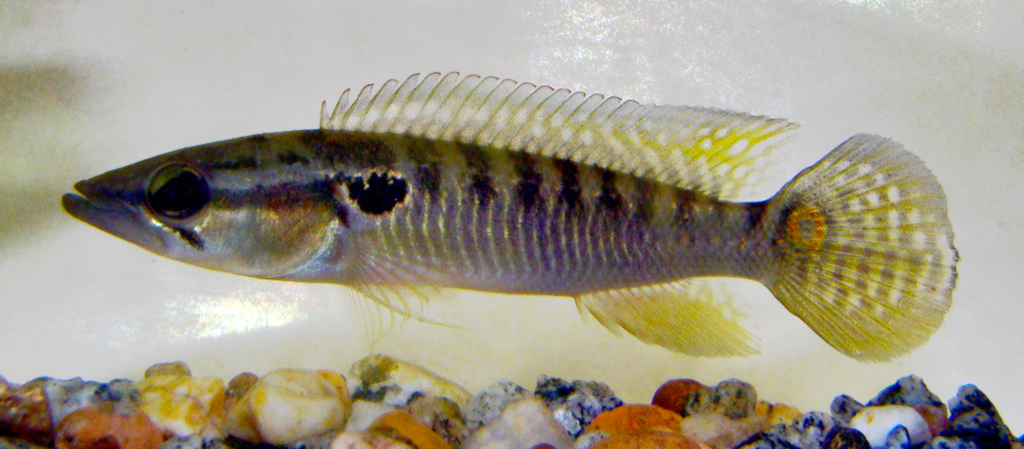
- Crenicichla punctata

Scientific classification
- Kingdom: Animalia
- Phylum: Chordata
- Class: Actinopterygii
- Division: Teleostei
- Order: Cichliformes
- Family: Cichlidae
- Subfamily: Cichlinae
- Tribe: Geophagini
- Subtribe: Crenicaratina
- Genus: Crenicichla; Heckel, 1840

Type species
- Crenicichla macrophthalma Heckel, 1840

Synonyms
- Batrachops Heckel, 1840; Boggiania Perugia, 1897

= Crenicichla =

Genus of fishes

Crenicichla is a genus of cichlids native to South America, which are one of the genera commonly known as pike cichlids. They are found in most tropical and subtropical freshwater habitats between the Andes and the Atlantic.

== Description ==
The smallest species of Crenicichla are no larger than 6–14 cm (2.4–5.5 in) and may be referred to as "dwarf cichlids" for the aquarium hobby – though their aggressive and territorial habits make them unsuitable for novice keepers. The smallest members, 5.2 to 8.5 centimetres (2.0 to 3.3 in) and formerly the C. wallacii species complex was split off to Wallaciia in 2023, along with the former C. saxatilis complex which became Saxatilia and the C. lugubris complex which became Lugubria. In the same paper, one further genus was erected (Hemeraia) and the remaining species were divided into subgenera. The largest pike cichlids can grow to about 50 cm (20 in) long. Most Crenicichla measure in the range of 15–30 cm (6–12 in). Like many other predatory fishes, a pike cichlid has a wide mouth and elongated body.

== Distribution and ecology ==
The genus Crenicichla is native to freshwater in tropical and subtropical South America east of the Andes, ranging from Trinidad and the Guiana Shield (including Orinoco), through the Amazon and Río de la Plata Basins, south as far as Río Negro in Argentina. Although widespread as a group, the individual species are often restricted to a single river or river basin. They are found in a wide range of habitats, including rivers, streams, pools and lakes; some species are rheophilic.

The vast majority of pike cichlids are predatory and feed on fish, insects, and other small animals. They usually place themselves where they can stay undetected by the prey, like close to a sunken tree stem or behind a rock. This behavior, as well as the correspondingly adapted shape, which resembles that the unrelated pikes (Esocidae) of the Holarctic, gives the pike cichlids their common name. An exception is C. tapii, which is similar in general appearance to other pike cichlids, but unusual for being gregarious and feeding on periphyton.

== Species ==
There are currently 45 recognized species in this genus:

- Subgenus Batrachops
  - Crenicichla cametana Steindachner, 1911
  - Crenicichla cyanonotus Cope, 1870
  - Crenicichla cyclostoma Ploeg, 1986
  - Crenicichla geayi Pellegrin, 1903 (half-banded pike cichlid)
  - Crenicichla jegui Ploeg, 1986
  - Crenicichla reticulata (Heckel, 1840)
  - Crenicichla sedentaria S. O. Kullander, 1986
  - Crenicichla semifasciata (Heckel, 1840)
  - Crenicichla stocki Ploeg, 1991
- Subgenus Crenicichla
  - Crenicichla macrophthalma Heckel, 1840
- Subgenus Lacustria
  - Crenicichla celidochilus Casciotta, 1987 (black-lipped pike cichlid)
  - Crenicichla empheres C. A. S. de Lucena, 2007
  - Crenicichla gaucho C. A. S. de Lucena & S. O. Kullander, 1992
  - Crenicichla gillmorlisi S. O. Kullander & C. A. S. de Lucena, 2013
  - Crenicichla hadrostigma C. A. S. de Lucena, 2007
  - Crenicichla haroldoi Luengo & Britski, 1974
  - Crenicichla hu Piálek, Říčan, Casciotta & Almirón, 2010
  - Crenicichla igara C. A. S. de Lucena & S. O. Kullander, 1992
  - Crenicichla iguapina S. O. Kullander & C. A. S. de Lucena, 2006
  - Crenicichla iguassuensis Haseman, 1911
  - Crenicichla jaguarensis Haseman, 1911
  - Crenicichla jupiaensis Britski & Luengo, 1968
  - Crenicichla jurubi C. A. S. de Lucena & S. O. Kullander, 1992
  - Crenicichla lacustris (Castelnau, 1855)
  - Crenicichla lucenai Mattos, I. Schindler, Ottoni & Cheffe, 2014
  - Crenicichla maculata S. O. Kullander & C. A. S. de Lucena, 2006
  - Crenicichla mandelburgeri S. O. Kullander, 2009
  - Crenicichla minuano C. A. S. de Lucena & S. O. Kullander, 1992
  - Crenicichla missioneira C. A. S. de Lucena & S. O. Kullander, 1992
  - Crenicichla mucuryna R. Ihering (pt), 1914
  - Crenicichla niederleinii (Holmberg, 1891) nomen dubium
  - Crenicichla prenda C. A. S. de Lucena & S. O. Kullander, 1992
  - Crenicichla punctata R. F. Hensel, 1870
  - Crenicichla scottii (C. H. Eigenmann, 1907)
  - Crenicichla taikyra Casciotta, Almirón, Aichino, S. E. Gómez, Piálek, & Říčan, 2013
  - Crenicichla tapii Piálek, Dragová, Casciotta, Almirón & Říčan, 2015
  - Crenicichla tendybaguassu C. A. S. de Lucena & S. O. Kullander, 1992
  - Crenicichla tesay Casciotta & Almirón, 2009
  - Crenicichla tingui S. O. Kullander & C. A. S. de Lucena, 2006
  - Crenicichla tuca Piálek, Dragová, Casciotta, Almirón & Říčan, 2015
  - Crenicichla vittata Heckel, 1840
  - Crenicichla yaha Casciotta, Almirón & S. E. Gómez, 2006
  - Crenicichla ypo Casciotta, Almirón, Piálek, S. E. Gómez & Říčan, 2010
  - Crenicichla zebrina C. G. Montaña, López-Fernández & Taphorn, 2008

In addition to these, several undescribed species are known.
