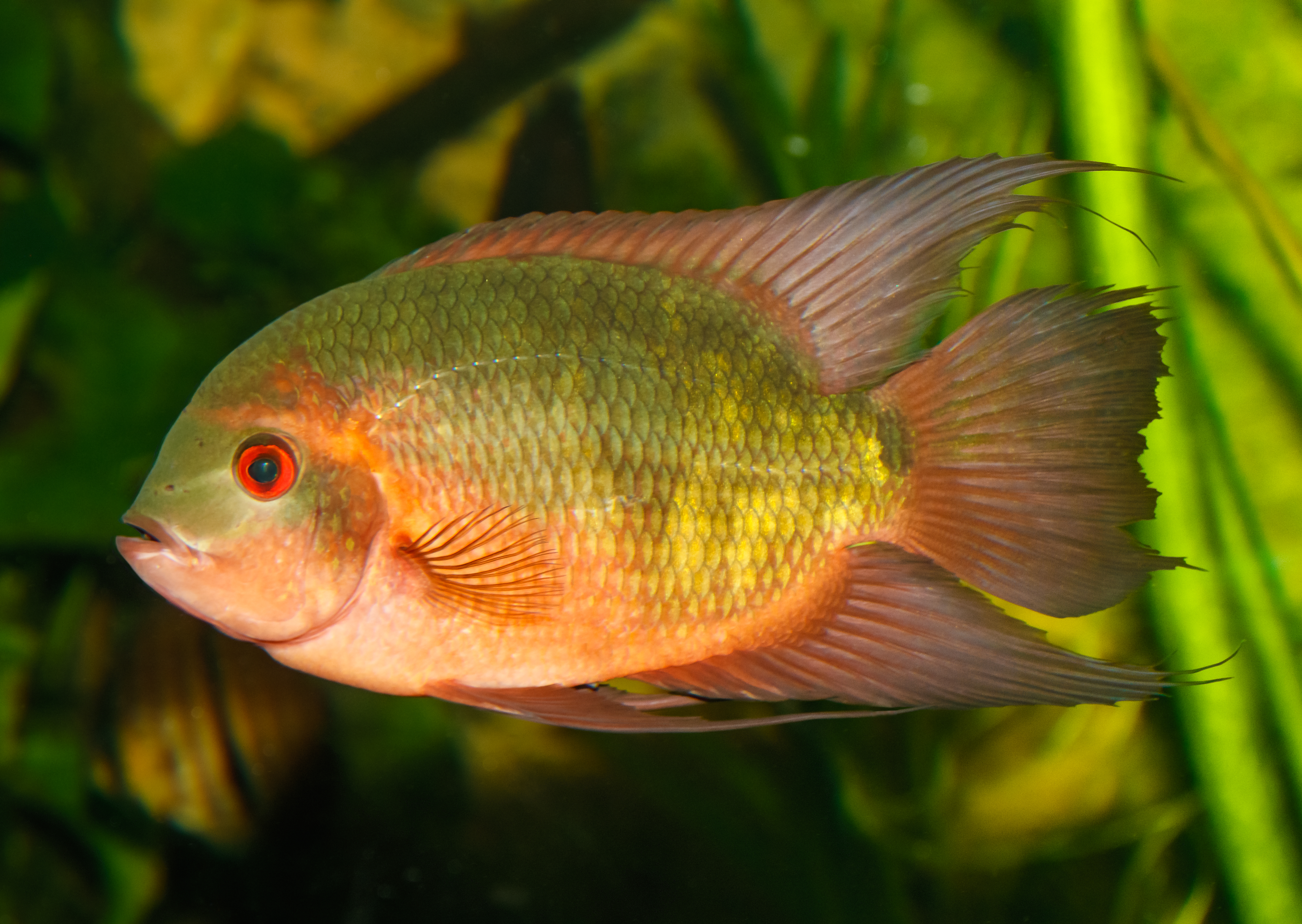

Conservation status
- Least Concern (IUCN 3.1)

Scientific classification
- Kingdom: Animalia
- Phylum: Chordata
- Class: Actinopterygii
- Division: Teleostei
- Order: Cichliformes
- Family: Cichlidae
- Genus: Hypselecara
- Species: H. temporalis

Binomial name
- Hypselecara temporalis (Günther, 1862)

= Emerald cichlid =

Species of fish

The emerald cichlid (Hypselecara temporalis) is a small species of fish in the family Cichlidae. It is native to South America, and can be found in Brazil, Colombia, and Peru. It can reach lengths of up to 30 cm and weight 1-1,5 kg.

== Climate ==
The fish lives in tropical climates, in temperatures between 25 and 30 °C (77 and 86 °F).
