= Crenicichla reticulata =

Scientific classification
- Kingdom: Animalia
- Phylum: Chordata
- Class: Actinopterygii
- Division: Teleostei
- Order: Cichliformes
- Family: Cichlidae
- Genus: Crenicichla
- Species: C. reticulata

Binomial name
- Crenicichla reticulata (Heckel, 1840)

Synonyms
- Crenicichla elegans Steindachner, 1881

Species of fish

Crenicichla reticulata is a species of cichlid native to South America, where it occurs in the Amazon River of Brazil, Colombia and Peru and the Essequibo River of Guyana.
