= Crenicichla taikyra =

Scientific classification
- Domain: Eukaryota
- Kingdom: Animalia
- Phylum: Chordata
- Class: Actinopterygii
- Order: Cichliformes
- Family: Cichlidae
- Genus: Crenicichla
- Species: C. taikyra

Binomial name
- Crenicichla taikyra Casciotta, Almirón, Aichino, S. E. Gómez, Piálek, & Říčan, 2013

Species of fish

Crenicichla taikyra is a species of cichlid native to South America. It is found in the middle río Paraná in Argentina. This species reaches a length of 11.6 cm (4.6 in).
