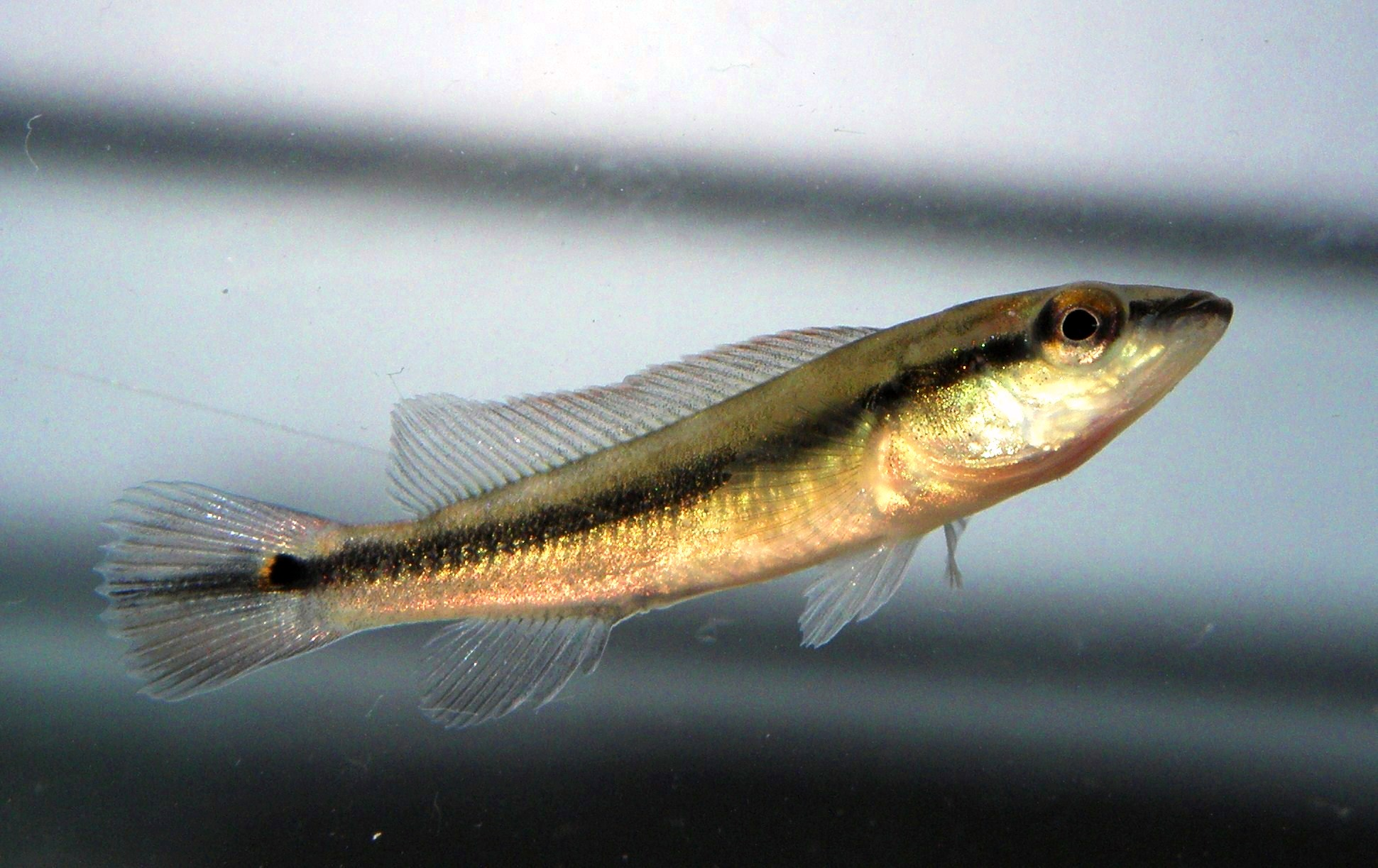

Conservation status
- Least Concern (IUCN 3.1)

Scientific classification
- Kingdom: Animalia
- Phylum: Chordata
- Class: Actinopterygii
- Order: Cichliformes
- Family: Cichlidae
- Genus: Crenicichla
- Species: C. scottii

Binomial name
- Crenicichla scottii C. H. Eigenmann, 1907

= Crenicichla scottii =

Species of fish

Crenicichla scottii is a species of cichlid native to South America. It is found in the middle and lower parts of the Uruguay River drainage in Argentina, Uruguay and Brazil. This species reaches a length of 16.9 cm (6.7 in).

The fish is named in honor of vertebrate paleontologist William Berryman Scott (1858-1947) of Princeton University, who collected the type specimen.
