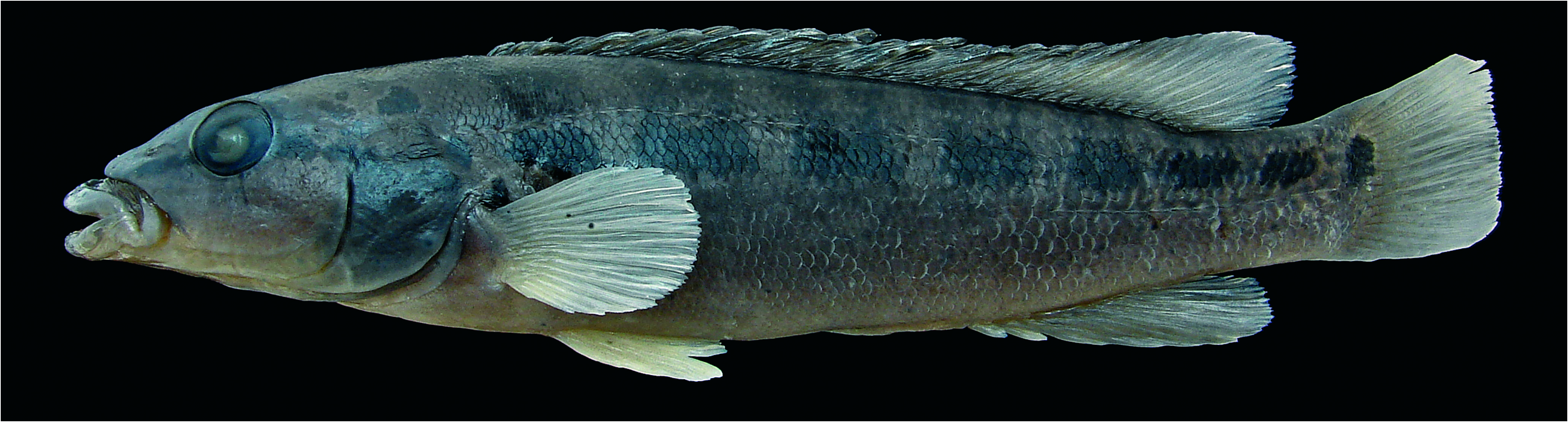

Scientific classification
- Kingdom: Animalia
- Phylum: Chordata
- Class: Actinopterygii
- Order: Cichliformes
- Family: Cichlidae
- Genus: Crenicichla
- Species: C. empheres

Binomial name
- Crenicichla empheres C. A. S. de Lucena, 2007

= Crenicichla empheres =

Species of fish

Crenicichla empheres is a species of cichlid native to South America. It is found in Brazil. This species reaches a length of 14.1 cm (5.6 in).
