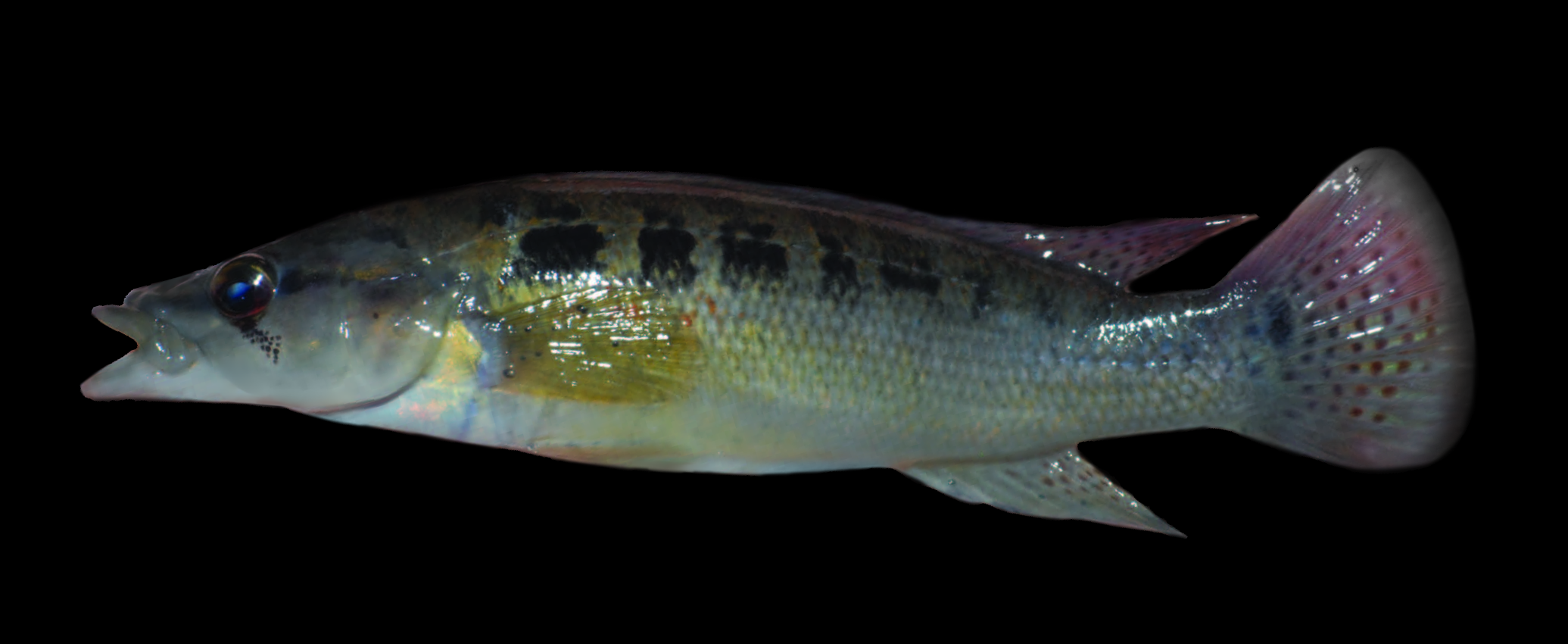
- Male specimen

Scientific classification
- Domain: Eukaryota
- Kingdom: Animalia
- Phylum: Chordata
- Class: Actinopterygii
- Order: Cichliformes
- Family: Cichlidae
- Genus: Crenicichla
- Species: C. ypo

Binomial name
- Crenicichla ypo Casciotta, Almirón, Piálek, S. E. Gómez & Říčan, 2010

= Crenicichla ypo =

Species of fish

Crenicichla ypo is a species of cichlid native to South America. It is found in the Arroyo Uruguaí basin, middle Paraná River basin in Misiones, Argentina. This species reaches a length of 13.7 cm (5.4 in).
