= William Berryman Scott =

American paleontologist

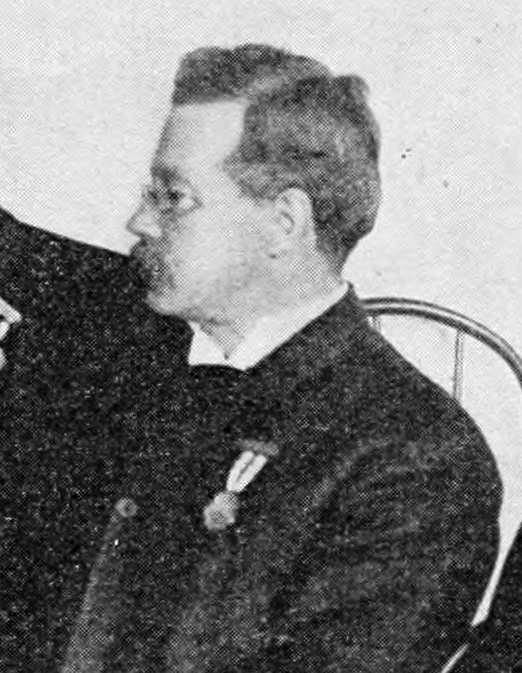
- Scott c. 1905
- Born: 12 February 1859; Cincinnati, Ohio
- Died: 29 March 1947 (aged 88)
- Education: Princeton University (1877); University of Heidelberg (1880)
- Known for: White River Oligocene monographs
- Awards: Wollaston Medal (1910); Hayden Memorial Geological Award (1926); Mary Clark Thompson Medal (1930); Penrose Medal (1939); Daniel Giraud Elliot Medal (1940)
- Scientific career
- Fields: Palaeontology
- Workplaces: Princeton University
- Notable students: Elmer S. Riggs, James W. Gidley

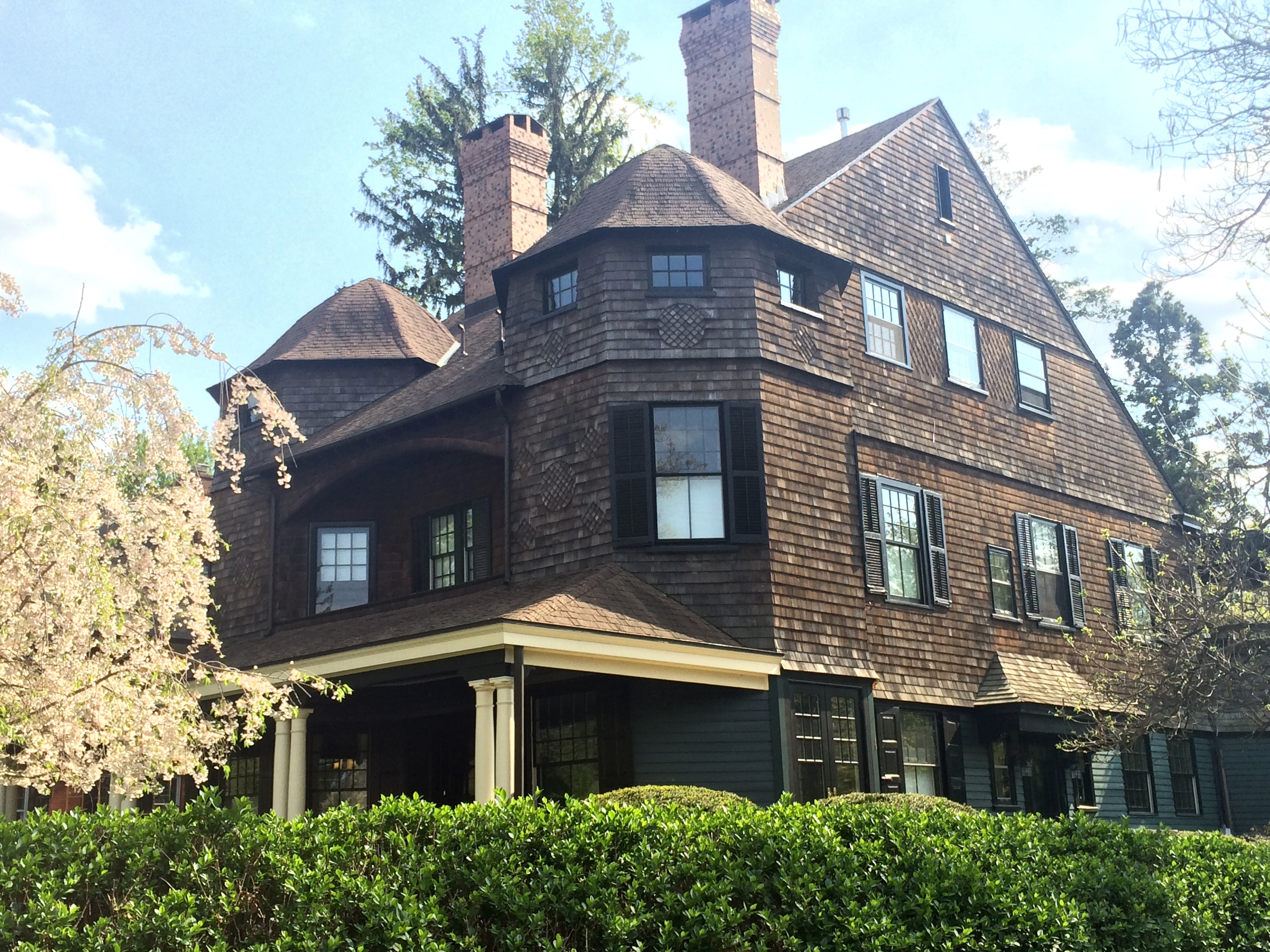
The William Berryman Scott House (1888), designed by A. Page Brown, at 56 Bayard Lane, Princeton, New Jersey in the Princeton Historic District

William Berryman Scott (February 12, 1858 – March 29, 1947) was an American vertebrate paleontologist, authority on mammals, and principal author of the White River Oligocene monographs. He was a professor of geology and paleontology at Princeton University.

== Family and education ==
Scott was born in Cincinnati, Ohio, on February 12, 1858, the son of Mary Elizabeth Hodge Scott and William McKendree Scott, a Presbyterian minister. He was the youngest of three sons; his brother Hugh Lenox Scott went on to become superintendent of West Point and Army Chief of Staff. Shortly after the family moved to Princeton, New Jersey in 1861, his father died and the family lived with his maternal grandfather who was also a Presbyterian minister and an instructor at the Princeton Theological Seminary.

His early education focused on theology, philosophy and the classics in preparation for an expected career as a minister. However, when he entered Princeton University in 1873 at the age of fifteen, he became interested in science, especially geology, psychology, and chemistry. A course he took from the renowned Swiss geologist Arnold Guyot was a turning point in his career aspirations. He graduated from Princeton in 1877 and received a Ph.D. from University of Heidelberg in 1880. He married Alice Adeline Post on December 15, 1883.

He was elected as a member of the American Philosophical Society in 1886.

== Career ==
Scott served as president of The Geological Society of America in 1925. He described Apataelurus kayi in 1937.

== Awards ==
Scott received numerous professional awards during his long career:

- 1910 Wollaston Medal from the Geological Society of London.
- 1930 Mary Clark Thompson Medal from the National Academy of Sciences.
- 1939 Penrose Medal from the Geological Society of America.
- 1940 Daniel Giraud Elliot Medal from the National Academy of Sciences.

== Legacy ==
The pike cichlid fish Crenicichla scottii C. H. Eigenmann, 1907 was named in his honor.

== Publications ==
- Scott, William Berryman, 1858 The Osteology and Relations of Protoceras. Boston, Ginn & company, 1895. 1 p.l., [303]–374. 3 pl. (2 fold.) diagr. 26 cm.
- Scott, William Berryman. American Elephant Myths. Scribner's, April 1887, 469–478.
- Reports of the Princeton University Expeditions to Patagonia, 1896–1899 Princeton, The University, 1901–32 (v. 1, 1903) 8 v. in 13. illus. (part col.) maps (part fold., part col.) tables. 34 cm.
- Scott, William Berryman. Geological Climates, by W.B. Scott.
- Scott, William Berryman. A History of Land Mammals in the Western Hemisphere. Illustrated with 32 plates and more than 100 drawings, by Bruce Horsfall. New York, The MacMillan Company, 1913.
- Scott, William Berryman, The Theory of Evolution, With Special Reference to the Evidence Upon Which it is Founded. The Macmillan Company, 1920.
- Scott, William Berryman. Some memories of a palaeontologist. Princeton, Princeton University Press, 1939. 4 p.l., 336 p. front. (port.) 24 cm.
