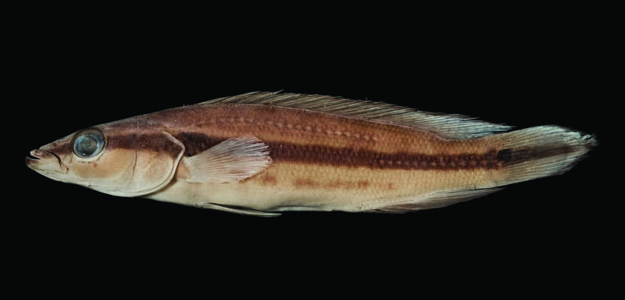

Conservation status
- Least Concern (IUCN 3.1)

Scientific classification
- Kingdom: Animalia
- Phylum: Chordata
- Class: Actinopterygii
- Order: Cichliformes
- Family: Cichlidae
- Genus: Hemeraia
- Species: H. hemera

Binomial name
- Hemeraia hemera (S. O. Kullander, 1990)

Synonyms
- Crenicichla hemera

= Hemeraia hemera =

Species of fish

Crenicichla hemera is a species of cichlid native to South America. It is found in the Amazon River basin, in the upper Aripuanã River and in the Madeira River drainage. This species reaches a length of 9.7 cm (3.8 in).
