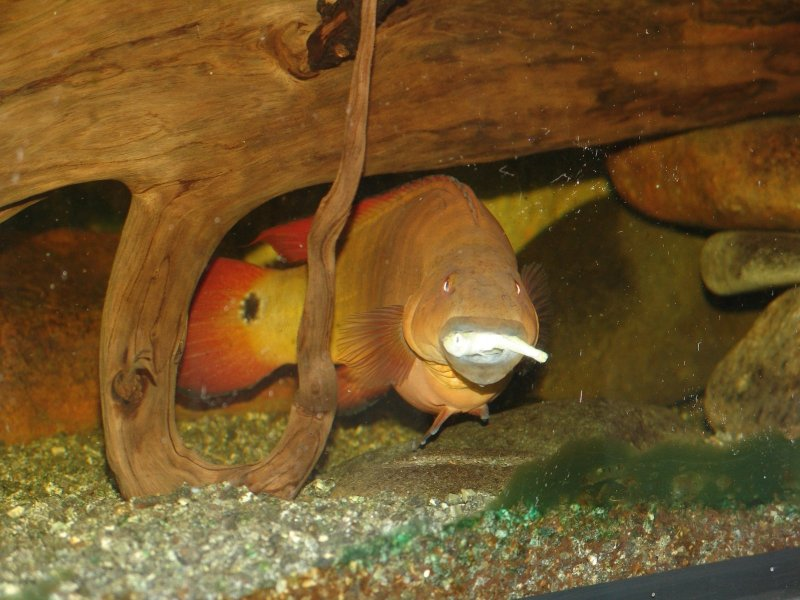

Scientific classification
- Domain: Eukaryota
- Kingdom: Animalia
- Phylum: Chordata
- Class: Actinopterygii
- Order: Cichliformes
- Family: Cichlidae
- Genus: Crenicichla
- Species: C. zebrina

Binomial name
- Crenicichla zebrina C. G. Montaña, López-Fernández & Taphorn, 2008

= Crenicichla zebrina =

Species of fish

Crenicichla zebrina is a species of cichlid native to South America. It is found only from the Ventuari River, the largest Venezuelan tributary of the upper Orinoco River basin. This species reaches a length of 26.4 cm (10.4 in).
