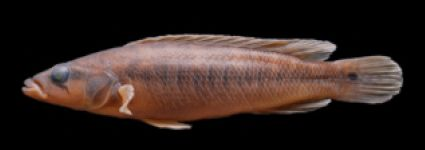
- Specimen from the Uberaba River, Paraná. Scale bar 10 mm.

Scientific classification
- Domain: Eukaryota
- Kingdom: Animalia
- Phylum: Chordata
- Class: Actinopterygii
- Order: Cichliformes
- Family: Cichlidae
- Genus: Crenicichla
- Species: C. jaguarensis

Binomial name
- Crenicichla jaguarensis Haseman, 1911

= Crenicichla jaguarensis =

Species of fish

Crenicichla jaguarensis is a species of cichlid native to South America. It is found in the upper Paraná River basin, Brazil. This species reaches a length of 14.8 cm (5.8 in).
