= Crenicichla hu =

Scientific classification
- Domain: Eukaryota
- Kingdom: Animalia
- Phylum: Chordata
- Class: Actinopterygii
- Order: Cichliformes
- Family: Cichlidae
- Genus: Crenicichla
- Species: C. hu

Binomial name
- Crenicichla hu Piálek, Říčan, Casciotta & Almirón, 2010

Species of fish

Crenicichla hu is a species of cichlid native to South America. It is found in Argentina. This species reaches a length of 15.3 cm (6.0 in).
