= Crenicichla tesay =

Scientific classification
- Domain: Eukaryota
- Kingdom: Animalia
- Phylum: Chordata
- Class: Actinopterygii
- Order: Cichliformes
- Family: Cichlidae
- Genus: Crenicichla
- Species: C. tesay

Binomial name
- Crenicichla tesay Casciotta & Almirón, 2009

Species of fish

Crenicichla tesay is a species of cichlid that is native to South America. It is found in the Río Iguazú basin in Argentina. This species can reach a length of 11.5 cm (4.5 in).
