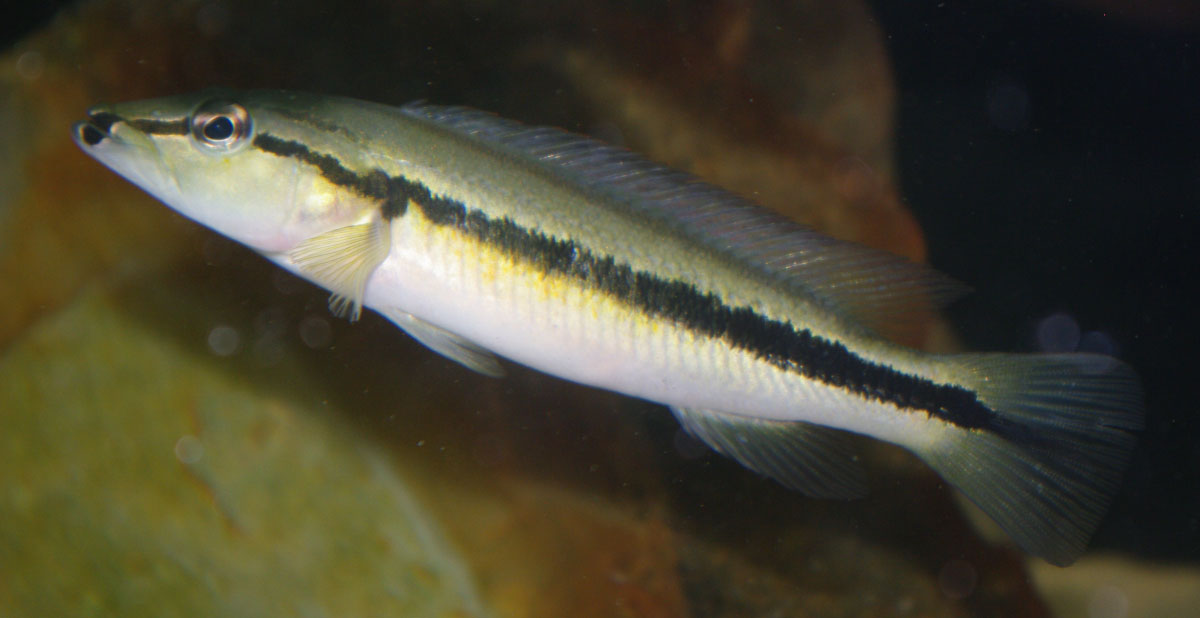

Scientific classification
- Kingdom: Animalia
- Phylum: Chordata
- Class: Actinopterygii
- Order: Cichliformes
- Family: Cichlidae
- Genus: Crenicichla
- Species: C. celidochilus

Binomial name
- Crenicichla celidochilus Casciotta, 1987

= Crenicichla celidochilus =

Species of fish

Crenicichla celidochilus is a species of cichlid native to South America. It is found in the Uruguay River drainage, in tributaries of the middle and upper Uruguay River basin. This species reaches a length of 26.8 cm (10.6 in).
