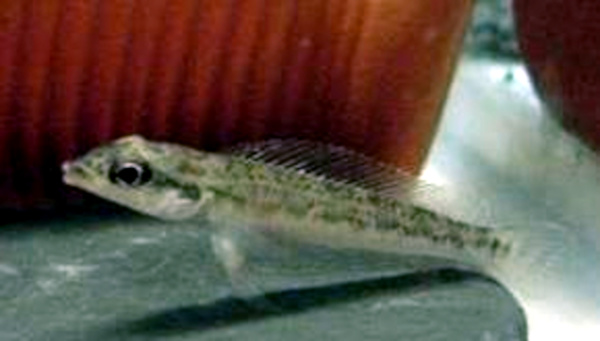

Conservation status
- Endangered (IUCN 3.1)

Scientific classification
- Kingdom: Animalia
- Phylum: Chordata
- Class: Actinopterygii
- Order: Cichliformes
- Family: Cichlidae
- Genus: Teleocichla
- Species: T. cinderella

Binomial name
- Teleocichla cinderella S. O. Kullander, 1988

Synonyms
- Crenicichla cinderella (S. O. Kullander, 1988)

= Teleocichla cinderella =

Species of fish

Teleocichla cinderella is a species of cichlid endemic to Brazil where it is found in the lower Tocantins River basin. This species can reach a length of 14 cm (5.5 in). This species is a rheophile and has an elongated body shape and underdeveloped swimbladder. The species superficially resembles some species of goby or gudgeon.
