= Hypselecara coryphaenoides =

Conservation status
- Least Concern (IUCN 3.1)

Scientific classification
- Kingdom: Animalia
- Phylum: Chordata
- Class: Actinopterygii
- Order: Cichliformes
- Family: Cichlidae
- Genus: Hypselecara
- Species: H. coryphaenoides

Binomial name
- Hypselecara coryphaenoides (Heckel, 1840)

Species of fish

Hypselecara coryphaenoides is a small species of fish in the family Cichlidae. It is native to South America. It can reach a length of 16 centimeters (6.3 in).

== Climate ==
The fish lives in tropical climates, in temperatures between 22 and 30 °C (72 and 86 °F).
