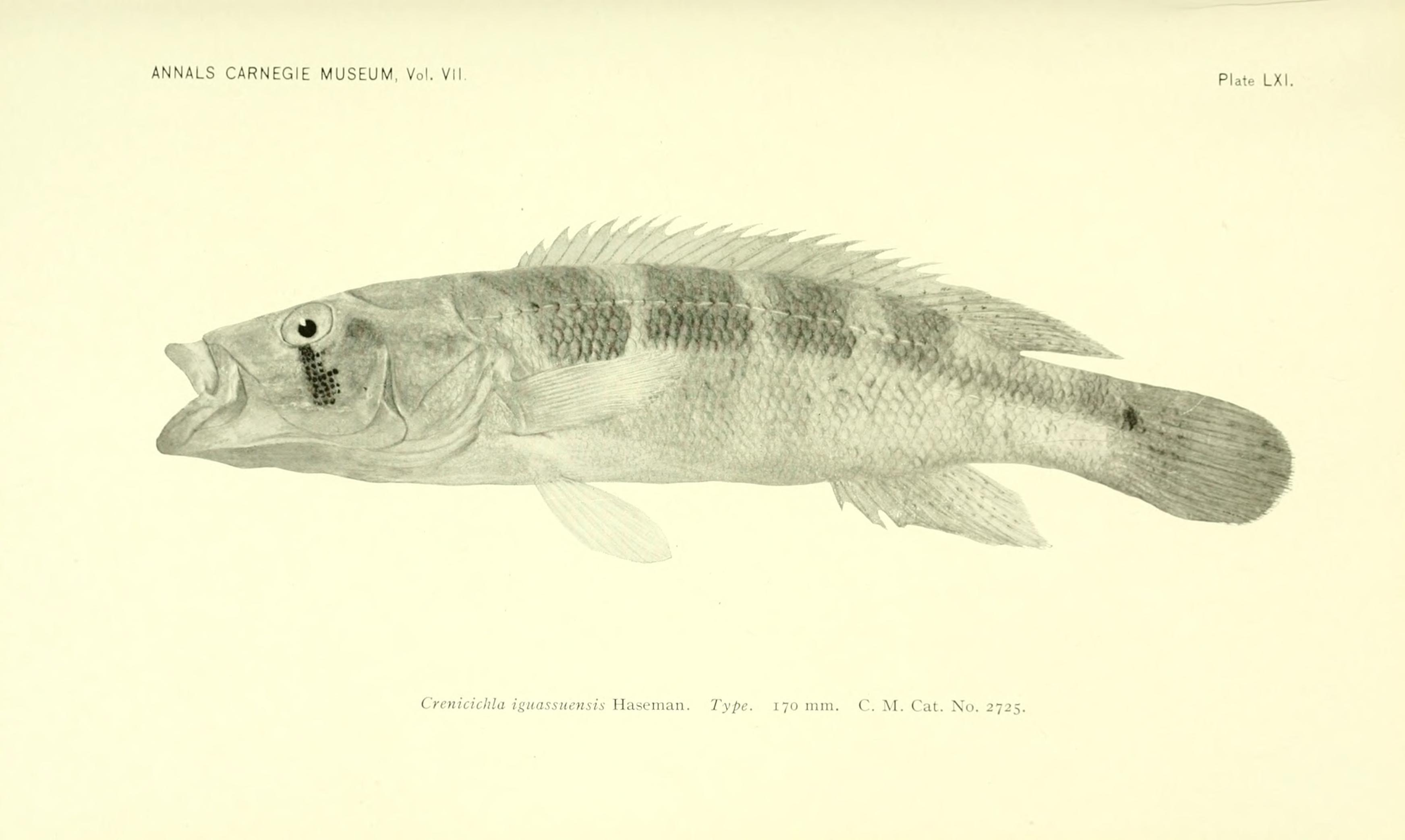
- 1910 print

Scientific classification
- Domain: Eukaryota
- Kingdom: Animalia
- Phylum: Chordata
- Class: Actinopterygii
- Order: Cichliformes
- Family: Cichlidae
- Genus: Crenicichla
- Species: C. iguassuensis

Binomial name
- Crenicichla iguassuensis Haseman, 1911

= Crenicichla iguassuensis =

Species of fish

Crenicichla iguassuensis is a species of cichlid native to South America. It is found in the Paraná River basin, in the Iguaçu River basin and reported to be from the Uruguay streams in Argentina. This species reaches a length of 33 cm (13 in).
