= Crenicichla tuca =

Scientific classification
- Domain: Eukaryota
- Kingdom: Animalia
- Phylum: Chordata
- Class: Actinopterygii
- Order: Cichliformes
- Family: Cichlidae
- Genus: Crenicichla
- Species: C. tuca

Binomial name
- Crenicichla tuca Piálek, Dragová, Casciotta, Almirón & Říčan, 2015

Species of fish

Crenicichla tuca is a species of cichlid native to South America. It is found in the Lower Iguazú River basin above the Iguazú Falls in Argentina. Distributional range extends upstream of the Misiones Province of Argentina into the neighboring state of Paraná, Brazil. This species reaches a length of 15 cm (5.9 in).
