= Crenicichla cyanonotus =

Scientific classification
- Domain: Eukaryota
- Kingdom: Animalia
- Phylum: Chordata
- Class: Actinopterygii
- Order: Cichliformes
- Family: Cichlidae
- Genus: Crenicichla
- Species: C. cyanonotus

Binomial name
- Crenicichla cyanonotus Cope, 1870

Species of fish

Crenicichla cyanonotus is a species of cichlid native to South America. It is found in the Amazon River basin in Peru and western Brazil. This species reaches a length of 14.8 cm (5.8 in).
