= Mazarunia =

Scientific classification
- Domain: Eukaryota
- Kingdom: Animalia
- Phylum: Chordata
- Class: Actinopterygii
- Order: Cichliformes
- Family: Cichlidae
- Subtribe: Geophagina
- Genus: Mazarunia; S. O. Kullander, 1990

Type species
- Mazarunia mazarunii S. O. Kullander, 1990

Genus of fishes

Mazarunia is a genus of cichlids from the Mazaruni River, a tributary of the Essequibo River in Guyana. They are dwarf cichlids that do not surpass 8.5 cm (3.3 in) in length.

== Species ==
There are three species:

- Mazarunia charadrica López-Fernández, Taphorn & Liverpool, 2012
- Mazarunia mazarunii S. O. Kullander, 1990
- Mazarunia pala López-Fernández, Taphorn & Liverpool, 2012
