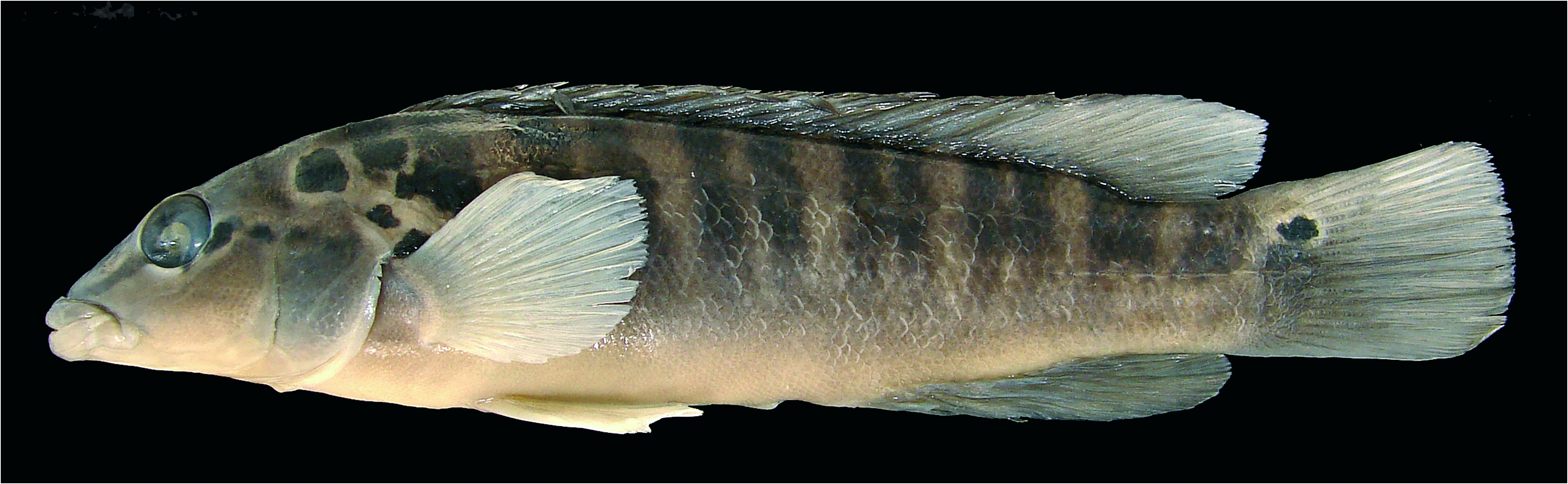

Scientific classification
- Kingdom: Animalia
- Phylum: Chordata
- Class: Actinopterygii
- Order: Cichliformes
- Family: Cichlidae
- Genus: Crenicichla
- Species: C. hadrostigma

Binomial name
- Crenicichla hadrostigma C. A. S. de Lucena, 2007

= Crenicichla hadrostigma =

Species of fish

Crenicichla hadrostigma is a species of cichlid native to South America. It is found in Uruguay. This species reaches a length of 11.4 cm (4.5 in).
