= Crenicichla niederleinii =

Conservation status
- Least Concern (IUCN 3.1)

Scientific classification
- Kingdom: Animalia
- Phylum: Chordata
- Class: Actinopterygii
- Order: Cichliformes
- Family: Cichlidae
- Genus: Crenicichla
- Species: C. niederleinii

Binomial name
- Crenicichla niederleinii (Holmberg, 1891)

Species of fish

Crenicichla niederleinii is a species of cichlid native to South America. It is found in the Paraná River basin, in tributaries of the upper Paraná River in Argentina, Brazil and Paraguay. This species reaches a length of 23.5 cm (9.3 in).

The fish is named in honor of German botanist Gustav Niederlein (1858–1924), who was invited by the Argentinean ministry of agriculture to organize a herbarium, whereby he obtained the type specimen.
