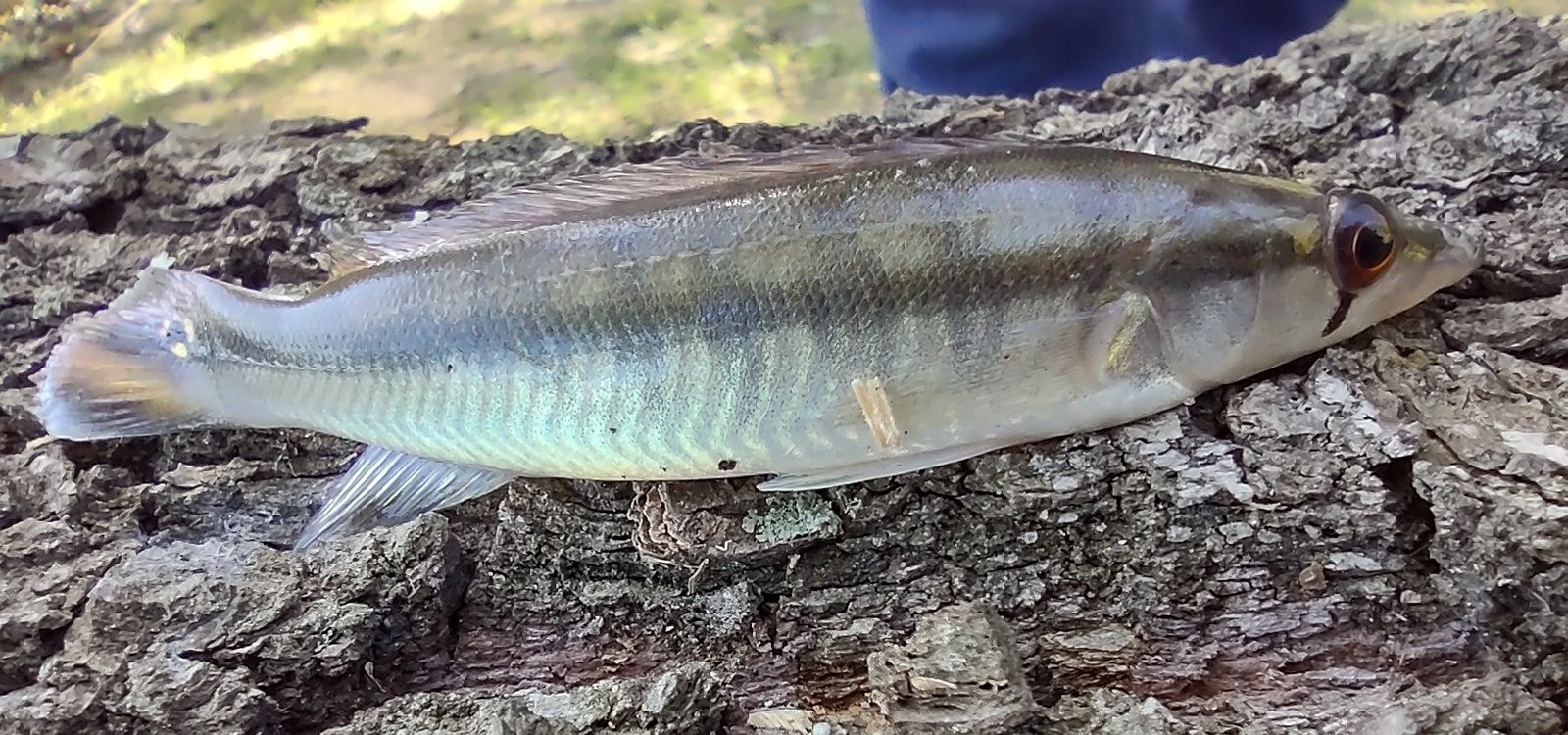

Scientific classification
- Domain: Eukaryota
- Kingdom: Animalia
- Phylum: Chordata
- Class: Actinopterygii
- Order: Cichliformes
- Family: Cichlidae
- Genus: Crenicichla
- Species: C. vittata

Binomial name
- Crenicichla vittata (Heckel, 1840)

= Crenicichla vittata =

Species of fish

Crenicichla vittata is a species of cichlid native to South America. It is found in the Paraná River basin, in the Paraguay River in Brazil and Paraguay, and in the Paraná River drainage in Argentina; also found in the middle Uruguay River drainage in Brazil. This species reaches a length of 26 cm (10 in).
