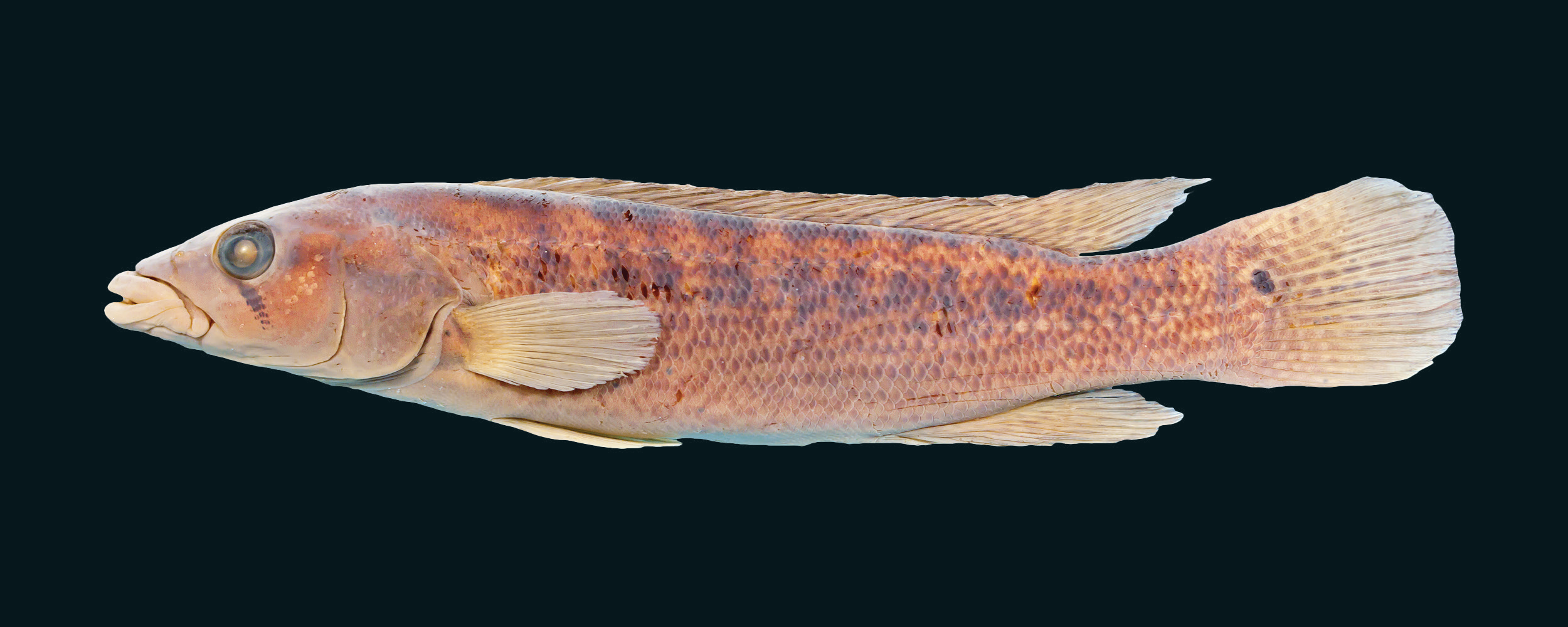

Scientific classification
- Domain: Eukaryota
- Kingdom: Animalia
- Phylum: Chordata
- Class: Actinopterygii
- Order: Cichliformes
- Family: Cichlidae
- Genus: Crenicichla
- Species: C. lucenai

Binomial name
- Crenicichla lucenai Mattos, I. Schindler, Ottoni & Cheffe, 2014

= Crenicichla lucenai =

Species of fish

Crenicichla lucenai is a species of cichlid native to South America. It is found swimming in the Upper Rio das Antas basin, Jacuí river drainage, dos Patos lagoon system in Brazil. This species reaches a length of 14.6 cm (5.7 in).

The fish is named in honor of Carlos Alberto Santos de Lucena, the curator of fishes at the Museu de Ciências e Tecnologia de Pontificia Universidade Católica do Rio Grande do Sul, for his contributions to the taxonomy and systematics of the Crenicichla genus.
