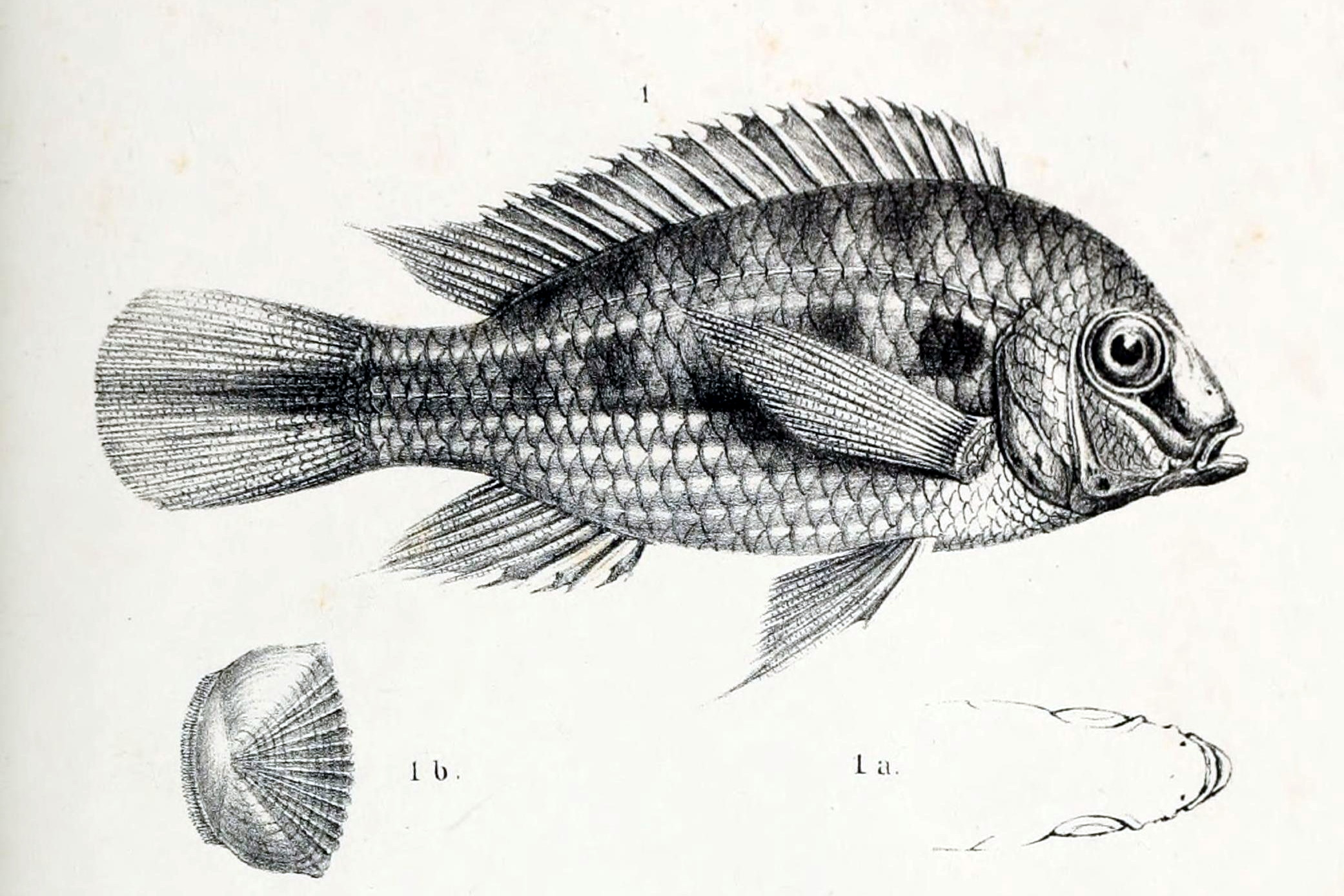

Conservation status
- Least Concern (IUCN 3.1)

Scientific classification
- Kingdom: Animalia
- Phylum: Chordata
- Class: Actinopterygii
- Order: Cichliformes
- Family: Cichlidae
- Genus: Crenicara
- Species: C. punctulata

Binomial name
- Crenicara punctulata (Günther, 1863)

Synonyms
- Acara punctulata Günther, 1863; Aequidens hercules Allen, 1942; Aequidens madeirae Fowler, 1913; Crenicara elegans Steindachner, 1875; Crenicara punctulatum (Günther, 1863)

= Crenicara punctulata =

Species of fish

Crenicara punctulata, is a species of cichlid fish native to creeks and rivers in the Amazon and Essequibo basins in South America.
