= Crenicichla tapii =

Scientific classification
- Kingdom: Animalia
- Phylum: Chordata
- Class: Actinopterygii
- Order: Cichliformes
- Family: Cichlidae
- Genus: Crenicichla
- Species: C. tapii

Binomial name
- Crenicichla tapii Piálek, Dragová, Casciotta, Almirón & Říčan, 2015

Species of fish

Crenicichla tapii is a species of cichlid native to South America. It is found in the lower Iguazú River basin above the Iguazú Falls in Argentina. Distributional range extends upstream of the Misiones Province, Argentina into the neighboring state of Paraná, Brazil. This species reaches a length of 12 cm (4.7 in).

The species name tapii refers to the tapir, genus Tapirus, as an allusion to its semi-herbivorous grazing diet, which is unusual for the typically piscivorous Crenicichla.
