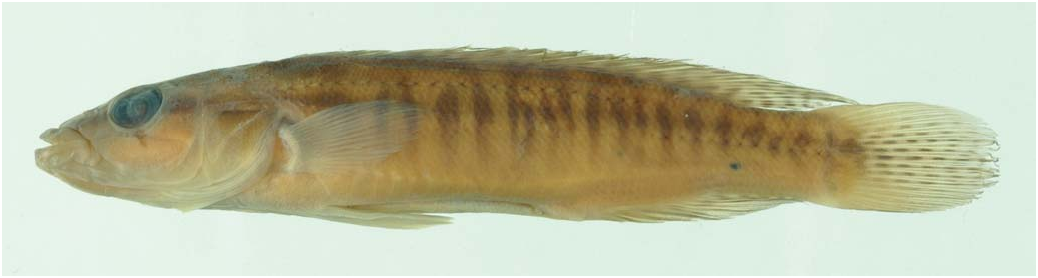

Conservation status
- Near Threatened (IUCN 3.1)

Scientific classification
- Kingdom: Animalia
- Phylum: Chordata
- Class: Actinopterygii
- Order: Cichliformes
- Family: Cichlidae
- Genus: Crenicichla
- Species: C. mucuryna

Binomial name
- Crenicichla mucuryna R. Ihering, 1914

= Crenicichla mucuryna =

Species of fish

Crenicichla mucuryna is a species of cichlid native to South America. It is found in the Mucuri River basin in eastern Brazil. This species reaches a length of 11.3 cm (4.4 in).
