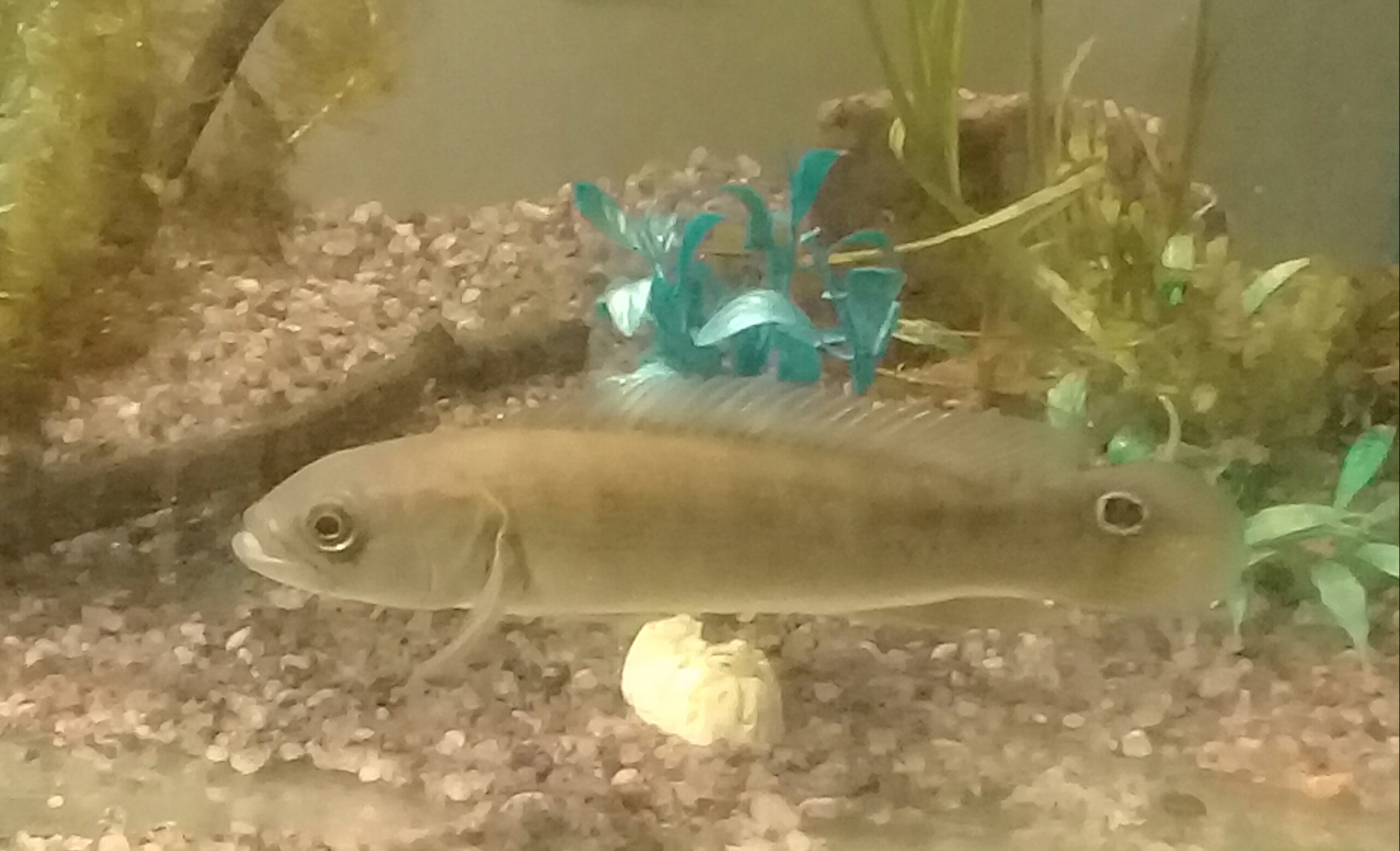

Conservation status
- Least Concern (IUCN 3.1)

Scientific classification
- Kingdom: Animalia
- Phylum: Chordata
- Class: Actinopterygii
- Order: Cichliformes
- Family: Cichlidae
- Genus: Crenicichla
- Species: C. semifasciata

Binomial name
- Crenicichla semifasciata (Heckel, 1840)

Synonyms
- Batrachops semifasciatus

= Crenicichla semifasciata =

Species of fish

Crenicichla semifasciata is a species of cichlid native to South America. It is found in the Paraná River basin, in the Paraguay River in Paraguay and Brazil, and the Paraná drainage in Argentina. This species reaches a length of 17.7 cm (7.0 in).
