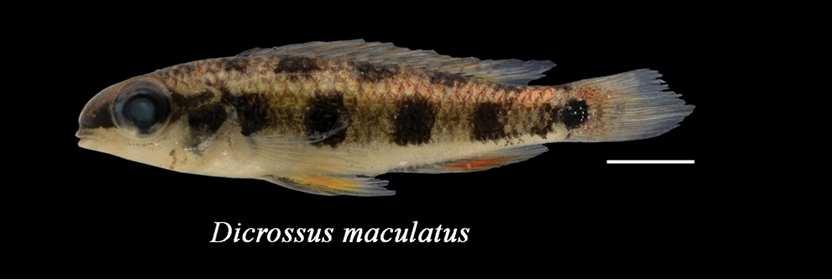
- Dicrossus maculatus

Scientific classification
- Domain: Eukaryota
- Kingdom: Animalia
- Phylum: Chordata
- Class: Actinopterygii
- Order: Cichliformes
- Family: Cichlidae
- Subfamily: Cichlinae
- Tribe: Geophagini
- Subtribe: Crenicaratina
- Genus: Dicrossus; Steindachner, 1875

Type species
- Dicrossus maculatus Steindachner, 1875

= Dicrossus =

Genus of fishes

Dicrossus is a genus of small cichlid fishes native to rivers in the Amazon and Orinoco basins in South America. These cichlids have several dark spots on the sides of their bodies (although very faint in some). Depending on the species, they typically only reach 4–7 cm (1.6–2.8 in) in length.

In the past, Dicrossus species were sometimes included in the genus Crenicara, instead. Members of both genera are sometimes known as checkerboard or chessboard cichlids.

== Species ==
The five recognized species in this genus are:

- Dicrossus filamentosus (Ladiges, 1958) (chessboard cichlid)
- Dicrossus foirni U. Römer, I. J. Hahn & Vergara, 2010
- Dicrossus gladicauda I. Schindler & Staeck, 2008
- Dicrossus maculatus Steindachner, 1875
- Dicrossus warzeli U. Römer, I. J. Hahn & Vergara, 2010
