= Abdelhafidh Yaha =

- Arabic: ياحة عبد الحفيظ
- Born: 26 January 1933; Takhlijt Ath Atsou, Algeria
- Died: 24 January 2016 (aged 82); Paris
- Other name: Si Hafidh
- Occupation: Freedom Fighter
- Organization: Armée de libération nationale (ALN)
- Known for: ambush of Michelet Thappurth Thamoqrate (Great Gate) in 1956
- Movement: Front de libération nationale (FLN)

Abdelhafidh Yaha was a revolutionary fighter and guerrilla leader of the National Liberation Front who fought for Algerian independence against the French occupation.

In 1954 he joined the Front de libération nationale with the liberation of his brother.

In April 1956 one of the most spectacular operations of the FLN was the ambush of Thappurth Thamoqrate (Great Gate), injuring of the administrator of Michelet, Émile Baume and his attaché Marc Bighetti de Flogny, while the town was crowded with soldiers of the 22nd Alpine Chasseurs Battalion, Si Lhafidh managed to escape. In the days that followed, the exactions redoubled ferocity: arrests, tortures and destruction.
