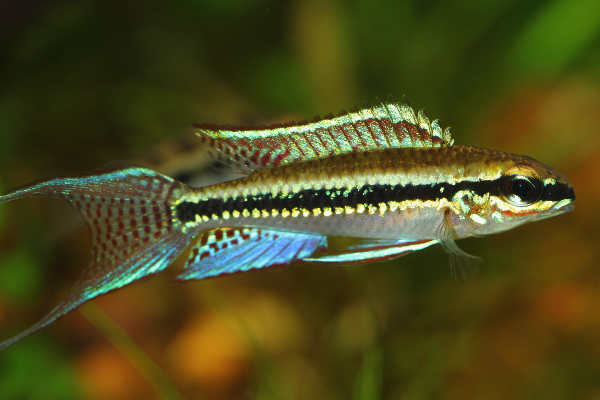

Scientific classification
- Kingdom: Animalia
- Phylum: Chordata
- Class: Actinopterygii
- Order: Cichliformes
- Family: Cichlidae
- Genus: Dicrossus
- Species: D. filamentosus

Binomial name
- Dicrossus filamentosus (Ladiges, 1958)

Synonyms
- Crenicara filamentosa Dicrossus filamentosa

= Dicrossus filamentosus =

Species of fish

Dicrossus filamentosus is a species of dwarf cichlid fish. It occurs in the Rio Negro and Orinoco basins of Colombia, Venezuela, and Brazil.

These fish lays eggs on leaves or directly on the substrate. The female takes care of the fry alone, since it chases the male away after laying. The eggs hatch 3 days later.

== In captivity ==
This omnivorous fish is better kept in temperatures between 24 – 29, pH 4 – 6,8 and dH between 5 – 8. The tank should have a capacity of at least 60 litres, with plenty hiding spaces.
