= Crenicichla macrophthalma =

Scientific classification
- Domain: Eukaryota
- Kingdom: Animalia
- Phylum: Chordata
- Class: Actinopterygii
- Order: Cichliformes
- Family: Cichlidae
- Genus: Crenicichla
- Species: C. macrophthalma

Binomial name
- Crenicichla macrophthalma (Heckel, 1840)

Species of fish

Crenicichla macrophthalma is a species of cichlid native to South America. It is found in Amazon River basin, in the Negro, Uatumã, Tapajós, Xingu and Trombetas River basins. This species reaches a length of 20 cm (7.9 in).
