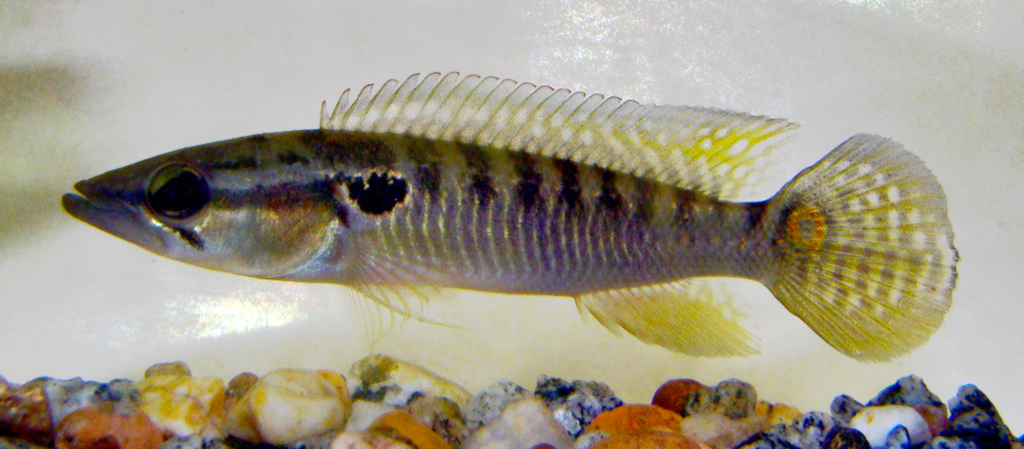
- C. punctata from the Pelotas River, Rio Grande do Sul (Brazil)

Conservation status
- Least Concern (IUCN 3.1)

Scientific classification
- Kingdom: Animalia
- Phylum: Chordata
- Class: Actinopterygii
- Order: Cichliformes
- Family: Cichlidae
- Genus: Crenicichla
- Species: C. punctata

Binomial name
- Crenicichla punctata R. F. Hensel, 1870

= Crenicichla punctata =

Species of fish

Crenicichla punctata is a species of cichlid native to Uruguay and Brazil. This species reaches a standard length of 22.3 cm (8.8 in).
