= Crenicichla yaha =

Scientific classification
- Domain: Eukaryota
- Kingdom: Animalia
- Phylum: Chordata
- Class: Actinopterygii
- Order: Cichliformes
- Family: Cichlidae
- Genus: Crenicichla
- Species: C. yaha

Binomial name
- Crenicichla yaha Casciotta, Almirón & S. E. Gómez, 2006

Species of fish

Crenicichla yaha is a species of cichlid native to South America. It is found in the Arroyo Urugua-í and Río Iguazú basins in Argentina. This species reaches a length of 14.6 cm (5.7 in).
