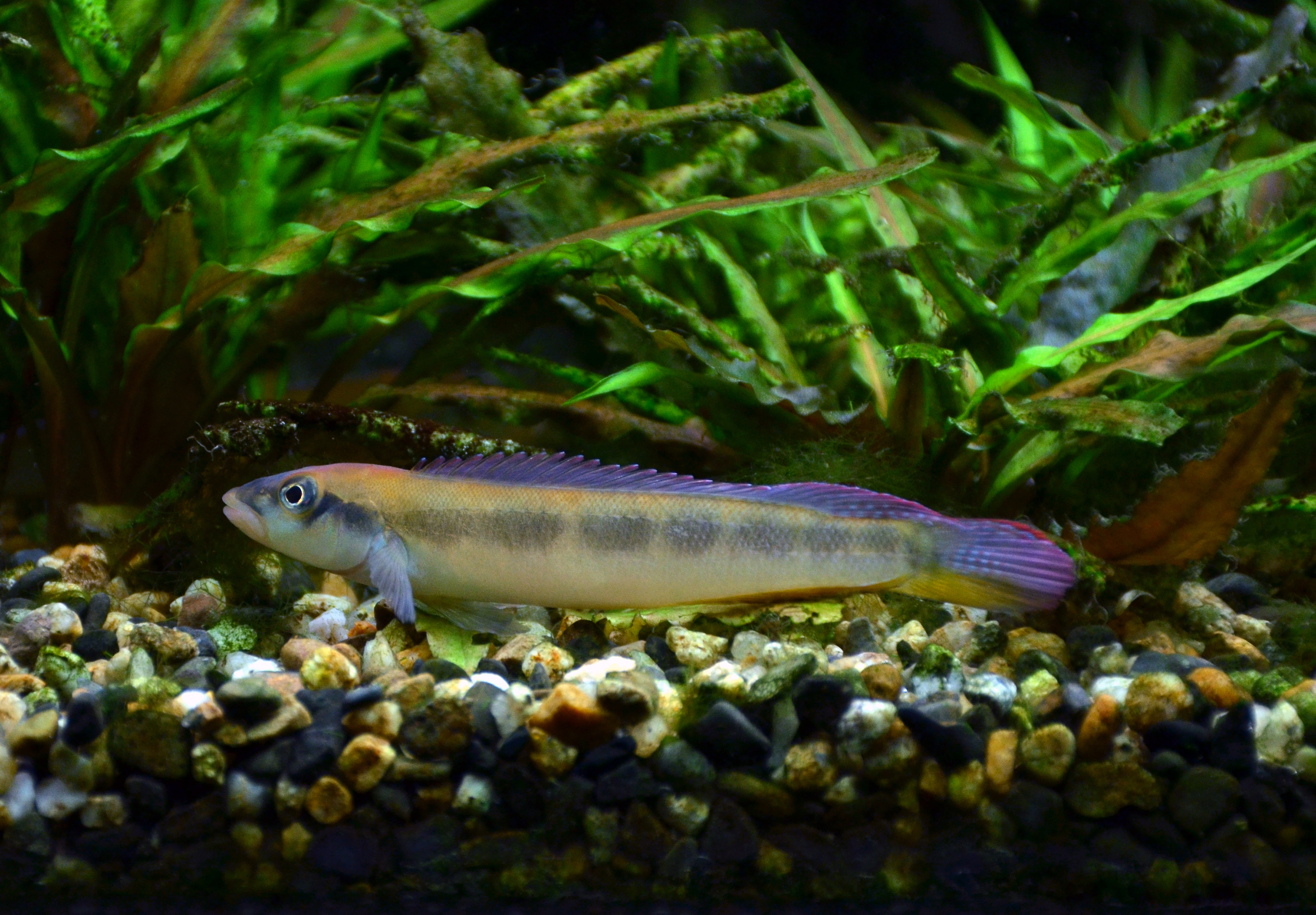
- Teleocichla prionogenys

Scientific classification
- Kingdom: Animalia
- Phylum: Chordata
- Class: Actinopterygii
- Order: Cichliformes
- Family: Cichlidae
- Subfamily: Cichlinae
- Genus: Teleocichla; Kullander, 1988

Type species
- Teleocichla centrarchus Kullander, 1988

= Teleocichla =

Genus of fishes

Teleocichla is a genus of fish in the family Cichlidae found in the Tapajós, Xingu, Tocantins and Jari River basins, which are part of the Amazon River Basin in Brazil. All species are rheophilic, and highly elongated in shape. They generally are smaller than 9 cm (3.5 in) in length, making them some of the smallest cichlids of the Americas. Only T. preta can grow larger, reaching about 12 cm (4.7 in). Since restricted to areas with fast currents (such as cataracts and rapids), they are particularly vulnerable to the building of dams, and the Belo Monte Dam may cause the extinction of T. centisquama. Other species recognized as threatened by Brazil's Ministry of the Environment are T. cinderella, T. prionogenys and T. wajapi.

== Species ==
There are currently 9 recognized species in this genus, but several undescribed species are known.

- Teleocichla centisquama Zuanon & I. Sázima (fr), 2002 (slender pike cichlid)
- Teleocichla centrarchus Kullander, 1988
- Teleocichla cinderella Kullander, 1988
- Teleocichla gephyrogramma Kullander, 1988
- Teleocichla monogramma Kullander, 1988
- Teleocichla preta H. R. Varella, Zuanon, Kullander & López-Fernández, 2016
- Teleocichla prionogenys Kullander, 1988
- Teleocichla proselytus Kullander, 1988
- Teleocichla wajapi H. R. Varella & C. L. R. Moreira, 2013
