= Sven O. Kullander =

Swedish ichthyologist

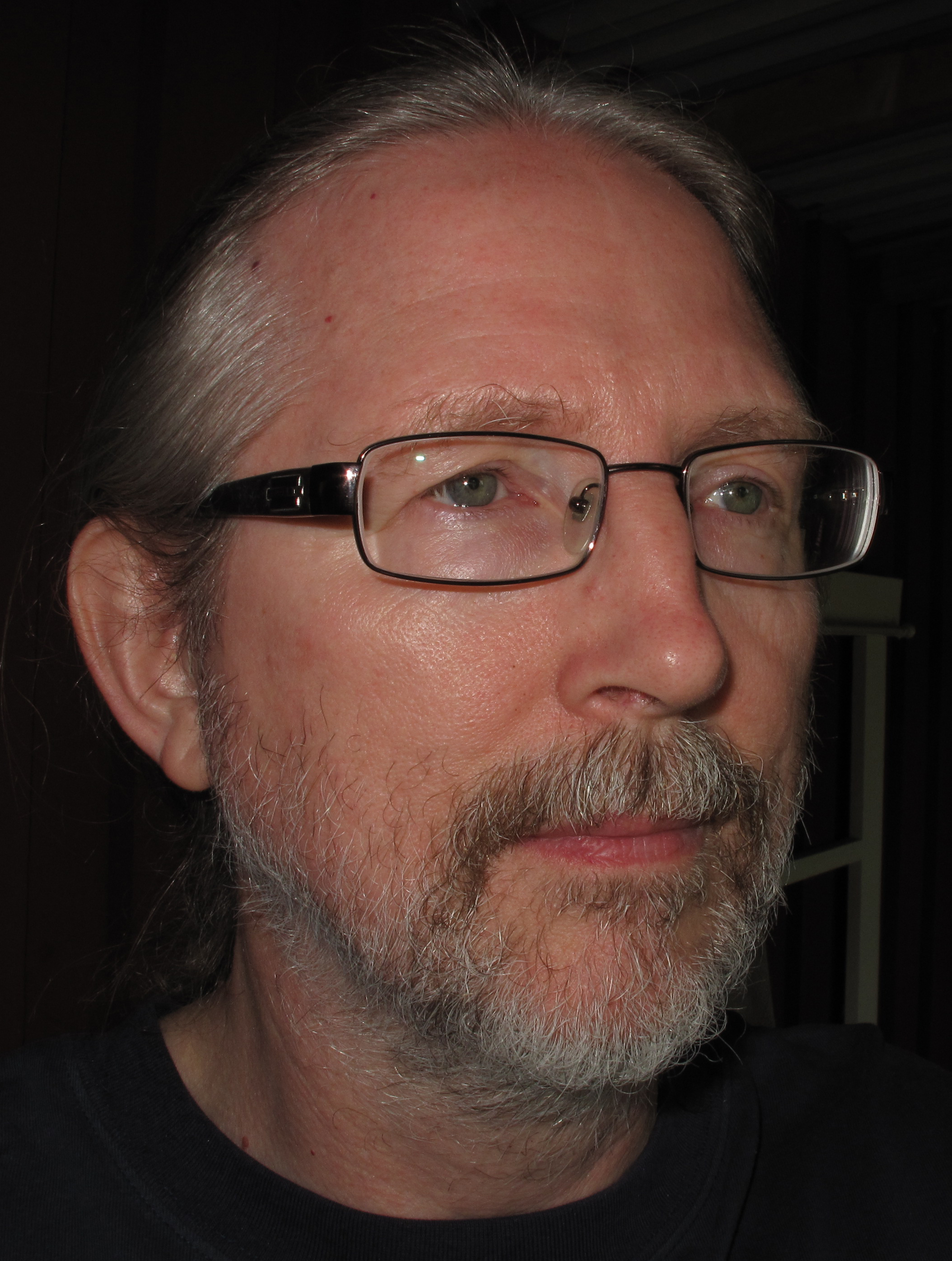
Sven O. Kullander

Sven Oscar Kullander (born 30 November 1952 in Sollefteå) is a Swedish biologist specialised in ichthyology. He primarily researches cichlids – notably the genus Apistogramma and the Cichlasoma-complex – and other tropical fresh water fishes. He also has been working with endangered fish species in Sweden.

He studied at the universities of Umeå and Stockholm, and took his Ph.D. in Stockholm in 1984. He is currently senior curator at the Swedish Museum of Natural History in Stockholm, with the responsibility for the ichthyologic and herpetologic collections. Kullander also coordinates the museum's contributions to FishBase.

Kullander has produced more than 100 scientific and popular publications on fishes, and described many groups and new species of cichlids.

The Swedish aquarists' magazine Tidskriften Akvariet gave him "Akvariets Oscar" ("the Aquarium Academy Award") in 1996, for his great contribution to the aquarium hobby. His wife Fang Fang Kullander (1962–2010) was also an ichthyologist at the Swedish Museum.

== Taxon named in his honor ==
- Saxatilia sveni Ploeg, 1991 was named in his honor.
- Geophagus sveni is a Geophagini cichlid native to the Tocantins River drainage in Brazil.
- Apistogramma kullanderi

== Selected publications ==
Sources:

- Kullander, S.O. 1983. A revision of the South American Cichlid genus Cichlasoma (Teleostei: Cichlidae). Swedish Museum of Natural History, Stockholm. ISBN 91-86510-01-0
- Kullander, S.O. 1986. Cichlid fishes of the Amazon River drainage of Peru. Department of Vertebrate Zoology, Swedish Museum of Natural History, Stockholm. ISBN 91-86510-04-5
- Kullander, S.O. & H. Nijssen. 1989. The cichlids of Surinam: Teleostei, Labroidei. E.J. Brill, Leiden. ISBN 90-04-09077-0
- Kullander, S.O., T. Stach, H.G. Hansson, B. Delling & H. Blom. 2011. Nationalnyckeln till Sveriges flora och fauna. Ryggsträngsdjur: lansettfiskar – broskfiskar, Chordata: Branchiostomatidae – Chondrichthyes. ArtDatabanken, Uppsala

== Taxon described by him ==
- See Category:Taxa named by Sven O. Kullander

== Sources ==
- Sven O. Kullander Swedish Museum of Natural History
- Kullander's publications (personal page)
