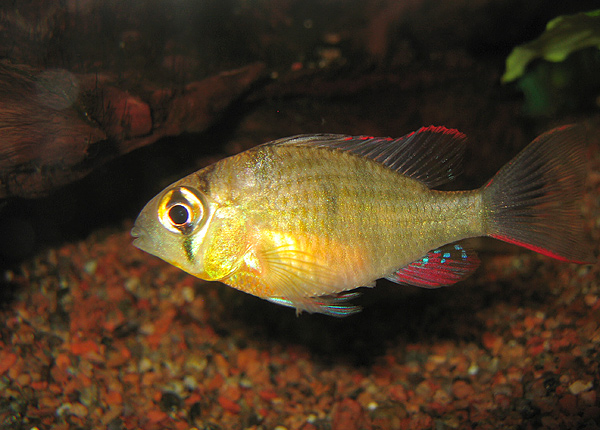

Conservation status
- Least Concern (IUCN 3.1)

Scientific classification
- Kingdom: Animalia
- Phylum: Chordata
- Class: Actinopterygii
- Order: Cichliformes
- Family: Cichlidae
- Genus: Mikrogeophagus
- Species: M. altispinosus

Binomial name
- Mikrogeophagus altispinosus (Haseman, 1911)

Synonyms
- Crenicara altispinosa Haseman, 1911; Microgeophagus altispinosus (Haseman, 1911); Papiliochromis altispinosus (Haseman, 1911)

= Mikrogeophagus altispinosus =

Species of fish

Mikrogeophagus altispinosus is a species of fish endemic to the southern Amazon River basin in Brazil and Bolivia. The species is part of the family Cichlidae and subfamily Geophaginae. It is a popular aquarium fish, traded under the common names Bolivian butterfly, Bolivian ram, Bolivian ram cichlid, and ruby crown cichlid.

== Range and habitat ==
The species occurs in the soft, near-neutral (pH 6.3–7.6) and warm waters of the Mamoré and lower Guaporé River drainages in Bolivia and Brazil. The type locality is the Mamoré River at San Joaquín (Beni Department, Bolivia).

A variant for years known to aquarium hobbyists as Mikrogeophagus sp. "Zweifleck/Two-patch" and found in the Pindaituba River (a tributary of the Sararé River, itself part of the upper Guaporé River basin) in Mato Grosso, Brazil, was described as a separate species, Mikrogeophagus maculicauda, in 2022.

== Appearance and sexual dimorphism ==
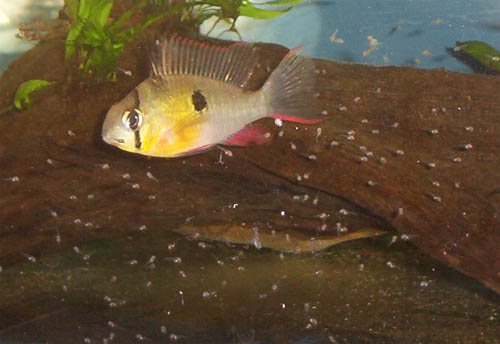
Female with newly free-swimming fry

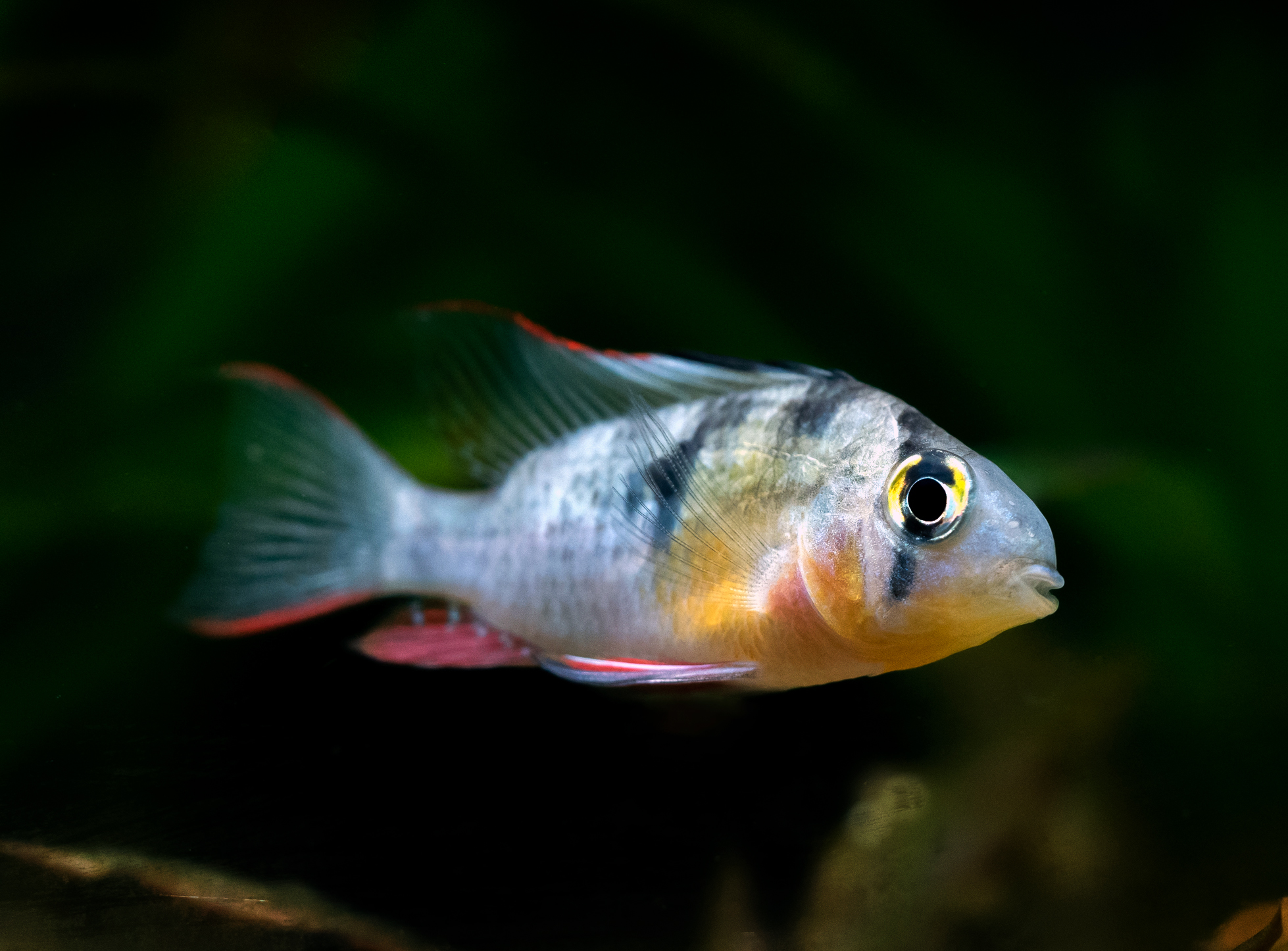
A male

The species is similar in profile to the larger geophagine cichlids. Maximum size is about 8 cm (3 in). The head and front half of the body is yellow, fading to olive-grey at the rear. A vertical black band runs across the eye, and six faint transverse stripes occur along the body; the third stripe is dark at its centre. The first few rays of the dorsal fin are black, and both the dorsal and caudal fin are edged in a pinkish red. The anal and pelvic fins are the same shade of red throughout with bright blue rays and dots.

The species displays only limited sexual dimorphism, mature males being slightly larger and in some cases showing longer extensions on both the caudal fin and the posterior of the dorsal fin.

== Diet ==
Omnivorous, this fish sifts the substrate for plant material and small organisms. It is capable of feeding in midwater or on the surface.

== Reproduction ==
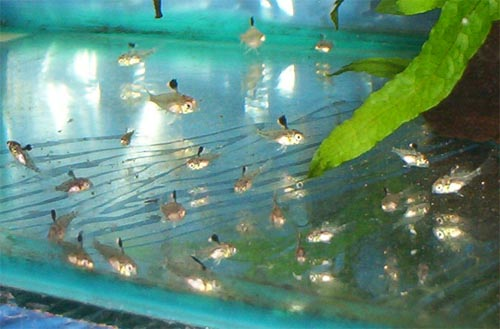
Aquarium raised fry at 8 weeks of age

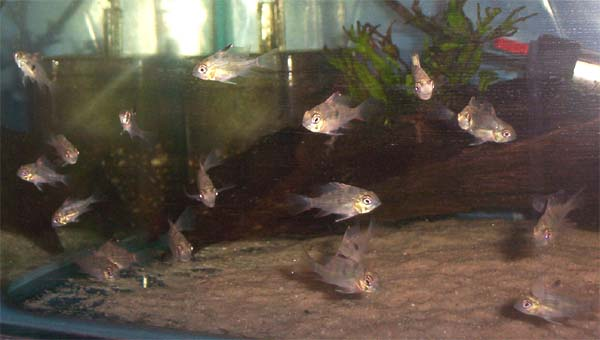
Young 17-week-old M. altispinosus in the aquarium

Bolivian rams are biparental, open-spawning cichlids. Limited data are available on reproduction in the wild; in captivity, though, courtship is known to involve various body movements including head shaking, quivering, and preparation of spawning sites, including shallow pits. These behaviours are mainly undertaken by the male and in aquaria are known to last around 48 hours. After courtship, the female deposits some 100–200 ovoid, brownish-coloured eggs on the chosen surface, normally a flattened stone, but occasionally a leaf. The eggs are laid in lines; when the female has laid one line, the male passes over it and fertilises the eggs; the female then continues on to the next line and so on until egg laying is complete. In aquariums at 27 °C (81 °F), eggs take about 60 hours to hatch. During this time, the clutch is primarily cared for by the female, which fans the eggs and often adds sand to the clutch, possibly to camouflage the eggs. Newly hatched fry are transported by the mouths of the parents to the shallow pits dug by the male during courtship and moved regularly between pits. The fry become free-swimming after seven days and are led about in a dense school by the parents for foraging.

== In the aquarium ==
Although less popular than its close relative Mikrogeophagus ramirezi, the Bolivian ram remains a commonly encountered cichlid for the aquarium. The species is also more tolerant of lower temperatures (22–26 °C (72–79 °F)) and a greater range of water conditions than M. ramirezi. So, M. altispinosus can be kept in some community aquariums, but assertive, active, or aggressive-feeding fish are not ideal companions for this relatively shy species.

Bolivian Rams appear to have a fluid 'stop-and-go' method of swimming, in which they typically move for a few paces, pause abruptly, then move again. In this, their bodily control is remarkable in that they appear to not be carried by momentum while stopping; they appear to 'freeze' instantaneously in place and 'hover,' before moving again. This is likely due to their instinctive drive to sift carefully through substrate for food, so as not to stir up debris with their fins. As such, they are generally bottom-feeders and typically will not venture into the higher regions of the aquarium. Their swimming style is usually gentle, but they can move surprisingly quickly when evading predators or chasing away territorial invaders.

An aquarium which mimics the natural environment of the species, i.e.: soft, acidic water with hiding places in the form of dense planted regions, or bogwood, is recommended. Aquarists classify M. altispinosus as a dwarf cichlid, and as such, it can be kept in relatively small aquaria, with minimum volumes being 80 L (20 gal). In captivity, the species is not a fussy feeder and readily accepts many commercially available fish foods.

== See also ==
- List of freshwater aquarium fish
