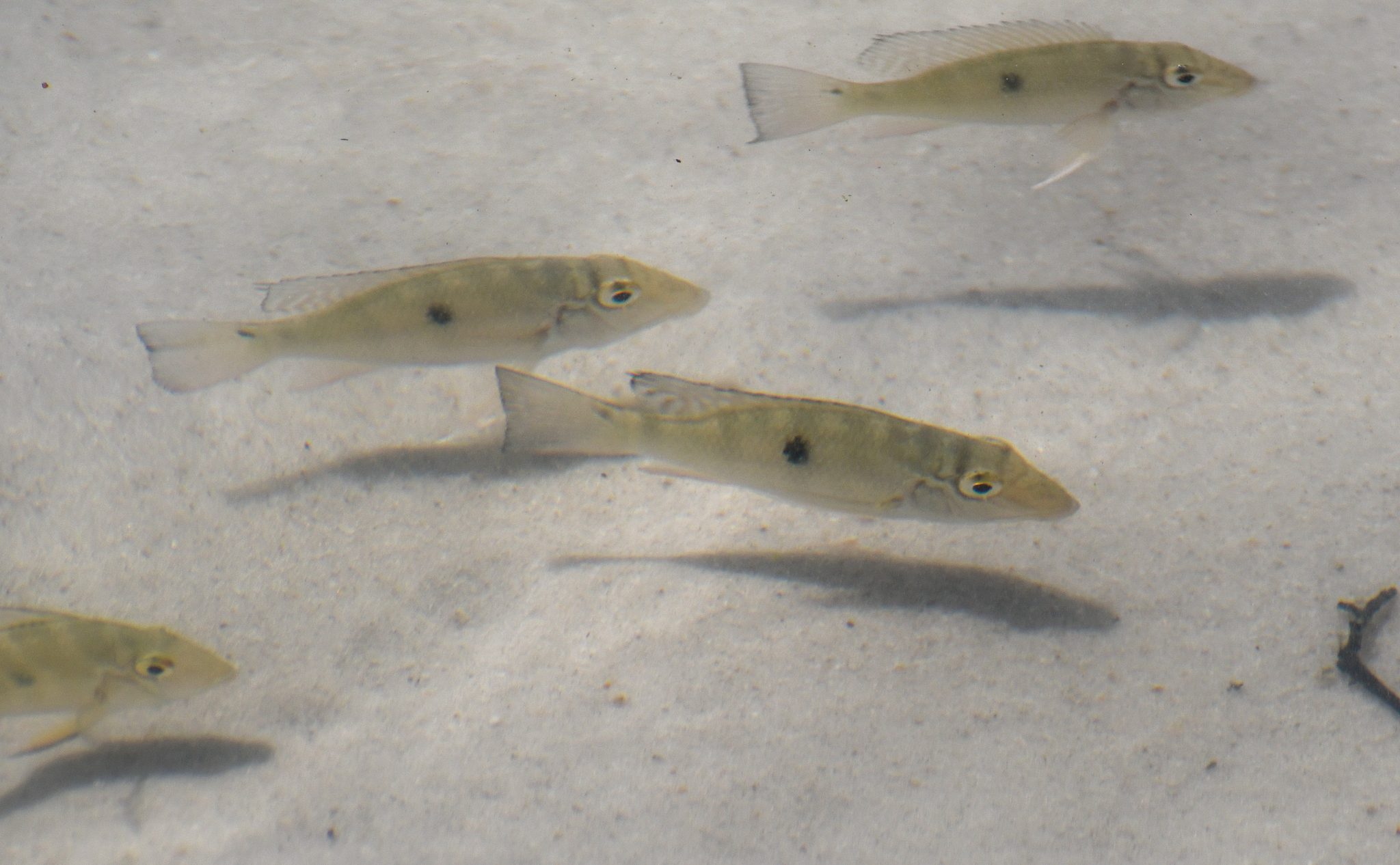

Conservation status
- Least Concern (IUCN 3.1)

Scientific classification
- Kingdom: Animalia
- Phylum: Chordata
- Class: Actinopterygii
- Order: Cichliformes
- Family: Cichlidae
- Genus: Satanoperca
- Species: S. lilith

Binomial name
- Satanoperca lilith Kullander & Ferreira, 1988

= Satanoperca lilith =

Species of cichlid fish

Satanoperca lilith, also known as the one-spotted eartheater or Lilith's eartheater, is a large species of eartheater cichlid endemic to blackwater rivers in Brazil, in the states of Amazonas, Pará, and Roraima. It is widely distributed throughout the northern Amazon basin.

== Taxonomy and etymology ==
The holotype specimen of this species, catalogued by the Museum of Zoology of the University of São Paulo's natural history collection as MZUSP 33003, was collected on October 6, 1979, in the Rio Negro drainage of Brazil.

The generic name of this species, Satanoperca, is a portmanteau of Satan and perca (Latin for "perch"). The specific name is a matronym dedicated to Lilith, a female demon in Mesopotamian and Jewish folklore, and was given as an allusion to its close relationship with Satanoperca daemon. In Brazil, this species is commonly known as the acará bicudo, cará, cará-bicudo, and cará-pucu.

Phylogenetic analysis indicates that the closest known relative of this species is Satanoperca daemon. Together with Satanoperca acuticeps, they form a morphologically distinct species group within the genus Satanoperca, characterized by the presence of a large, ocellated spot on the dorsal side of their caudal peduncle.

== Description ==
Satanoperca lilith is one of the largest species in Satanoperca, on average measuring 14 cm (5.5 in) standard length (SL), with a maximum recorded length of 25.5 cm (10.0 in) SL. It is only exceeded in length by Satanoperca jurupari, which can grow up to 26 cm (10 in) SL. The easiest way of distinguishing Satanoperca lilith from related species is the presence of a single dark blotch on its flanks, which is situated on or above scales 11–13 of its lateral line. Satanoperca daemon has two, Satanoperca auticeps has three, and members of the Satanoperca jurupari group have none.

== Habitat and ecology ==
Satanoperca lilith is native to blackwater rivers in the northern Amazon basin. Its native range extends from the Rio Japurá to the Trombetas River, and it has also been observed within the Rio Negro and Branco River basins. Due to its wide distribution, abundance throughout its range, and lack of significant threats to its survival, the IUCN Red List considers Satanoperca lilith to be a least concern species.

Like other members of its genus, Satanoperca lilith is omnivorous, and will vary its diet and foraging strategies depending on seasonal variations in the water level of its environment. During the wet season, when water levels are high, Satanoperca lilith will mostly feed on aquatic insect larvae (such as larval flies, beetles, and caddisflies) and planktonic crustaceans (such as ostracods, water fleas, and clam shrimp) – roughly 65% of their dietary volume during this time will consist of arthropods alone, with only 8.6% of their diet consisting of plant matter (mostly fruits and seeds). The dry season corresponds with a marked shift in their diet from arthropods (now comprising just 28.3% of their diet) towards feeding on plant matter (now up to 27.3%, and mostly consisting of leaves). This, in conjunction with the increased prevalence of sand grains in their stomach contents (2.2% during the wet season, to 15.7% during the dry season), indicates that their foraging strategy shifts from active predation at the water's surface to sifting through detritus when water levels are low.

== Relationship with humans ==
Satanoperca lilith is one of several species commonly used as bait by boat tour operators to attract Amazon river dolphins during the dry season. Among the Ribeirinhos of the Amazon rainforest, it is consumed as traditional medicine to treat illness.

Prior to being formally described in 1988, this species was sold in the aquarium trade as a morph of Satanoperca daemon. It is not commonly sought out by exporters—between the years of 2006 to 2015, only 1,069 specimens of Satanoperca lilith were exported from the Amazonas state of Brazil for the ornamental fish trade.
