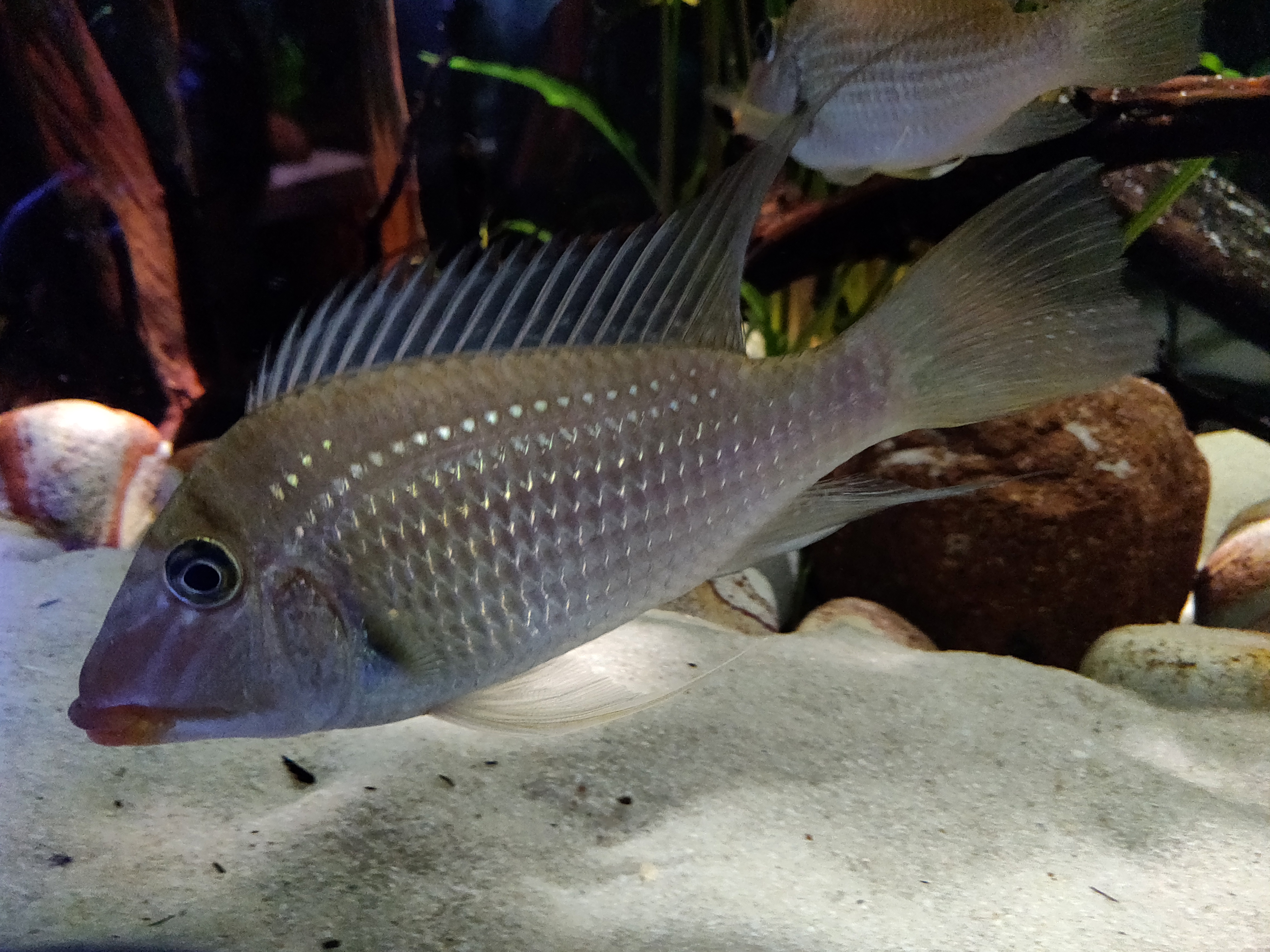
- Satanoperca jurupari, London Zoo.

Conservation status
- Least Concern (IUCN 3.1)

Scientific classification
- Kingdom: Animalia
- Phylum: Chordata
- Class: Actinopterygii
- Order: Cichliformes
- Family: Cichlidae
- Genus: Satanoperca
- Species: S. jurupari

Binomial name
- Satanoperca jurupari (Heckel, 1840)

Synonyms
- Geophagus jurupari Heckel, 1840

= Satanoperca jurupari =

Demon eartheater

Species of fish

Satanoperca jurupari, the demon eartheater, is a species of cichlid endemic to the Amazon basin in South America. It can reach a length of 18.5 centimetres (7.3 in) SL.

== Feeding behavior and diet ==
Like some other Geophagini cichlids, the common name 'eartheater' is attributed to their common feeding strategy of sifting through substrate (e.g., sand, small rock, silt) for food, where mouthfuls of substrate are taken up and sorted in the buccal cavity for food items. With the help of gill rakers, food is sorted and substrate is either spat out or sifted out from the operculum. While generally considered to be an invertivore, it has been documented as an omnivore in systems that have been disturbed by human activity.

== Commercial importance ==
This species is of little importance to local commercial fisheries but has grown in popularity among the aquarium trade over the past several years.

== Breeding and reproduction ==
As with most cichlids, this species does exhibit parental care. Parents will typically spawn in selected substrate and, after 24 hours, incubate eggs in the buccal cavity where young will seek refuge during the larval stage.

== Behavior ==
This fish is usually peaceful, until the mating season, when it becomes very aggressive.
