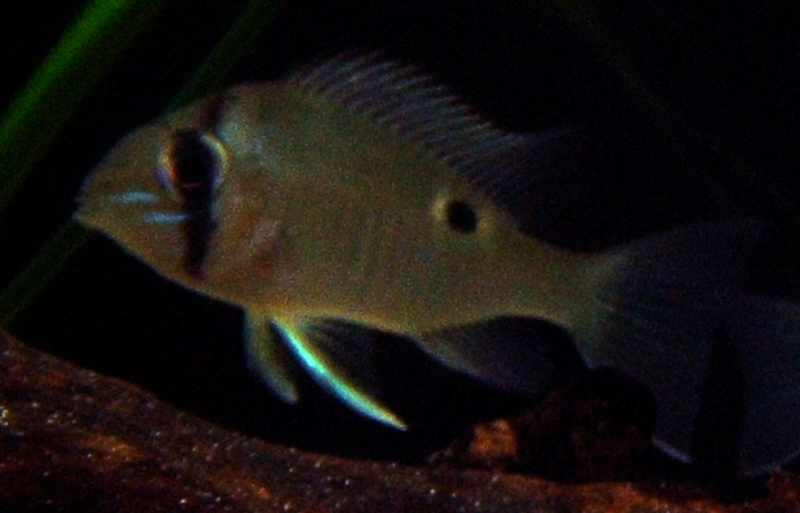
- Biotodoma cupido

Scientific classification
- Kingdom: Animalia
- Phylum: Chordata
- Class: Actinopterygii
- Division: Teleostei
- Order: Cichliformes
- Family: Cichlidae
- Subfamily: Cichlinae
- Tribe: Geophagini
- Subtribe: Geophagina
- Genus: Biotodoma; C. H. Eigenmann & C. H. Kennedy, 1903

Type species
- Geophagus cupido Heckel, 1840

= Biotodoma =

Genus of fishes

Biotodoma is a small genus of cichlids native to rivers in the Amazon, Orinoco and Essequibo basins in South America.

== Species ==
There are two currently recognized species in the genus, but additional cryptic species are known to exist.

- Biotodoma cupido (Heckel, 1840) (green-streaked eartheater)
- Biotodoma wavrini (J. P. Gosse, 1963) (Orinoco eartheater)
