= Biotodoma wavrini =

Scientific classification
- Domain: Eukaryota
- Kingdom: Animalia
- Phylum: Chordata
- Class: Actinopterygii
- Order: Cichliformes
- Family: Cichlidae
- Genus: Biotodoma
- Species: B. wavrini

Binomial name
- Biotodoma wavrini (Gosse, 1963)

Synonyms
- Geophagus wavrini Gosse, 1963

Species of fish

Biotodoma wavrini (Orinoco eartheater), is a species of cichlid in the tribe Geophagini, part of the American cichlid subfamily Cichlinae. It is found in the middle and upper Rio Negro drainage in Brazil and Venezuela, and in the Orinoco River basin in Colombia and Venezuela. B. wavrini is around 10 cm in length. The Orinoco eartheater poses no threats to humans.

== Etymology ==
Its specific name honours the Belgian aristocrat, ethnologist and explorer Marquis Robert de Wavrin de Villers-au-Tertre (1888–1971), who collected the type specimen in 1935.
