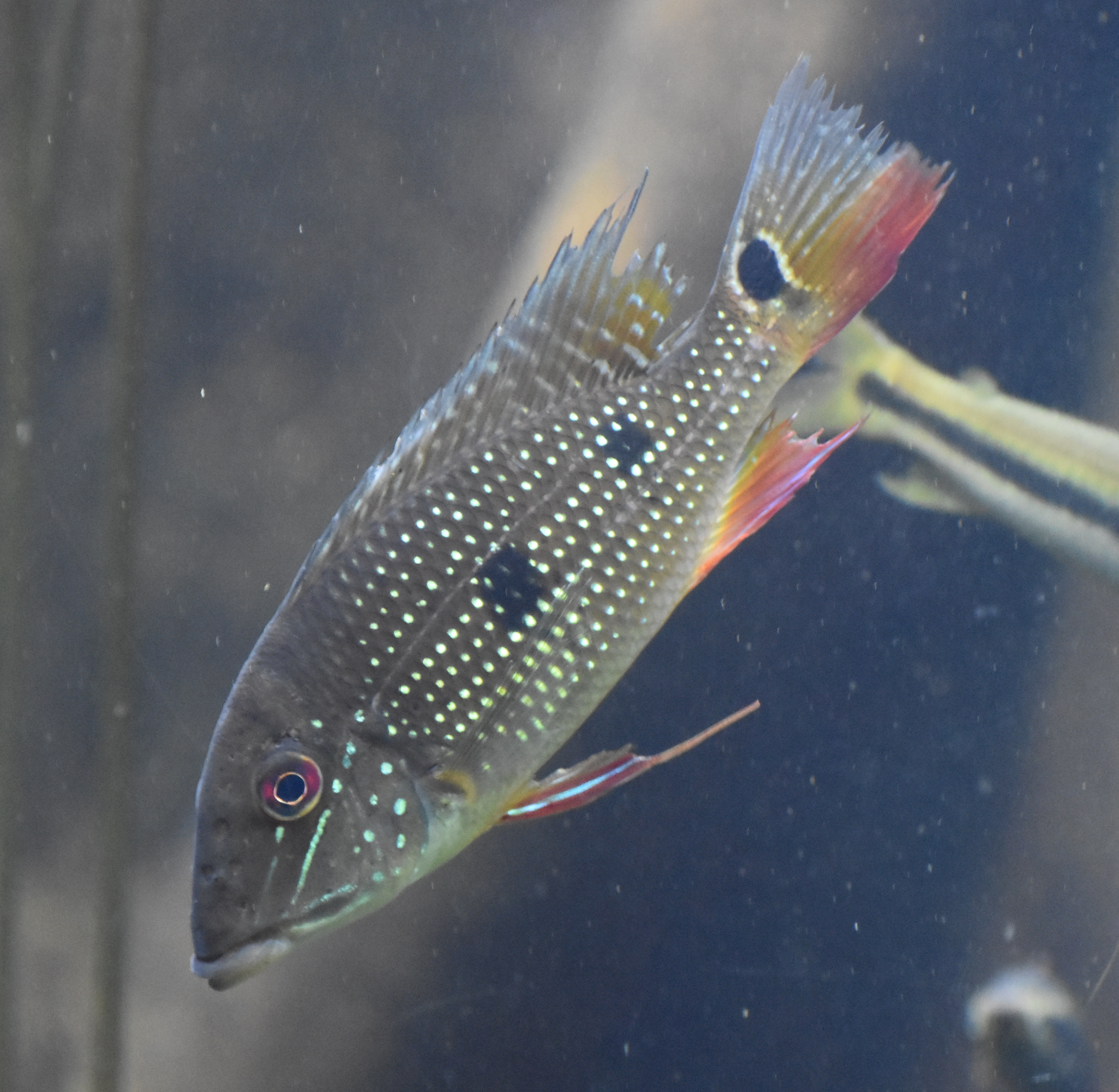
- S. daemon

Scientific classification
- Kingdom: Animalia
- Phylum: Chordata
- Class: Actinopterygii
- Division: Teleostei
- Order: Cichliformes
- Family: Cichlidae
- Subfamily: Cichlinae
- Tribe: Geophagini
- Subtribe: Geophagina
- Genus: Satanoperca; Günther, 1862

Type species
- Geophagus daemon Heckel, 1840

= Satanoperca =

Genus of fishes

Satanoperca is a small genus of cichlids from South America, where they are known from the Orinoco, Essequibo, Nickerie, Amazon and Paraná–Paraguay river basins. They are mainly found in areas with slow-moving waters, but some species have also been recorded from rapids.

They are part of a group popularly known as eartheaters and feed by picking up mouthfuls of sand to sift out food items such as invertebrates, plant material and detritus (the only exception is mid-water feeding S. acuticeps). They often feed in small groups and one individual may act as a watchman, which will charge an approaching piranha with its mouth open and fins erected. The Satanoperca in the group take turn acting as watchman.

Satanoperca are up to 25.5 cm (10 in) in standard length, but the smallest species reach less than 2/3 that size. The species fall into two or three main groups: The S. daemon group (including S. lilith) are relatively large, and have a distinct dark spot on the tail and one or two dark spots on the side of the body. S. acuticeps is rather similar and variably placed in its own group or included in the S. daemon group, but it has three dark spots on the body and a differently shaped mouth. The remaining species are part of the S. jurupari group, which may have a small tail-spot and may have a poorly defined pattern of dark bands or blotches on the body, but always lack distinct dark spots on the body.

== Species ==
There are currently 10 recognized species in this genus. Additionally, several undescribed species are known.

- Satanoperca acuticeps (Heckel, 1840) (Sharphead eartheater)
- Satanoperca curupira Ota et al., 2018
- Satanoperca daemon (Heckel, 1840) (Threespot eartheater)
- Satanoperca jurupari (Heckel, 1840) (Demon eartheater)
- Satanoperca leucosticta (J. P. Müller & Troschel, 1848)
- Satanoperca lilith S. O. Kullander & E. J. G. Ferreira, 1988 (One-spotted eartheater, Lilith's eartheater)
- Satanoperca mapiritensis (Fernández-Yépez, 1950)
- Satanoperca pappaterra (Heckel, 1840) (Pantanal eartheater)
- Satanoperca rhynchitis S. O. Kullander, 2012
- Satanoperca setepele Ota, Deprá, Kullander, Graça & Pavanelli, 2022
