= Gymnogeophagus lipokarenos =

Scientific classification
- Kingdom: Animalia
- Phylum: Chordata
- Class: Actinopterygii
- Order: Cichliformes
- Family: Cichlidae
- Genus: Gymnogeophagus
- Species: G. lipokarenos

Binomial name
- Gymnogeophagus lipokarenos L. R. Malabarba, M. C. Malabarba & R. E. dos Reis, 2015

Species of fish

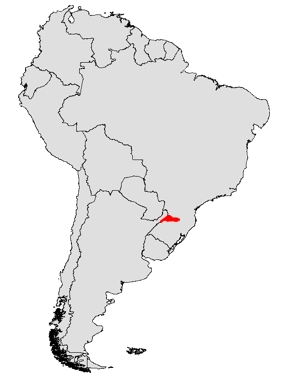
Global distribution of the species

Gymnogeophagus lipokarenos is a species of geophagine cichlid. It inhabits parts of the Uruguay and Río Negro rivers. It is characterised by the absence of supraneural bones, the presence of a forward spine in its first dorsal fin pterygiophore, the absence of an oblique bar between the eye and nape, possessing a black marking near the dorsal fin origin that projects to its dorsum, as well as other features.
