= Apistogramma barlowi =

Conservation status
- Least Concern (IUCN 3.1)

Scientific classification
- Kingdom: Animalia
- Phylum: Chordata
- Class: Actinopterygii
- Order: Cichliformes
- Family: Cichlidae
- Tribe: Geophagini
- Subtribe: Geophagina
- Genus: Apistogramma
- Species: A. barlowi

Binomial name
- Apistogramma barlowi U. Römer, & I. J. Hahn, 2008

Species of fish

Apistogramma barlowi is a species of dwarf cichlid in the Geophagini tribe of the subfamily Cichlinae, the American cichlids. It is found in forest streams northwest of Pebas town in northern Peru. It was first discovered in Peru in 2000 and scientifically described in 2008. Apistogramma barlowi is a freshwater fish that grows to a length of 6.5 cm (2.6 in). There are two forms which occur in separate parts of its range: a red form that is darker and has red marks on the head, and a white form that is paler. The specific name is in honor of the ichthyologist George W. Barlow.

The fish has previously been known under the trade name Apistogramma sp. "mouthbrooder", "Maulbrüter" or "Brustband".

== Spawning ==
This species is a facultative, biparental larvophilous mouthbrooder, which is unusual in the genus Apistogramma. Like other members of the genus, they spawn in caves. After the fry have hatched, the female and/or male keeps them in their mouth until they are free-swimming. This species may also keep the eggs and young fry in a shallow pit throughout the brood care process, thus bypassing a mouthbrooding phase. Males are more likely to exclusively mouthbrood the fry when strong water currents are present.

== Habitat ==
Apistogramma barlowi prefers relatively cool and clear fast-flowing forest streams with an acidic to neutral pH. In one case, the habitat was a 1 m (3.3 ft) wide stream with a sandy bottom (no aquatic plants or large stones), a pH of 4.8 and a temperature of 29 °C (84 °F) (this is the upper limit of the usual temperature range of waters where the species occurs).
