= Gymnogeophagus constellatus =

Scientific classification
- Domain: Eukaryota
- Kingdom: Animalia
- Phylum: Chordata
- Class: Actinopterygii
- Order: Cichliformes
- Family: Cichlidae
- Genus: Gymnogeophagus
- Species: G. constellatus

Binomial name
- Gymnogeophagus constellatus L. R. Malabarba, M. C. Malabarba & R. E. dos Reis, 2015
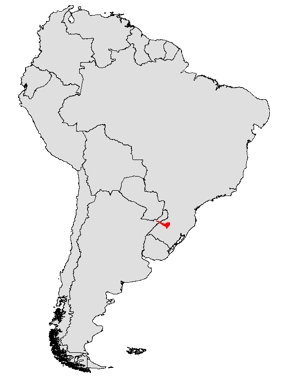
- Distribution of Gymnogeophagus constellatus (red)

Species of fish

Gymnogeophagus constellatus is a species of geophagine cichlid. It inhabits parts of the Uruguay and Río Negro rivers in eastern Rio Grande do Sul. It is characterised by the absence of supraneural bones, the presence of a forward spine in its first dorsal fin pterygiophore, the absence of an oblique bar between the eye and nape, possessing a black marking near the dorsal fin origin that projects to its dorsum, as well as other features.
