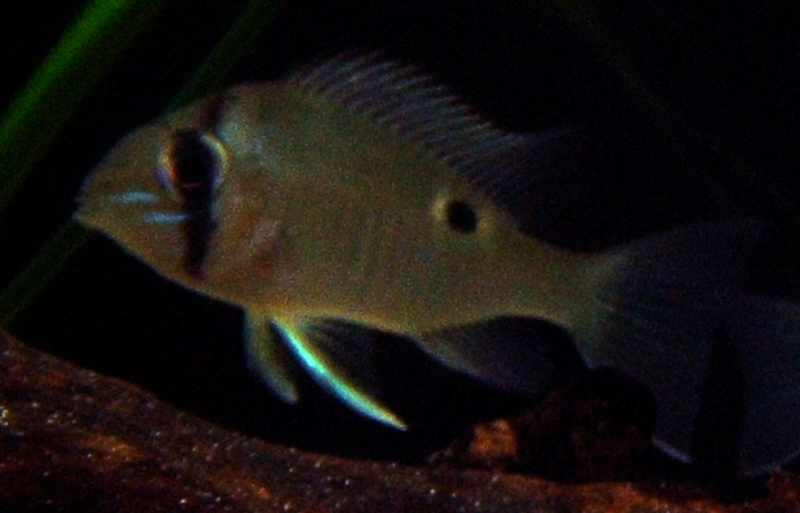

Scientific classification
- Domain: Eukaryota
- Kingdom: Animalia
- Phylum: Chordata
- Class: Actinopterygii
- Order: Cichliformes
- Family: Cichlidae
- Genus: Biotodoma
- Species: B. cupido

Binomial name
- Biotodoma cupido (Heckel, 1840)

Synonyms
- Geophagus cupido Heckel, 1840

= Biotodoma cupido =

Species of fish

Biotodoma cupido, commonly known as the green-streaked eartheater or cupid cichlid, is a species of cichlid native to the Amazon and Essequibo basins in Bolivia, Brazil, Colombia, Guayana, and Peru. It is sometimes seen in the aquarium trade. It was originally described in 1840 as Geophas cupido.

The maximum known standard length is 11.7 cm (4.6 in) and the maximum published weight is 55.32 g (1.95 oz).
