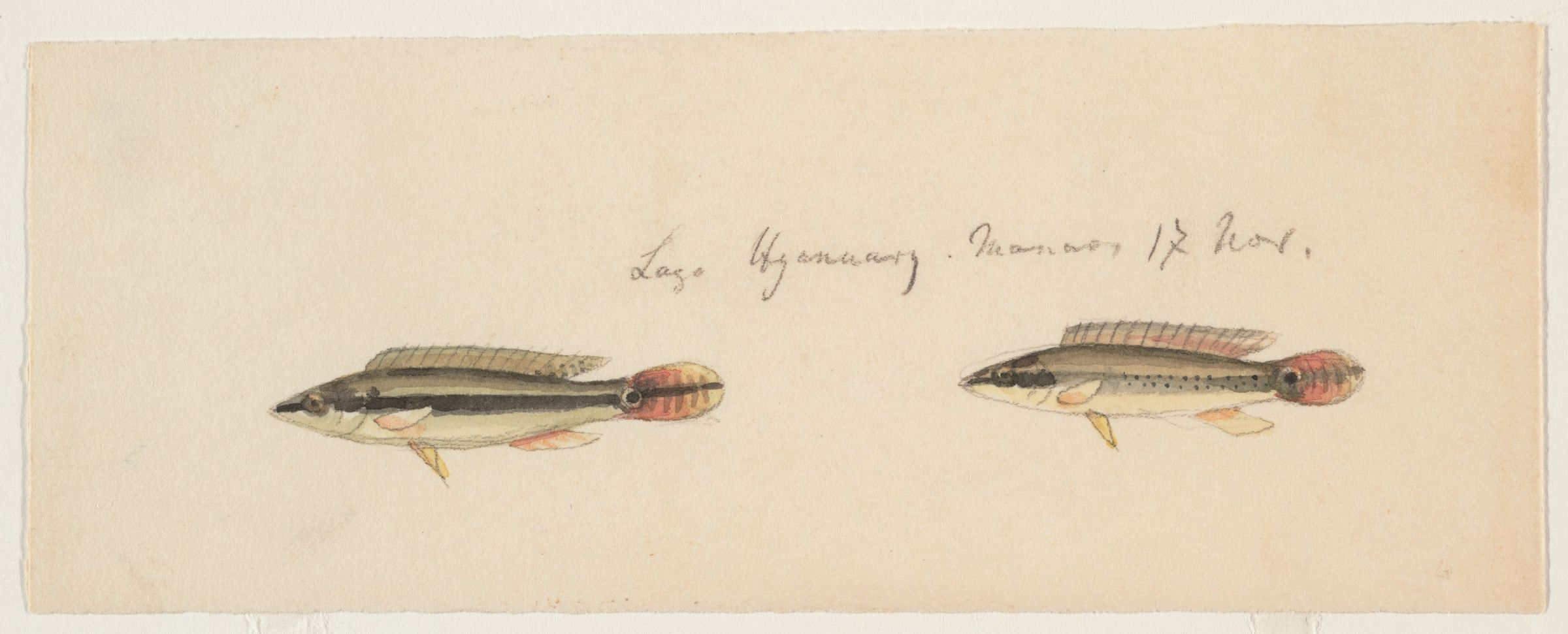
- 1865 watercolor illustration

Conservation status
- Least Concern (IUCN 3.1)

Scientific classification
- Kingdom: Animalia
- Phylum: Chordata
- Class: Actinopterygii
- Order: Cichliformes
- Family: Cichlidae
- Genus: Wallaciia
- Species: W. wallacii

Binomial name
- Wallaciia wallacii (Regan, 1905)

Synonyms
- Crenicichla wallacii

= Wallaciia wallacii =

Species of fish

Wallaciia wallacii is a species of cichlid native to South America. It is found in the Essequibo River basin, Guyana. This species reaches a length of 8.5 cm (3.3 in).

The fish is named in honor of English naturalist Alfred Russel Wallace (1823–1913), who collected, but subsequently lost during transport, and illustrated a similar species (probably W. notophthalmus), which British ichthyologist Charles Tate Regan thought might be identical to this one, in his expedition to the Rio Negro and Rio Uaupés region in the years 1850 to 1852.
