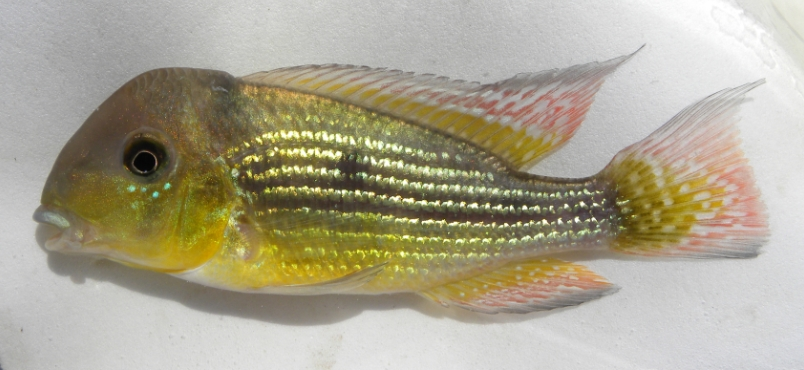

Scientific classification
- Domain: Eukaryota
- Kingdom: Animalia
- Phylum: Chordata
- Class: Actinopterygii
- Order: Cichliformes
- Family: Cichlidae
- Genus: Gymnogeophagus
- Species: G. tiraparae

Binomial name
- Gymnogeophagus tiraparae González-Bergonzoni, Loureiro & Oviedo
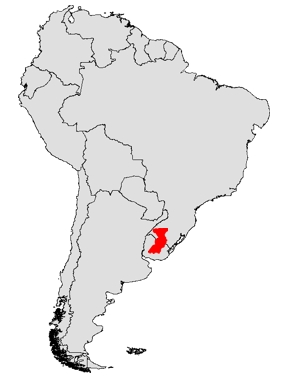
- Distribution of Gymnogeophagus tiraparae (red)

= Gymnogeophagus tiraparae =

Species of fish

Gymnogeophagus tiraparae is a species of Geophagine cichlid. Before the scientific description, this fish was referred to by the name Gymnogeophagus sp "San Borja".

It is found in Rio Negro in Uruguay and in the Tacuari River in the Laguna Mirim basin. It has a distinct hump on the head. The body is laterally compressed. The largest specimens found had a standard length of 13 cm. Gymnogeophagus tiraparae inhabits large rivers with clear water.

This species is probably closely related to Gymnogeophagus gymnogenys.

Gymnogeophagus tiraparae was named after a Guarani woman, Maria Luisa Tiraparae, who discovered the species in the vanished native town of San Borja del Yi, Uruguay.
