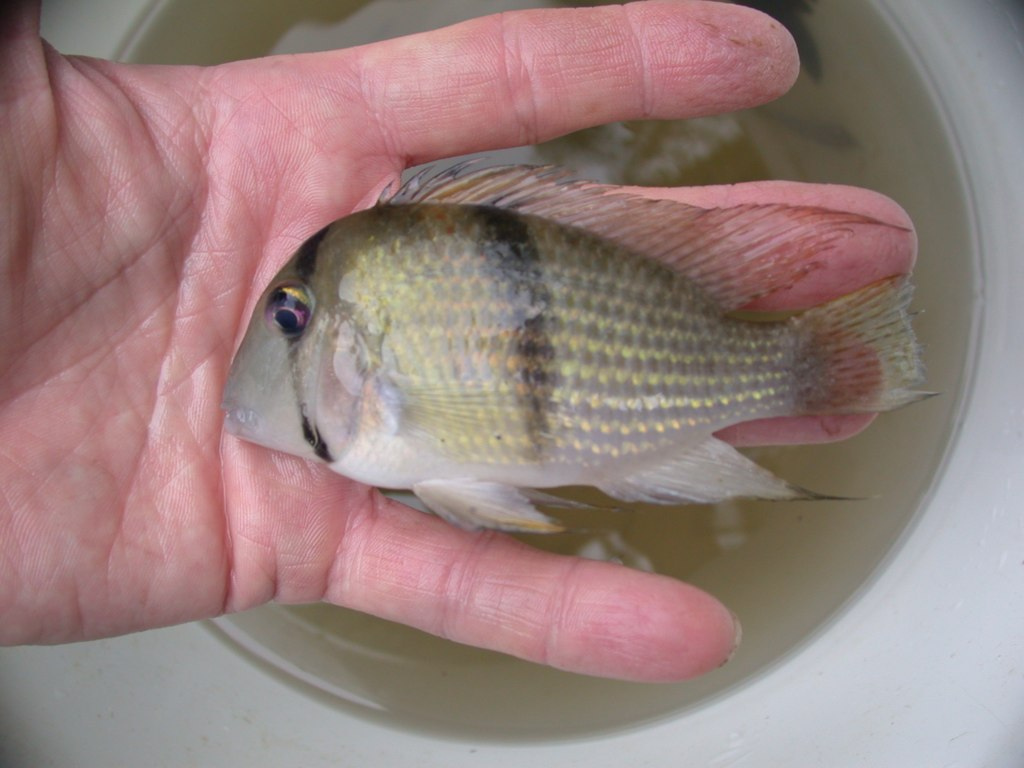
- Guianacara sphenozona
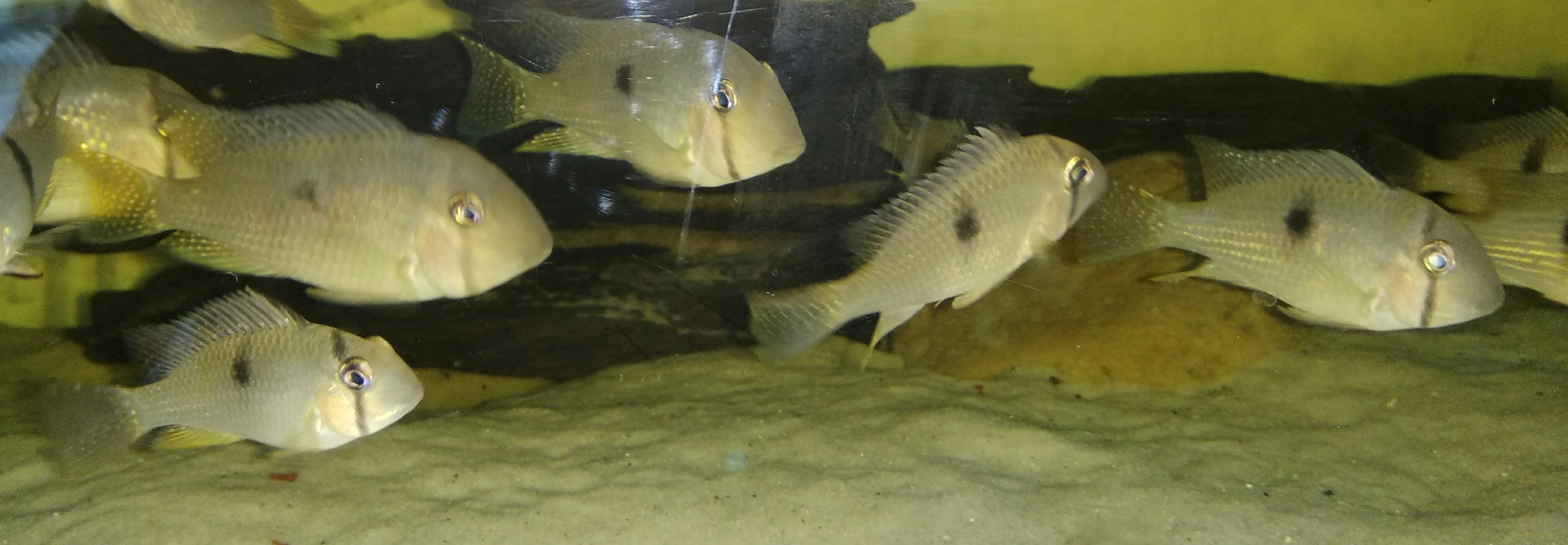
- Guianacara stergiosi

Scientific classification
- Domain: Eukaryota
- Kingdom: Animalia
- Phylum: Chordata
- Class: Actinopterygii
- Order: Cichliformes
- Family: Cichlidae
- Subfamily: Cichlinae
- Tribe: Geophagini
- Subtribe: Acarichthyina
- Genus: Guianacara; Kullander & Nijssen, 1989

Type species
- Guianacara owroewefi Kullander & Nijssen 1989

= Guianacara =

Genus of fishes

Guianacara is a small genus of cichlid fish endemic to freshwater habitats in the Guiana Shield in South America. They mostly live in moderately flowing clear- or blackwater rivers and streams, but also occur in lagoons that are seasonally flooded. They are typically found over bottoms consisting of sandy patches intermixed with large rocks.

The different species all have a dark line through the eye (its strength varies), but the adults can be separated by the appearance of the dark bar or spot on the mid-body. They reach up to 12 cm (4.7 in) in standard length. They mainly feed on small invertebrates.

== Species ==
The seven recognized species in this genus are:

- Guianacara cuyunii López-Fernández, Taphorn & Kullander, 2006
- Guianacara dacrya Arbour & López-Fernández, 2011
- Guianacara geayi (Pellegrin, 1902)
- Guianacara oelemariensis Kullander & Nijssen, 1989
- Guianacara owroewefi Kullander & Nijssen, 1989
- Guianacara sphenozona Kullander & Nijssen, 1989
- Guianacara stergiosi López-Fernández, Taphorn & Kullander, 2006
