= Wallaciia compressiceps =

Conservation status
- Data Deficient (IUCN 3.1)

Scientific classification
- Kingdom: Animalia
- Phylum: Chordata
- Class: Actinopterygii
- Order: Cichliformes
- Family: Cichlidae
- Genus: Wallaciia
- Species: W. compressiceps

Binomial name
- Wallaciia compressiceps Ploeg, 1986

Synonyms
- Crenicichla compressiceps

Species of fish

Wallaciia compressiceps is a species of cichlid native to South America. It is found in the Amazon River basin and in the lower Tocantins River basin. This species reaches a length of 5.7 cm (2.2 in).
