= Wallaciia heckeli =

Conservation status
- Least Concern (IUCN 3.1)

Scientific classification
- Kingdom: Animalia
- Phylum: Chordata
- Class: Actinopterygii
- Order: Cichliformes
- Family: Cichlidae
- Genus: Wallaciia
- Species: W. heckeli

Binomial name
- Wallaciia heckeli (Ploeg, 1989)

Synonyms
- Crenicichla heckeli

Species of fish

Wallaciia heckeli is a species of cichlid native to South America. It is found in the Amazon River basin and in the Trombetas River close to Cachoeira Porteira, Brazil. This species reaches a length of 5.2 cm (2.0 in).

The fish is named in honour of Austrian ichthyologist Johann Jakob Heckel (1790–1857), who proposed the genus Crenicichla, in which this fish was formerly placed, in 1840 and described its first ten species of which eight are still valid today, in three genera.
