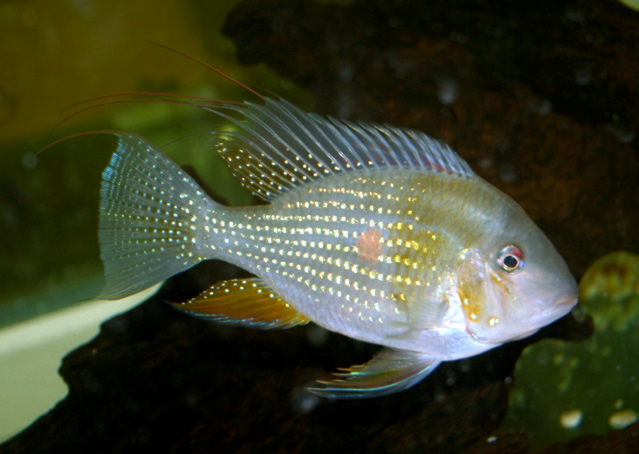
- An adult

Scientific classification
- Kingdom: Animalia
- Phylum: Chordata
- Class: Actinopterygii
- Order: Cichliformes
- Family: Cichlidae
- Tribe: Geophagini
- Subtribe: Acarichthyina
- Genus: Acarichthys; C. H. Eigenmann, 1912
- Species: A. heckelii

Binomial name
- Acarichthys heckelii (J. P. Müller & Troschel, 1849)

Synonyms
- Acara heckelii Müller & Troschel, 1849; Geophagus thayeri Steindachner, 1875; Acara subocularis Cope, 1878

= Threadfin acara =

Species of fish

The threadfin acara (Acarichthys heckelii), also known as Heckel's thread-finned acara, is a South American species of cichlid fish. It is the only member of the genus Acarichthys and is native to rivers in the Amazon and Essequibo basins in tropical South America, and has become established in southeastern Asia. It is sometimes found in the aquarium trade.

== Taxonomy and etymology ==
The threadfin acara was first described in 1848 by the German zoologists J. P. Müller and Troschel as Acara heckelii, and in 1912 was placed by C. H. Eigenmann in the monotypic genus Acarichthys. Its common name is the "threadfin acara", referring to the elongated, free rays at the posterior end of the dorsal fin. The specific name honours the Austrian ichthyologist Johann Jakob Heckel (1790-1857), one of the pioneers in the study of cichlids.

== Description ==
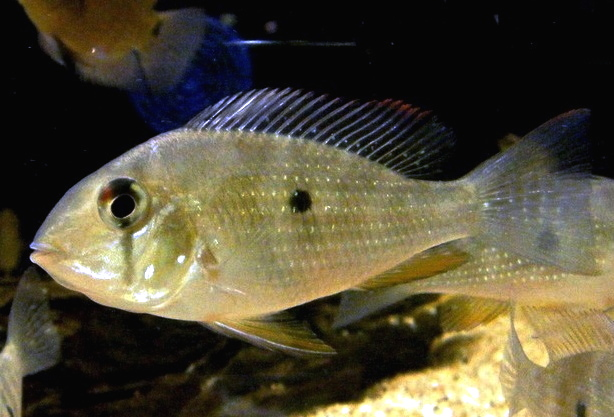
Subadult

This is a laterally-compressed, deep-bodied fish with a brownish-silver upper body, silvery flanks and a pale belly. There is a vertical black streak below the eye, a black blotch on the front few rays of the dorsal fin and a small black spot on the flanks below the centre of the dorsal fin.

== Distribution ==
The species is native to the Amazon and Essequibo basins in tropical South America. It has been introduced to Singapore and other parts of southeast Asia, perhaps having originated from aquaculture or aquaria. It is one of about ten species of South American cichlid to have become established in this part of Asia.

== Ecology ==
A. heckelii is a benthic feeder, sifting through sand or mud on the river bed and feeding on the invertebrates present. The male fish has a harem of female fish. The eggs are laid in a breeding chamber that has been dug in the bottom by the female and a chamber has one or several long entrance tunnels. The eggs are cared for by the female, and the male stays outside and defends the entrances. After hatching, both parents care for the young and defend them, and the juveniles remain gregarious when independent of their parents.

== See also ==
- List of freshwater aquarium fish species
