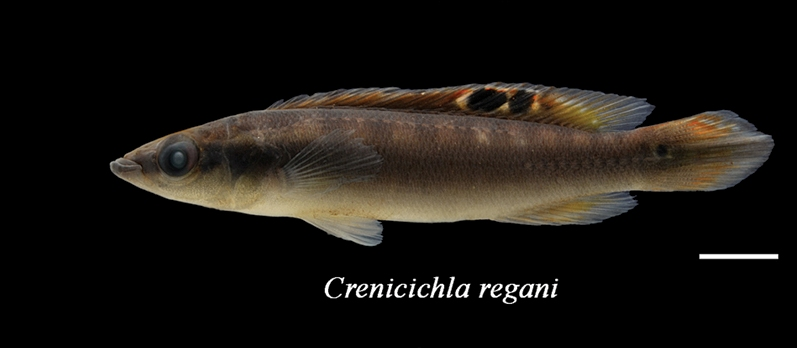
- Wallaciia regani, Synonym: Crenicichla regani

Scientific classification
- Kingdom: Animalia
- Phylum: Chordata
- Class: Actinopterygii
- Order: Cichliformes
- Family: Cichlidae
- Subfamily: Cichlinae
- Tribe: Geophagini
- Genus: Wallaciia; Varella, Kullander, Menezes, López-Fernández & Oliveira, 2023

Type species
- Crenicichla wallacii Regan, 1905

= Wallaciia =

Genus of fishes

Wallaciia is a South American genus of cichlids from the tribe Geophagini. The genus was only erected in mid-2023 by four South American ichthyologists and their Swedish colleague Sven O. Kullander. It was named in honour of the British naturalist Alfred Russel Wallace, and is a near-tautonym of the chosen type species. Previously, the species placed in Wallaciia belonged to the genus Crenicichla and formed the Crenicichla wallacii species complex. The genus Wallaciia occurs in the Amazon Basin from the Rio Madeira to the Rio Tocantins, but is absent west of Santo Antônio do Içá or the mouth of the Río Putumayo into the Amazon. The genus is also found in the drainage basins of the Orinoco and the Essequibo.

== Description ==
Like all pike cichlids, Wallaciia species have a pike-like, elongated body. The number of vertebrae is high and there are more trunk vertebrae than tail vertebrae, while in most other cichlid genera it is the other way round. Wallaciia species are relatively small pike cichlids and reach a standard length of 5.2 to 8.5 centimetres (2.0 to 3.3 in) and are referred to as "dwarf cichlids" for the aquarium hobby. With the exception of Wallaciia heckeli, the rear edge of the supracleithrum, a bone in the shoulder girdle, is serrated. The rear edge of the preoperculum is also serrated, the teeth are spine-like. The pectoral fin is supported by 13 to 14 fin rays. The scales in front of the dorsal fin are reduced. The pelvic fins are rounded, with the second fin ray being the longest. With an orbit diameter of 7.8 to 12.6% of the standard length, the eyes are relatively large. In contrast to the genus Saxatilia, Wallaciia lacks the humeral spot above the pectoral fin base.

== Species ==
The genus Wallaciia includes the following species:

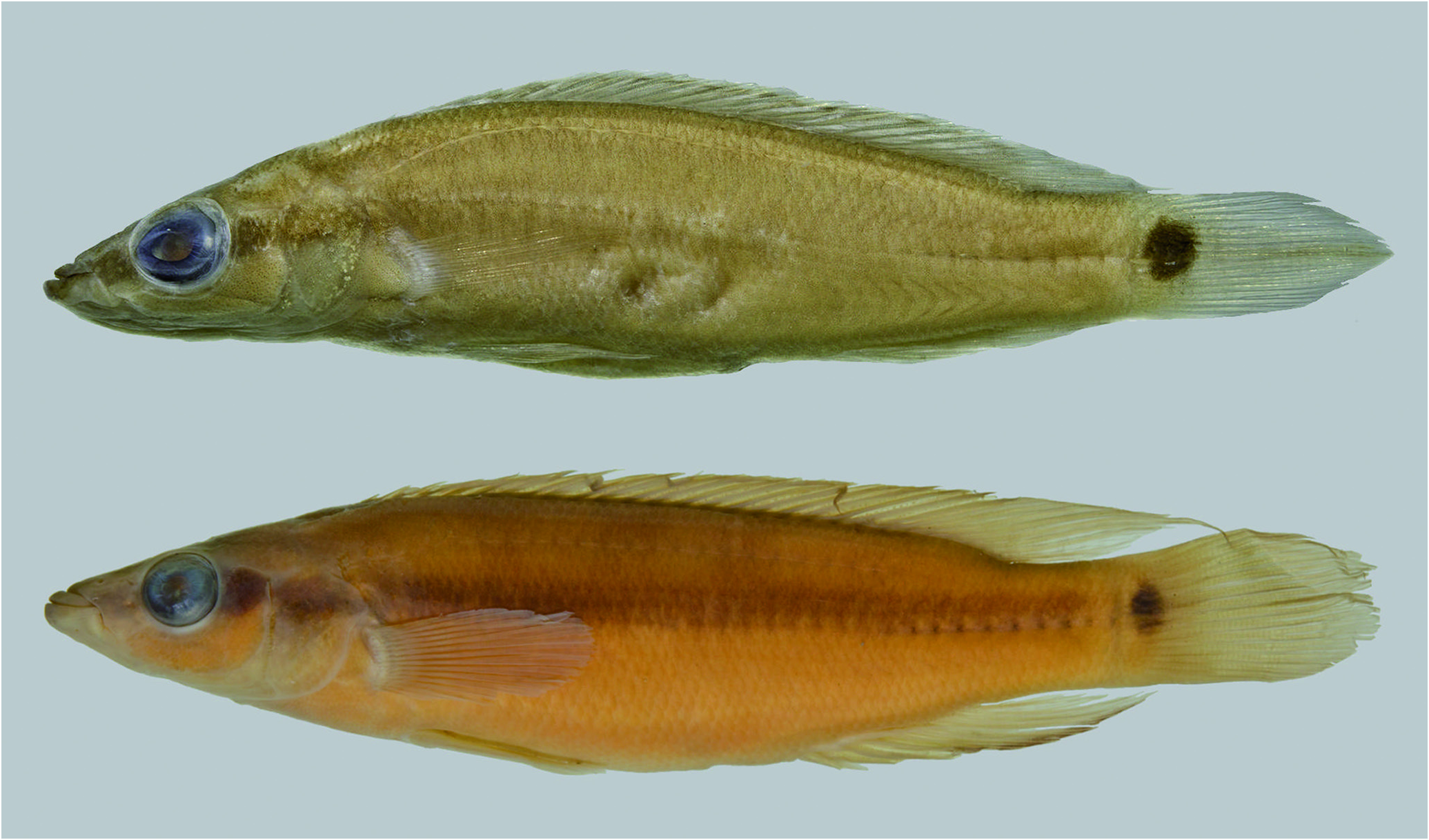
Wallaciia urosema and W. virgatula, preserved

- Wallaciia anamiri (Ito & Rapp Py-Daniel, 2015)
- Wallaciia compressiceps (Ploeg, 1986)
- Wallaciia heckeli (Ploeg, 1989)
- Wallaciia notophthalmus (Regan, 1913)
- Wallaciia regani (Ploeg, 1989)
- Wallaciia urosema (Kullander, 1990)
- Wallaciia virgatula (Ploeg, 1991)
- Wallaciia wallacii (Regan, 1905)
