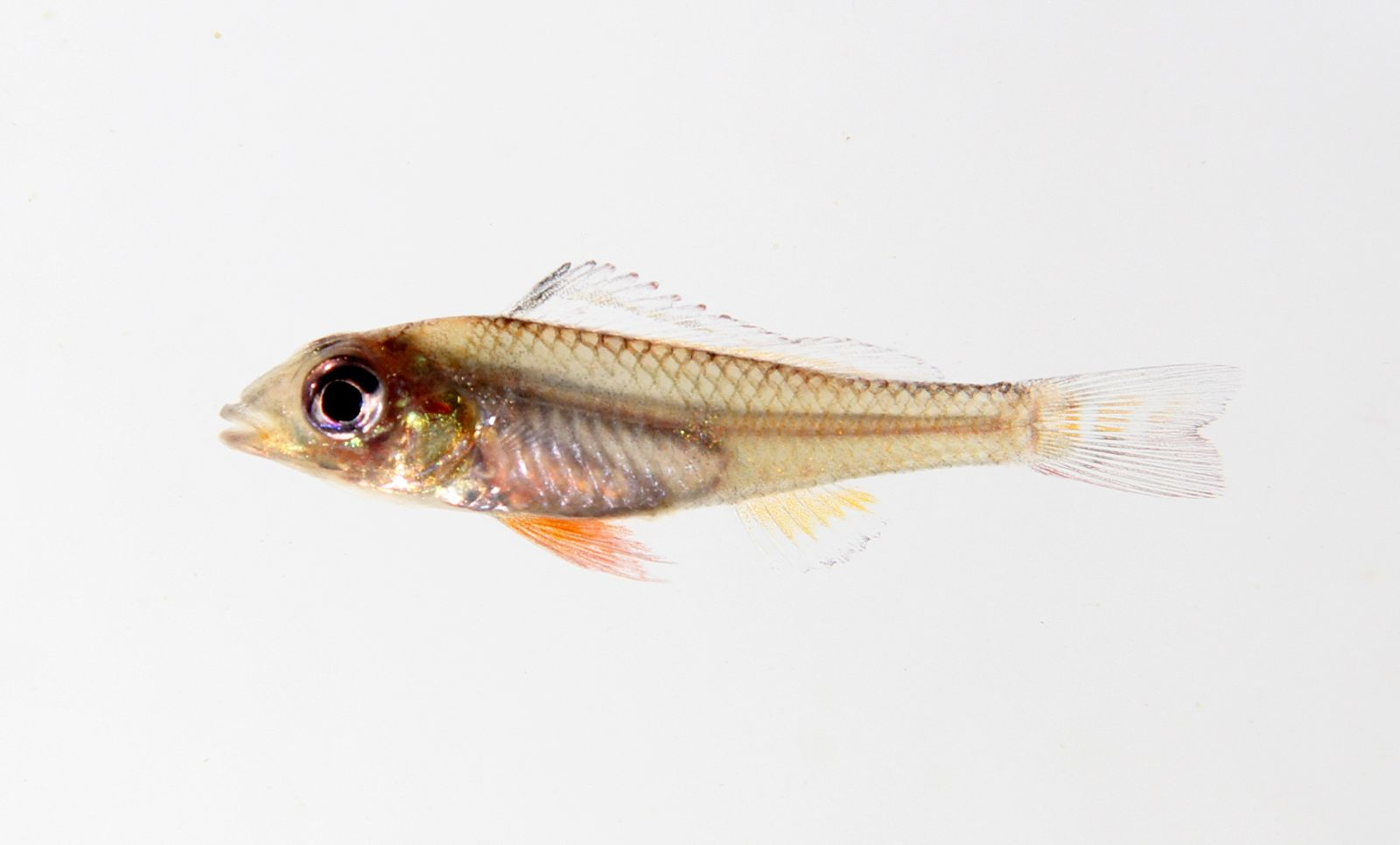
- B. opercularis

Scientific classification
- Kingdom: Animalia
- Phylum: Chordata
- Class: Actinopterygii
- Order: Cichliformes
- Family: Cichlidae
- Subfamily: Cichlinae
- Tribe: Geophagini
- Subtribe: Crenicaratina
- Genus: Biotoecus; C. H. Eigenmann & C. H. Kennedy, 1903

Type species
- Saraca opercularis Steindachner, 1875

= Biotoecus =

Genus of fishes

Biotoecus is a fish genus of cichlids from northern South America where one species (B. dicentrarchus) is found in the Orinoco Basin and the other (B. opercularis) occurs in the northern part of the Amazon Basin. These small cichlids do not surpass 10 cm (3.9 in) in length.

== Species ==
The two recognized species in this genus are:

- Biotoecus dicentrarchus S. O. Kullander, 1989
- Biotoecus opercularis (Steindachner, 1875)
