= Mikrogeophagus maculicauda =

Scientific classification
- Kingdom: Animalia
- Phylum: Chordata
- Class: Actinopterygii
- Order: Cichliformes
- Family: Cichlidae
- Genus: Mikrogeophagus
- Species: M. maculicauda

Binomial name
- Mikrogeophagus maculicauda Staeck, Ottoni & I. Schindler, 2022

Species of fish

Mikrogeophagus maculicaude, the Brazilian ram, is a species of Mikrogeophagus described in 2022.

It was first collected in 1993, and until its formal description was commonly referred to as Mikrogeophagus sp. "Zweifleck" (translated variously as "Two-patch", "Twin Spot", etc.)

The species is found in the Pindaituba River (a tributary of the Sararé River, itself part of the upper Guaporé River basin) in Mato Grosso, Brazil.

== Description ==
Average standard length is 5.5 centimetres (2.2 in), while its long filamentous caudal fin extensions bring its average total length to 8.1 centimetres (3.2 in)

== In the aquarium ==
The species has been seen for sale at online retail fish stores, albeit rarely.

== See also ==
- List of freshwater aquarium fish
