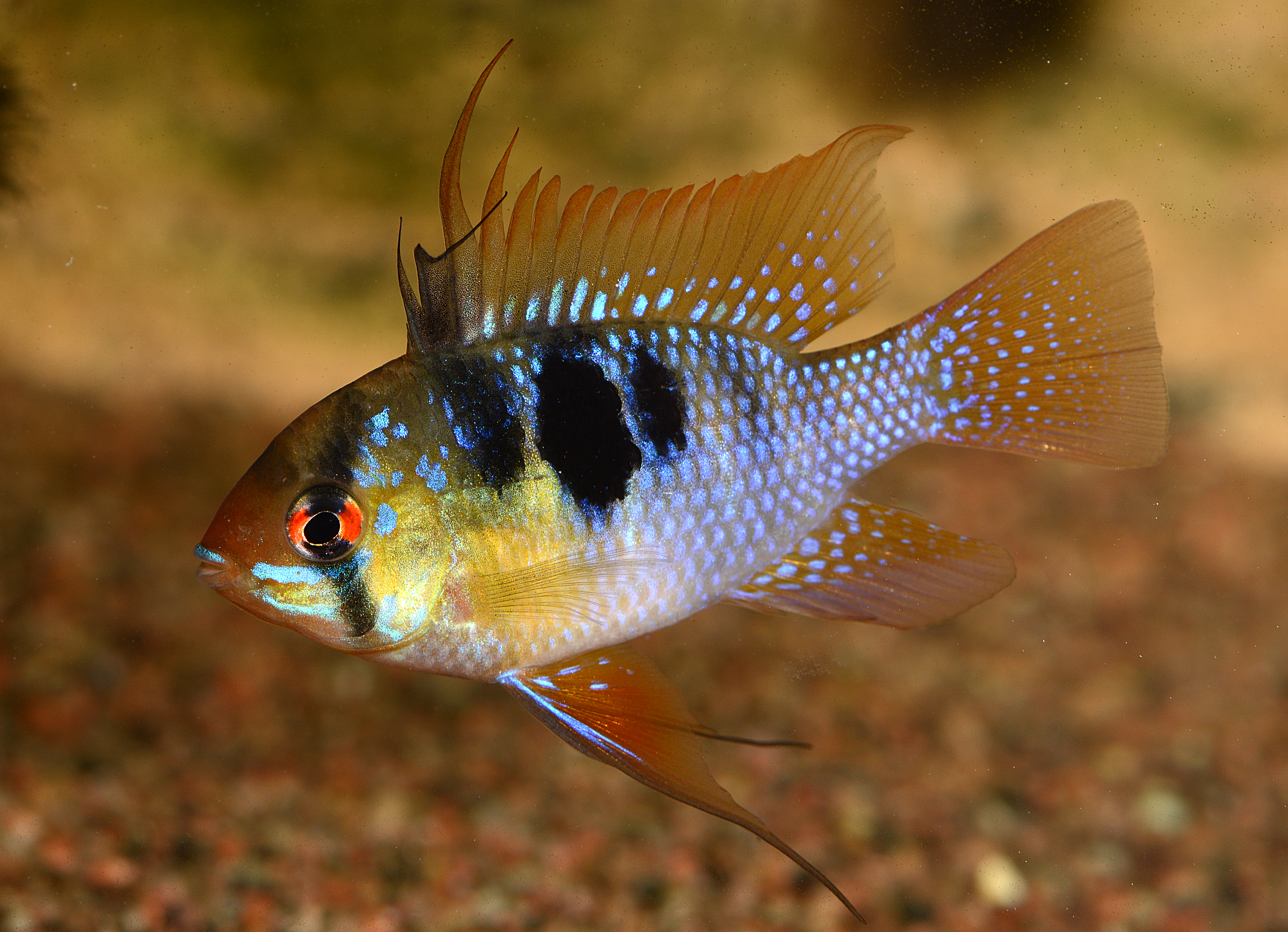
- Male ("German Blue" morph)
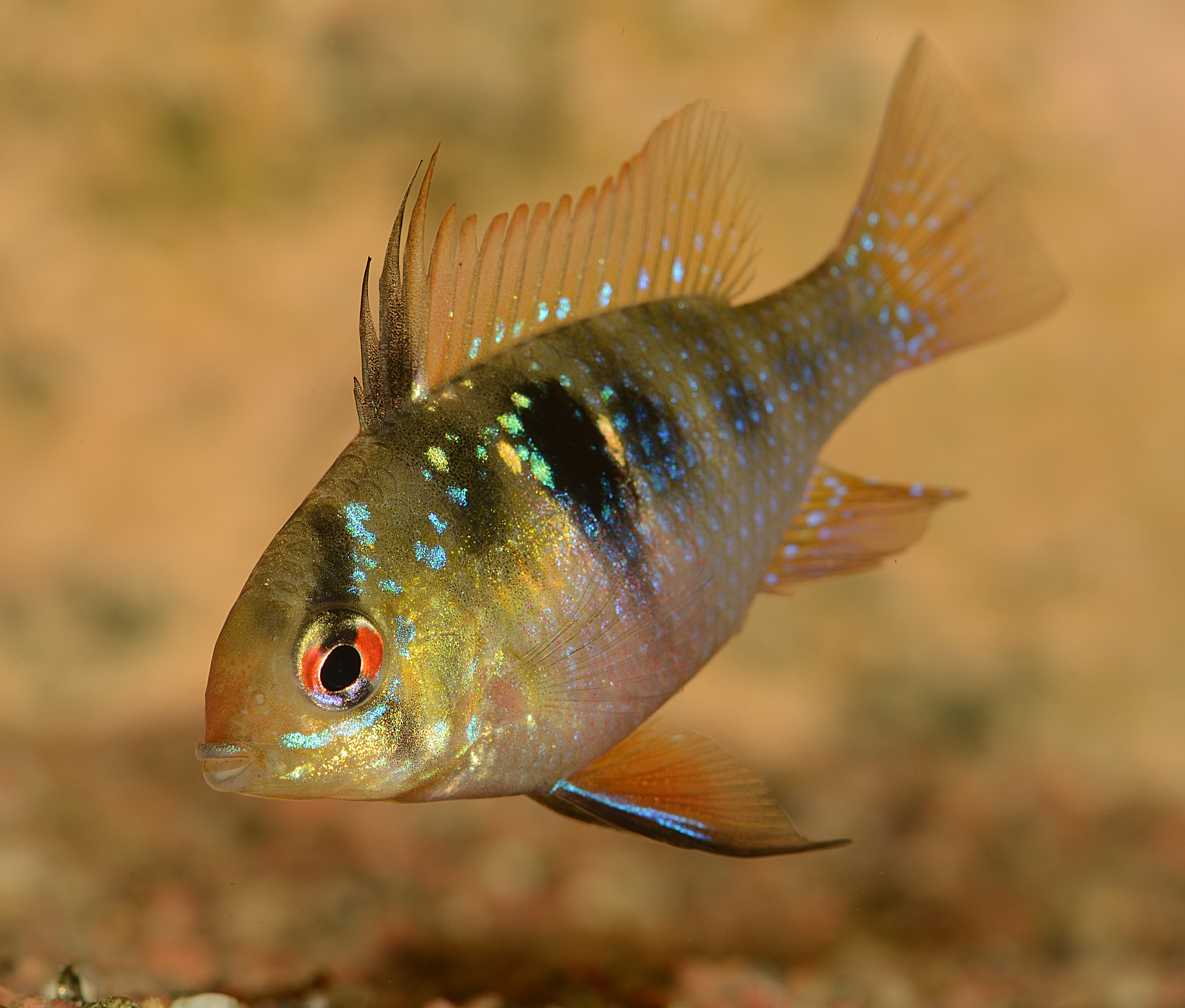
- Female ("German Blue" morph)

Conservation status
- Least Concern (IUCN 3.1)

Scientific classification
- Kingdom: Animalia
- Phylum: Chordata
- Class: Actinopterygii
- Order: Cichliformes
- Family: Cichlidae
- Genus: Mikrogeophagus
- Species: M. ramirezi

Binomial name
- Mikrogeophagus ramirezi (G. S. Myers & Harry, 1948)

Synonyms
- Apistogramma ramirezi G. S. Myers & Harry 1948; Microgeophagus ramirezi (G. S. Myers & Harry 1948); Papiliochromis ramirezi (G. S. Myers & Harry 1948); Papilochromis ramirezi (G. S. Myers & Harry 1948)

= Ram cichlid =

Species of fish

The ram cichlid (Mikrogeophagus ramirezi) is a species of freshwater fish endemic to the Orinoco River basin, in the savannahs of Venezuela and Colombia in South America. The species has been examined in studies on fish behaviour and is a popular aquarium fish, traded under a variety of common names, including ram, blue ram, German blue ram, Asian ram, butterfly cichlid, Ramirez's dwarf cichlid, dwarf butterfly cichlid and Ramirezi. The species is a member of the family Cichlidae and subfamily Geophaginae.

== Description ==
Male specimens of the ram usually have the first few rays of the dorsal fin extended, but breeding has made some females also show this. When close to spawning, female rams have a pink or red blush on the abdomen. Females also have a blue sheen over the spot just below the dorsal fin, or a sparse scattering of blue scales in the upper half of the dark spot, and males do not show this. Males are slightly larger than females, with this species reaching 34–40 mm (1.3–1.6 in).

== Distribution and habitat ==
The natural habitat of M. ramirezi are warm (25.5–29.5 °C (77.9–85.1 °F)), acidic (pH 5.2-6.7) water courses in the Llanos savannas of Venezuela and Colombia. The water is generally slow-flowing, contains few dissolved minerals, and ranges in colour from clear to darkly stained with tannins. The species is typically found where cover in the form of aquatic or submersed vegetation is available.

== Reproduction ==
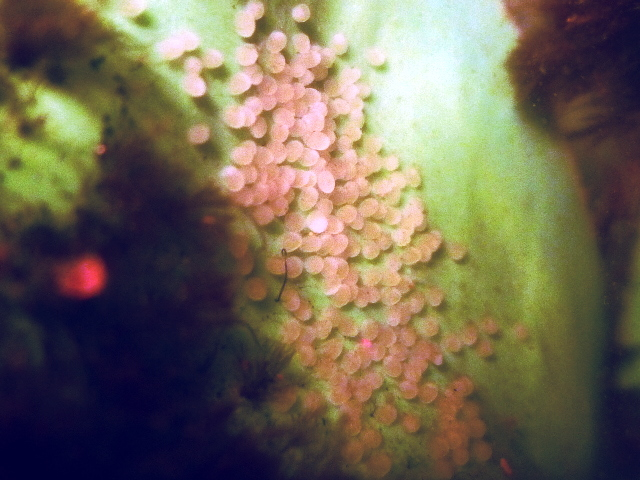
Closeup of unfertilized blue ram eggs

Once sexually mature, the fish form monogamous pairs prior to spawning, and the males do not tolerate other males. The species is known to lay its small 0.9 - 1.5 mm, adhesive eggs on flattened stones or directly into small depressions dug in the gravel. Like many cichlids, M. ramirezi practices biparental brood care, with both the male and the female playing roles in egg-tending and territorial defense. Typical clutch size for the species is 150–300 eggs, though clutches up to 500 have been reported. Parental ram cichlids have been observed to fan water over their eggs, which hatch in 40 hours at 29 °C (84 °F). The larvae are not free-swimming for five days, after which they are escorted by the male or the female in a dense school for foraging.

== Taxonomy, collection, and etymology ==
The ram cichlid is named after Manuel Ramirez, an early collector and importer of the species for the aquarium trade. George S. Myers and R. R. Harry (1948) originally described the species as Apistogramma ramirezi, though the species was later moved to and from various genera, including: Microgeophagus, Papiliochromis, Pseudoapistogramma, and Pseudogeophagus.

== In the aquarium ==
The ram cichlid is popular in the tropical freshwater community aquarium. While some larger cichlids are not well suited for a community tank, if a male and female pair of this specific type are placed in a community tank, they can do well.

=== Varieties ===
Numerous color morphs of M. ramirezi have been developed in Asia for the fishkeeping hobby. These include numerous xanthic morphs, known as gold rams or electric blue, along with larger, high-bodied, fattened "balloon" forms, and long-finned varieties. Many of these varieties suffer from lower fertility, health problems, or reduced brood care in comparison to wild-type specimens.

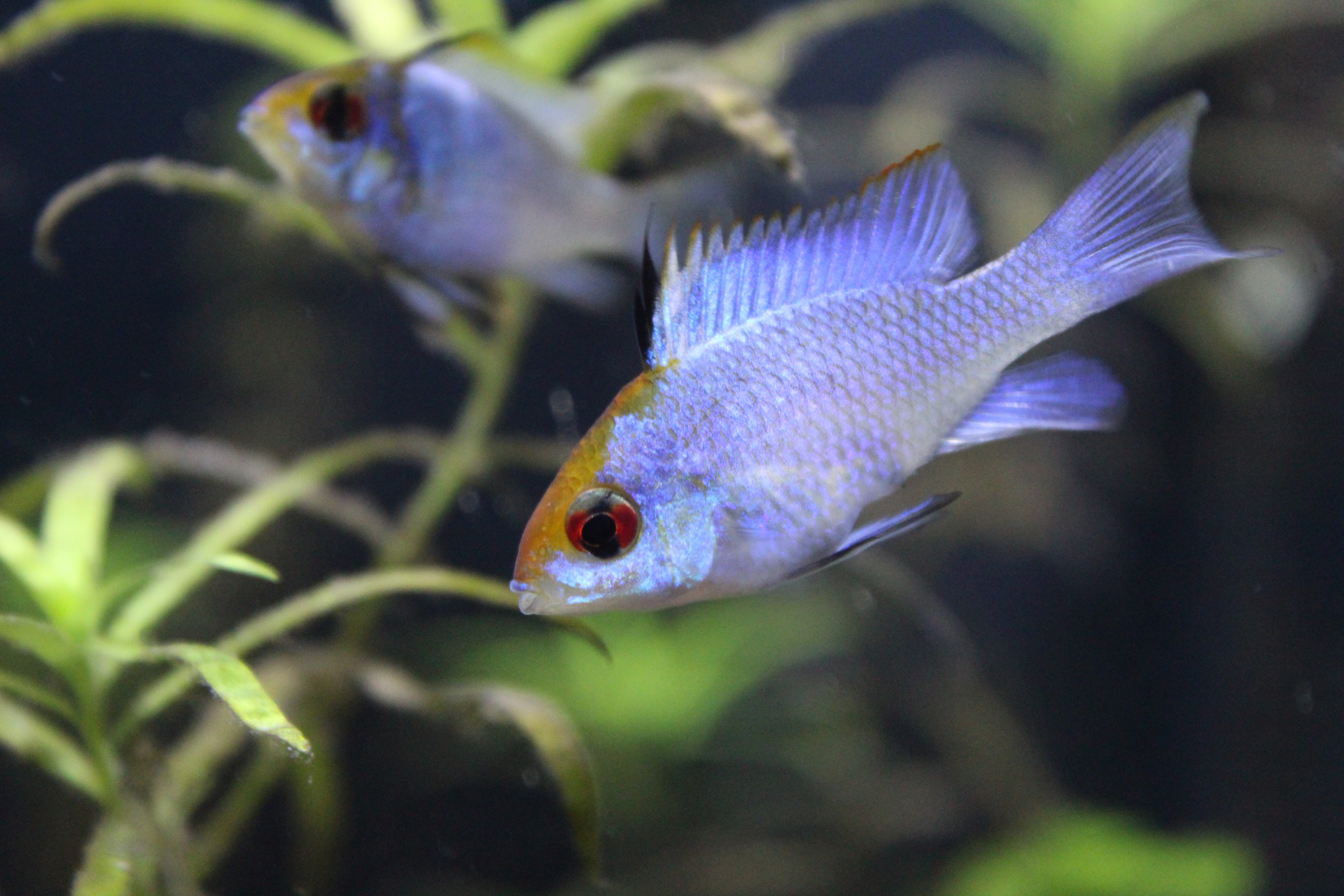
Electric Blue "Goldface" morph

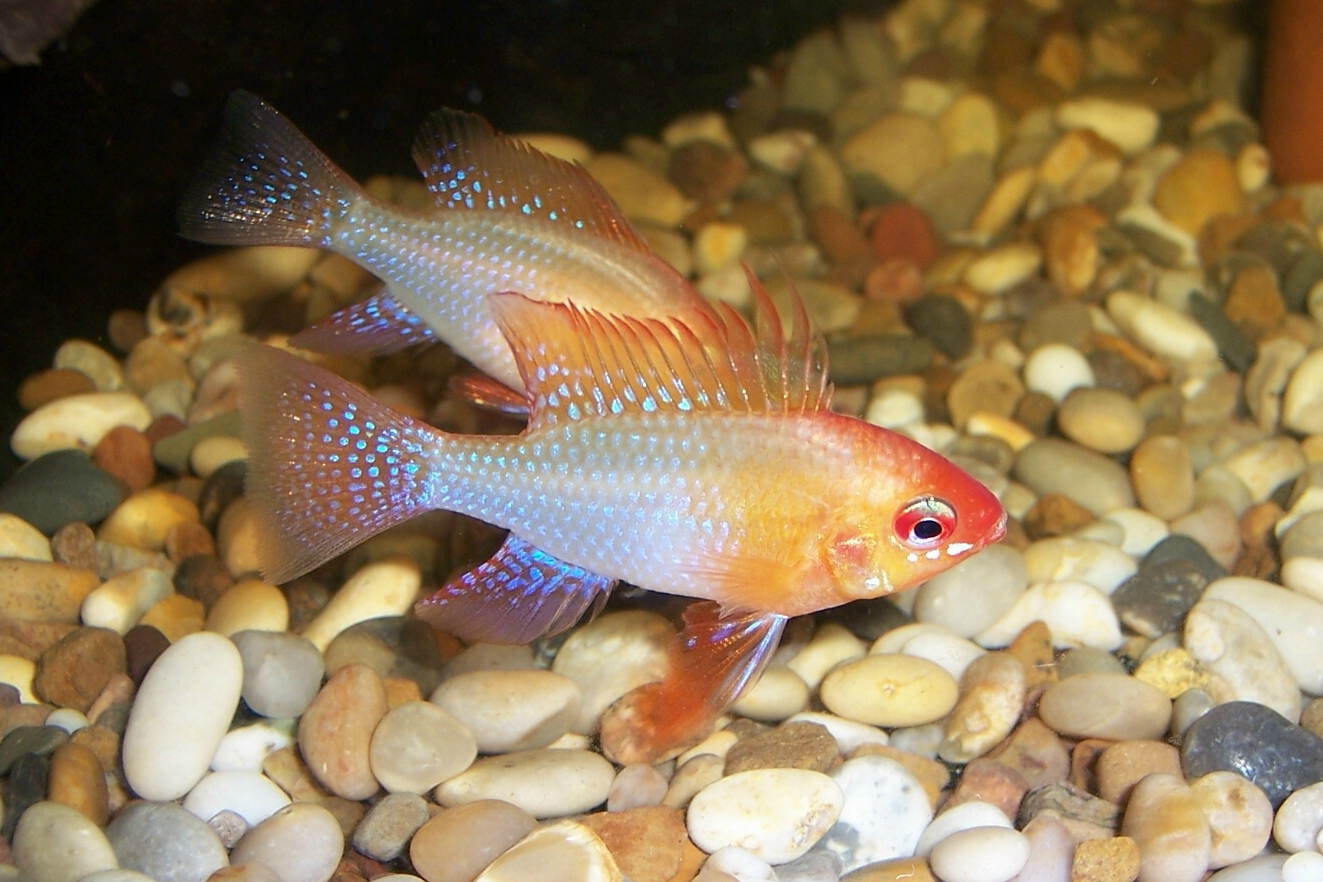
"German Gold" morph

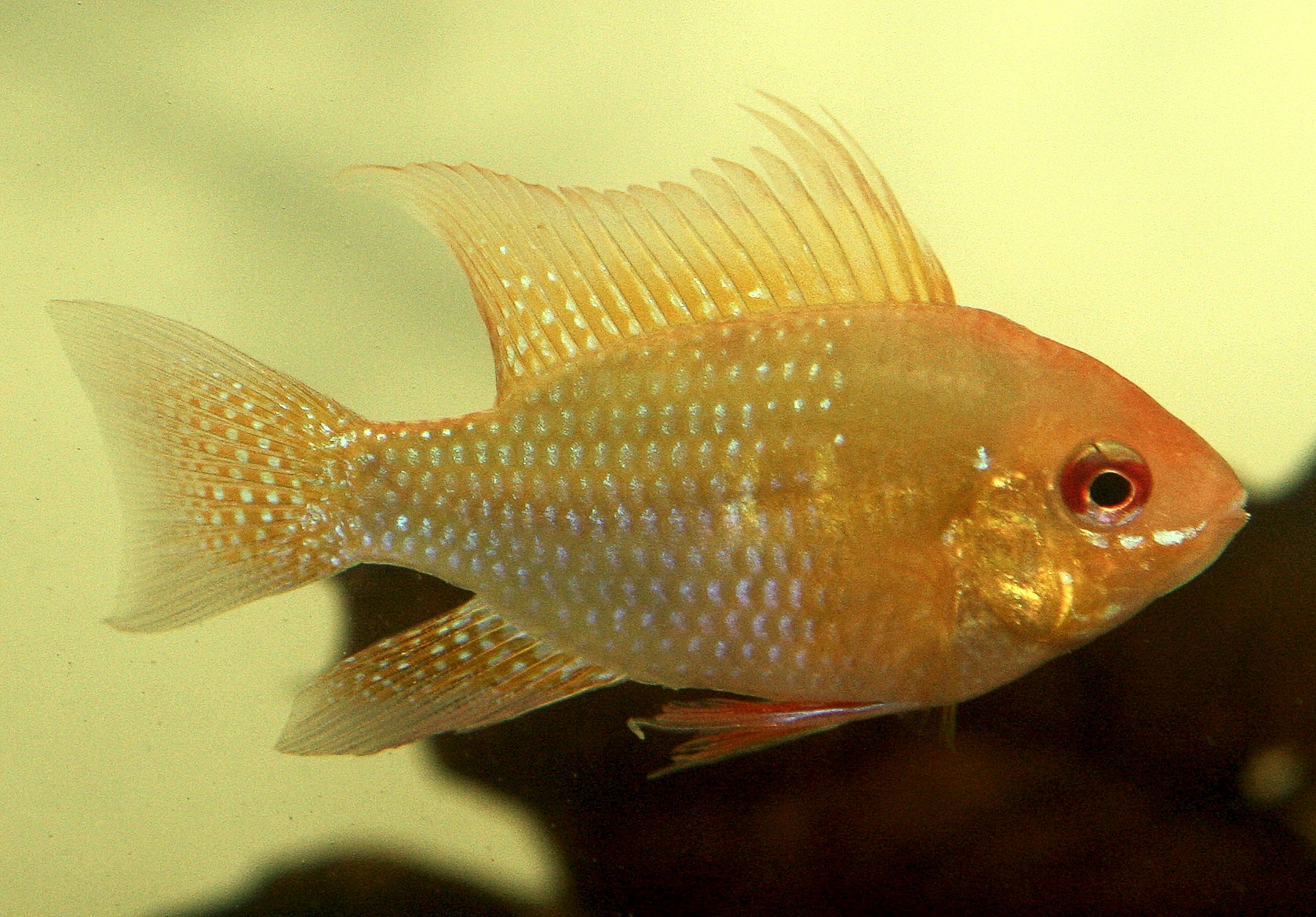
Xanthic morph

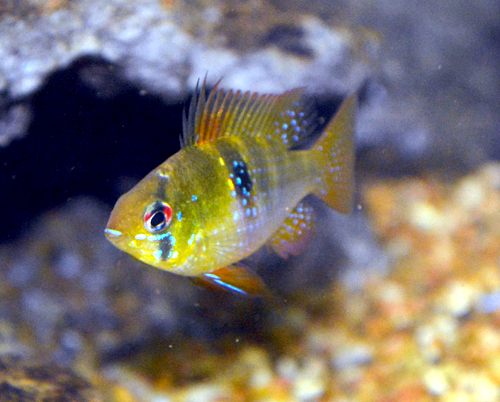
Wild-type (Colombian)

== See also ==
- List of freshwater aquarium fish species
