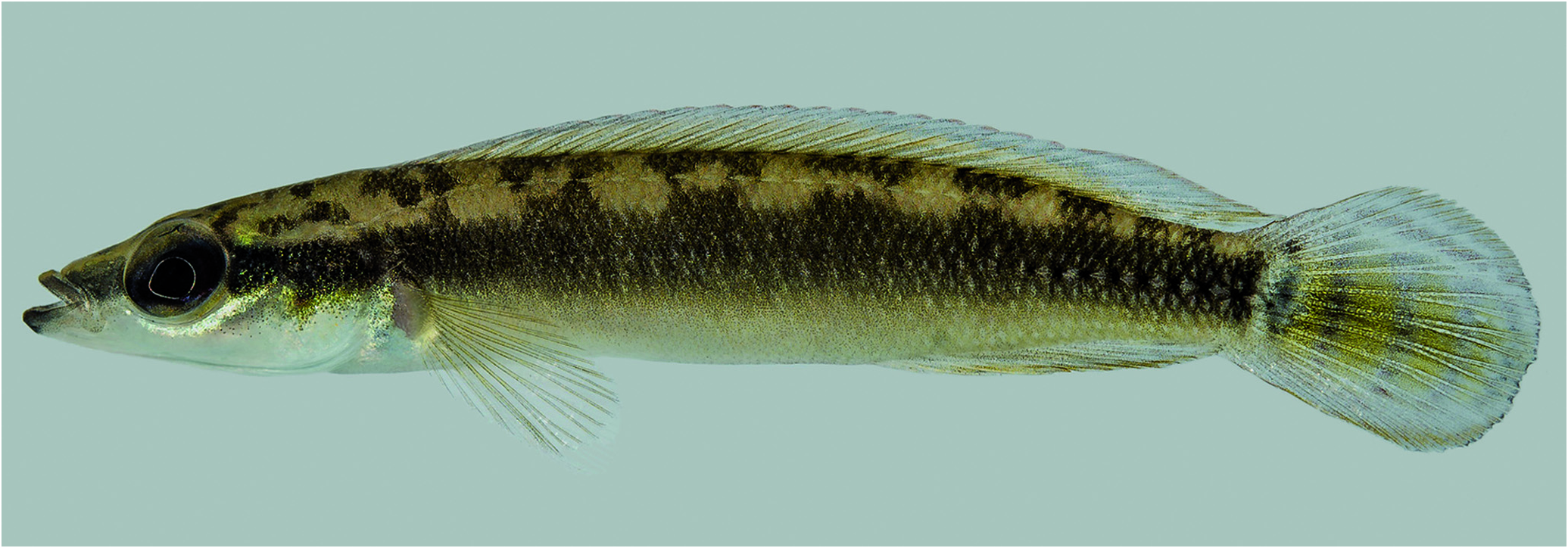

Scientific classification
- Kingdom: Animalia
- Phylum: Chordata
- Class: Actinopterygii
- Order: Cichliformes
- Family: Cichlidae
- Genus: Wallaciia
- Species: W. anamiri

Binomial name
- Wallaciia anamiri P. M. M. Ito & Rapp Py-Daniel, 2015

Synonyms
- Crenicichla anamiri

= Wallaciia anamiri =

Species of fish

Wallaciia anamiri is a species of cichlid native to South America. It is found swimming in the Middle rio Xingu and rio Bacajá, upstream of Volta Grande do Xingu in Brazil. This species reaches a length of 4.8 cm (1.9 in).
