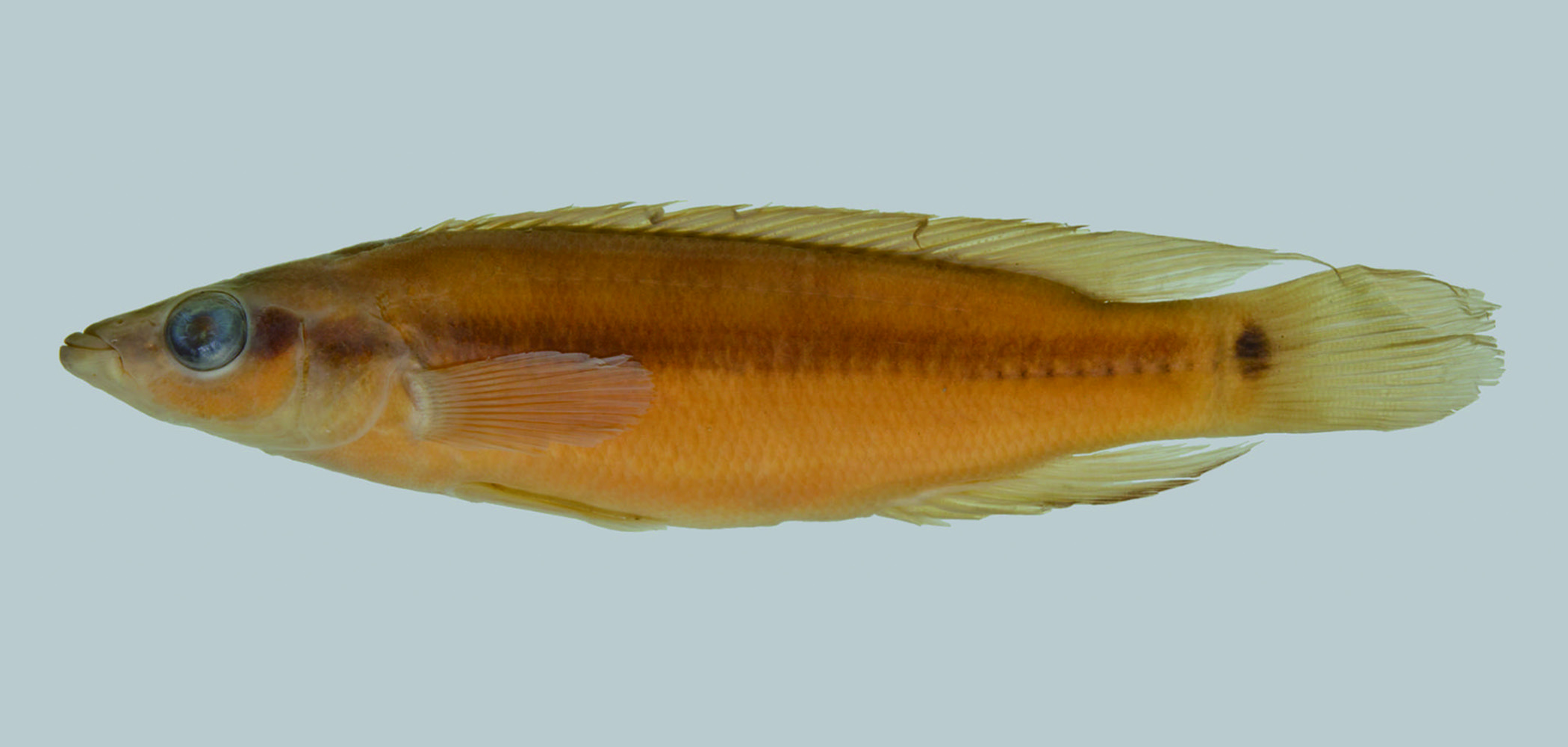
- Preserved specimen

Conservation status
- Data Deficient (IUCN 3.1)

Scientific classification
- Kingdom: Animalia
- Phylum: Chordata
- Class: Actinopterygii
- Order: Cichliformes
- Family: Cichlidae
- Genus: Wallaciia
- Species: W. virgatula

Binomial name
- Wallaciia virgatula Ploeg, 1991

Synonyms
- Crenicichla virgatula

= Wallaciia virgatula =

Species of fish

Wallaciia virgatula is a species of cichlid native to South America. It is found in the Amazon River basin and in the upper Branco River basin. This species reaches a length of 6.6 cm (2.6 in).
