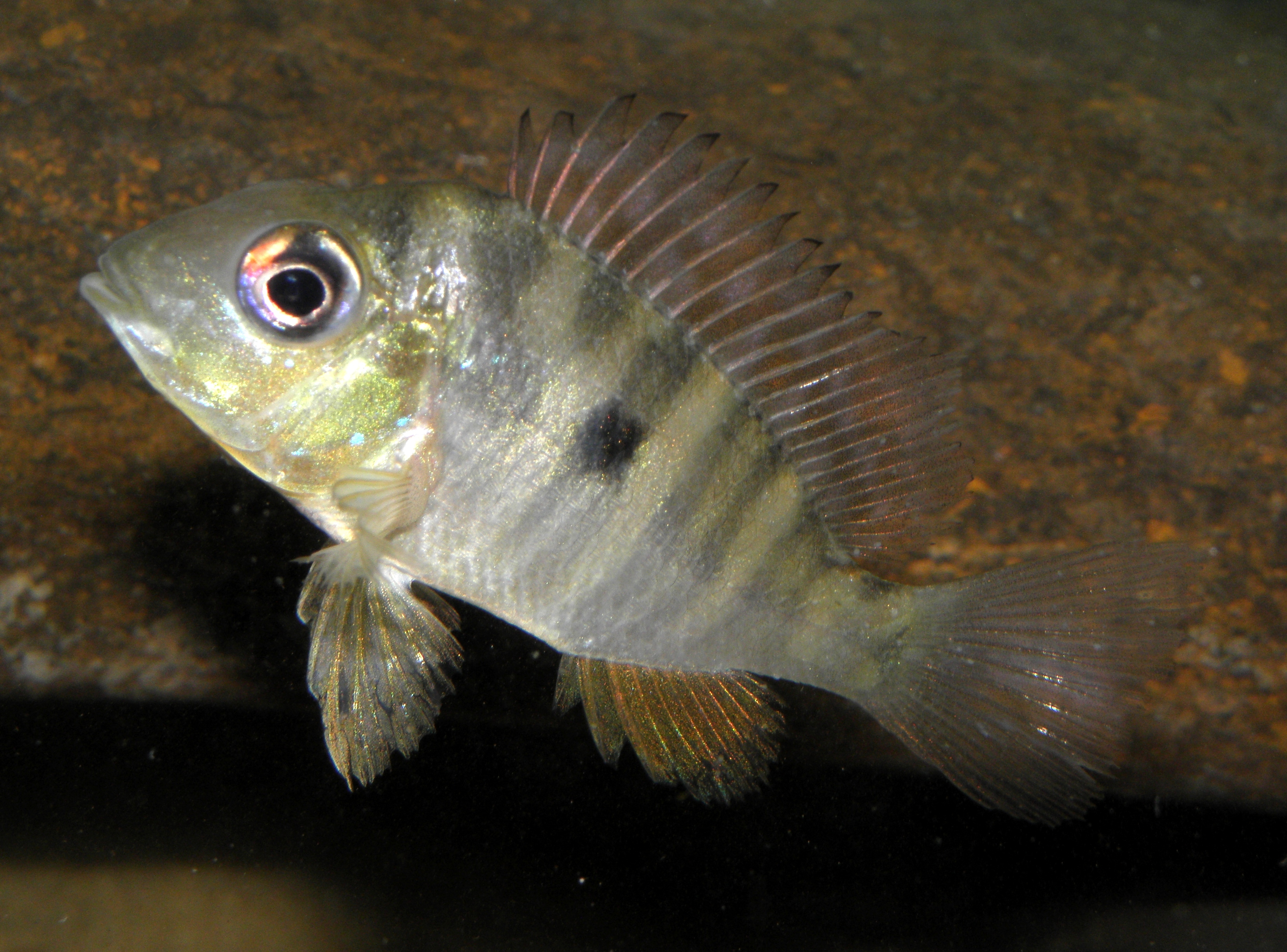
- Gymnogeophagus balzanii

Scientific classification
- Kingdom: Animalia
- Phylum: Chordata
- Class: Actinopterygii
- Order: Cichliformes
- Family: Cichlidae
- Subfamily: Cichlinae
- Tribe: Geophagini
- Subtribe: Geophagina
- Genus: Gymnogeophagus; A. Miranda-Ribeiro, 1918

Type species
- Gymnogeophagus cyanopterus A. Miranda-Ribeiro, 1918
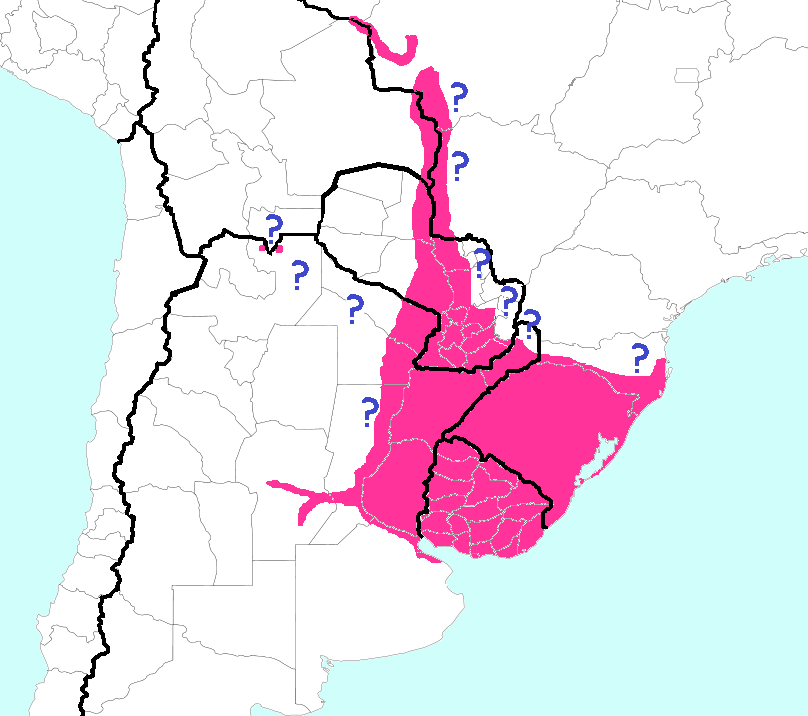
- Geographic range of genus Gymnogeophagus

= Gymnogeophagus =

Gymnogeophagus Temporal range: 48.6–0 Ma

Genus of fishes

Gymnogeophagus is a genus of cichlid fishes from South America, where they are known from various river basins (notably Rio de la Plata and Lagoa dos Patos–Mirim) in southern Brazil, Paraguay, Uruguay and northern Argentina. They are part of a group popularly known as eartheaters.

== Species ==
There are currently 20 recognized extant species in this genus:

- Gymnogeophagus australis (C. H. Eigenmann, 1907) (Uruguayan eartheater)
- Gymnogeophagus balzanii (Perugia, 1891) (Argentine eartheater)
- Gymnogeophagus caaguazuensis Staeck, 2006
- Gymnogeophagus che Casciotta, S. E. Gómez & Toresanni, 2000
- Gymnogeophagus constellatus L. R. Malabarba, M. C. Malabarba & R. E. dos Reis, 2015
- Gymnogeophagus gymnogenys (R. F. Hensel, 1870) (Smooth-cheek eartheater)
- Gymnogeophagus jaryi Alonso et al., 2019
- Gymnogeophagus labiatus (R. F. Hensel, 1870) (Earth eater)
- Gymnogeophagus lacustris R. E. dos Reis & L. R. Malabarba, 1988
- Gymnogeophagus lipokarenos L. R. Malabarba, M. C. Malabarba & R. E. dos Reis, 2015
- Gymnogeophagus mekinos L. R. Malabarba, M. C. Malabarba & R. E. dos Reis, 2015
- Gymnogeophagus meridionalis R. E. dos Reis & L. R. Malabarba, 1988
- Gymnogeophagus missioneiro L. R. Malabarba, M. C. Malabarba & R. E. dos Reis, 2015
- Gymnogeophagus peliochelynion Turcati, Serra-Alanis & Malabarba, 2018
- Gymnogeophagus pseudolabiatus L. R. Malabarba, M. C. Malabarba & R. E. dos Reis, 2015
- Gymnogeophagus rhabdotus (R. F. Hensel, 1870) (Stripe-fin eartheater)
- Gymnogeophagus setequedas R. E. dos Reis, L. R. Malabarba & Pavanelli, 1992
- Gymnogeophagus taroba Casciotta, Almirón, Piálek & Říčan, 2017
- Gymnogeophagus terrapurpura Loureiro, Zarucki, L. R. Malabarba & González-Bergonzoni, 2016
- Gymnogeophagus tiraparae González-Bergonzoni, Loureiro & Oviedo, 2009

An extinct species Gymnogeophagus eocenicus lived during the Early Eocene of Argentina, around 48.6 million years ago, representing one of the oldest known cichlids.
