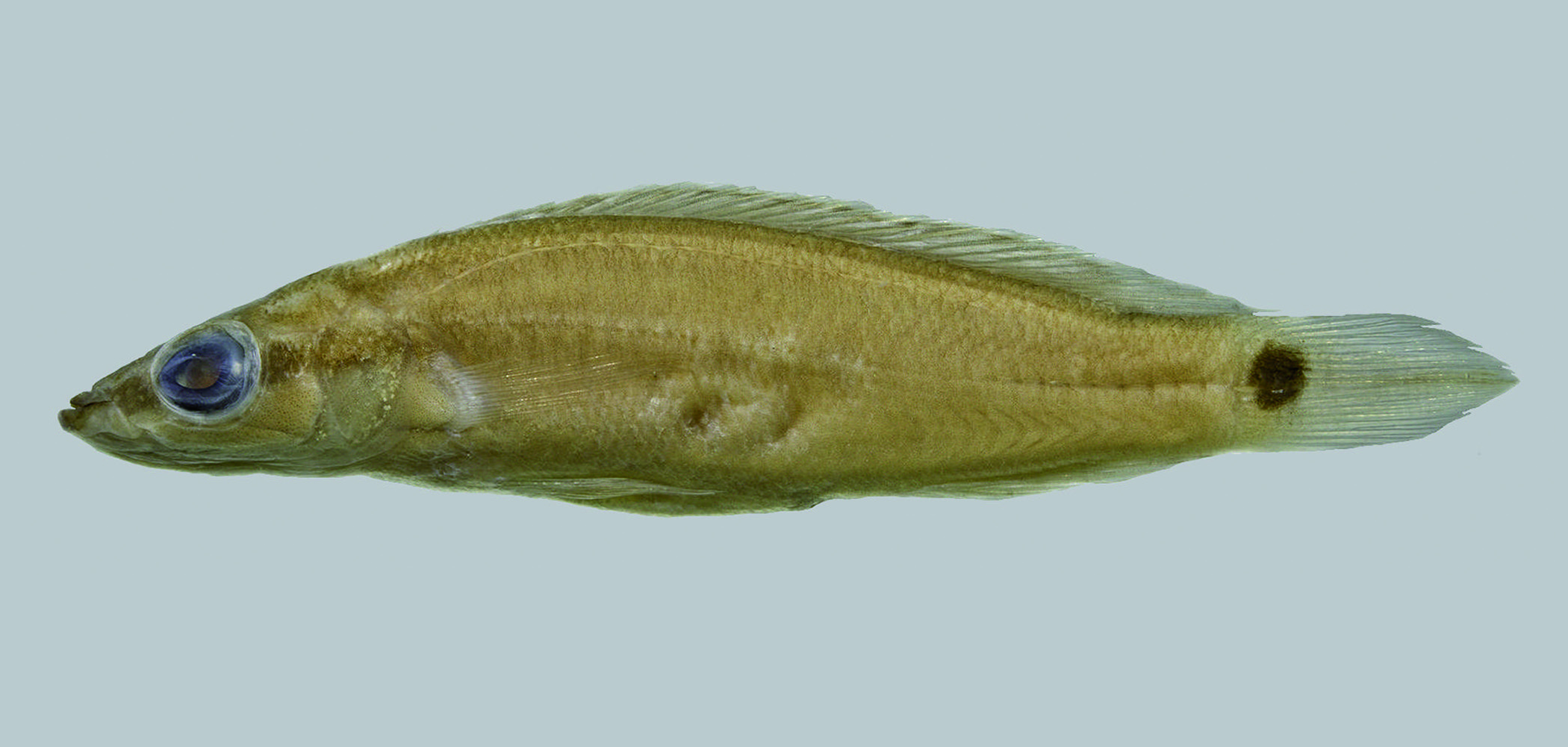
- Preserved specimen

Conservation status
- Endangered (IUCN 3.1)

Scientific classification
- Kingdom: Animalia
- Phylum: Chordata
- Class: Actinopterygii
- Order: Cichliformes
- Family: Cichlidae
- Genus: Wallaciia
- Species: W. urosema

Binomial name
- Wallaciia urosema (S. O. Kullander, 1990)

Synonyms
- Crenicichla urosema

= Wallaciia urosema =

Species of fish

Wallaciia urosema is a species of cichlid native to South America. It is found in the Amazon River basin, in the Tapajós River at São Luiz, Brazil. This species reaches a length of 6.9 cm (2.7 in).
