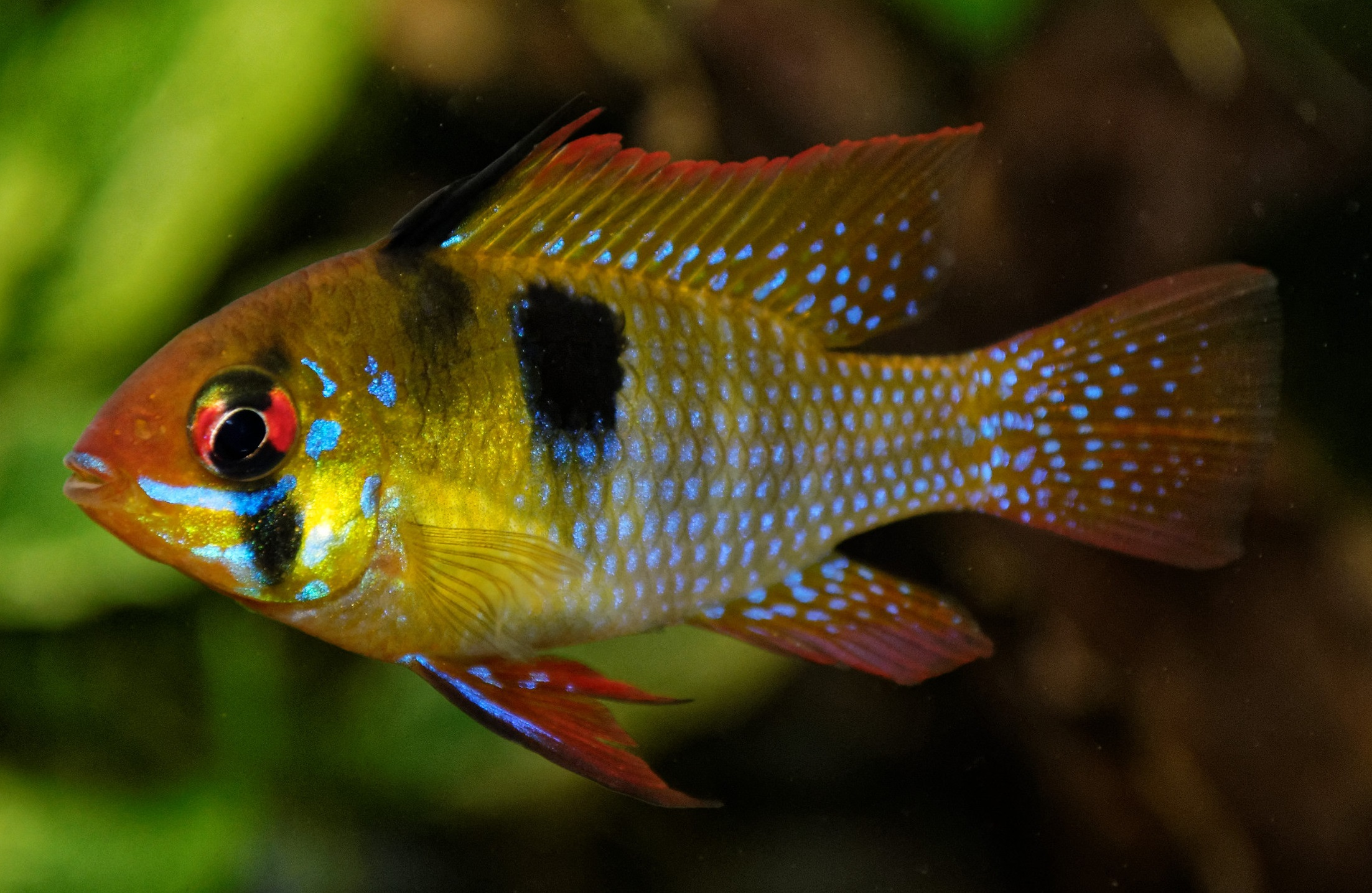
- Ram cichlid (M. ramirezi)
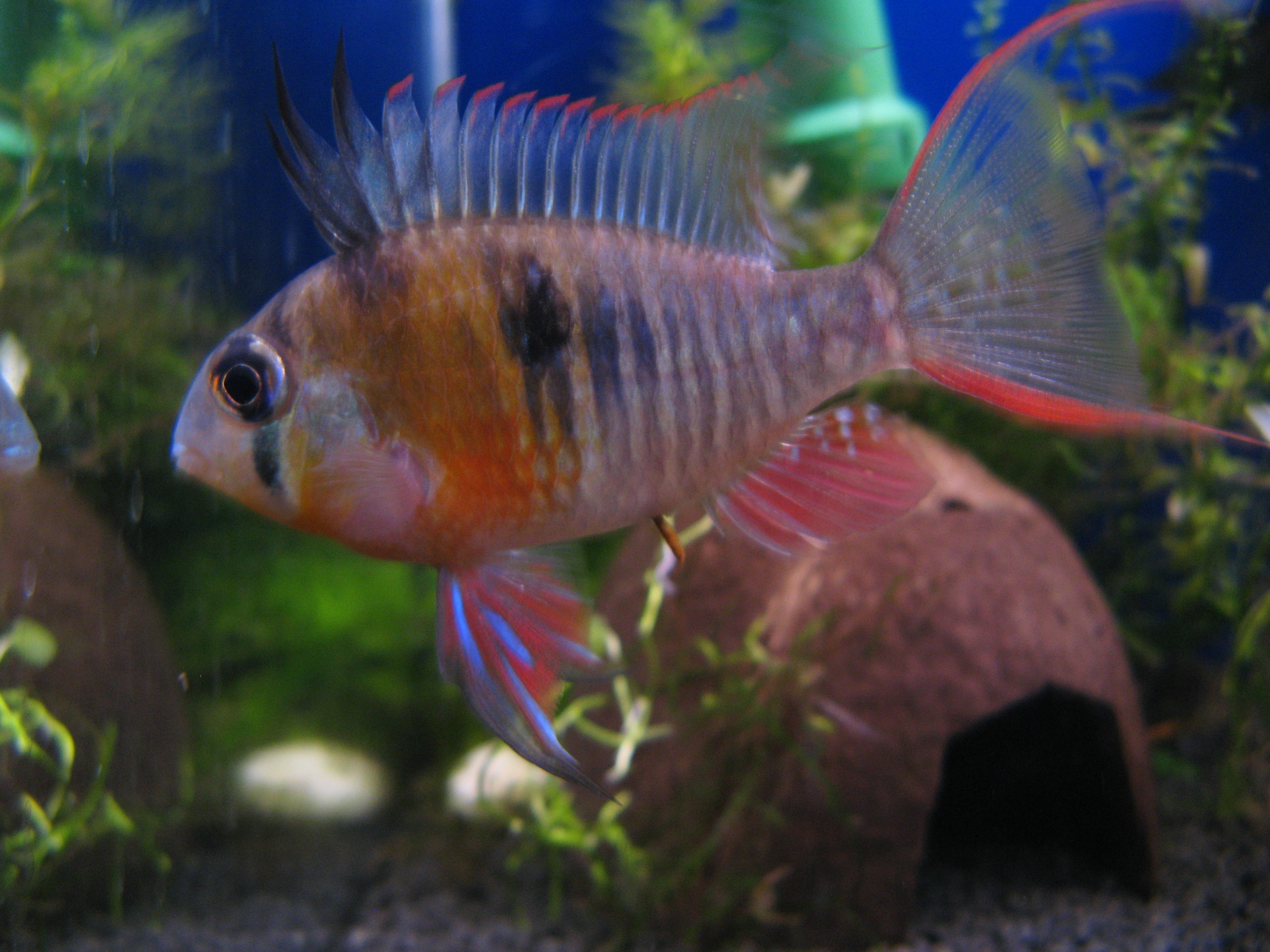
- Bolivian ram (M. altispinosus)

Scientific classification
- Kingdom: Animalia
- Phylum: Chordata
- Class: Actinopterygii
- Order: Cichliformes
- Family: Cichlidae
- Subfamily: Cichlinae
- Tribe: Geophagini
- Genus: Mikrogeophagus; Meulengracht-Madsen, 1968

Type species
- Apistogramma ramirezi G. S. Myers & Harry, 1948

Synonyms
- Microgeophagus Frey, 1957 (not available); Microgeophagus Axelrod 1971; Papiliochromis Kullander 1977

= Mikrogeophagus =

Genus of fishes

Mikrogeophagus is a genus of cichlids native to the Llanos wetlands (Orinoco basin) and Guaporé–Mamoré river system (southern Amazon basin) in tropical South America. They are dwarf cichlids that reach up to 6 cm (2.4 in) in standard length.

They are popular with aquarists, especially M. ramirezi. These species spawn on flat rocks or leaves and not in small caves like the closely related cichlid genus Apistogramma.

== Species ==
The currently recognized species in this genus are:

- Mikrogeophagus altispinosus (Haseman, 1911) (Bolivian ram)
- Mikrogeophagus maculicauda Staeck, Ottoni & I. Schindler, 2022 (Brazilian ram)
- Mikrogeophagus ramirezi (G. S. Myers & Harry, 1948) (ram cichlid)
