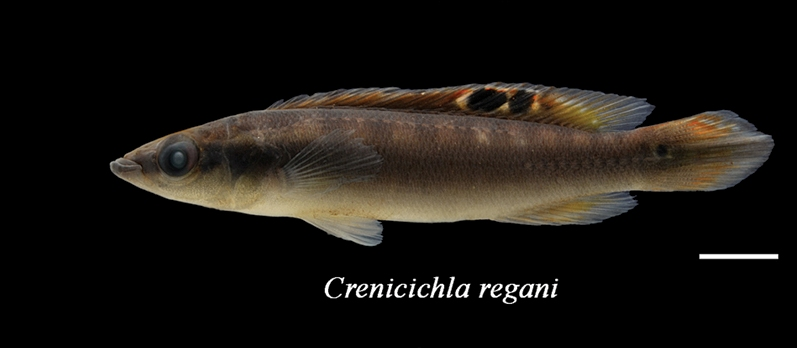

Conservation status
- Least Concern (IUCN 3.1)

Scientific classification
- Kingdom: Animalia
- Phylum: Chordata
- Class: Actinopterygii
- Order: Cichliformes
- Family: Cichlidae
- Genus: Wallaciia
- Species: W. regani

Binomial name
- Wallaciia regani Ploeg, 1989

Synonyms
- Crenicichla regani

= Wallaciia regani =

Species of fish

Wallaciia regani is a species of cichlid native to South America. It is found in the Amazon River basin and in the Trombetas River at Cachoeira Porteira, Brazil. This species reaches a length of 7.9 cm (3.1 in).

The fish is named in honour of Charles Tate Regan (1878–1943), of the Natural History Museum in London, who was the last ichthyologist to revise the genus Crenicichla, where this species was formerly placed, before Ploeg took on the task.
