= Wallaciia notophthalmus =

Conservation status
- Least Concern (IUCN 3.1)

Scientific classification
- Kingdom: Animalia
- Phylum: Chordata
- Class: Actinopterygii
- Order: Cichliformes
- Family: Cichlidae
- Genus: Wallaciia
- Species: W. notophthalmus

Binomial name
- Wallaciia notophthalmus Regan, 1913

Synonyms
- Crenicichla notophthalmus

Species of fish

Wallaciia notophthalmus is a species of cichlid native to South America. It is found in the Amazon River basin, in the lower Negro River basin. This species reaches a length of 7.6 cm (3.0 in).
