= Sararé River =

Location
- Country: Brazil

Physical characteristics
- Source
  - location: Mato Grosso state
- Mouth
  - coordinates: 14°52′S 59°59′W

The Sararé River is a river of Mato Grosso state in western Brazil. It is a tributary of the Guaporé River, itself a part of the Amazon Basin.

== See also ==
- List of rivers of Mato Grosso
