= Johann Jakob Heckel =

Austrian zoologist (1790–1857)

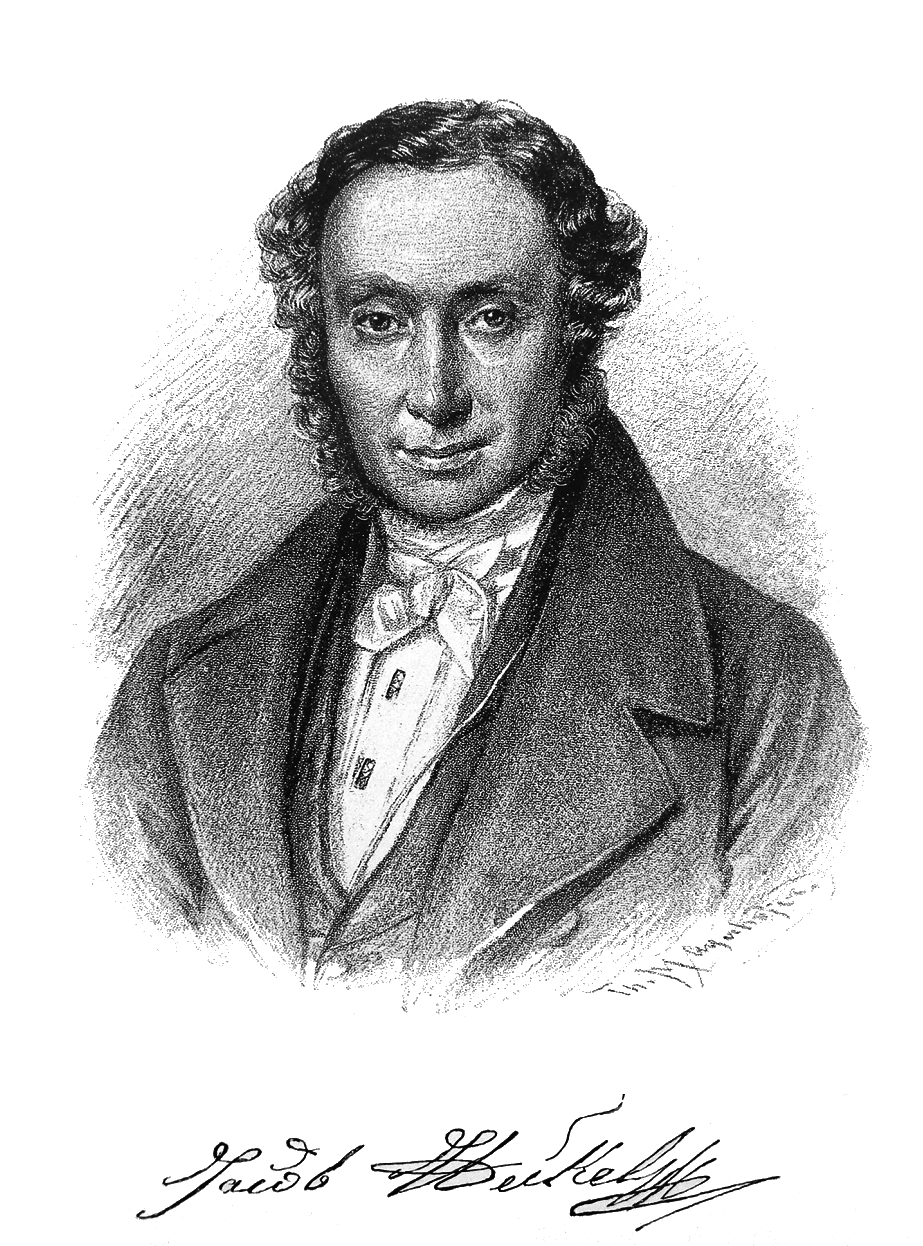
- Johann Jakob Heckel
- Born: 23 January 1790; Mannheim, Electoral Palatinate
- Died: 12 March 1857 (aged 67); Vienna, Austrian Empire
- Scientific career
- Fields: Ichthyology; Zoology
- Institutions: Naturhistorisches Museum

Johann Jakob Heckel (23 January 1790 – 1 March 1857) was an Austrian taxidermist, zoologist and ichthyologist. He worked at the Royal natural history cabinet in Vienna which later became the Austrian Museum of Natural History.

== Life ==
Heckel was born in Mannheim, the son of a namesake music teacher and Sophia née Reinhardt. He also had a namesake brother who studied music and was educated at home and lived in Vienna for a while. Another brother was Karl Ferdinand Heckel (1800-1870) who also studied music. In 1805, the family fled the French to Pressburg (now Bratislava, Slovakia) and then to Pest. Heckel visited the Georgicon agricultural college in 1806. His father bought a farm in Gumpoldskirchen and after the death of his father in December 1811, his mother took over the farm, assisted by his brother. He married Barbara Baumgartner in 1817 and in 1818 he was working at the Vienna Naturaliencabinet (which later became the Naturhistorisches Museum). He studied some botany after meeting Franz Edler von Portenschlag-Ledermayer (1772–1822). He was acquainted with both Joseph Natterer Sr. (1754–1823), as well as Joseph Natterer Jr. (1786–1852). In 1819-20 he went on collecting trip in southern Europe, collecting birds for Natterer as well as plants and other specimens. He met Eduard Rüppell (1794–1884) with whom he climbed Mount Etna. They planned to make a trip to Nubia but it never happened. Heckel developed instruments for measuring fish and some biographers have claimed that he worked briefly as a watchmaker. Though not a formally trained biologist, he worked his way up through the ranks and in 1832 he became an assistant curator. On 6 May 1835, he was given responsibility of the fish collection following the departure of Leopold Fitzinger. For the most part, he was not a traveler or explorer like many of the scientists of the time, he remained in Vienna, where he studied and catalogued specimens sent to him from the field. Among those who brought specimens to him were Karl Alexander Hügel, Joseph Russegger and Theodor Kotschy — involving collection activities in Kashmir, the Middle East and northeastern Africa that greatly enriched the Vienna museum. Fish were his specialty and he worked with many of the greatest ichthyologists of his time including Cuvier, Valenciennes, Bonaparte, Müller, and Troschel.

In the fields of systematics and taxonomy, he made significant contributions in his investigations of cyprinids. He wrote more than 60 works, the most notable of which is "The freshwater fishes of the Austrian Danubian monarchy". He worked on it for more than 24 years but died before its final publication, most likely from bacteria he was exposed to while getting a skeleton from a dead sperm whale.

== Works ==
- Cyprinen, Scaphirhynchus und andere ichthyologica (1836–1840), with Johann Natterer — Cyprinidae, Scaphirhynchus and other ichthyologica.
- Fische aus Caschmir, (1838), with Karl Alexander Hügel — Fish of Kashmir.
- Die Süßwasserfische der österreichischen Monarchie, mit Rücksicht auf die angränzenden Länder bearbeitet (with 204 woodcuts) - The freshwater fishes of the Austrian monarchy, processed with regard to adjacent countries, with Rudolf Kner (1858).
- Beiträge zur kenntniss der fossilen fische Österreichs, (1856) — Contribution to the knowledge of Austrian fossil fish.
- Neue Beiträge zur Kenntniss der fossilen Fische Österreichs, (1861), with Rudolf Kner — New contribution to the knowledge of Austrian fossil fish.

== Legacy ==
Fish named after him include:

- The cichlid Acarichthys heckelii (J. P. Müller & Troschel, 1849) was named in his honor.
- The Pike Cichlid Crenicichla heckeli Ploeg, 1989 was named in his honor.

== See also ==
- Category:Taxa named by Johann Jakob Heckel
