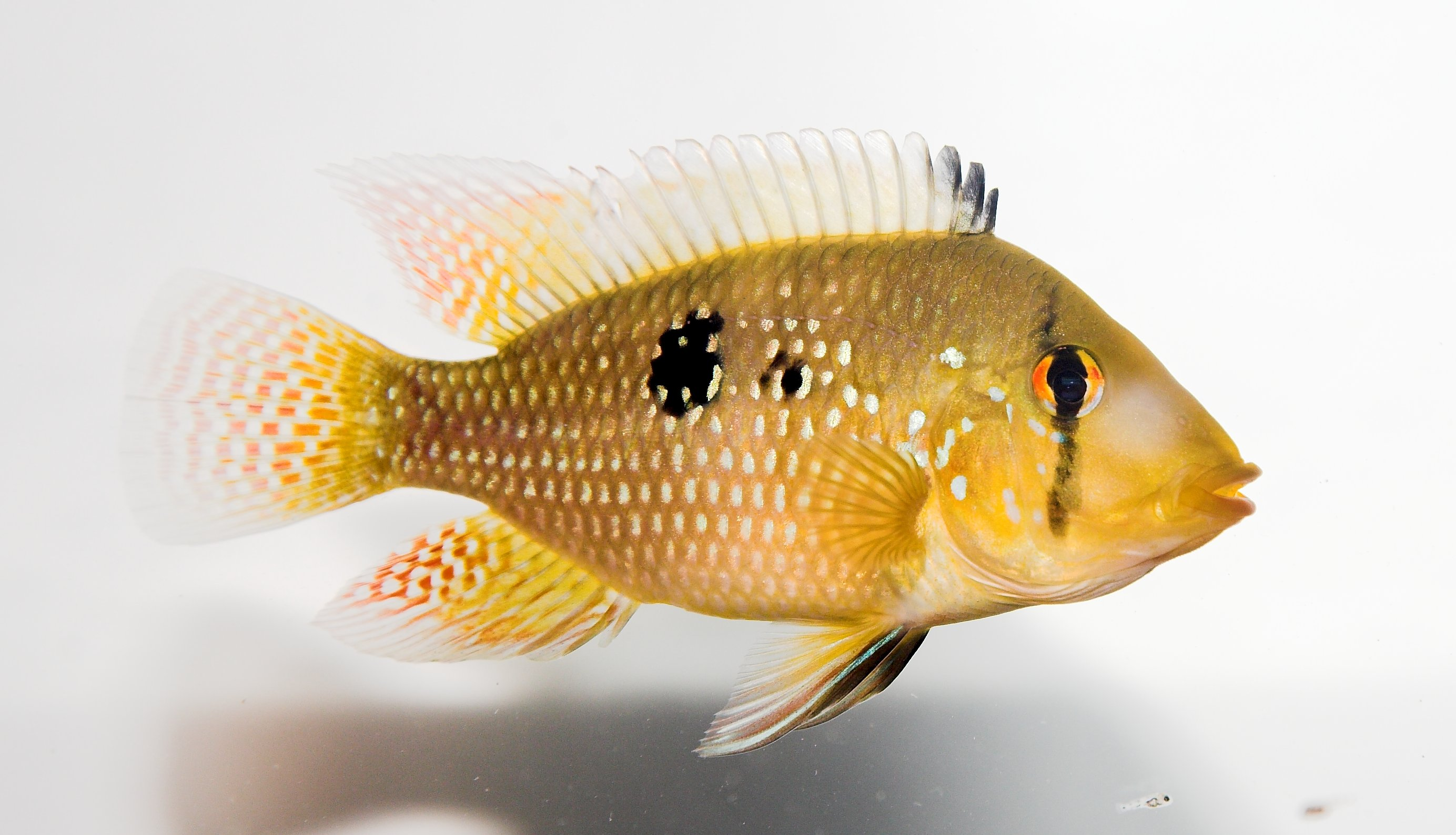
- Geophagus brasiliensis

Scientific classification
- Kingdom: Animalia
- Phylum: Chordata
- Class: Actinopterygii
- Division: Teleostei
- Order: Cichliformes
- Family: Cichlidae
- Subfamily: Cichlinae
- Tribe: Geophagini; Haseman, 1911

Type genus
- Geophagus Heckel, 1840

= Geophagini =

Geophagini Temporal range: 48.6–0 Ma

Tribe of fishes

Geophagini is a tribe of cichlids from the subfamily Cichlinae, the American cichlids. It is the sister taxon to the clade which includes the Cichlasomatini and Heroini. Fishes in the Geophagini are distributed from Panama south to Argentina, it is the most speciose of the seven tribes within the Cichlinae and it is subdivided into three sub-tribes, Acarichthyina, Crenicaratina, and Geophagina which together contain over 200 species. Geophagines show morphological and behavioural specialisations to enable them to sift the substrates within their mouths so that they can separate benthic invertebrates from substrates dominated by sand or silt.

== Classification ==
The Geophagini are classified as follows:

- Subtribe Acarichthyina Kullander, 1998
  - Genus Acarichthys C. H. Eigenmann, 1912
  - Genus Guianacara Kullander & Nijssen, 1989
- Subtribe Crenicaratina Kullander, 1998
  - Genus Biotoecus C. H. Eigenmann & C. H. Kennedy, 1903
  - Genus Crenicara Steindachner, 1875
  - Genus Crenicichla Heckel, 1840
    - Now split into Hemeraia, Lugubria, Saxatilia and Wallaciia
  - Genus Dicrossus Steindachner, 1875
  - Genus Teleocichla Kullander, 1988
- Subtribe Geophagina Haseman, 1911
  - Genus Apistogramma Regan, 1913
  - Genus Apistogrammoides Meinken, 1965
  - Genus Biotodoma C. H. Eigenmann & C. H. Kennedy, 1903
  - Genus Geophagus Heckel, 1840
  - Genus Gymnogeophagus Miranda-Ribeiro, 1918
  - Genus Mazarunia Kullander, 1990
  - Genus Mikrogeophagus Meulengracht-Madsen, 1968
  - Genus Satanoperca Günther, 1862
  - Genus Taeniacara G. S. Myers, 1935
