= Franz Steindachner =

Austrian zoologist, ichthyologist and herpetologist (1834–1919)

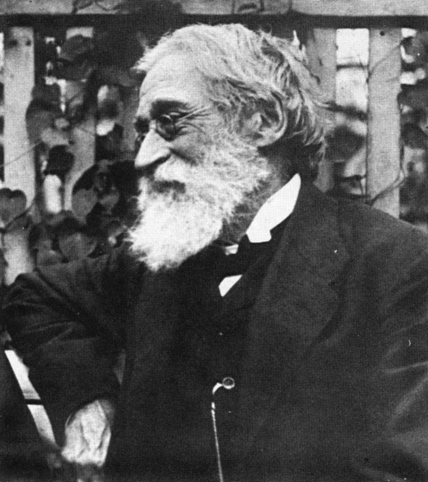
- Steindachner in 1912
- Born: 11 November 1834; Vienna
- Died: 10 December 1919 (aged 85); Vienna
- Known for: Ichthyologische Notizen and other works on ichthyology and herpetology
- Scientific career
- Fields: Zoologist, ichthyology, herpetology
- Workplaces: Natural History Museum, Vienna, Harvard University
- Author abbrev. (zoology): Steindachner

Franz Steindachner (11 November 1834 – 10 December 1919) was an Austrian zoologist, ichthyologist and herpetologist. He published over 200 papers on fishes and over 50 papers on reptiles and amphibians. Steindachner described hundreds of new species of fish and dozens of new amphibians and reptiles. Several dozen species of animals are named after him.

== Life and career ==
Steindachner was born on 11 November 1834 in Vienna. Being interested in natural history, he took up the study of fossil fishes on the recommendation of his friend Eduard Suess (1831–1914). In 1860 he was appointed to the position of director of the fish collection at the Natural History Museum, Vienna, a position which had remained vacant since the death of Johann Jakob Heckel (1790–1857).

Steindachner's reputation as an ichthyologist grew, and in 1868 he was invited by Louis Agassiz (1807–1873) to accept a position at the Museum of Comparative Zoology at Harvard University. Steindachner took part in the Hassler Expedition of 1871–1872 (a journey that circumnavigated South America from Boston to San Francisco). In 1874 he returned to Vienna, and in 1887 was appointed director of the zoological department of the Natural History Museum. In 1898 he was promoted to director of the museum.

He travelled extensively during his career, his research trips taking him throughout the Iberian Peninsula, the Red Sea, the Canary Islands, Senegal, Latin America, et al. In his zoological studies, his interests were mainly from a systematic and faunistic standpoint.

Among his better known works in ichthyology are Ichthyologische Notizen (1863, published over 8 editions), Ichthyologische Beiträge (1874), and Beiträge zur Kenntniss der Flussfische Südamerikas (1879), the latter work dealing with river fish of South America. In the field of herpetology, he published Die Schlangen und Eidechsen der Galapagos-Inseln (Snakes and lizards of the Galápagos Islands, 1875).

From 1875, Steindachner was member of the Vienna Academy of Sciences. In 1892, he became a member of the German National Academy of Sciences Leopoldina.

Steindachner died on 10 December 1919 in Vienna.

== Eponymy ==
A number of taxa have been named from Steindachner's collections after him:

Fish genera

- Steindachneria, a fish genus of the western Atlantic; (Steindachneria argentea, commonly known as the luminous hake).
- Steindachneridion, a genus of fish in South America discovered by Steindachner, is named after him.
- Steindachnerina, a genus of fish in South America.

Fish species

- Leptagoniates steindachneri, an Amazon river fish
- Istiblennius steindachneri, a combtooth blenny from the Western Indian Ocean
- Nosferatu steindachneri, a Mexican cichlid
- Bario steindachneri, a characin from Peru and Brazil
- Taractichthys steindachneri (Döderlein, 1883), a pomfret from the Indo-Pacific.
- Synodontis steindachneri from Africa, an upside down catfish
- Trachydoras steindachneri, a thorny catfish from the Amazon
- Labeobarbus steindachneri, a barb from the Cameroons
- Phoxinus steindachneri, a minnow from north east Asia
- Raiamas steindachneri, a cyprinid
- Rhinoptera steindachneri, the Golden Cownosed ray
- Cathorops steindachneri, Steindachner's sea catfish
- Gymnothorax steindachneri, the Brown Speckled Moray eel
- Gnathocharax steindachneri, the Arowana Tetra, a characin from the Amazon and Orinoco
- Geophagus steindachneri the Redhump Eartheater, a cichlid from Northeast South America
- Luciobarbus steindachneri, a barbel from the Iberian peninsula
- Ophioblennius steindachneri, a blenny from the Eastern Pacific
- Petrocephalus steindachneri Fowler, 1958, a Mormyrid from Tanzania
- Cynoscion steindachneri, a drum
- Hypoptopoma steindachneri, a Loricariid
- Haemulon steindachneri, a chere-chere grunt
- Umbrina steindachneri, a drum
- Hypomasticus steindachneri, a South American headstander
- Nematabramis steindachnerii Popta, 1905, a Bornean danio

Reptile species

- Amphisbaena steindachneri, a worm lizard from South America
- Chelodina steindachneri, a long necked turtle from Australia
- Lucasium steindachneri, a gecko from Australia
- Kinosternon steindachneri, the Florida mud turtle
- Lioscincus steindachneri, a skink from New Caledonia
- Micrurus steindachneri, a venomous coral snake from South America
- Palea steindachneri, a softshell turtle from China and Southeast Asia
- Phrynocephalus steindachneri, a lizard (synonym of Phrynocephalus przewalskii)
- Pseudalsophis steindachneri, a species of snake from the Galápagos Islands

Bird species and subspecies

- Speckle-chested piculet, Picumnus steindachneri
- Australasian pipit, Anthus novaeseelandiae steindachner from the Antipodes Islands.

Amphibian species

- Hyperolius steindachneri, a frog from Africa
- Phrynobatrachus steindachneri, a frog from Africa
- Sclerophrys steindachneri, a toad found throughout sub tropical Africa

Invertebrates

- Aphonopelma steindachneri, a spider from the area of Southern California to Baja California.
- Bombus steindachneri, a Mexican bumblebee
- Neduba steindachneri, a katydid
- Stenomax steindachneri, a beetle
- Copiopteryx steindachneri, a moth
- Onchidella steindachneri, a sea slug
- Abralia steindachneri, a squid
- Ceratothoa steindachneri, a fish parasite

== See also ==
- Category:Taxa named by Franz Steindachner
