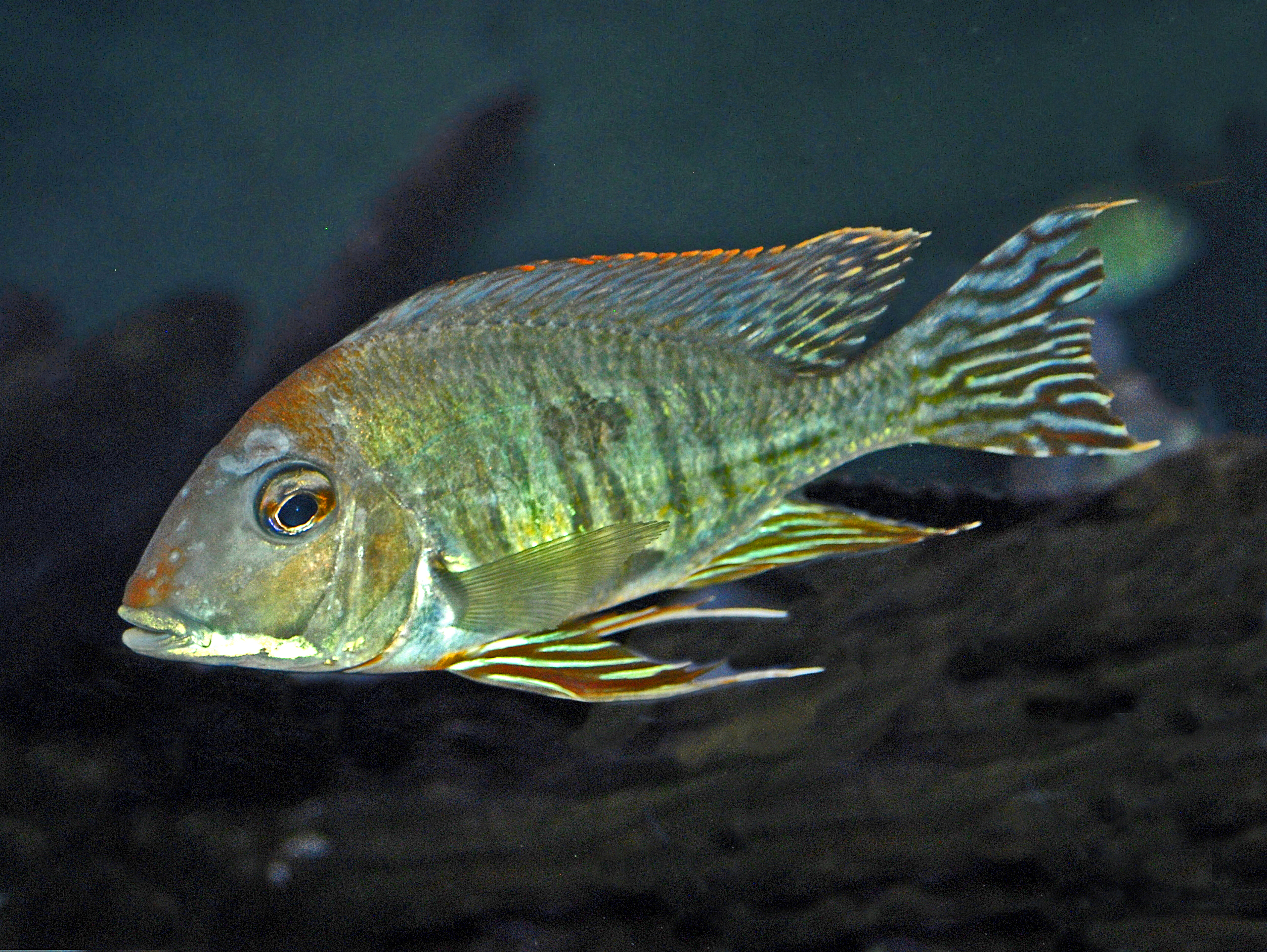
- Geophagus altifrons

Scientific classification
- Kingdom: Animalia
- Phylum: Chordata
- Class: Actinopterygii
- Division: Teleostei
- Order: Cichliformes
- Family: Cichlidae
- Subfamily: Cichlinae
- Tribe: Geophagini
- Subtribe: Geophagina
- Genus: Geophagus; Heckel, 1840

Type species
- Geophagus altifrons Heckel, 1840

= Geophagus =

Genus of fishes

Geophagus is a genus of cichlids that mainly live in South America as far south as Argentina and Uruguay, but a single species, G. crassilabris is from Panama. They are found in a wide range of freshwater habitats. They are part of a group popularly known as eartheaters and mostly feed by picking up mouthfuls of sediment to sift out food items such as invertebrates, plant material and detritus. The largest species reach up to 28 cm (11 in) in standard length. They are mostly kept in aquariums.

== As an invasive species ==
Geophagus “surinamensis” was an invasive species in Malaysia, recently found in Putrajaya, the populations are now controlled by giant snakeheads.

== Taxonomy ==
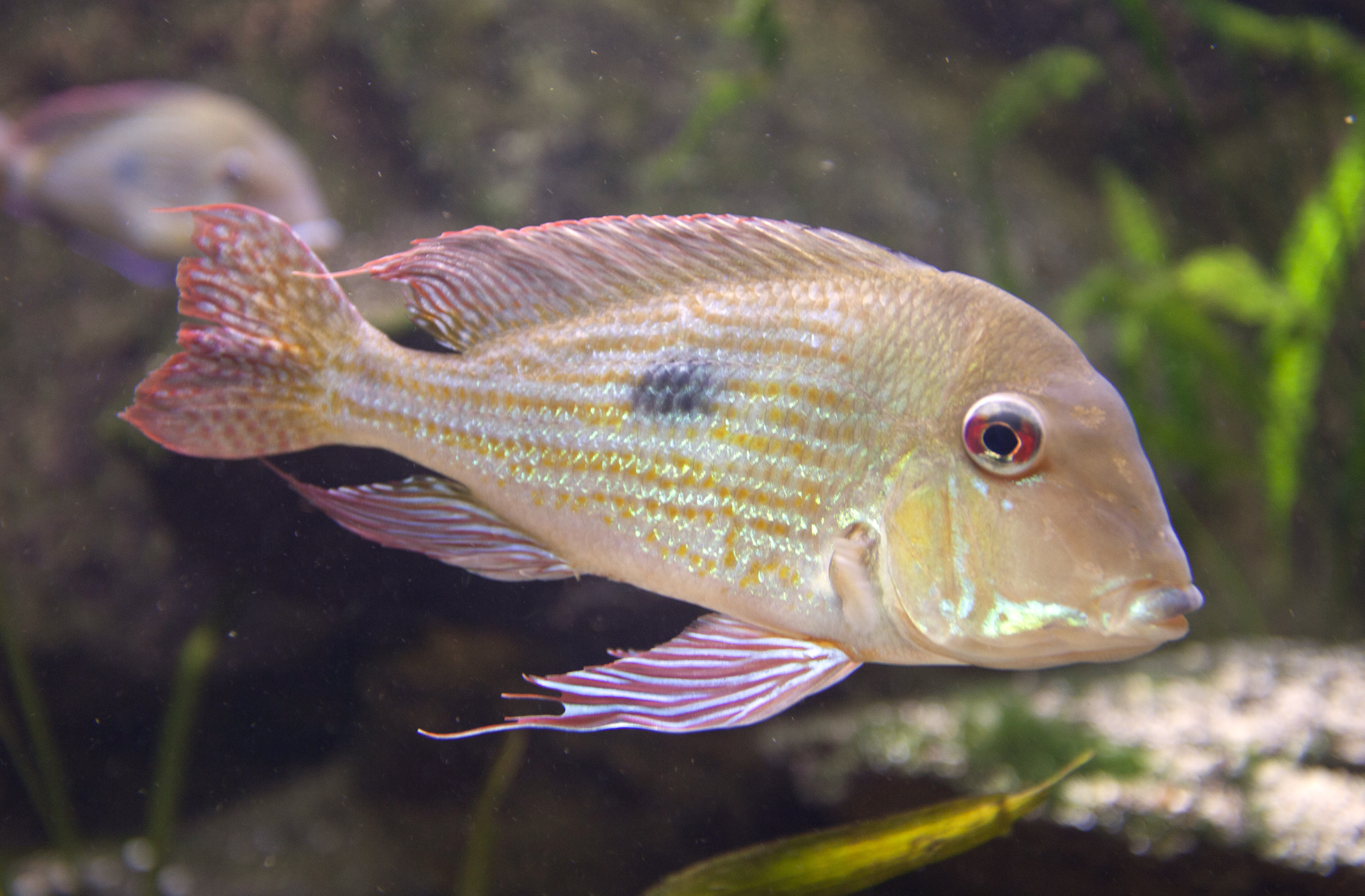
A species in the Geophagus surinamensis complex, a member of Geophagus sensu stricto

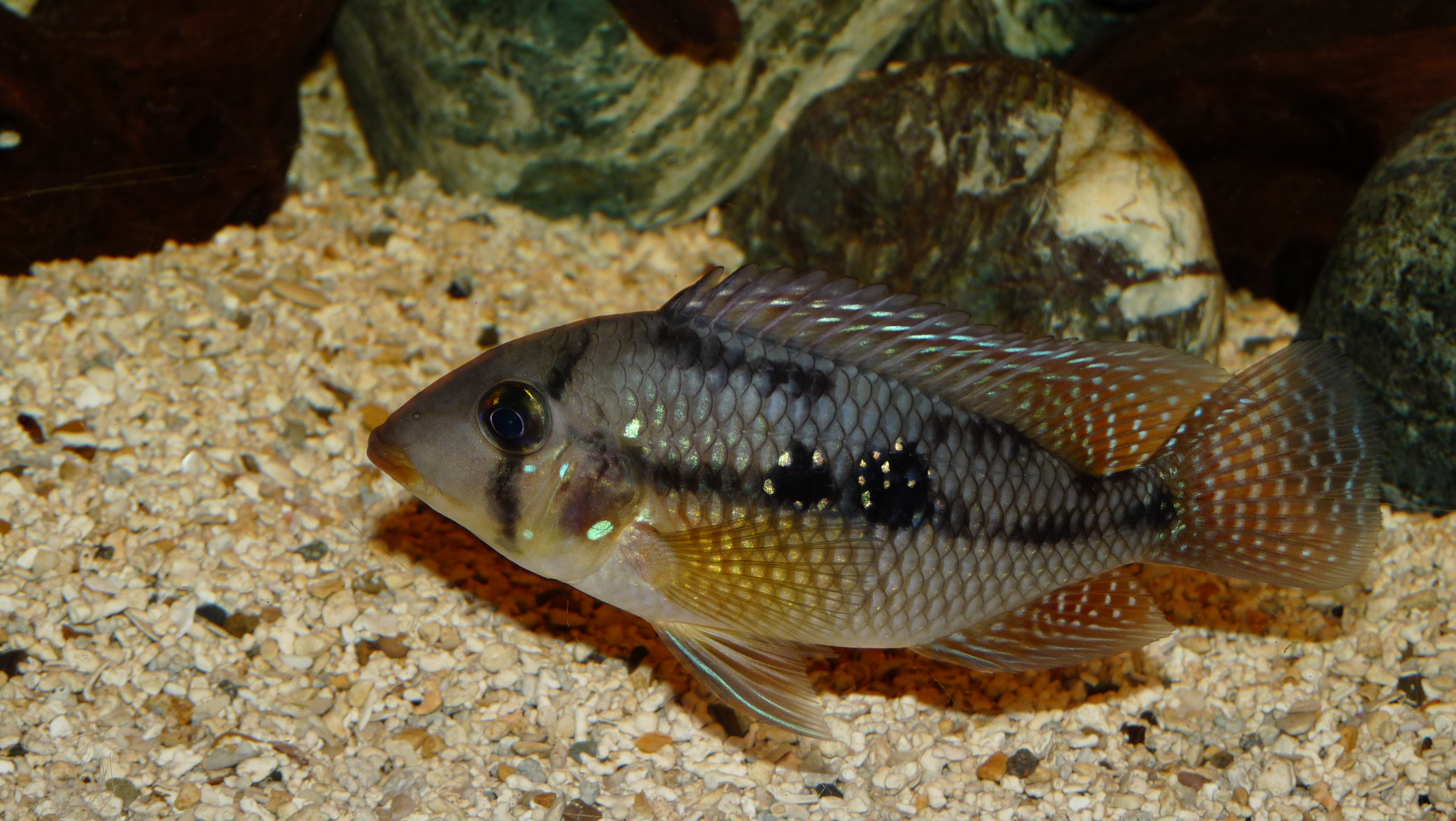
Young Geophagus brasiliensis

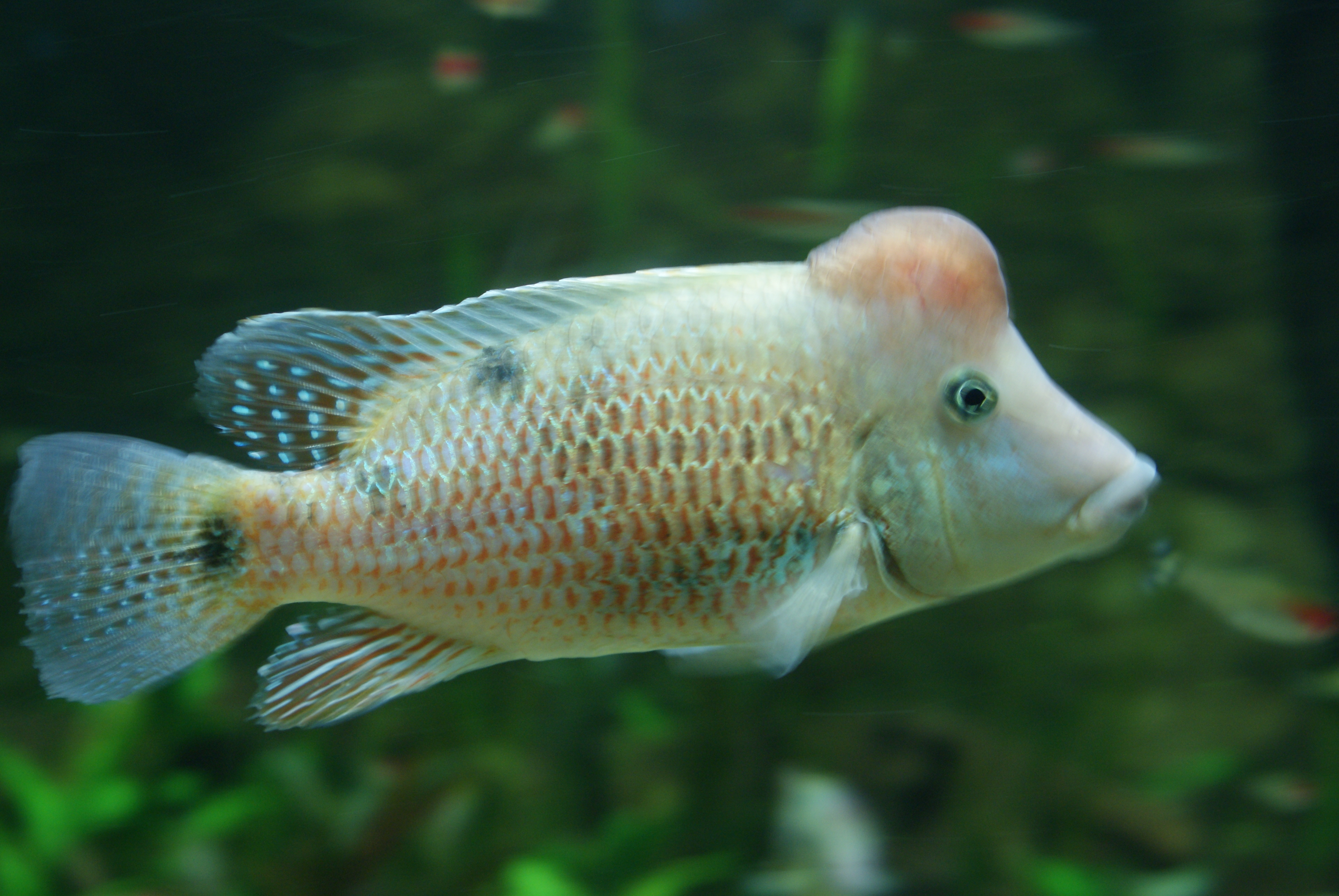
Geophagus steindachneri

Some cichlids previously included in this genus have been reallocated to Biotodoma, Gymnogeophagus or Satanoperca. Even with these as separate genera, Geophagus is currently polyphyletic and in need of further taxonomic revision. There are three main groups:

- Geophagus sensu stricto are mostly relatively peaceful, often have long fin extensions and are native to the Amazon, Orinoco and Parnaíba basins, as well as rivers of the Guianas. This group can be divided into two subgroups: The first is the G. surinamensis complex, which includes most species (fish in the aquarium trade often are identified as G. surinamensis itself, but they are typically other members of this complex.) The second subgroup contains G. argyrostictus, G. gottwaldi, G. grammepareius, G. harreri and G. taeniopareius, which are somewhat less peaceful and can be separated from the G. surinamensis complex by their dark stripe below the eye (however, this feature is shared with the next group).
- G. brasiliensis complex (including G. diamantinensis, G. iporangensis, G. itapicuruensis, G. multiocellus, G. obscurus, G. rufomarginatus and G. santosi) are more robust and aggressive species found in river basins of eastern and southeastern Brazil, Uruguay and northeastern Argentina.
- G. steindachneri complex (including G. crassilabris and G. pellegrini and undescribed species entering the aquarium trade from Colombia) found west of the Andes in northern and western Colombia, northwestern Venezuela and Panama where adult males develop a distinct, bulbous red forehead.

=== Species ===
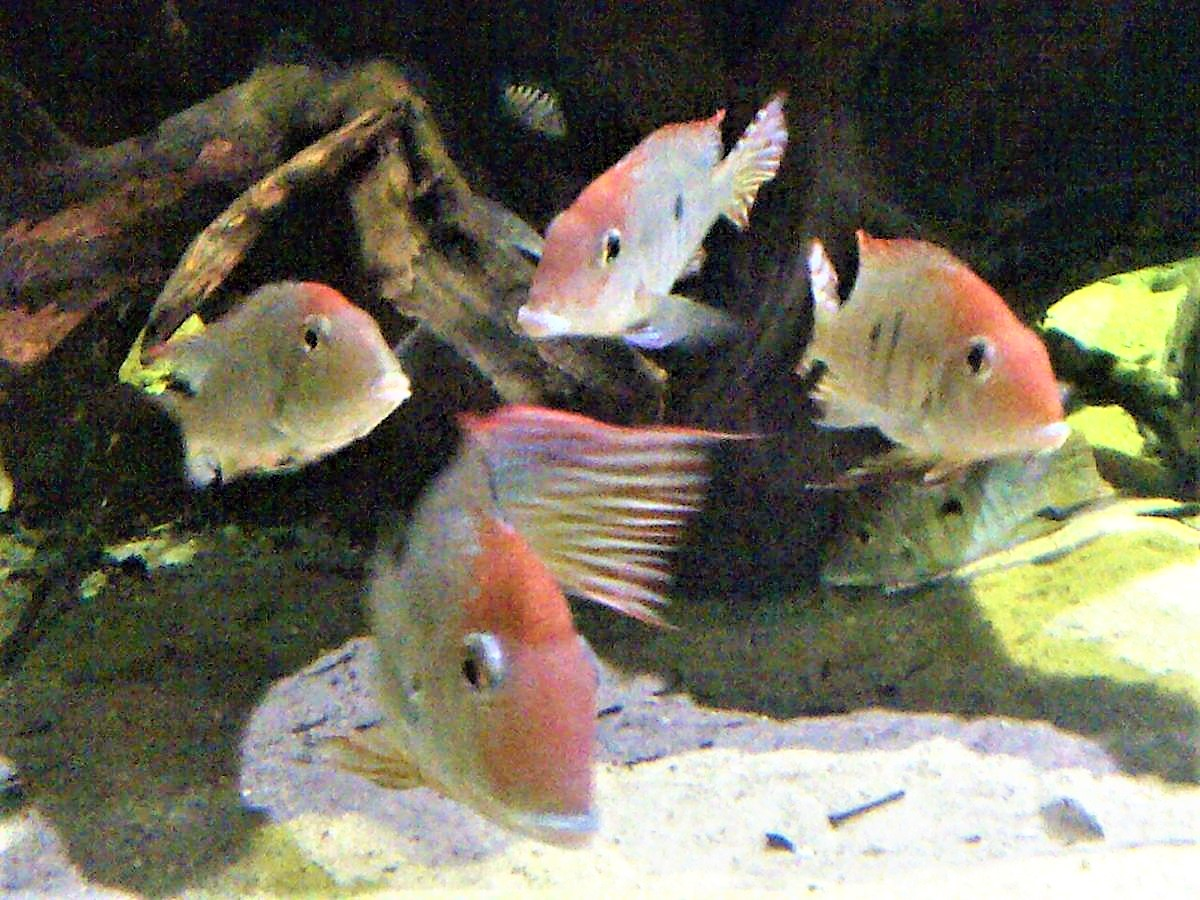
Geophagus pyrocephalus also known as Geophagus sp. "orange head" from the Tapajós River.

There are currently 33 recognized species in this genus.

- Geophagus abalios López-Fernández & Taphorn, 2004
- Geophagus altifrons Heckel, 1840
- Geophagus argyrostictus S. O. Kullander, 1991
- Geophagus brachybranchus S. O. Kullander & Nijssen, 1989
- Geophagus brasiliensis (Quoy & Gaimard, 1824) (Pearl cichlid)
- Geophagus brokopondo S. O. Kullander & Nijssen, 1989
- Geophagus camopiensis Pellegrin, 1903 (Oyapock eartheater)
- Geophagus crassilabris Steindachner, 1876 (Panamanian eartheater)
- Geophagus crocatus Hauser & López-Fernández, 2013
- Geophagus diamantinensis Mattos, W. J. E. M. Costa & A. C. A. Santos, 2015
- Geophagus dicrozoster López-Fernández & Taphorn, 2004
- Geophagus gottwaldi I. Schindler & Staeck, 2006
- Geophagus grammepareius S. O. Kullander & Taphorn, 1992
- Geophagus harreri J. P. Gosse, 1976 (Maroni eartheater)
- Geophagus iporangensis Haseman, 1911
- Geophagus itapicuruensis Haseman, 1911
- Geophagus megasema Heckel, 1840
- Geophagus mirabilis Deprá, S. O. Kullander, Pavanelli & da Graça, 2014
- Geophagus multiocellus Mattos & W. J. E. M. Costa, 2018
- Geophagus neambi P. H. L. Lucinda, C. A. S. de Lucena & Assis, 2010
- Geophagus obscurus (Castelnau, 1855)
- Geophagus parnaibae Staeck & I. Schindler, 2006
- Geophagus pellegrini Regan, 1912 (Yellowhump eartheater)
- Geophagus pirangaensis Assis, Dergam, Cunha, Machado, Hrbek, Vicente, Queiroz et Henschel, 2026
- Geophagus proximus (Castelnau, 1855)
- Geophagus pyrineusi Deprá, Ohara & Silva, 2022
- Geophagus pyrocephalus Chuctaya et al., 2022
- Geophagus rufomarginatus Mattos & W. J. E. M. Costa, 2018
- Geophagus santosi Mattos & W. J. E. M. Costa, 2018
- Geophagus steindachneri C. H. Eigenmann & Hildebrand, 1922 (Redhump eartheater)
- Geophagus surinamensis (Bloch, 1791) (Red-striped eartheater)
- Geophagus sveni P. H. F. Lucinda, C. A. S. de Lucena & Assis, 2010
- Geophagus taeniopareius S. O. Kullander & Royero-L., 1992
- Geophagus winemilleri López-Fernández & Taphorn, 2004
