= Neduba convexa =

Scientific classification
- Domain: Eukaryota
- Kingdom: Animalia
- Phylum: Arthropoda
- Class: Insecta
- Order: Orthoptera
- Suborder: Ensifera
- Family: Tettigoniidae
- Tribe: Nedubini
- Genus: Neduba
- Species: N. convexa

Binomial name
- Neduba convexa Caudell, 1907

Species of cricket-like animal

Neduba convexa is a species of shield-backed katydid in the family Tettigoniidae. It is found in North America.
