= Neduba carinata =

Keeled shieldback

Scientific classification
- Kingdom: Animalia
- Phylum: Arthropoda
- Class: Insecta
- Order: Orthoptera
- Suborder: Ensifera
- Family: Tettigoniidae
- Genus: Neduba
- Species: N. carinata

Binomial name
- Neduba carinata Walker, 1869

Species of cricket-like animal

Neduba carinata is a shield-backed katydid known only from Fremont Peak in San Benito County, California. This name has often been used to describe katydids across a broad portion of the western United States, but most of its subspecies have been elevated to species level, and as currently conceived it only applies to a population on Fremont Peak with a pronotum slightly longer and narrower than the similar N. diabloica.
