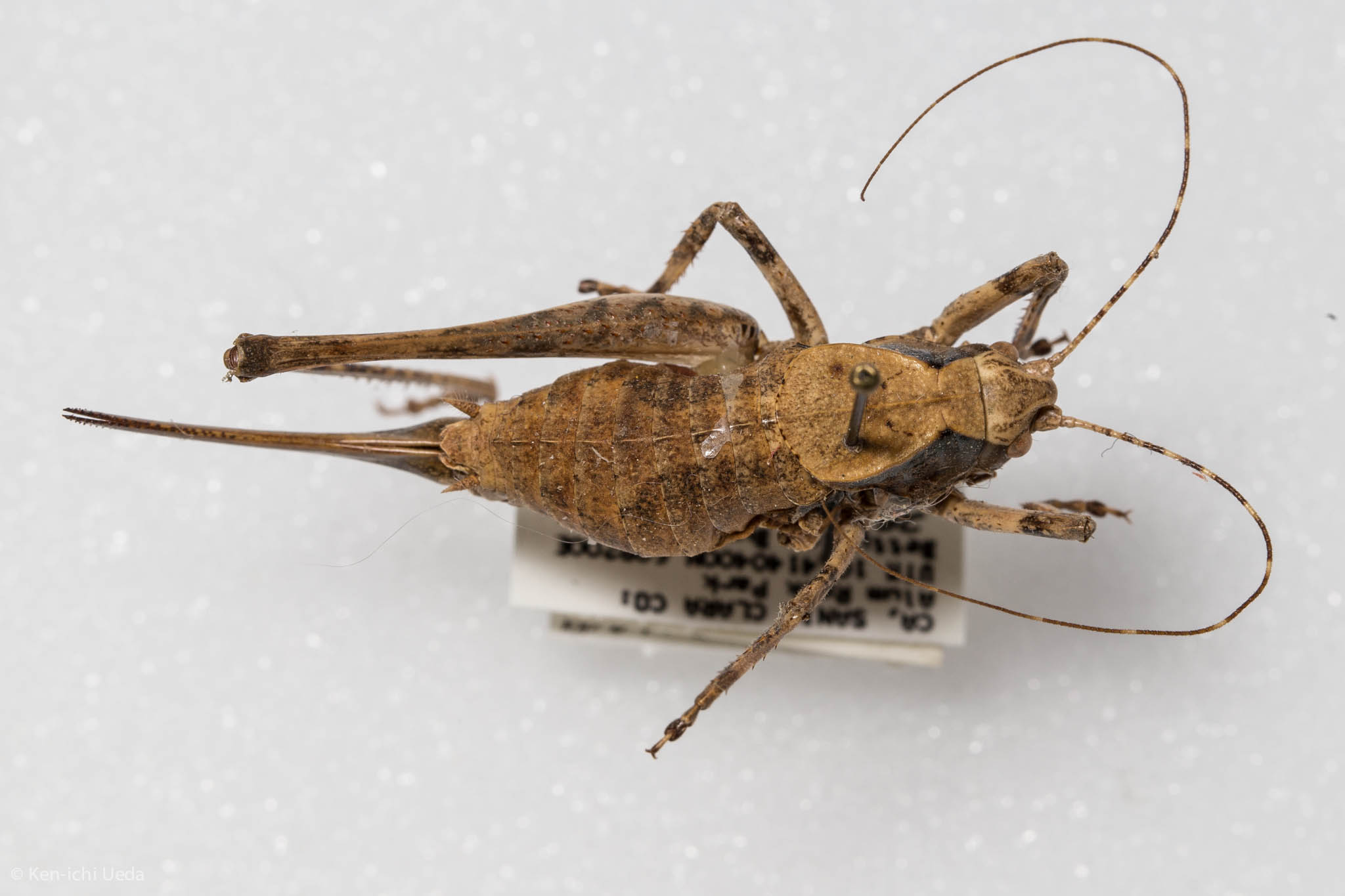

Scientific classification
- Domain: Eukaryota
- Kingdom: Animalia
- Phylum: Arthropoda
- Class: Insecta
- Order: Orthoptera
- Suborder: Ensifera
- Family: Tettigoniidae
- Genus: Neduba
- Species: N. diabolica

Binomial name
- Neduba diabolica (Scudder, 1899)

= Neduba diabolica =

Species of cricket-like animal

Neduba diabolica is a species of shield-backed katydids in the family Tettigoniidae. It is found in North America.
