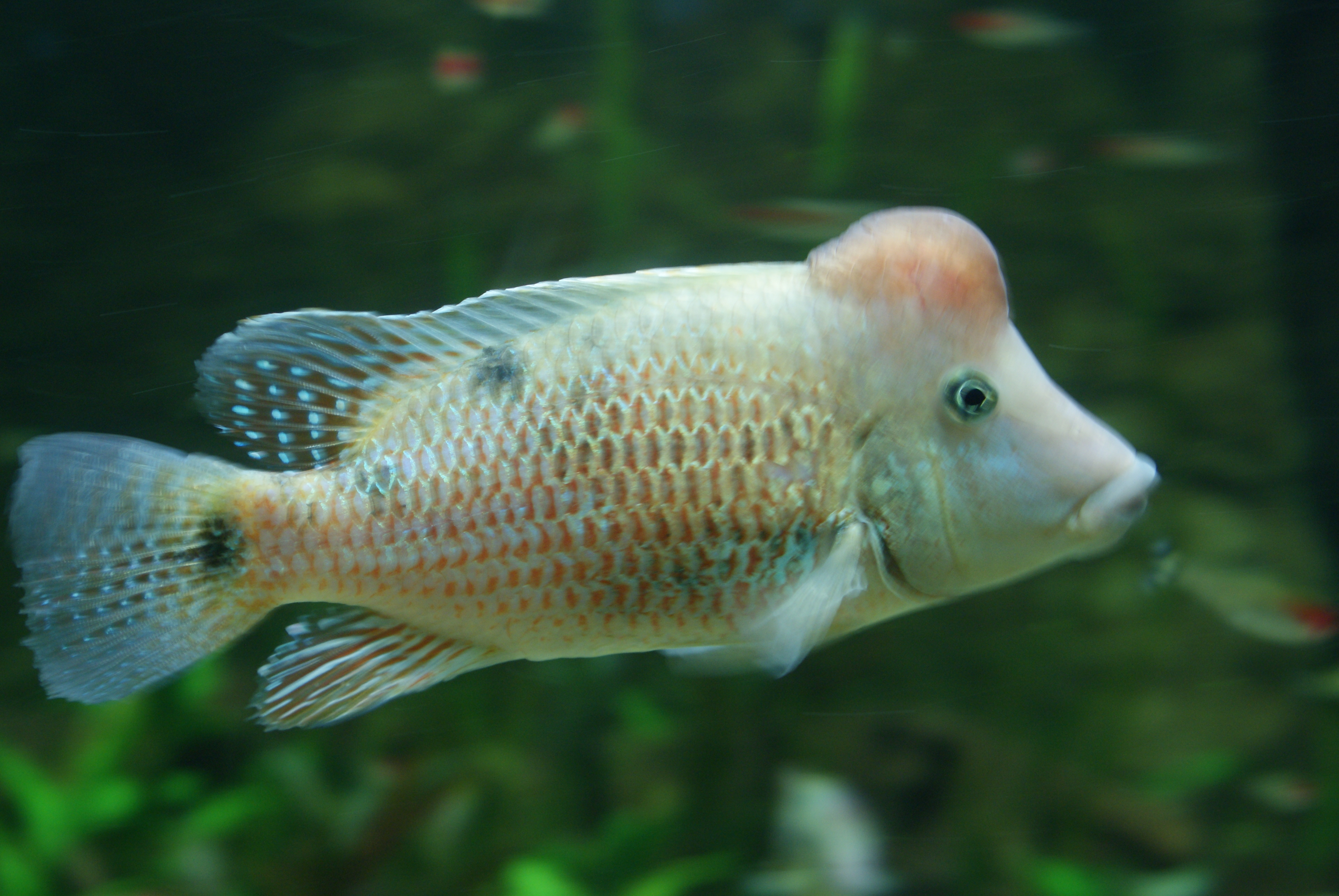

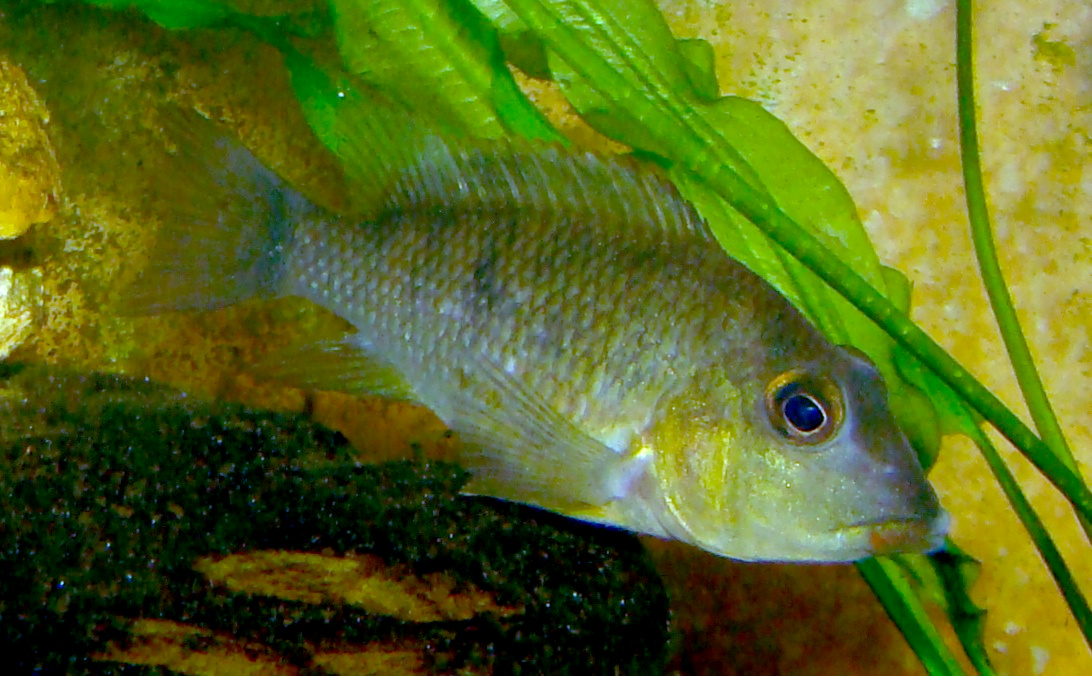
- male above, female below

Scientific classification
- Kingdom: Animalia
- Phylum: Chordata
- Class: Actinopterygii
- Order: Cichliformes
- Family: Cichlidae
- Genus: Geophagus
- Species: G. steindachneri

Binomial name
- Geophagus steindachneri C. H. Eigenmann & Hildebrand, 1922

Synonyms
- Geophagus hondae Regan, 1912; Geophagus magdalena Brind, 1943

= Redhump eartheater =

Species of fish

The redhump eartheater (Geophagus steindachneri) is a species of eartheater cichlid from freshwater habitats in northwestern South America.

== Distribution ==
The redhump eartheater is native to river drainages in northern and western Colombia (Magdalena, Cauca and Sinú basins), and northwestern Venezuela (El Limón River). It lives in water that is slightly acidic to neutral (6.5 to 7.0 pH) and typically about 24 to 26 °C (75 to 79 °F). It is stenohaline, found only in mainland freshwater environments.

== Etymology ==
The cichlid is named in honor of Austrian ichthyologist Franz Steindachner (1834–1919).

== Food ==
Wild redhump eartheaters take substrate material into their mouths and sift out inedible bits of sand or gravel, while consuming detritus and small organisms.

== Reproduction ==
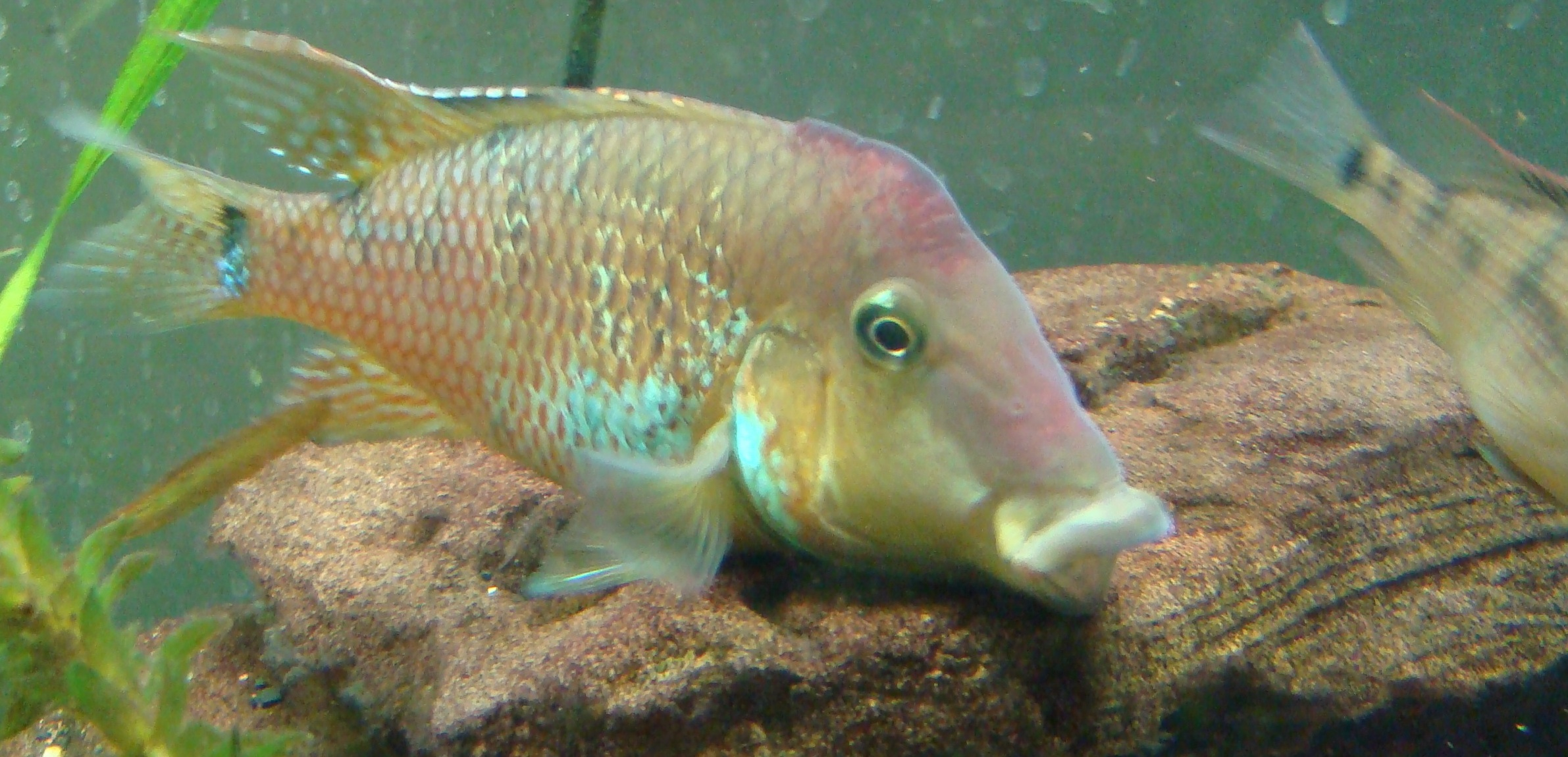
Displaying male

Redhump eartheaters are immediate maternal mouthbrooders. These fish grow relatively quickly, and can be sexed as subadults. Sexual dimorphism is clear - males have a large, red nuptial hump on their heads and grow larger than the females. Mature males develop an iridescence on the scales on their sides and very large humps. Males will display to females by opening their mouths and flaring their gills. Nonreceptive females may be driven from the spawning area. Spawning takes place on a smooth rock or clean sand bed. The female lays one or two eggs, then the male fertilizes them. The female immediately takes the fertilized eggs into her mouth and proceeds to lay more eggs. This continues until spawning is completed. The female carries the eggs until they are free-swimming and have absorbed their yolk sacs, about 2–3 weeks. She eats little to no food during this period. Eventually, she releases them and allows them to search for food, taking them back into her mouth when she feels threatened. The brooding female often signals to her fry when danger is present, and shuts her fry out of her mouth when encouraging then to forage.
