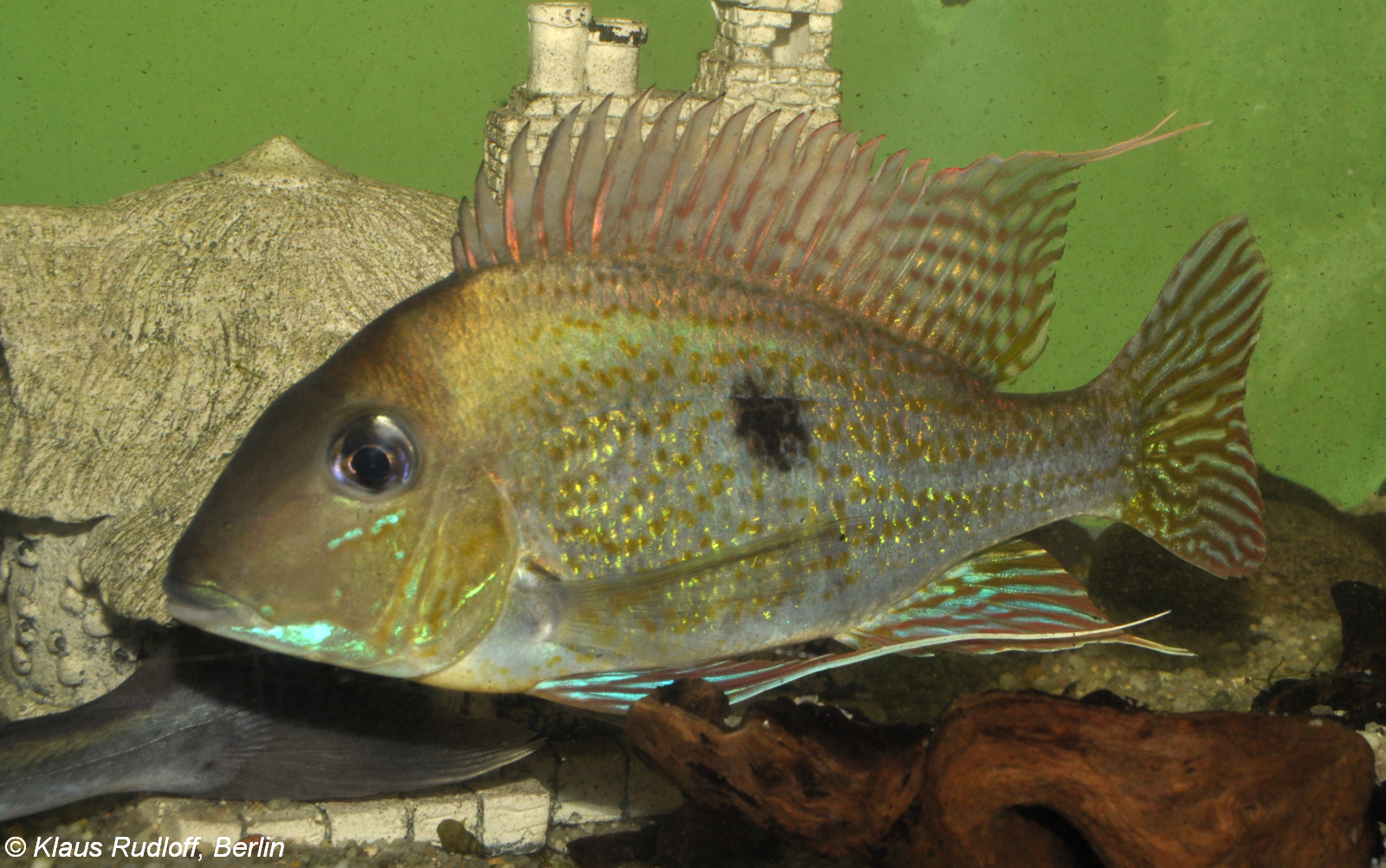

Conservation status
- Least Concern (IUCN 3.1)

Scientific classification
- Kingdom: Animalia
- Phylum: Chordata
- Class: Actinopterygii
- Order: Cichliformes
- Family: Cichlidae
- Genus: Geophagus
- Species: G. sveni

Binomial name
- Geophagus sveni P. H. L. Lucinda, C. A. S. de Lucena & Assis, 2010

= Geophagus sveni =

Species of fish

Geophagus sveni is a Geophagini cichlid native to the Tocantins River drainage in Brazil. Geophagus sveni is a medium-sized cichlid that reaches approximately 225 mm (10 in) in standard length (SL), and is usually found in the Tocantins River basin. Similarly, Geophagus sveni has a typical teleost encephalon, without significant intraspecific variation and hence without dimorphic traits.

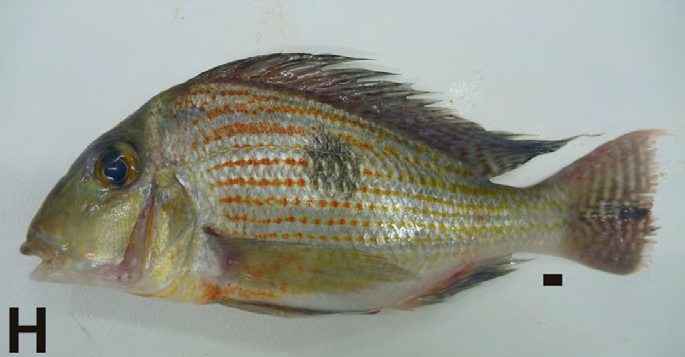
Tocantins, Brazil, scale bar = 1 cm

== Etymology ==
The fish is named in honor of Sven O. Kullander of the Swedish Museum of Natural History, for his many contributions to cichlid systematics.
