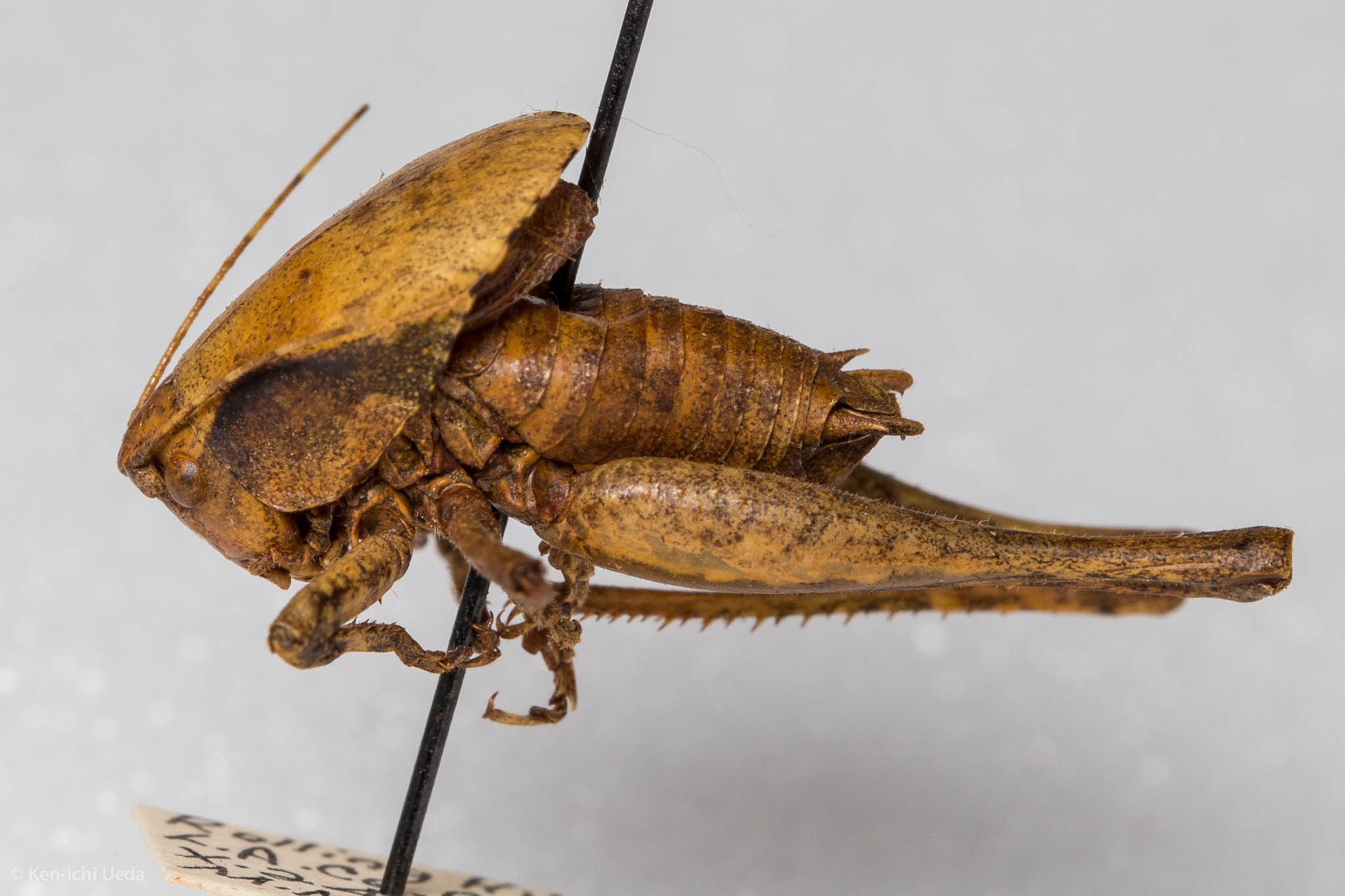

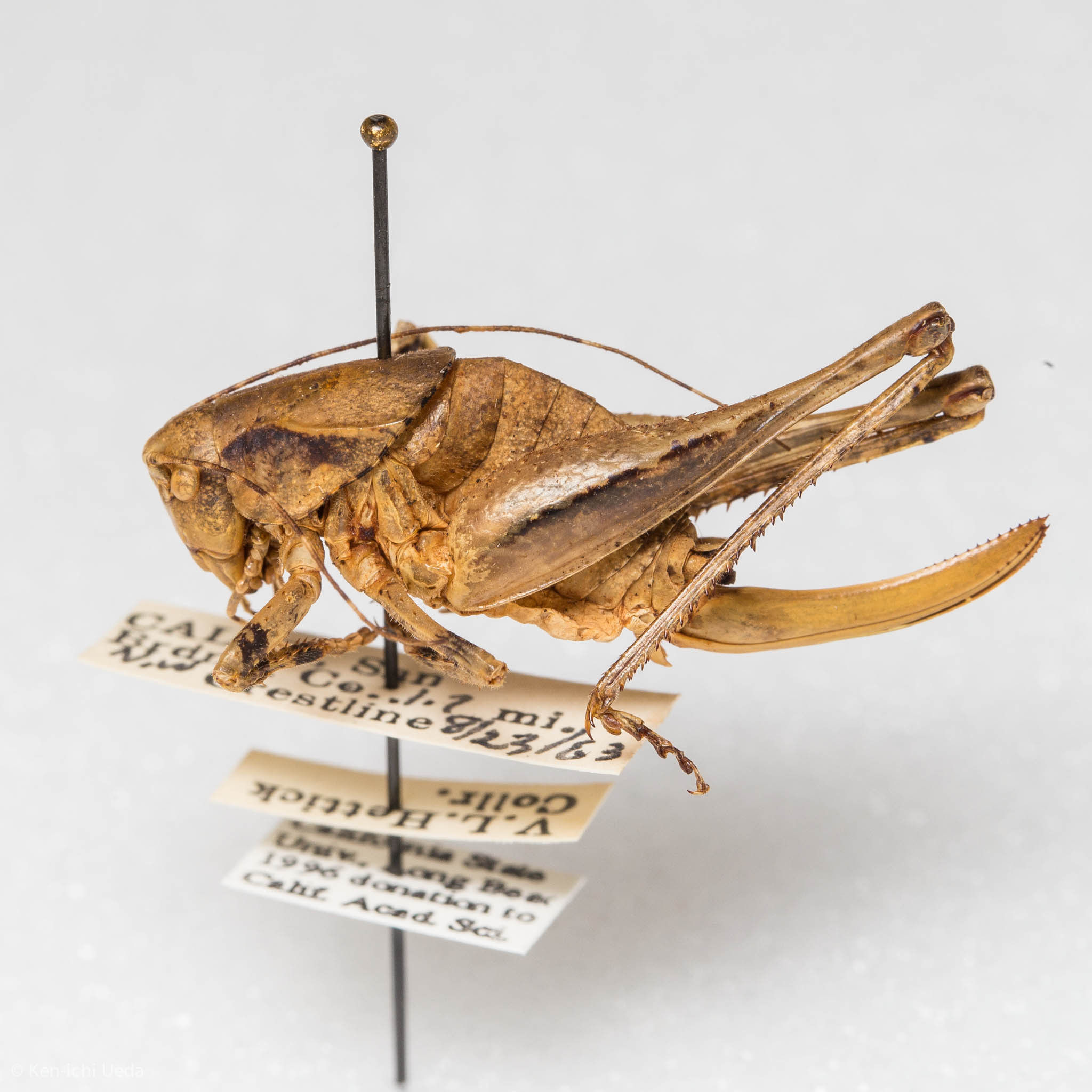
- Neduba morsei, male and female

Scientific classification
- Kingdom: Animalia
- Phylum: Arthropoda
- Class: Insecta
- Order: Orthoptera
- Suborder: Ensifera
- Family: Tettigoniidae
- Subfamily: Tettigoniinae
- Tribe: Nedubini
- Genus: Neduba; Walker, 1869

Type species
- Neduba carinata Walker, 1869

= Neduba =

Genus of cricket-like animals

Neduba is a genus of insects in the family Tettigoniidae (katydids), which is native to North America.

== Species ==
The following species (1 extinct) belong to the genus Neduba:

- Neduba ambagiosa Cole, Weissman & Lightfoot, 2021
- Neduba arborea Cole, Weissman & Lightfoot, 2021
- Neduba carinata Walker, 1869
- Neduba cascadia Cole, Weissman & Lightfoot, 2021
- Neduba castanea (Scudder, 1899)
- Neduba convexa Caudell, 1907
- Neduba diabolica (Scudder, 1899)
- Neduba duplocantans Cole, Weissman & Lightfoot, 2021
- †Neduba extincta Rentz, 1977
- Neduba inversa Cole, Weissman & Lightfoot, 2021
- Neduba longiplutea Cole, Weissman & Lightfoot, 2021
- Neduba lucubrata Cole, Weissman & Lightfoot, 2021
- Neduba macneilli Rentz & Birchim, 1968 - Macneill's shieldback
- Neduba oblongata Cole, Weissman & Lightfoot, 2021
- Neduba propsti Rentz & Weissman, 1981 - Catalina shield-back cricket
- Neduba prorocantans Cole, Weissman & Lightfoot, 2021
- Neduba radicata Cole, Weissman & Lightfoot, 2021
- Neduba radocantans Cole, Weissman & Lightfoot, 2021
- Neduba sequoia Cole, Weissman & Lightfoot, 2021
- Neduba sierranus (Rehn & Hebard, 1911) - sierra shieldback
- Neduba steindachneri (Herman, 1874) - Steindachner's shieldback
