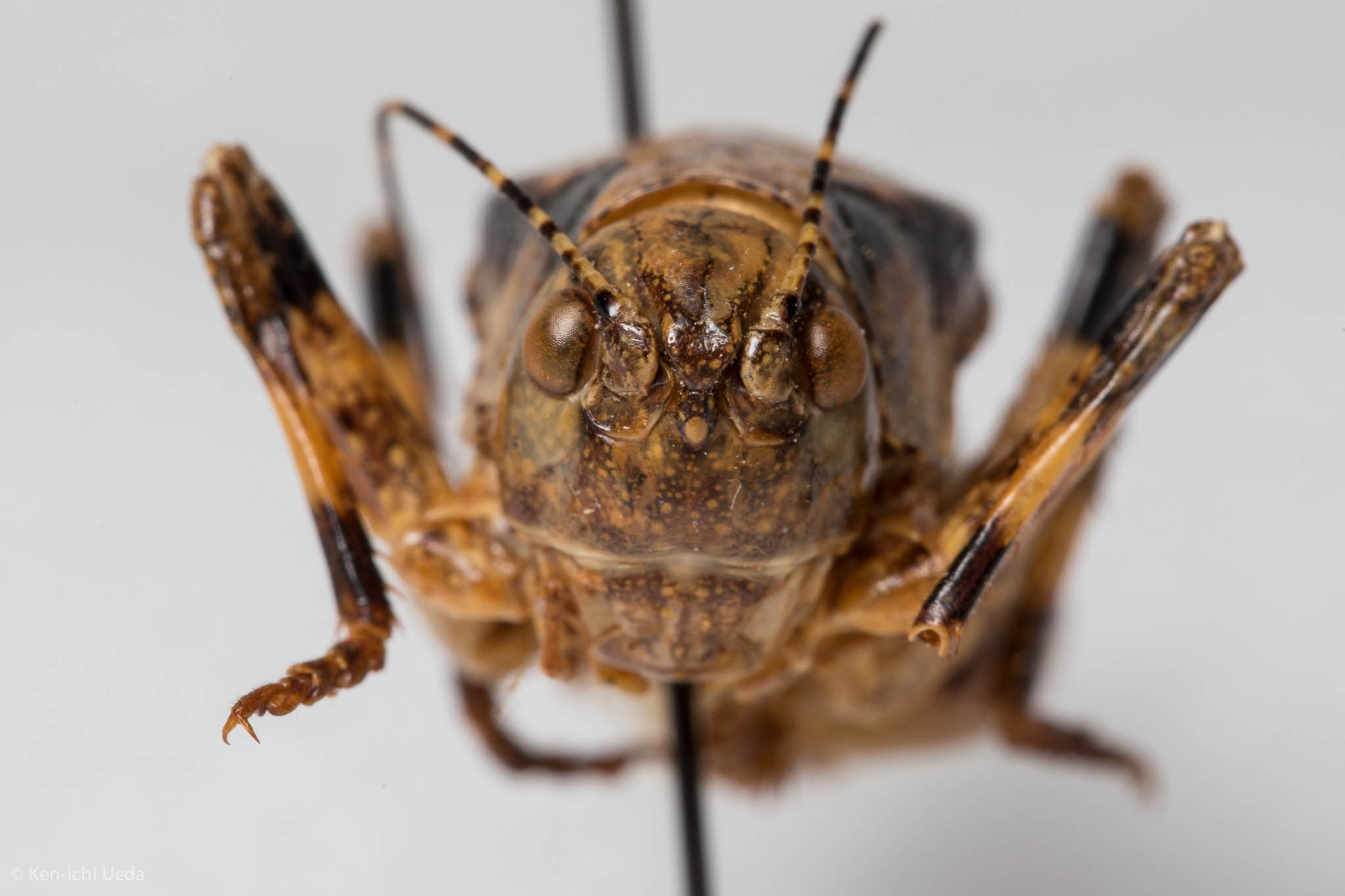

Scientific classification
- Domain: Eukaryota
- Kingdom: Animalia
- Phylum: Arthropoda
- Class: Insecta
- Order: Orthoptera
- Suborder: Ensifera
- Family: Tettigoniidae
- Tribe: Nedubini
- Genus: Neduba
- Species: N. macneilli

Binomial name
- Neduba macneilli Rentz & Birchim, 1968

= Neduba macneilli =

Species of cricket-like animal

Neduba macneilli, or Macneill's shieldback, is a species of shield-backed katydid in the family Tettigoniidae. It is found in North America.
