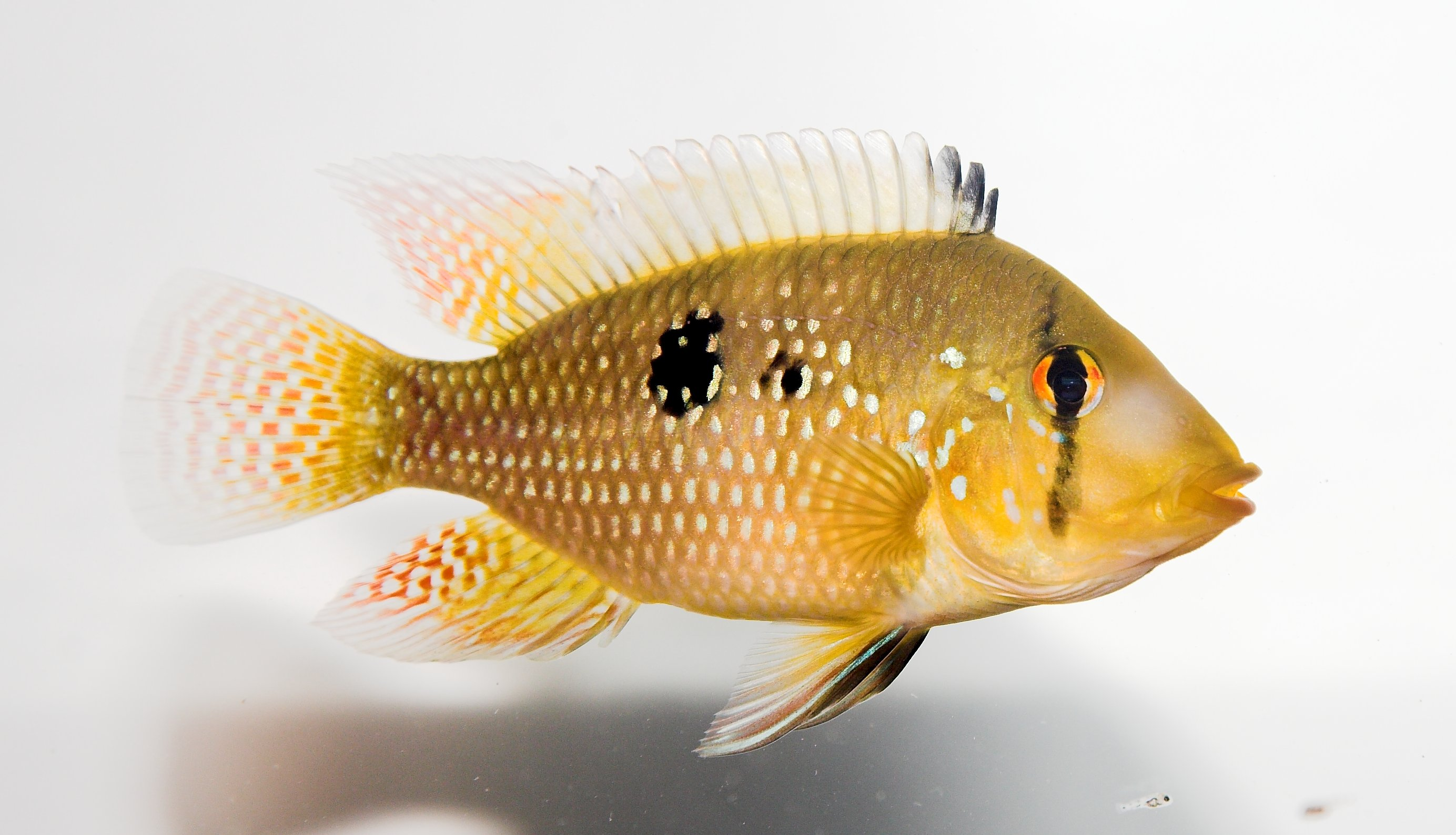
- A male pearl cichlid

Scientific classification
- Kingdom: Animalia
- Phylum: Chordata
- Class: Actinopterygii
- Order: Cichliformes
- Family: Cichlidae
- Genus: Geophagus
- Species: G. brasiliensis

Binomial name
- Geophagus brasiliensis (Quoy & Gaimard, 1824)

= Pearl cichlid =

Species of fish

The pearl cichlid (Geophagus brasiliensis) is a species of fish in the South American cichlid family. It is native to southeastern Brazil (north to Bahia), Paraguay, Uruguay and far northeastern Argentina, where it is found in rivers, lakes, and nearby slightly brackish lagoons. It has been introduced to several countries far from its native range, including the United States, Australia, the Philippines, and Taiwan. This species is popular among aquarists.

== Taxonomy ==
G. brasiliensis is part of a species complex that also includes the rarer G. diamantinensis, G. iporangensis, G. itapicuruensis, G. multiocellus, G. obscurus, G. rufomarginatus and G. santosi from the Brazilian state of Bahia (most species) or São Paulo (G. iporangensis).

== Description ==
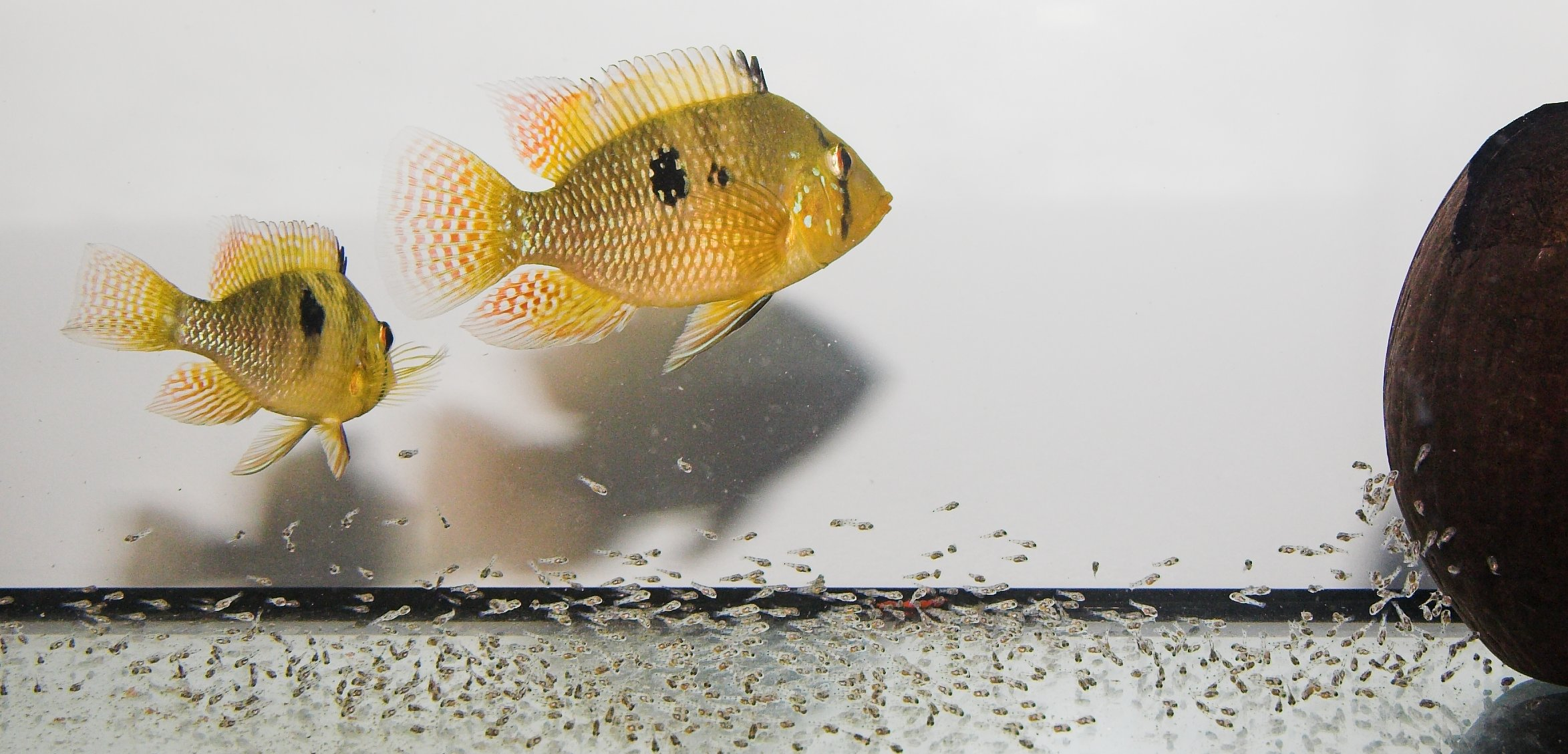
G. brasiliensis - pair with fry

The males can reach a length up to 25 cm (9.8 in), while females only reach a bit more than half that size. Its main body colour can be pale light brown to dark blue or almost purple; their colours change with moods and during mating sessions. The pearl cichlid has one dark spot which may visible on its body, located towards its tail; it also may display several black bands running top to bottom down its body. Its markings, which cover its body, are bright blue speckles which shine brightly in a healthy fish; they have red fins which may have blueish tones and be tipped in black, but these colours also may change, brighten, or fade depending on the mood. They can grow quite large, with males reaching just over a foot and females generally a little smaller. In a group, they usually pair up once they are around 2–3 in long; at this time they can be quite territorial, and keep other fish away from their breeding space.

== Breeding ==
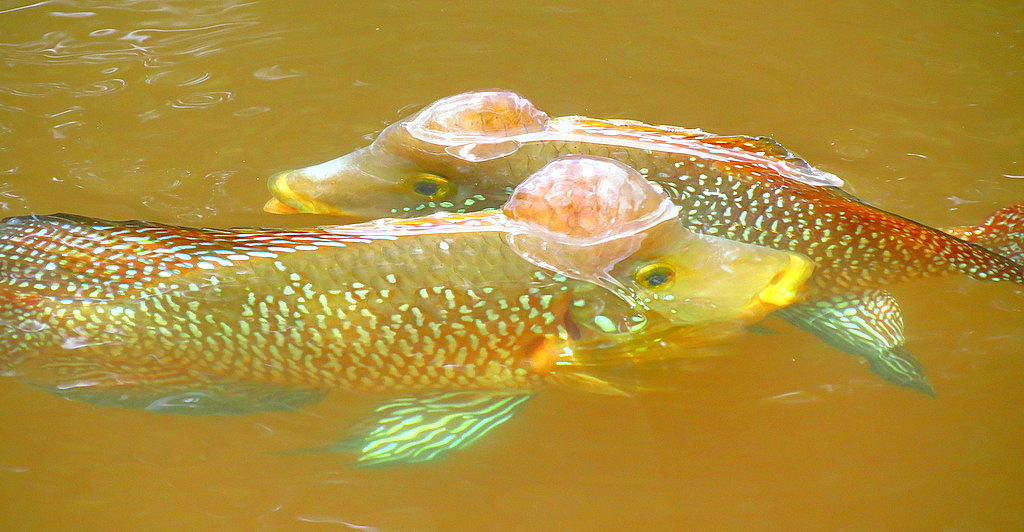
Males facing off, in Brazil

The sex of the fish is often unclear until it reaches adult size, at which point the size difference between the genders becomes pronounced. Breeders often attempt to pair the fish without sexing them; two females may pair up in which case the fish lay eggs that never hatch. Once a male-female pair is found, they tend to yield 150–200 offspring after successfully mating. Unlike certain other species, they do not have to be separated from their young.

== Introduction to Australia ==
In Australia, it has been released into the Tweed River system, New South Wales, and the Swan River system, Western Australia, where it inhabits fresh and brackish water at a wide range of pHs.

== Gallery ==
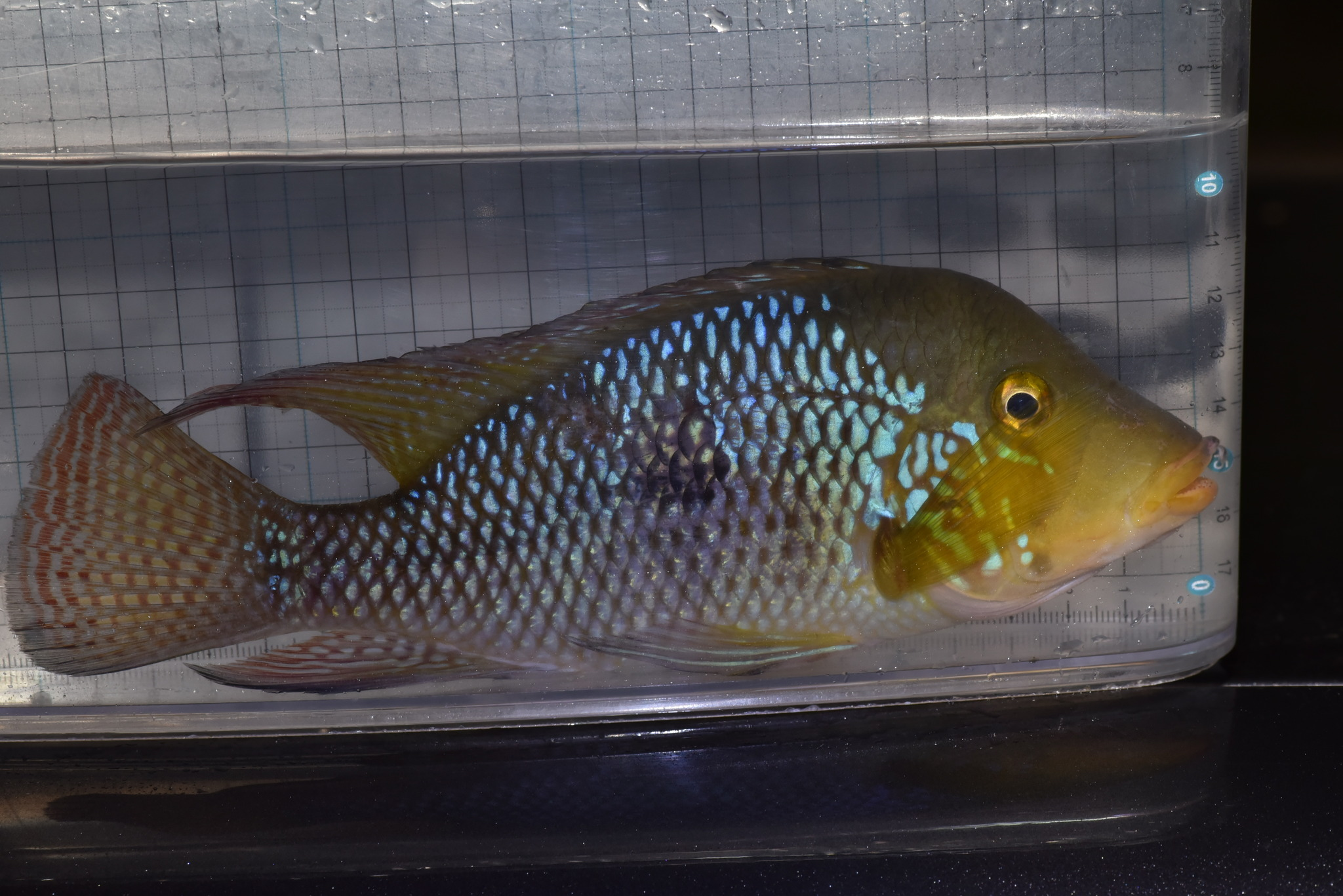

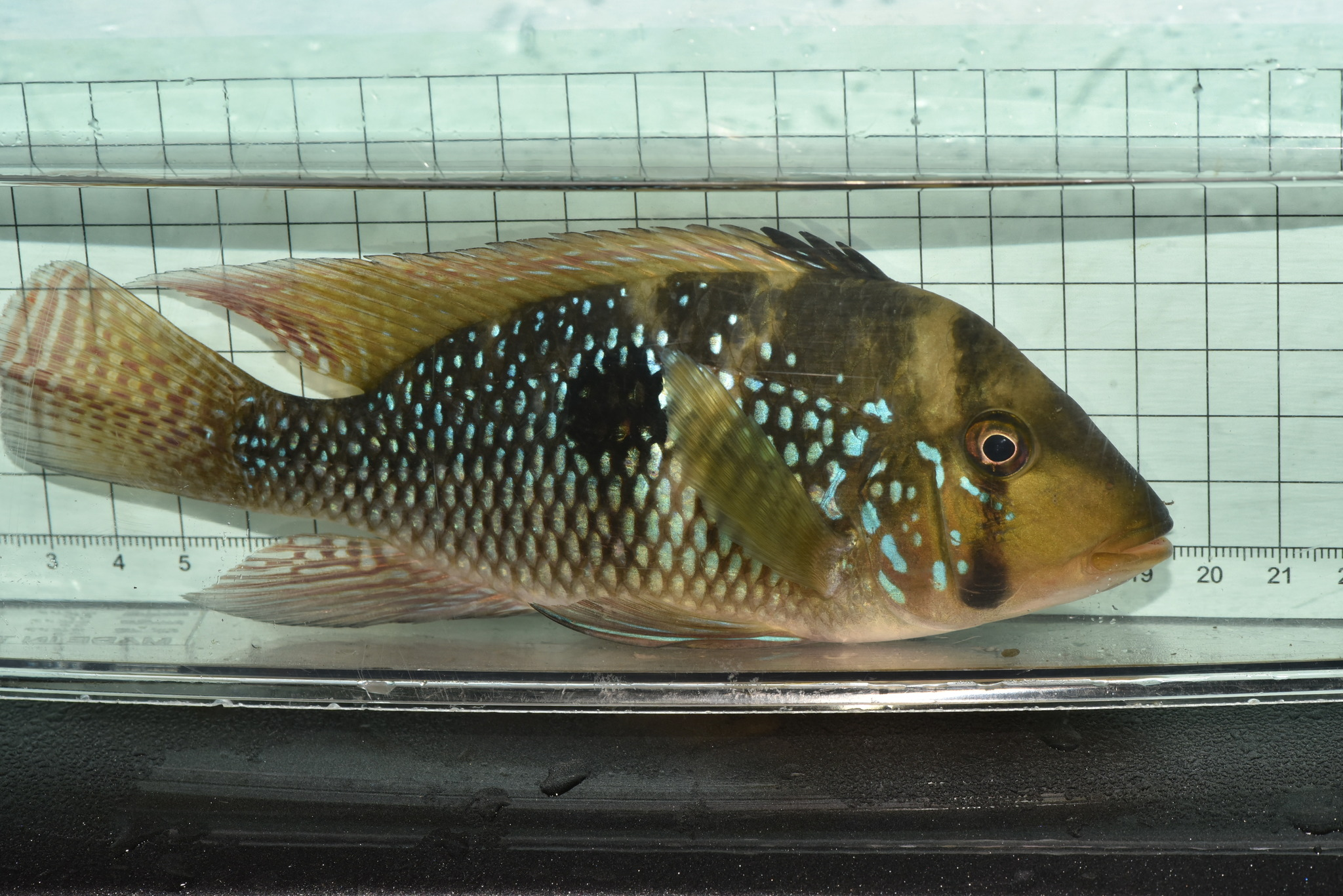

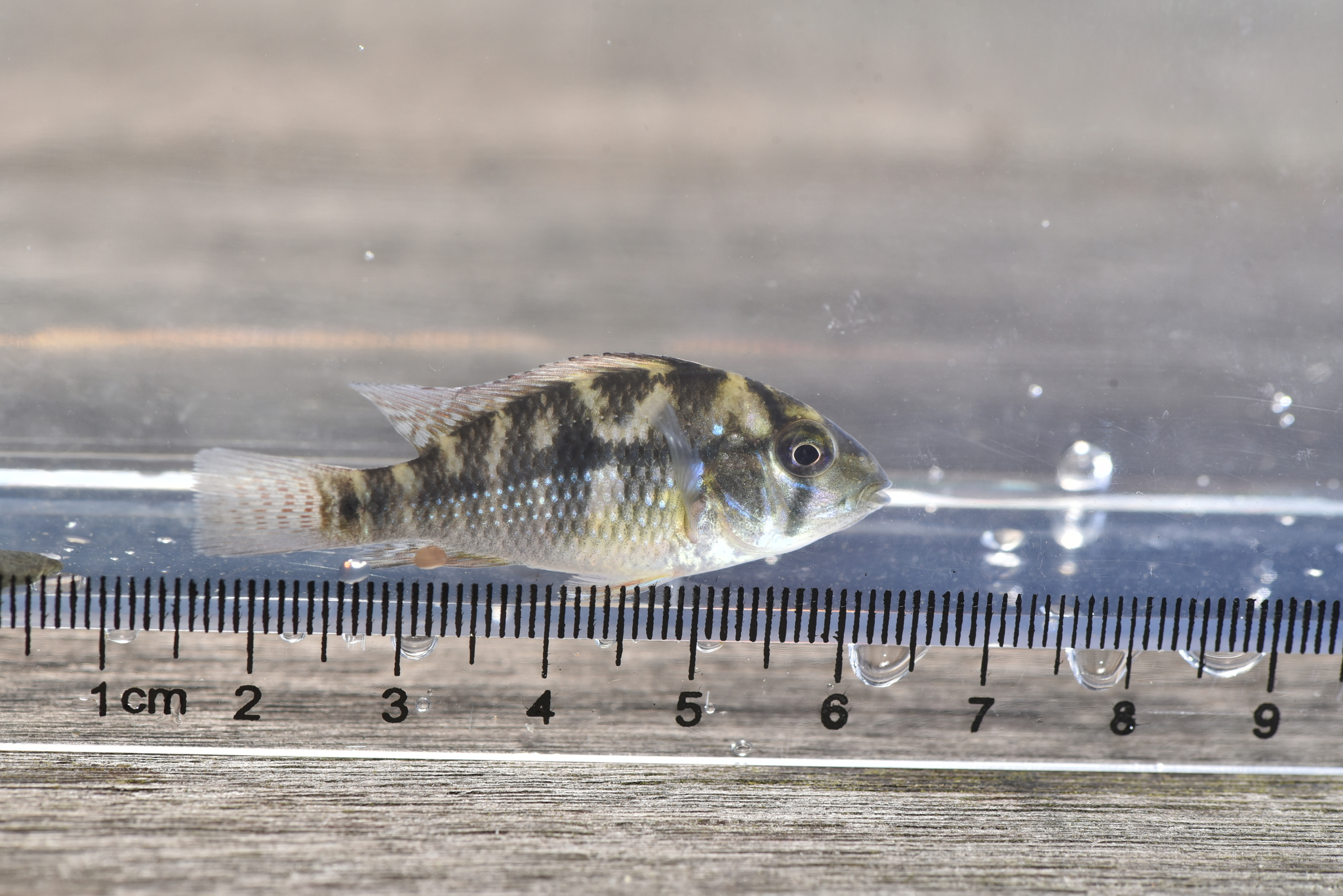

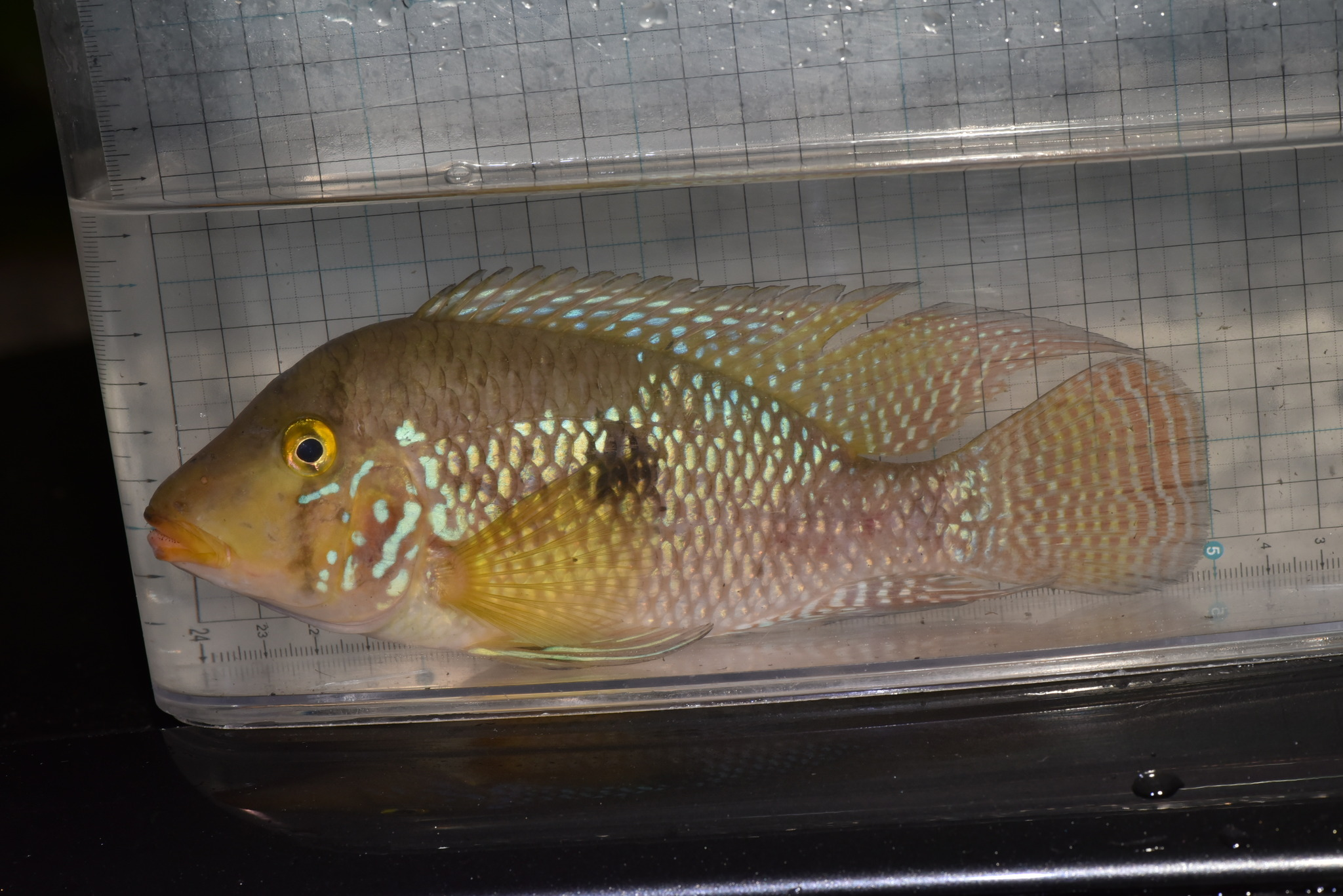

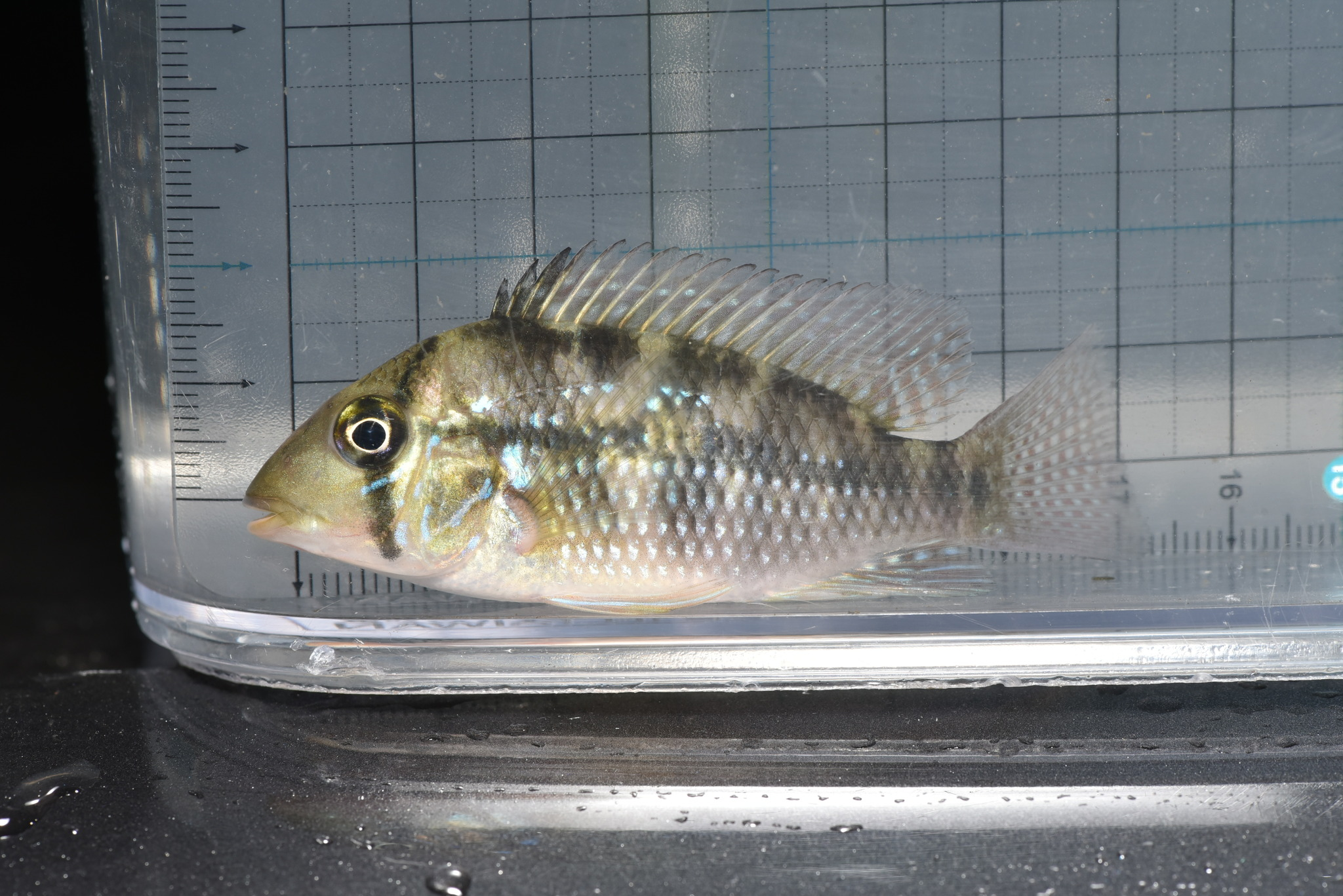

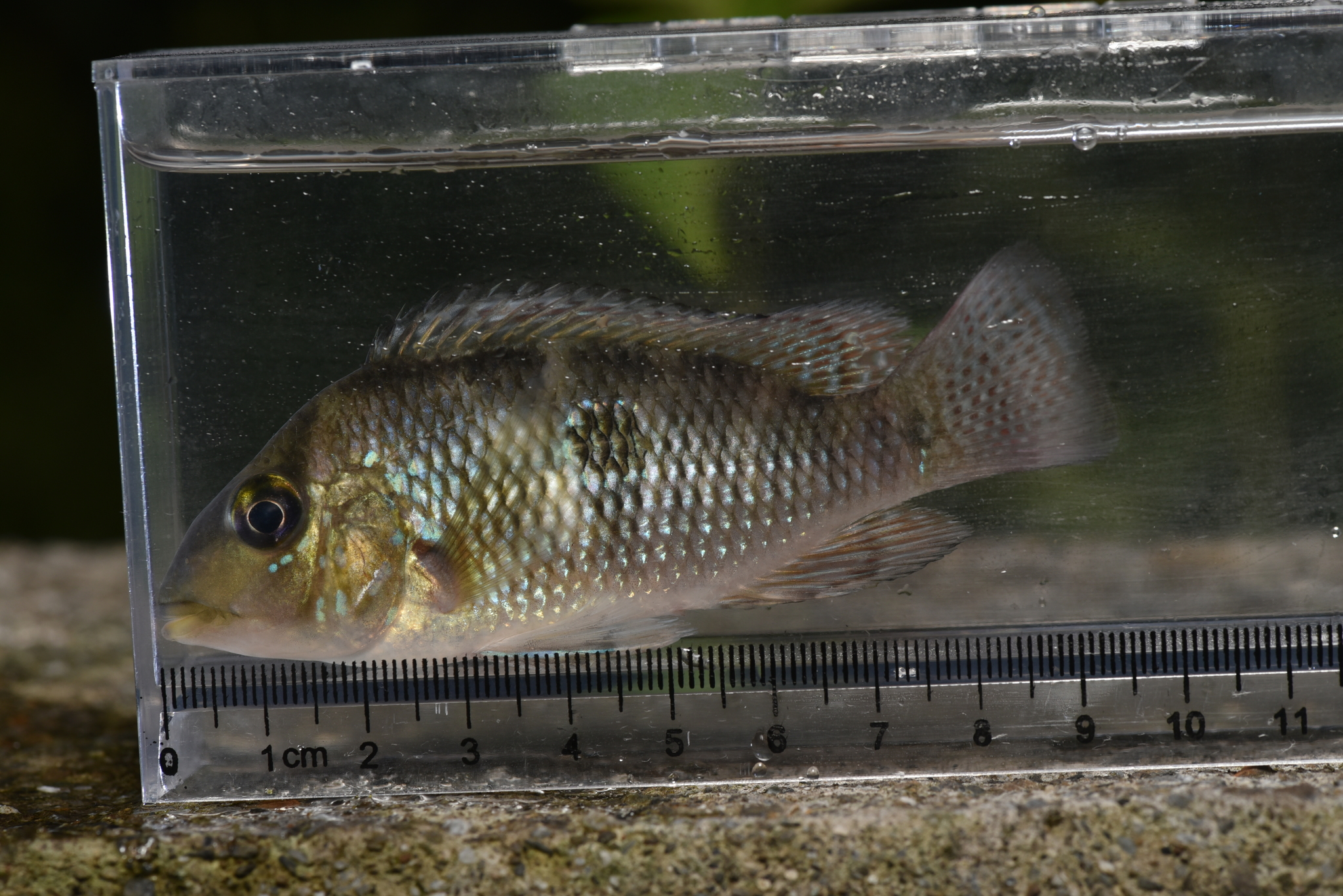

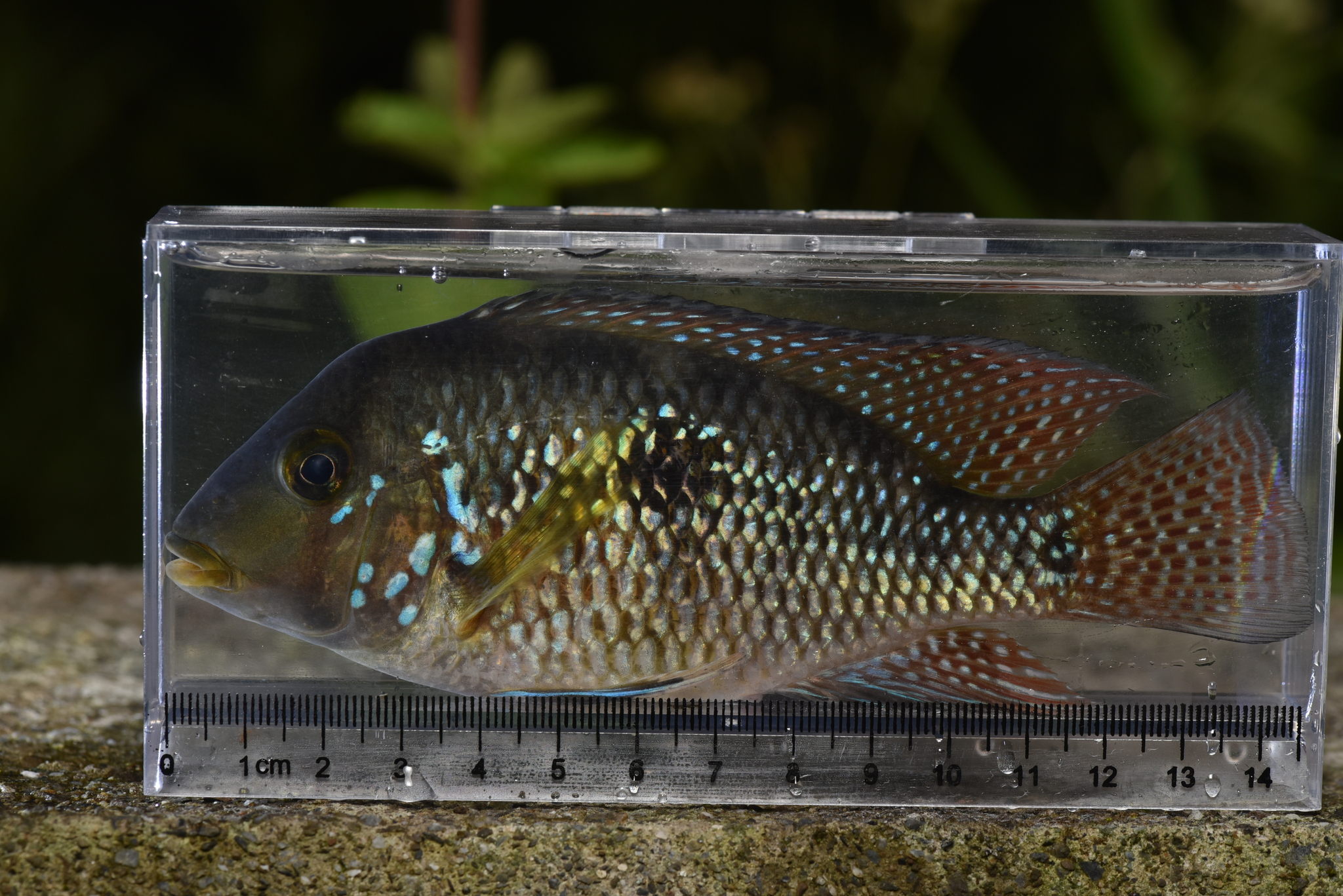

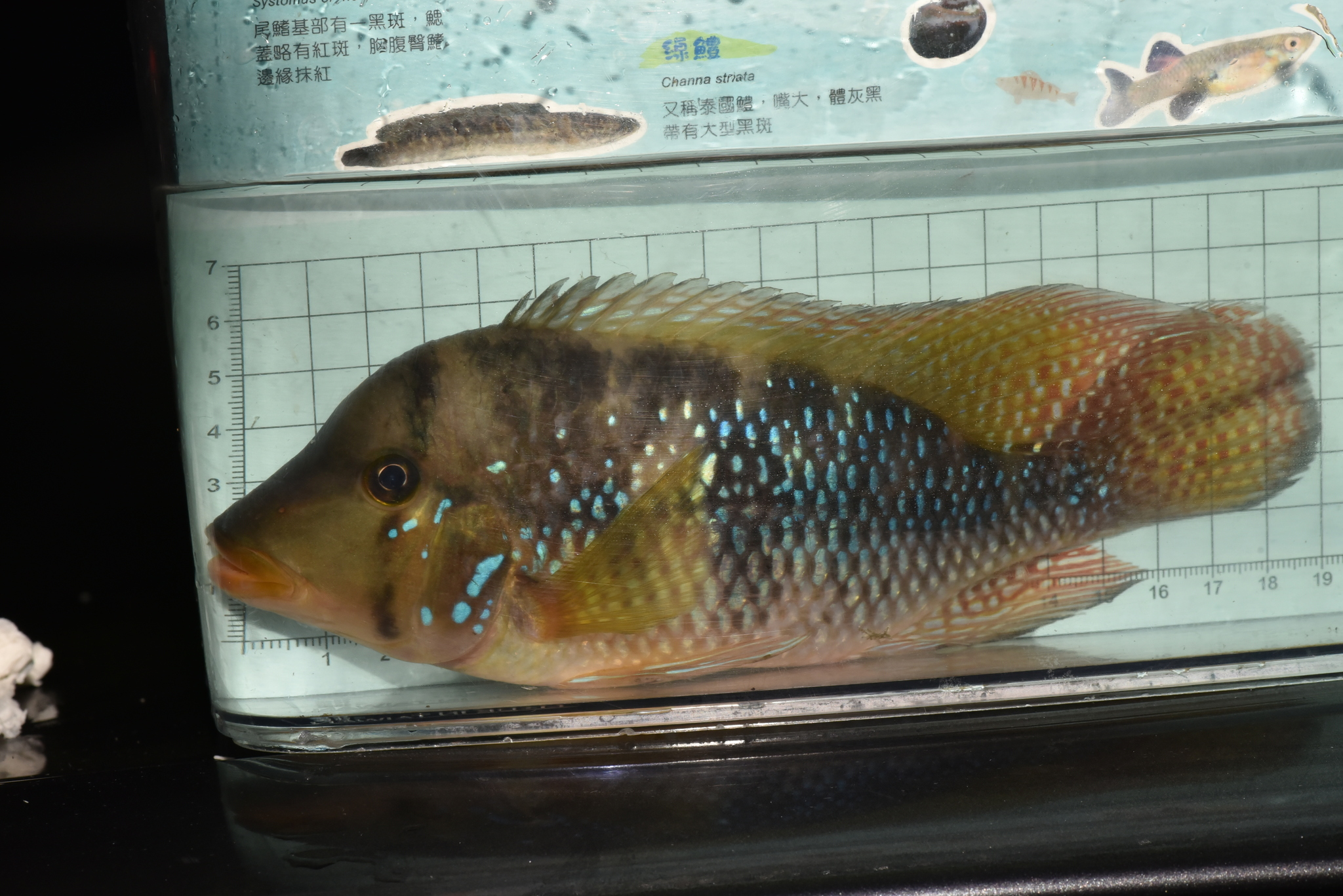
