= Geophagus neambi =

Scientific classification
- Domain: Eukaryota
- Kingdom: Animalia
- Phylum: Chordata
- Class: Actinopterygii
- Order: Cichliformes
- Family: Cichlidae
- Genus: Geophagus
- Species: G. neambi

Binomial name
- Geophagus neambi Lucinda, Lucena, & Assis, 2010

Brazilian fish species

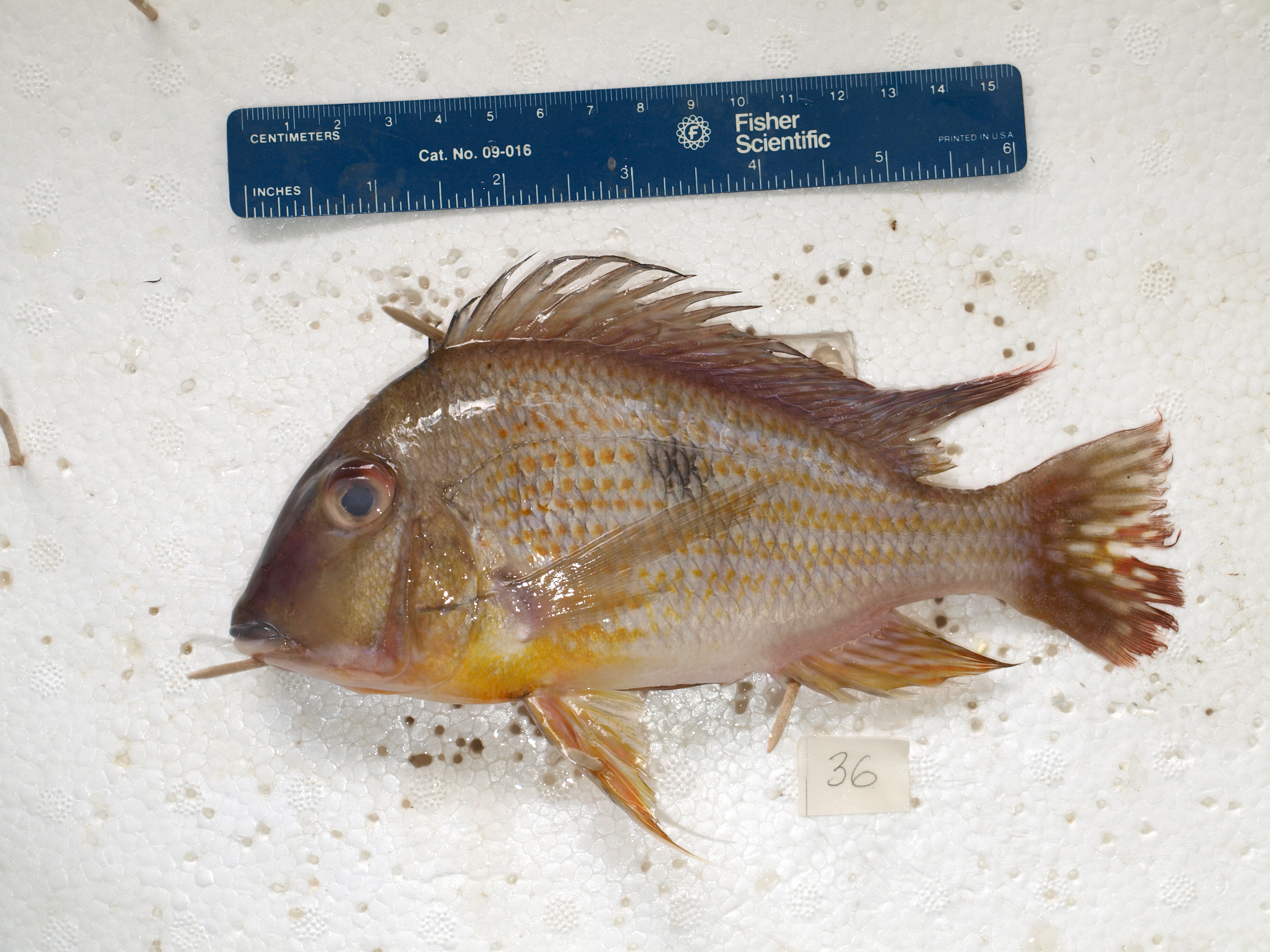
Geophagus neambi style fish

Geophagus neambi is a Geophagini cichlid native to the Tocantins River drainage in Brazil.

== Etymology ==
The fish is named in honor of Núcleo de Estudos Ambientais (Neamb), of the Universidade Federal do Tocantins (Brazil), for its continuing effort in the study of the rio Tocantins ichthyofauna.
