= Neduba propsti =

Scientific classification
- Kingdom: Animalia
- Phylum: Arthropoda
- Class: Insecta
- Order: Orthoptera
- Suborder: Ensifera
- Family: Tettigoniidae
- Genus: Neduba
- Species: N. propsti

Binomial name
- Neduba propsti Rentz & Weissmann, 1981

Species of cricket-like animal

Neduba propsti, known generally as the Catalina shield-back cricket or Propst's shieldback, is a species of shield-backed katydid in the family Tettigoniidae. It is found in North America.
