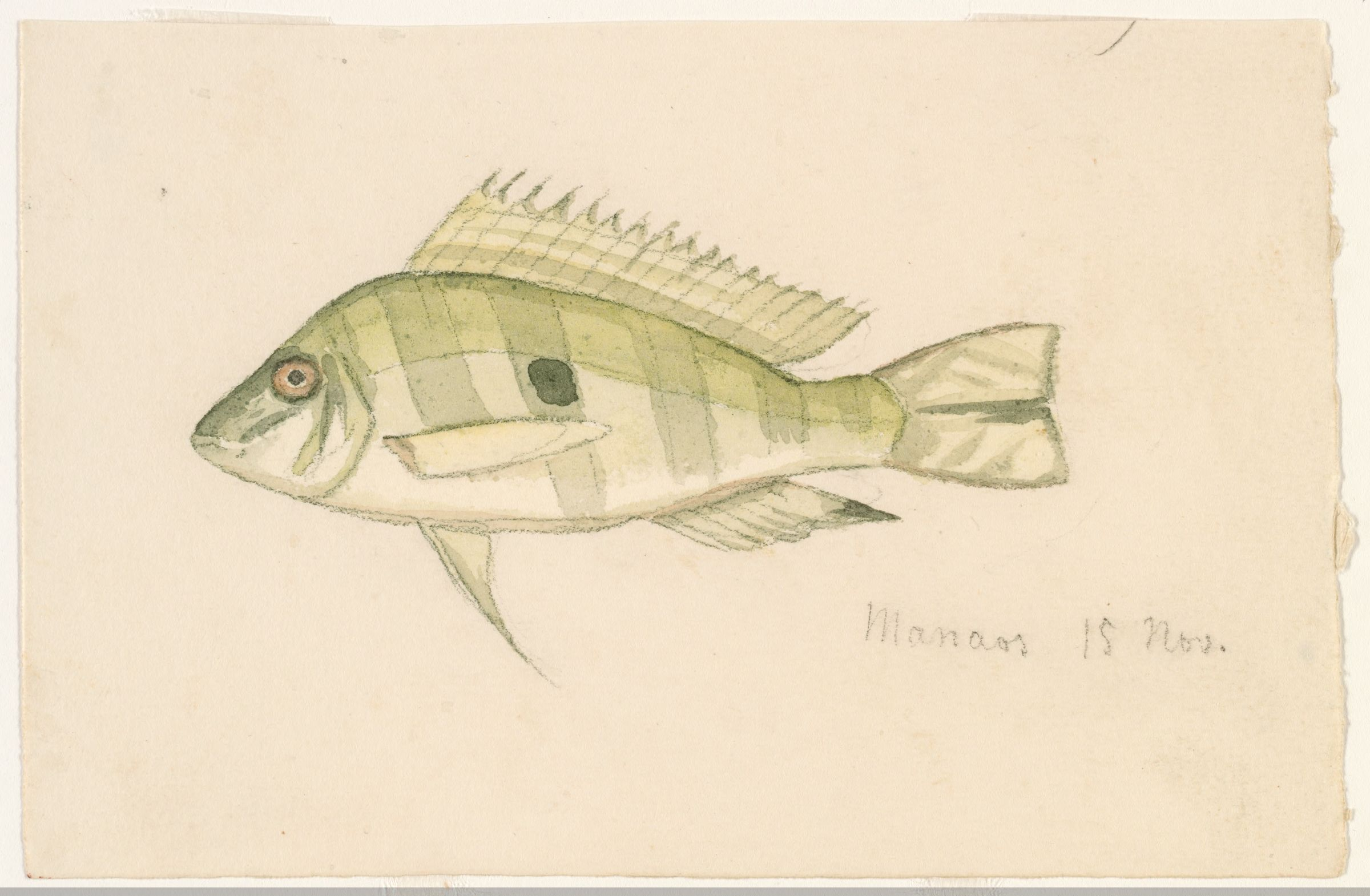
- An 1865 watercolor painting of geophagus altifrons from Manaus by Jacques Burkhardt

Scientific classification
- Kingdom: Animalia
- Phylum: Chordata
- Class: Actinopterygii
- Order: Cichliformes
- Family: Cichlidae
- Genus: Geophagus
- Species: G. altifrons

Binomial name
- Geophagus altifrons Heckel, 1840

= Geophagus altifrons =

Species of fish

Geophagus altifrons are a freshwater eartheater cichlid, native to the Amazon River Basin, Brazil. It is also commonly known as the threadfin eartheater or the surinam eartheater.

Introduced to Singapore and considered an invasive species, it thrives in slow-moving streams and reservoirs, where it works as a sand sifter in most environments like most Geophagus species. Its ecological impact on its adopted habitat is still unknown.

A member of the family Cichlidae, it can grow up to 22.5 cm (8.9 in) in standard length. It is benthophagous by nature, taking mouthfuls of substrate (hence its common name) and sifting for edible items, with the remaining materials being expelled via the mouth and gill openings. It prefers clear and blackwater environments as opposed to turbid white waters.

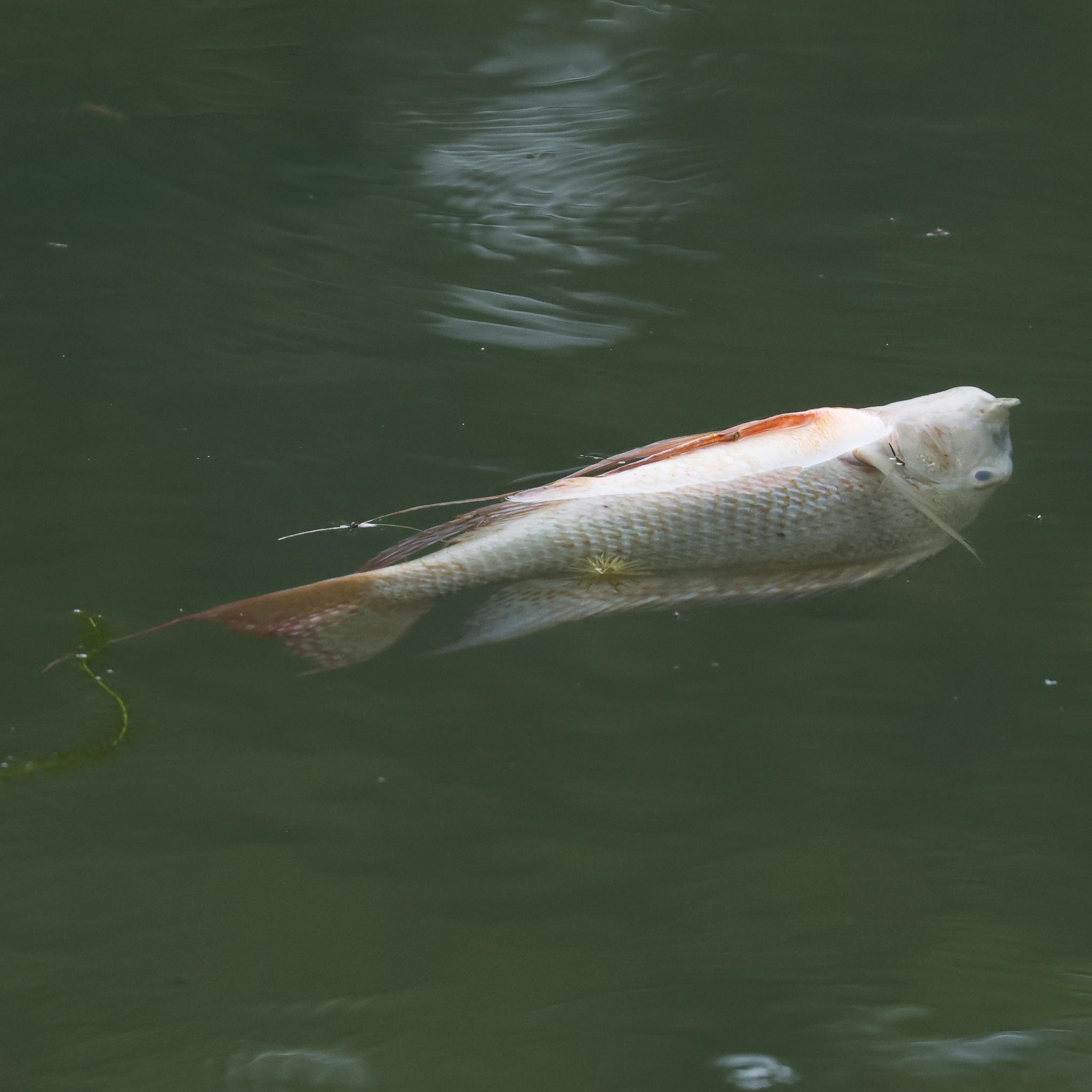
Deceased geophagus altifrons found in the Central Water Catchment in Singapore

Geophagus altifrons are one of the most common species of Geophagus found in the pet trade, often wild caught and falsely labeled as Geophagus surinamensis within the hobby.

== See also ==
- List of freshwater aquarium fish species
