= Bombus steindachneri =

Conservation status
- Endangered (IUCN 3.1)

Scientific classification
- Kingdom: Animalia
- Phylum: Arthropoda
- Class: Insecta
- Order: Hymenoptera
- Family: Apidae
- Genus: Bombus
- Subgenus: Fervidobombus
- Species: B. steindachneri

Binomial name
- Bombus steindachneri Handlirsch, 1888

Species of bee

Bombus steindachneri is a species of bumblebee. It is endemic to Mexico.

This bee lives in pine-oak forests, thorn forest, and tropical dry forest habitat. It occurs at sea level to elevations around 2600 meters. It is active year-round.

This is an endangered species on the IUCN Red List. Threats include habitat loss to agriculture, including cattle ranching, and associated chemical use. It is also impacted by urbanization, mining, and loss of the native flora.
