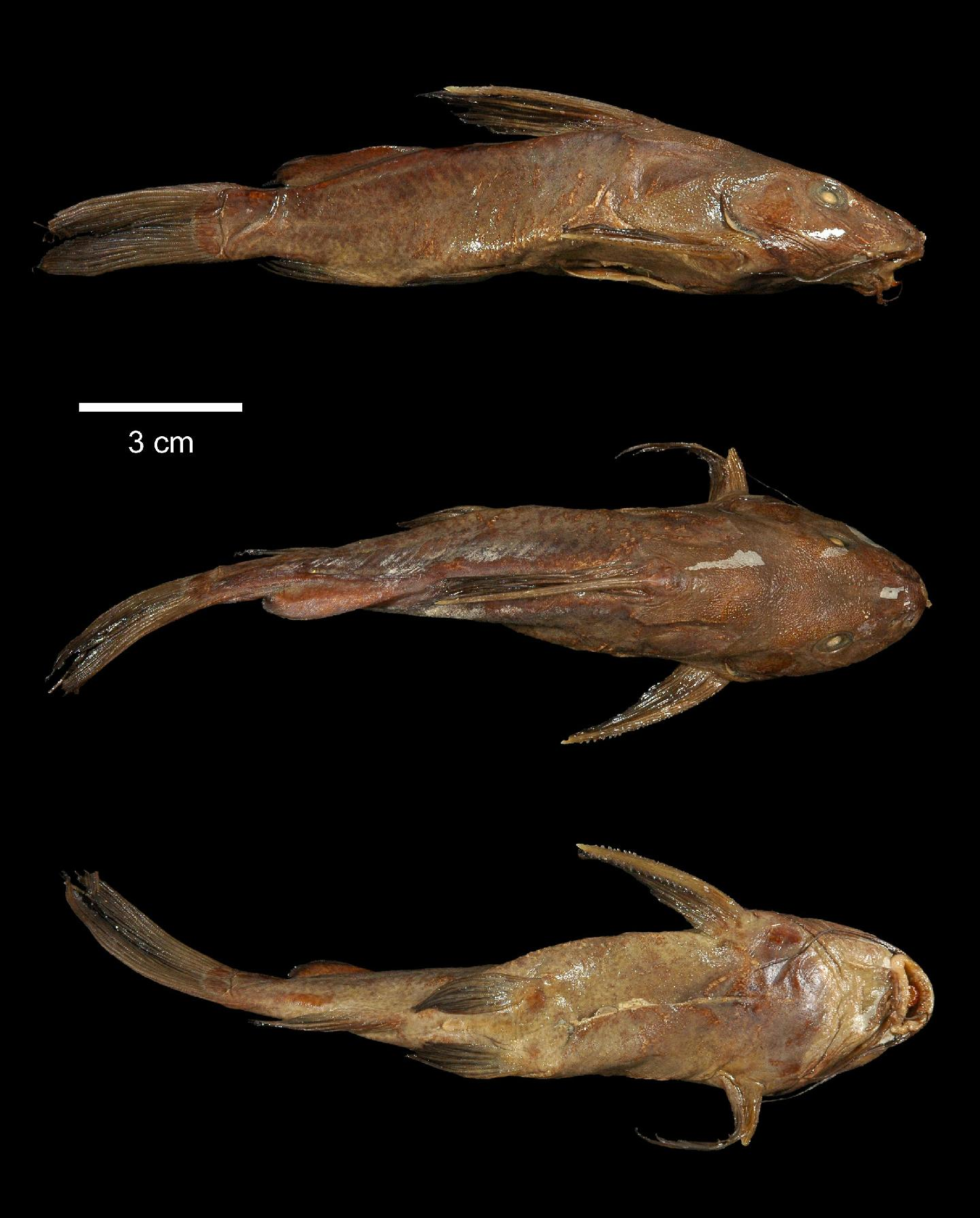

Conservation status
- Least Concern (IUCN 3.1)

Scientific classification
- Domain: Eukaryota
- Kingdom: Animalia
- Phylum: Chordata
- Class: Actinopterygii
- Order: Siluriformes
- Family: Mochokidae
- Genus: Synodontis
- Species: S. steindachneri

Binomial name
- Synodontis steindachneri Boulenger, 1913

= Synodontis steindachneri =

Species of fish

Synodontis steindachneri is a species of upside-down catfish endemic to Cameroon where it occurs in the Nyong River. This species grows to a length of 20.3 centimetres (8.0 in) TL.
