= Neduba steindachneri =

Scientific classification
- Domain: Eukaryota
- Kingdom: Animalia
- Phylum: Arthropoda
- Class: Insecta
- Order: Orthoptera
- Suborder: Ensifera
- Family: Tettigoniidae
- Tribe: Nedubini
- Genus: Neduba
- Species: N. steindachneri

Binomial name
- Neduba steindachneri (Herman, 1874)

Species of cricket-like animal

Neduba steindachneri, or Steindachner's shieldback, is a species of shield-backed katydid in the family Tettigoniidae. It is found in North America. Its type locality is Fox Island, Washington.
