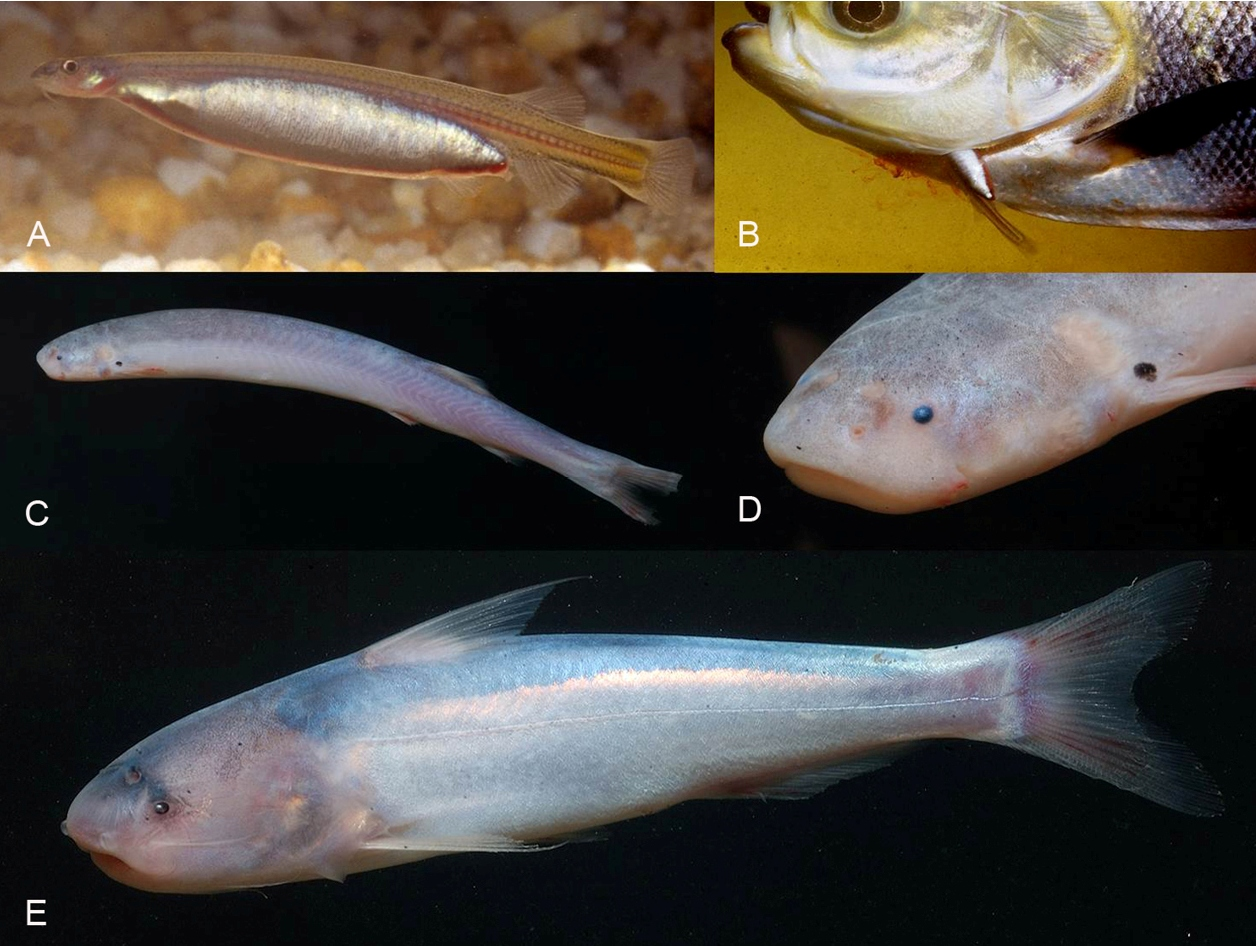
- Three species of catfish commonly called "candiru" (Note: A & B: Vandellia cirrhosa · C & D: Pareiodon microps · E: Cetopsis coecutiens)

Scientific classification
- Kingdom: Animalia
- Phylum: Chordata
- Class: Actinopterygii
- Division: Teleostei
- (unranked): Otophysi
- Order: Siluriformes

Groups included
- See text

= Candiru (fish) =

Small-bodied catfish of concern to human health

Candiru are South American catfish of a parasitic or scavenging niche. The species known as candiru are not necessarily closely related.

== Species ==
Cetopsidae (whale catfish)

- Cetopsis (whale candiru/candiru-açu; in part)
  - Cetopsis candiru
  - Cetopsis coecutiens

Trichomycteridae (pencil catfish)

- Stegophilinae
  - Acanthopoma annectens
  - Pareiodon microps
- Tridentinae
  - Tridensimilis brevis
- Vandelliinae (blood-feeding/vampire catfish)
  - Paracanthopoma spp. Type: Paracanthopoma parva
  - Paravandellia spp. Type: Paravandellia oxyptera
  - Plectrochilus spp. Type: Plectrochilus machadoi
  - Vandellia spp., Type: Vandellia cirrhosa ("true" candiru)
  - "Human-biting candiru"

=== Taxonomy ===
Phylogeny of Siluriformes based on Betancur et al. 2017, Trichomycteridae based on Fernández and Schaefer 2009, and Cetopsidae based on De Pinna et al. 2007.

- Siluriformes Catfish
  - Loricaroidei
    - - Nematogenyidae
      - Trichomycteridae
        ⊞
        ⊟
        - Trichomycterus areola
        - - Trichomycterus corduvensis
          - - Trichomycterus guianensis
            - - - Tridens sp.
                - - Sarcoglanis simplex
                  - Typhlobelus guacamaya
              - - Vandelliinae "True" candiru
                  - Paravandellia oxyptera
                  - - Plectrochilus sp.
                    - - Vandellia sanguinea
                      - Vandellia cirrhosa
                - Stegophilinae
                  - Haemomaster
                  - - Ochmacanthus
                    - - Homodiaetus
                      - - Megalocentor
                        - - Parastegophilus
                          - - - Pseudostegophilus nemurus
                              - - Apomatoceros alleni
                                - Henonemus punctatus
                            - - Acanthopoma annectens
                              - Pareiodon microps
    - - Callichthyidae
      - - Astroblepidae
        - Loricariidae
  - - Diplomystoidei
      - Diplomystidae
    - Siluroidei
      - - Cetopsoidea
          ⊞Cetopsidae
          ⊟
          - Helogenes
          - - Cetopsidium
            - - Denticetopsis
              - - Paracetopsis
                - Cetopsis
                  - C. gobioides, C. orinoco, C. othonops, etc.
                  - - C. amphiloxa
                    - - C. motatanensis
                      - - C. baudoensis
                        - - C. fimbriata
                          - - C. oliverai
                            - Candiru‑açu
                              - C. candiru
                              - C. coecutiens
      - - Derived catfish
          Siluroidea, Arioidea, Ictaluroidea, Doradoidea, Pimelodoidea, etc.

== Relation to humans ==
Candiru species are of medical importance to people inhabiting the areas where they are native, such as the Amazon basin. The Cetopsis candiru-açu, as well as P. microps, are well known for their scavenging habit, boring into carrion and cadavers that drift downriver. Their combined action, together with that of the vulture catfish, is able to deflesh an 80 kilograms (180 lb) cadaver within half an hour. The bites of whale candiru are strong enough to leave marks upon human bone; circular marks are often visible on the bones of the animal fed upon. Occasionally, Cetopsis may also attack live humans, though the cause of such attacks is still unknown. The undescribed human-biting candiru was first documented while feeding on blood from a boy's back, which is noted to be not dissimilar from the method other vandelliines use to feed off of fish blood.

=== Alleged attacks on humans ===
A long-standing claim about candiru is their supposed propensity to insert themselves into human urethras or other orifices in an apparent attempt to parasitize; this alleged ability has been described in ethnological reports dating back to the 19th century. However, these accounts of human parasitism are often biased, arising from "imprecise, second- and third-hand accounts, misconceptions, and folk tales"; which lead to the spread of imprecise or dubious claims that may even be reported in scientific resources; there are no credible reports of candiru parasitizing human urethras.

Vandelliines are characterized by their hematophagy, or their habit of feeding on blood. Their parasitic habit on other fish is well documented, with Plectrochilus machadoi specimens found embedded in the belly of a surubí after apparently burrowing through its body wall, and species of Paracanthopoma such as P. parva boring into the flanks of armored Doras catfish, piramutaba, and gilded catfish (though these are apparently instances of phoretic "hitchiking"), and all species in the subfamily are known to enter the gill cavity of larger fish (such as characins, catfish, or stingrays) to latch onto the branchial artery which connects the gills to the heart; the host's arterial pressure pumping the candiru's stomach full of blood. Despite this known behavior, they may not comfortably fit the stricter definition of parasitism, leading some authors to use terms such as semi-parasitism, or more recently; micropredation, where the parasite is not relying upon a single host species or individual. Whatever the case, these fish are highly specialized hematophagic parasites, thought to possess adaptations that enable them to tolerate high iron content (which is highly oxidative to DNA and proteins), mechanisms to obtain vitamin B lacking in blood meals, and an anti-coagulative agent to facilitate blood feeding and/or digestion.

Candiru reputed to parasitize humans include T. brevis, and most commonly, Vandellia cirrhosa, which is the type species of the type genus of its subfamily. V. cirrhosa were presumed to seek out urea excreted out of a potential host's gills, which would make them susceptible to following streams of urine to its source, the urethra, though experimental evidence disproves this; a 2001 study shows that these fish actually hunt by sight (the species studied being Vandellia cf. plazaii) and displayed no attraction to urine (or other potential chemical attractants such as ammonia, fish slime, or amino acids) at all. Despite their names, candiru-açu are not parasitic on any animal.

Organisations such as the Florida Fish and Wildlife Conservation Commission (FFWCC) and Texas Parks and Wildlife Department (TPWD) restricts the possession of all species of Trichomycteridae ("Parasitic Catfishes"), which limits the possession of all listed species to research, educational exhibition, aquaculture, and for control or eradication purposes only, and further limits the species eligible for these purposes.

==== Historical accounts ====
The earliest published report of candiru attacking a human host comes from German biologist C. F. P. von Martius in 1829. The biologist never actually observed this; rather, von Martius was told about it by an interpreter relaying the speech of the native people of the area, who reported that men would tie ligatures around their penises while going into the river to prevent this from happening. Other sources also suggest that other tribes in the area used various forms of protective coverings for their genitals while bathing, though it was also suggested that these were to prevent bites from piranha. Martius also speculated that the fish were attracted by the "odor" of urine.

Another report, from French naturalist Francis de Castelnau in 1855, relates an allegation by local Araguay fisherman, saying that it is dangerous to urinate in the river as the fish "springs out of the water and penetrates into the urethra by ascending the length of the liquid column." While Castelnau himself dismissed this claim as "absolutely preposterous", and the fluid mechanics of such a maneuver defy the laws of physics, it remains one of the more stubborn myths about the candiru. It has been suggested this claim evolved out of the real observation that certain species of fish in the Amazon will gather at the surface near the point where a urine stream enters, having been attracted by the noise and agitation of the water.

In 1836, Eduard Poeppig documented a statement by a local physician in Pará, known only as Dr. Lacerda, who offered an eyewitness account of a case where a candiru had entered a human orifice. However, it was lodged in a native woman's vagina, rather than a male urethra. He relates that the fish was extracted after external and internal application of the juice from a Xagua plant (believed to be a name for Genipa americana). Another account was documented by biologist George A. Boulenger from a Brazilian physician, named Dr. Bach, who had examined a man and several boys whose penises had been amputated. Bach believed this was a remedy performed because of parasitism by candiru, but he was merely speculating, as he did not speak his patients' language. American biologist Eugene Willis Gudger noted that the area which the patients were from did not have candiru in its rivers, and suggested the amputations were much more likely the result of having been attacked by piranha.

In 1891, naturalist Paul Le Cointe provides a rare first-hand account of a candiru entering a human body, and like Lacerda's account, it involved the fish being lodged in the vaginal canal, not the urethra. Le Cointe supposedly removed the fish himself, by pushing it forward to disengage the spines, turning it around and removing it head-first.

However, the veracity of both Le Cointe's and Poeppig's accounts are questionable, due to a trend of Europeans from various careers residing in Brazil including scientists, "explorers, medical men, and missionaries" regularly using exaggerated accounts of native people to advance their economic and social status through writing and building rapport with others with similar positions.

Gudger, in 1930, noted there have been several other cases reported wherein the fish was said to have entered the vaginal canal, but not a single case of a candiru entering the anus was ever documented. According to Gudger, this lends credence to the unlikelihood of the fish entering the male urethra, based on the comparatively small opening that would accommodate only the most immature members of the species.

The 1991 paper "Candirú: Amazonian parasitic catfish" documents various means of defence and treatment against candiru parasitism, such as urinary protectors and herbal remedies. The paper claims a tight-fitting bathing suit is proof against them, and vitamin C "megadose therapy" softens the candiru's fin spines enough to excrete the fish.

==== Modern cases ====
To date, there is only one documented case of a candiru entering a human urethra, which took place in Itacoatiara, Brazil, in 1997. In this incident, the victim (a 23-year-old man named Silvio Barbossa, also known as "F.B.C.") claimed a candiru "jumped" from the water into his urethra as he urinated while thigh-deep in a river. After traveling to Manaus on 28 October 1997, the victim underwent a two-hour urological surgery by Dr. Anoar Samad to remove the fish from his body.

In 1999, American marine biologist Stephen Spotte traveled to Brazil to investigate this particular incident in detail. He recounts the events of his investigation in his book Candiru: Life and Legend of the Bloodsucking Catfishes. Spotte met Dr. Samad in person and interviewed him at his practice and home. Samad gave him photos, the original VHS tape of the cystoscopy procedure, and the actual fish's body preserved in formalin as his donation to the National Institute of Amazonian Research. Spotte and his colleague Paulo Petry took these materials and examined them at the institute, comparing them with Samad's formal paper. While Spotte did not overtly express any conclusions as to the veracity of the incident, he did remark on several observations that were suspicious about the claims of the patient and/or Samad himself.

- According to Samad, the patient claimed "the fish had darted out of the water, up the urine stream, and into his urethra." While this is the most popularly known legendary trait of the candiru, according to Spotte it has been known conclusively to be a myth for more than a century, as it is impossible because of simple fluid physics.
- The documentation and specimen provided indicate a fish that was 133.5 mm in length and had a head with a diameter of 11.5 mm. Prying the urethra open to this extent would have required significant force. The candiru has no appendages or other apparatus that would have been necessary to accomplish this, and if it were leaping out of the water as the patient claimed, it would not have had sufficient leverage to force its way inside.
- Samad's paper claims the fish must have been attracted by the urine. This belief about the fish has been held for centuries, but was discredited in 2001. While this was merely speculation on Samad's part based on the prevailing scientific knowledge at the time, it somewhat erodes the patient's story by eliminating the motivation for the fish to have attacked him in the first place.
- Samad claimed the fish had "chewed" its way through the ventral wall of the urethra into the patient's scrotum. Spotte notes that the candiru does not possess the right teeth or strong enough dentition to have been capable of this. Additionally, the fish would most likely have died before it could have chewed even a somewhat large part of what was needed to reach it.
- Samad claimed he had to snip the candiru's grasping spikes off to extract it, yet the specimen provided had all its spikes intact.
- The cystoscopy video depicts traveling into a tubular space (presumed to be the patient's urethra) containing the fish's carcass and then pulling it out backward through the urethral opening, something that would have been almost impossible with the fish's spikes intact.

When subsequently interviewed, Spotte stated that even if a person were to urinate while "submerged in a stream where candiru live", the odds of that person being attacked by candiru are "(a)bout the same as being struck by lightning while simultaneously being eaten by a shark."
