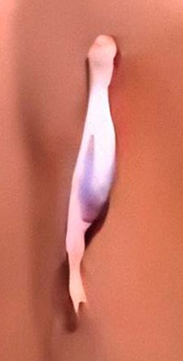
- A human-biting candiru latched onto a boy's upper back

Scientific classification
- Kingdom: Animalia
- Phylum: Chordata
- Class: Actinopterygii
- Order: Siluriformes
- Family: Trichomycteridae
- Subfamily: Vandelliinae
- Genus: Undescribed

Binomial name
- Undescribed; gen. et sp. nov.

= Human-biting candiru =

Undescribed species of catfish

The "human-biting candiru" is an undescribed species of catfish belonging to the subfamily Vandelliinae, part of the pencil catfishes. It has not yet been described; a holotype has not yet been studied and compared by ichthyologists, so this species still lacks a scientific name.

It was first recognized after one latched onto a boy's back, presumably as he was swimming, and the attempts to remove the fish from the boy's back were subsequently recorded. While feeding, the fish clamps onto its hosts using specialized teeth driven by powerful jaw muscles, and possibly supplemented by interopercular spines. After being forcibly removed, the injury bled profusely, and the shape of the wound was noted to be similar to those inflicted on the arteries of host fish by the closely related candiru Vandellia cirrhosa.

"Candiru" is a blanket term used to describe several species of Amazonian catfish; apart from the parasitic V. cirrhosa and the unnamed human-biting candiru, there are other parasites such as Pareiodon microps, and the two species of Cetopsis whale candiru which are scavengers of river-borne carrion, these being C. candiru and C. coecutiens. Some species of candiru are important in a medical context, especially the whale candiru as they often scavenge river-borne human corpses, though there exists significant bias arising from "imprecision, second- and third-hand accounts, misconceptions, and folk tales"; these lead to the spread of imprecise or dubious claims that may even be reported in scientific resources.
