= Tridens vitreus =

Scientific classification
- Kingdom: Animalia
- Phylum: Chordata
- Class: Actinopterygii
- Order: Siluriformes
- Family: Trichomycteridae
- Genus: Tridens
- Species: T. vitreus

Binomial name
- Tridens vitreus Henschel, Ohara & W. Costa, 2023

Species of fish

Tridens vitreus is a species of freshwater ray-finned fishes belonging to the family Trichomycteridae, the pencil and parasitic catfishes, and the subfamily Tridentinae, the pygmy pencil catfishes. This catfish is found in Brazil. It was first described in 2023, with another species, T. chicomendesi.

== Description ==
The species is classified based on the fins and vertebrae.
