= Tridens chicomendesi =

Scientific classification
- Kingdom: Animalia
- Phylum: Chordata
- Class: Actinopterygii
- Order: Siluriformes
- Family: Trichomycteridae
- Genus: Tridens
- Species: T. chicomendesi

Binomial name
- Tridens chicomendesi Henschel & W. Costa, 2023

Species of fish

Tridens chicomendesi is a species of freshwater ray-finned fishes belonging to the family Trichomycteridae, the pencil and parasitic catfishes, and the subfamily Tridentinae, the pygmy pencil catfishes. This catfish is found in Brazil. It was first described in 2023, with another species, T. vitreus.

== Description ==
Like the species T. vitreus, T. chicomendesi is mainly classified based on the fins and vertebrae.
