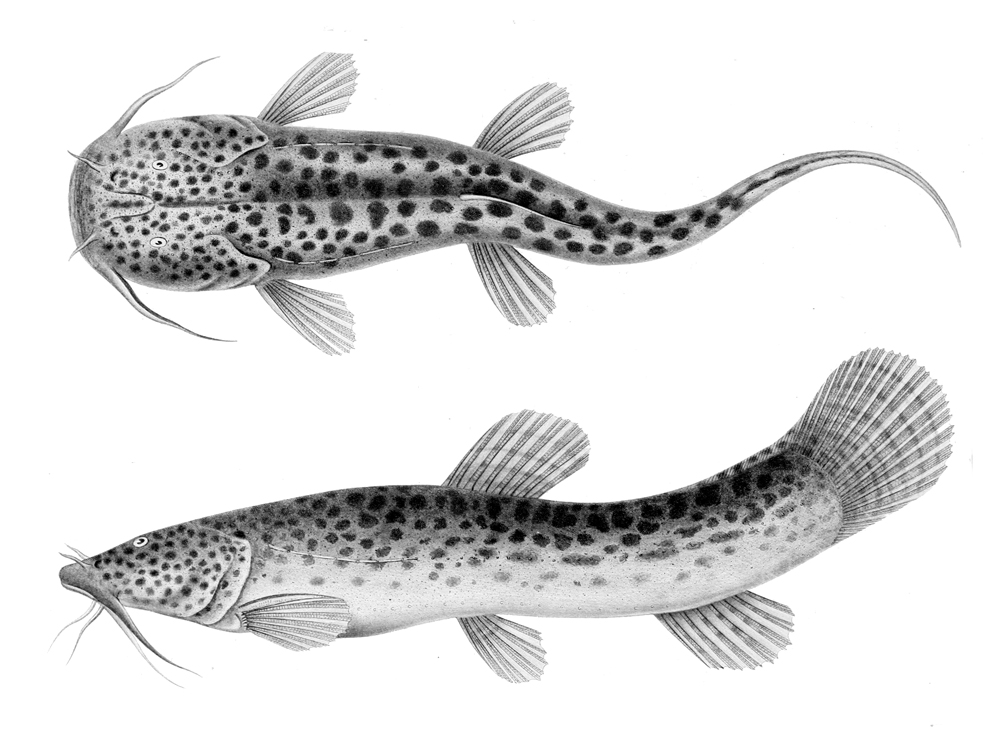

Conservation status
- Critically Endangered (IUCN 3.1)

Scientific classification
- Kingdom: Animalia
- Phylum: Chordata
- Class: Actinopterygii
- Order: Siluriformes
- Suborder: Loricarioidei
- Family: Nematogenyidae
- Genus: Nematogenys
- Species: N. inermis

Binomial name
- Nematogenys inermis Guichenot, 1848

Synonyms
- Trichomycterus inermis Guichenot, 1848; Nematogenys nigricans Philippi, 1866; Nematogenys pallidus Philippi, 1866

= Nematogenys inermis =

Species of fish

Nematogenys inermis is a species of mountain catfish, the only extant species in the family Nematogenyidae. This species is endemic to Chile, where it is found in fresh waters in central Chile. This species grows to a length of 40.7 cm (16.0 in) NG.

The body is naked (without scales) and elongated. The three pairs of barbels are the chin (mental) barbels, maxillary barbels, and nasal barbels. No adipose fin is present. The opercle lacks spines.

The Nematogenyidae and Trichomycteridae are sister groups that together form a clade sister to the families Callichthyidae, Scoloplacidae, Astroblepidae, and Loricariidae.

One extinct species, †Nematogenys cuivi, has been described in this genus.
