= Paracanthopoma parva =

Conservation status
- Least Concern (IUCN 3.1)

Scientific classification
- Kingdom: Animalia
- Phylum: Chordata
- Class: Actinopterygii
- Order: Siluriformes
- Family: Trichomycteridae
- Subfamily: Vandelliinae
- Genus: Paracanthopoma
- Species: P. parva

Binomial name
- Paracanthopoma parva Giltay, 1935

Species of fish

Paracanthopoma parva is a species of freshwater ray-finned fishes belonging to the family Trichomycteridae, the pencil and parasitic catfishes, and the subfamily Vandelliinae, the haematophagic catfishes. P. parva grows to about 2.7 centimetres (1.1 in) SL and is endemic to Brazil where it occurs in the Amazon and Essequibo River basins.

Paracanthopoma parva has been found on the gills of another species of giant catfish, Brachyplatystoma vaillantii. Species within the genus Paracanthopoma have the longest and most robust snout, and the longest and strongest dentary teeth among blood-feeding candirus, which fit their drilling needs. Riding on a giant host is advantageous for dispersal, no need to search for hosts to feed, and protection from predators. It is unlikely that Paracanthopoma takes blood from the tiny holes it drills in the skin; the areas these fish attach to have no large blood vessels to supply them with blood, and fish that have been riding are found only with trace amounts of blood in their digestive tracts. Also, most vandelliine candirus take blood from the gill region of their hosts.

An undescribed species of Paracanthopoma has been found to ride Zungaro zungaro catfish; their snouts were buried up to the eyes in the tough skin on the host's caudal and pectoral fins, as well as the base of the dorsal fin.
