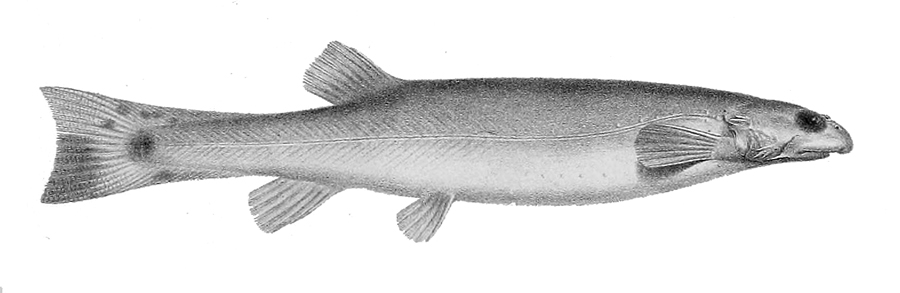
- Henonemus macrops

Scientific classification
- Kingdom: Animalia
- Phylum: Chordata
- Class: Actinopterygii
- Order: Siluriformes
- Family: Trichomycteridae
- Subfamily: Stegophilinae
- Genus: Henonemus; C. H. Eigenmann & Ward, 1907

Type species
- Stegophilus intermedius C. H. Eigenmann & R. S. Eigenmann, 1889

Synonyms
- Cobitiglanis Fowler, 1914

= Henonemus =

Genus of fishes

Henonemus is a genus of freshwater ray-finned fishes belonging to the family Trichomycteridae, the pencil and parasitic catfishes, and the subfamily Stegophilinae, the parasitic catfishes.. These fishes are found in South America.

== Taxonomy ==
Henonmemus was first proposed as a genus in 1907 by the American ichthyologists Carl H. Eigenmann and David Perkins Ward with Stegophilus intermedius, originally described by Carl H, and Rosa Smith Eigenmann in 1889 with its type locality given as "Goiaz", designated as its type species, as well as being the only species then in the genus. The monophyly of Henonemus was previously in doubt, leading to this genus being placed in synonymy with Stegophilus. Monophyly was argued for in 2006 and the genus was recognized in a 2007 checklist of catfishes. This genus is classified in the subfamily Stegophilinae, the parasitic catfishes, of the family Trichomycteridae, the pencil and parasitic catfishes, within the suborder Loricarioidei of the order Siluriformes.

== Species ==
Henonemus contains the following valid species:

- Henonemus intermedius (C. H. Eigenmann & Eigenmann, 1889)
- Henonemus macrops (Steindachner, 1882)
- Henonemus punctatus (Boulenger, 1887)
- Henonemus taxistigmus (Fowler, 1914)
- Henonemus triacanthopomus DoNascimiento & Provenzano, 2006

== Distribution ==
H. intermedius originates from the Araguaia River basin in Brazil. H. macrops and H. punctatus both are known from the Amazon River basin, the former from Brazil and the latter from Brazil, Ecuador, and Peru. H. taxistigmus inhabits the Rupununi River basin in Guyana. H. triacanthopomus has been collected in the Apure and Arauca Rivers and in Caño Macareo in the Orinoco Delta, but is probably distributed through the entire middle and lower reaches of the Orinoco River basin.

== Description ==
Fish of the genus Henonemus have an opercle with two odontodes (though H. triacanthopomus differs from other Henonemus in that there are three or four odontodes in specimens greater than 80 millimetres or 3.1 in SL) and the teeth of the most posterior row on the premaxilla and the dentary proximally turned to the midline then abruptly bent laterally in the distal half, and arranged in a compact band. They may grow about 4.1–9.4 centimetres (1.6–3.7 in) SL.
