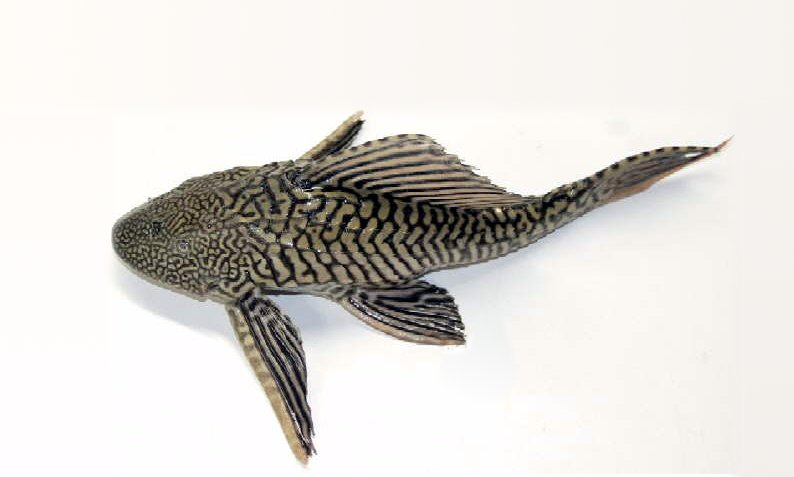
- Pterygoplichthys sp.

Scientific classification
- Kingdom: Animalia
- Phylum: Chordata
- Class: Actinopterygii
- Order: Siluriformes
- Suborder: Loricarioidei; Rafinesque, 1815

Families
- see text

= Loricarioidei =

Loricarioidei Temporal range: 58.5–0 Ma Late Paleocene–Present Possible Cenomanian record

Superfamily of fishes

Loricarioidei is a suborder of catfishes (order Siluriformes). It contains the six families Trichomycteridae, Nematogenyiidae, Callichthyidae, Scoloplacidae, Astroblepidae, and Loricariidae. Some schemes also include Amphiliidae. This superfamily, including Amphiliidae, includes about 156 genera and 1,187 species.

== Taxonomy ==
Loricarioidea was previously considered a part of Siluroidei, a clade of all catfishes excluding Diplomystidae. In Nelson, 2006, this grouping is sister to the superfamily Sisoroidea. However, in a recent molecular analysis, it was determined that the suborder Loricarioidei (not including Amphiliidae) is sister to a group including Diplomystidae and Siluroidei. Amphiliidae, in this analysis, was found to be much more closely related to Mochokidae or Malapteruridae. It is disputed whether Loricarioidea or Diplomystidae are the most basal group of catfish, with molecular studies favoring the former while morphological studies favor the latter.

The earliest known definitive loricaroid is the callichthyid Corydoras revelatus from the Late Paleocene of Argentina. Molecular estimates suggest that the main radiation of the superfamily occurred during the Late Cretaceous. The putative Cenomanian member Afrocascudo, discovered from the Cenomanian age of the Late Cretaceous in North Africa (Kem Kem Group), was initially described as the earliest loricariid catfish in 2024, which may extend the fossil record of Loricariidae (and Siluriformes as a whole). However, this taxon might represent a juvenile obaichthyid lepisosteiform, possibly a junior synonym of Obaichthys, though this has been disputed based on the complete ossification of the bones indicating full maturity and the absence of important holostean characters.

Loricarioidea is currently diagnosed by the derived presence of a reduced gas bladder, encapsulated in expansions of the parapophysis of the first vertebrae, and of odontodes, small dermal denticles. Amphiliidae is the most basal group in Loricarioidea. In some older sources, Amphiliidae is not even included in this classification. Based on morphologically evidence, Trichomycteridae and Nematogenyiidae diverge first; these two families are probably sister groups. This relationship was neither supported nor rejected by molecular evidence. Next, the order of divergence is probably Callichthyidae, then Scoloplacidae, and then Astroblepidae and Loricariidae. A trend in increasingly complex jaw morphology can be seen in this superfamily, which may have allowed for the great diversification of the Loricariidae, which have the most advanced jaws.

=== Families and subfamilies ===
Loricarioidei contains the following families and subfamilies:

- Family Nematogenyidae Bleeker, 1862 (mountain catfishes)
- Family Trichomycteridae Bleeker, 1858 (pencil catfishes)
  - Subfamily Copionodontinae de Pinna, 1992 (Chapada pencil catfishes)
  - Subfamily Trichogeninae Isbrücker, 1986 (longfin pencil catfishes)
  - Subfamily Trichomycterinae Bleeker, 1858 (pencil catfishes)
  - Subfamily Sarcoglanidinae Myers & Weitzman, 1966 (psammophilic pencil catfishes)
  - Subfamily Glanapteryginae Myers, 1944 (miniature pencil catfishes)
  - Subfamily Potamoglanidinae V. J. C. Reis, Lecointre & de Pinna, 2025 (pygmy pencil catfishes)
  - Subfamily Tridentinae C. H. Eigenmann, 1918 (tiny pencil catfishes)
  - Subfamily Stegophilinae Günther, 1864 (parasitic catfishes)
  - Subfamily Vandelliinae Bleeker, 1862 (hematophagous catfishes)
- Family Callichthyidae Bonaparte, 1835 (callichthyid armored catfishes)
  - Subfamily Callichthyinae Bonaparte, 1835 (callichthyines)
  - Subfamily Corydoradinae Hoedeman, 1952 (corys)
- Family Scoloplacidae Bailey & Baskin, 1976 (spiny dwarf catfishes)
- Family Astroblepidae Bleeker, 1862 (climbing catfishes)
- Family Loricariidae Rafinesque, 1815 (suckermouth armored catfishes)
  - Subfamily Lithogeninae Gosline, 1947 (climbing armored catfishes)
  - Subfamily Delturinae R. E. Reis, E. H. L. Pereira & Armbruster, 2006 (primitive suckermouth catfishes)
  - Subfamily Rhinelepinae Armbruster, 2004 (rhinelepine plecos)
  - Subfamily Loricariinae Rafinesque, 1815 (mailed catfishes)
  - Subfamily Hypoptopomatinae C. H. Eigenmann & R. S. Eigenmann 1890 (cascudinhos)
  - Subfamily Hypostominae Kner, 1853 (suckermouth catfishes)

== Distribution and habitat ==
These fish are found in freshwater habitats in the Neotropics, inhabiting South America, Panama, and Costa Rica. Most species inhabit stream habitats or pools; water in these habitats tends to move relatively quickly. Loricariids and Astroblepids have adapted to this with suckermouths that allow them to cling to surfaces. Astroblepids even have the ability to climb up waterfalls.

== Description ==
Like other catfish, loricarioidean catfish tend to have whiskers (except within the family Loricariidae). Fish in this group can be naked or, in the case of Callichthyids, Scoloplacids, and Loricariids, armored with bony plates. Most loricarioid species are depressed (flattened) in body shape, though Callichthyids tend to be more compressed (thin). Loricarioidea is defined by two characters. First, they have a unique, encapsulated gas bladder. Also, they have integumentary teeth called odontodes on their body and fin rays. In Loricariids, these odontodes on their gill cover can be extended outwards. Astroblepids may use their odontodes as a sensory organ.

== Ecology ==
Loricarioidea is a very diverse monophyletic group. These fish exhibit a wide range of morphologies and occupy many different habitats and trophic levels. This group includes herbivores, omnivores, and even parasites (candirú) and wood-eating species (Panaque). Loricariidae is by far the most successful and diverse family with approximately 700 species (and new species being discovered each year), and is the most species-rich family in the entire order.
