= Paracanthopoma cangussu =

Scientific classification
- Kingdom: Animalia
- Phylum: Chordata
- Class: Actinopterygii
- Order: Siluriformes
- Family: Trichomycteridae
- Subfamily: Vandelliinae
- Genus: Paracanthopoma
- Species: P. cangussu

Binomial name
- Paracanthopoma cangussu Henschel, Katz & W. Costa, 2021

Species of fish

Paracanthopoma cangussu is a species of freshwater ray-finned fishes belonging to the family Trichomycteridae, the pencil and parasitic catfishes, and the subfamily Vandelliinae, the haematophagic catfishes. This catfish is found in Brazil and was described in 2021.

== Description ==
The fish was classified noting differences from other congeners, including the number of odontodes (seven opercular). The number of dentary and premaxillary teeth combined is ten.

=== Diet ===
In common with the rest of its subfamily Vandelliinae, P. cangussu is hematophagous. However, several individuals used for the species description were found to have chironomid larvae in their guts.
