= Tridens melanops =

Conservation status
- Least Concern (IUCN 3.1)

Scientific classification
- Kingdom: Animalia
- Phylum: Chordata
- Class: Actinopterygii
- Order: Siluriformes
- Family: Trichomycteridae
- Genus: Tridens
- Species: T. melanops

Binomial name
- Tridens melanops C. H. Eigenmann & R. S. Eigenmann, 1889

Species of fish

Tridens melanops is a species of freshwater ray-finned fishes belonging to the family Trichomycteridae, the pencil and parasitic catfishes, and the subfamily Tridentinae, the pygmy pencil catfishes. This catfish is endemic to Brazil where it is native to the Amazon Basin. This species grows to a length of 2.7 centimetres (1.1 in) SL. It is the first species described.
