= Potamoglanis =

Scientific classification
- Kingdom: Animalia
- Phylum: Chordata
- Class: Actinopterygii
- Order: Siluriformes
- Family: Trichomycteridae
- Subfamily: Potamoglanidinae; Reis, Lecointre & de Pinna, 2025
- Genus: Potamoglanis; Henschel, Mattos, Katz & W. Costa, 2018

Type species
- Pygidium hasemani C. H. Eigenmann, 1914

Genus of fishes

Potamoglanis is a genus of freshwater ray-finned fishes belonging to the family Trichomycteridae, the pencil and parasitic catfishes. It is the only genus in the mongeneric subfamily Potamoglanidinae and are known as the pygmy pencil catfishes. The catfishes in this genus are found in South America.

== Taxonomy ==
Potamoglanis was first proposed as a genus in 2018 by Elisabeth Henschel, José Leonardo de Oliveira Mattos, Axel Makay Katz and Wilson José Eduardo Moreira da Costa with Pygidium hasemani as its type species. This taxon was previously included in the subfamily Tridentinae but it is now classified in its own monogeneric subfamily Potamoglanidinae. This subfamily is classified within the family Tichomyteridae of the suborder Loricarioidei within the order Siluriformes, the catfishes.

== Species ==
There are currently 4 recognized species in this genus:

- Potamoglanis anhanga (Dutra, Wosiacki & de Pinna, 2012)
- Potamoglanis hasemani (C. H. Eigenmann, 1914)
- Potamoglanis johnsoni (Fowler, 1932)
- Potamoglanis wapixana (Henschel, 2016)
