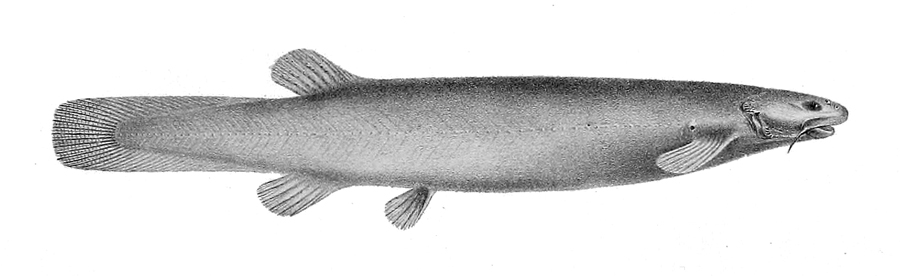
- Ochmacanthus reinhardtii

Scientific classification
- Kingdom: Animalia
- Phylum: Chordata
- Class: Actinopterygii
- Order: Siluriformes
- Family: Trichomycteridae
- Subfamily: Stegophilinae
- Genus: Ochmacanthus; C. H. Eigenmann, 1912

Type species
- Ochmacanthus flabelliferus C. H. Eigenmann, 1912

Synonyms
- Gyrinurus A. de Miranda Ribeiro, 1912

= Ochmacanthus =

Genus of fishes

Ochmacanthus of freshwater ray-finned fish belonging to the family Trichomycteridae, the pencil and parasitic catfishes, and the subfamily Stegophilinae, the parasitic catfishes. The fishes in this genus are distributed in South America. O. alternus and O. orinoco originate from the Rio Negro and Orinoco River basins of Brazil and Venezuela. O. batrachstoma inhabits the Paraguay River basin in Brazil. O. flabelliferus lives in river drainages in Guyana and Venezuela. O. reinhardtii is known from the Amazon River basin in Brazil and drainages in French Guiana.

Ochmacanthus are parasites of other fish, especially of catfish of the families Pimelodidae, Auchenipteridae, Doradidae, and Heptapteridae. They are mucus feeders, with experiments showing that they consume the mucus of goldfish. Analysis of δ^{15}N levels showed a higher trophic level than other fish analyzed, including predatory fish such as black piranha (Serrasalmus rhombeus), butterfly peacock bass, and tiger shovelnose catfish (Pseudoplatystoma fasciatum, individuals of which were found with Ochmacanthus attached to their heads), including haematophagous pencil catfish such as Vandellia and Paracanthopoma.

== Species ==
Ochmacanthus contains the following valid species:

- Ochmacanthus alternus Myers, 1927
- Ochmacanthus batrachostoma (A. de Miranda Ribeiro, 1912)
- Ochmacanthus flabelliferus C. H. Eigenmann, 1912
- Ochmacanthus orinoco Myers, 1927
- Ochmacanthus reinhardtii (Steindachner, 1882)
