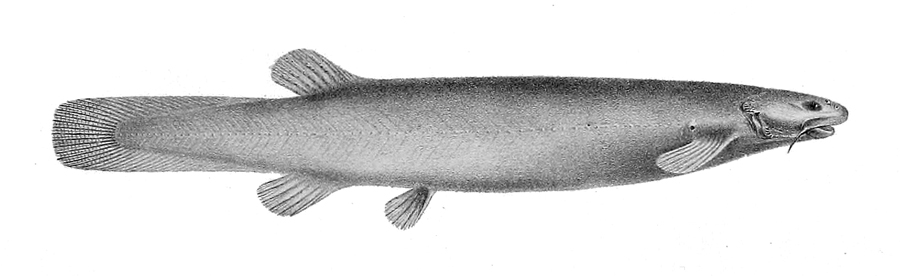
- Ochmacanthus reinhardtii

Scientific classification
- Kingdom: Animalia
- Phylum: Chordata
- Class: Actinopterygii
- Division: Teleostei
- Order: Siluriformes
- Family: Trichomycteridae
- Subfamily: Stegophilinae; Günther, 1864

Type genus
- Stegophilus Reinhardt, 1859

= Stegophilinae =

Subfamily of catfishes

Stegophilinae is a subfamily of freshwater ray-finned fishes belonging to the family Trichomycteridae, the pencil and parasitic catfishes. Stegophilines are sometimes considered candirú due to their parasitic or semiparasitic habits, because of their peculiar habit of feeding on scales, mucus, or the skin of other fishes.

The Stegophilinae are widely distributed in the main South American river basins, including the Amazon, Orinoco, São Francisco, Paraná-Paraguay, and those of southern Brazil. Eight of the genera are distributed in Venezuela.

== Taxonomy ==
The subfamily is defined by a few characters, such as osteological synapomorphies of the mandibular and suspensorial arches, and a wide, crescent-shaped, non-occluding mouth, though Pareiodon "secondarily reversed" this trait and has differing mouth anatomy.

Stegophilinae contains the following valid genera:

- Acanthopoma Lütken, 1892
- Apomatoceros C. H. Eigenmann, 1922
- Haemomaster Myers, 1927
- Henonemus C. H. Eigenmann & Ward, 1907
- Homodiaetus C. H. Eigenmann & Ward, 1907
- Megalocentor de Pinna & Britski, 1991
- Ochmacanthus C. H. Eigenmann, 1912
- Pareiodon Kner, 1855
- Pseudostegophilus C. H. Eigenmann & R. S. Eigenmann, 1889
- Schultzichthys Dahl, 1960
- Stegophilus Reinhardt, 1859

Stegophilinae has consistently been found to form a monophyletic group (clade); the subfamily also encompass smaller clades which are supported by two characteristics of the lateral line, including Acanthopoma, Henonemus, Megalocentor, Pareiodon, Parastegophilus, and Pseudostegophilus. Acanthopoma and Henonemus were found to have a sister group relationship. The following cladogram is based on a 2026 phylogenetic study of morphology using maximum parsimony:

- Tridentinae
- - Vandelliinae
  - Stegophilinae
    - - - Haemomaster
        - Stegophilus
      - Ochmacanthus spp.
    - - - Arhinoglanis
        - - Homodiaetus
          - Schultzichthys
      - - Pareiodon
        - - Acanthopoma
          - - - - Apomatoceros
                - Megalocentor
              - Henonemus spp.
            - Pseudostegophilus spp.
