= Scleronema =

Scleronema may refer to:

- Scleronema (fish), a genus of fishes in the family Trichomycteridae
- Scleronema (plant), a genus of plants in the family Malvaceae
