= Tridentopsis brevis =

Conservation status
- Least Concern (IUCN 3.1)

Scientific classification
- Kingdom: Animalia
- Phylum: Chordata
- Class: Actinopterygii
- Order: Siluriformes
- Family: Trichomycteridae
- Genus: Tridentopsis
- Species: T. brevis

Binomial name
- Tridentopsis brevis (C. H. Eigenmann & R. S. Eigenmann, 1889)

Synonyms
- Tridens brevis C. H. Eigenmann & R. S. Eigenmann, 1889; Tridensimilis brevis (C. H. Eigenmann & R. S. Eigenmann, 1889)

Species of fish

Tridentopsis brevis is a species of freshwater ray-finned fishes belonging to the family Trichomycteridae, the pencil and parasitic catfishes, and the subfamily Tridentinae, the pygmy pencil catfishes. This catfish is found in South America, #in the Amazon River basin in Brazil. T. brevis lives in the sand of shallow rivers and creeks. It is parasitic, entering the gill chambers of larger catfishes. It is also known for entering, probably by mistake, the urethra of mammals urinating under water.
