= Potamoglanis anhanga =

Conservation status
- Least Concern (IUCN 3.1)

Scientific classification
- Kingdom: Animalia
- Phylum: Chordata
- Class: Actinopterygii
- Order: Siluriformes
- Family: Trichomycteridae
- Genus: Potamoglanis
- Species: P. anhanga

Binomial name
- Potamoglanis anhanga (Dutra, Wosiacki & de Pinna, 2012)

Synonyms
- Trichomycterus anhanga Dutra, Wosiacki & de Pinna, 2012

Species of fish

Potamoglanis anhanga is a species of freshwater ray-finned fishes belonging to the family Trichomycteridae, the pencil and parasitic catfishes. This species is endemic to Brazil, where it occurs in the Amazon river basin in the state of Amazonas. This species reaches a maximum length of 1.3 centimetres (0.51 in) SL.
