= Tembeassu marauna =

Conservation status
- Critically endangered, possibly extinct (IUCN 3.1)

Scientific classification
- Kingdom: Animalia
- Phylum: Chordata
- Class: Actinopterygii
- Order: Gymnotiformes
- Family: Apteronotidae
- Subfamily: Apteronotinae
- Genus: Tembeassu; Triques, 1998
- Species: T. marauna

Binomial name
- Tembeassu marauna Triques, 1998
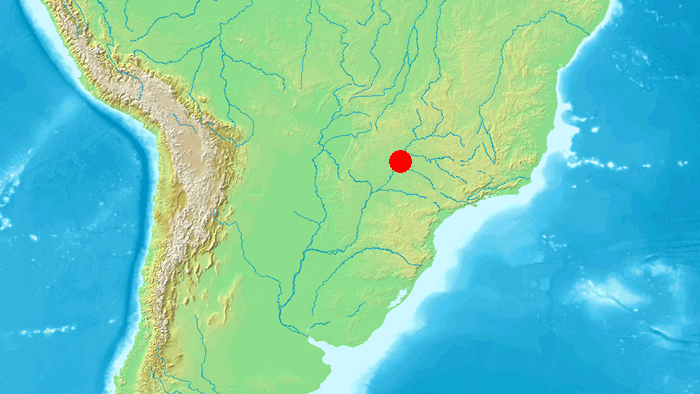
- Occurrences of T. marauna

Species of fish

Tembeassu marauna is a species of weakly electric knifefish in the family Apteronotidae. This species is known only from three specimens collected from the upper Paraná River, Brazil, in 1965. This fish can be identified by fleshy extensions at the tips of its upper and lower jaws, with the upper extension bearing a patch of extra teeth. The function of these unique structures is unknown, but may relate to feeding. Apparently a specialized inhabitant of deep riverine environments, T. marauna may be endangered by extensive dam construction in the upper Paraná region, if not already extinct.

== Taxonomy ==
Brazilian ichthyologist Mauro Luís Triques described T. marauna in a 1998 volume of the scientific journal Revue française d'Aquariologie. In 2001, James S. Albert referred this species to a monophyletic group he termed "Apteronotus sensu stricto", which placed Tembeassu in synonymy with Apteronotus. However, a subsequent re-examination of the original specimens by Ricardo Campos-da-Paz in 2005 found that this species does not share the derived characters of Apteronotus; Campos-da-Paz thus returned T. marauna to its own genus until its phylogenetic relationships can be better investigated. A second species in this genus, Tembeassu titanicus, was described in 2022 from the same type locality as T. marauna, as well as from another location in the Paraná River catchment in Minas Gerais.

== Distribution and habitat ==
The three known specimens of T. marauna, two male and one female, were collected from the upper Paraná River at the border between the Brazilian states of Mato Grosso do Sul and São Paulo in 1965, during the construction of the coffer dam for the Ilha Solteira reservoir. These records suggest that this species inhabits deep waters in large rivers.

== Description ==
The largest specimen of T. marauna measures 19.6 cm (7.7 in) long. Like other members of its family, this fish is knife-shaped with a long anal fin extending the length of its body, an electroreceptive appendage on its back, and no dorsal or pelvic fins. The head is long and low, with a rounded snout and a straight dorsal profile. The teeth are elongated and conical, numbering around 15 on the premaxillary bone (at the front of the upper jaw) and around 30 on the dentary bone (the lower jaw). The most distinctive feature of T. marauna is a prominent fleshy (possibly cartilaginous) extension at the tip of the upper jaw, in which approximately 15 slender teeth are loosely embedded. Another, toothless, extension is present at the tip of the lower jaw. T. marauna is mostly light brown to gray-brown.

== Biology and ecology ==
Virtually nothing is known of the natural history of T. marauna, including the function of its unique jaw extensions and extra teeth. These structures are found in both sexes, suggesting that they are not involved in reproductive behaviors as in other knifefishes with accessory teeth (e.g. Sternarchogiton nattereri). An alternate possibility is that they are used in feeding; similar structures in the stegophiline catfishes are used to gather mucus and scales. In common with other South American knifefishes, T. marauna is likely capable of generating a weak electric field for navigation and communication.

== Human interactions ==
The conservation status of T. marauna has not been evaluated by the International Union for Conservation of Nature (IUCN). No new specimens of T. marauna have surfaced in the fifty-some years since its initial discovery, during which time its native habitat has been extensively altered by dam construction. Brazil's Ministry of the Environment considers the species as critically endangered, possibly extinct.
