= Tridentopsis =

Scientific classification
- Kingdom: Animalia
- Phylum: Chordata
- Class: Actinopterygii
- Order: Siluriformes
- Family: Trichomycteridae
- Subfamily: Tridentinae
- Genus: Tridentopsis; Myers, 1925

Type species
- Tridentopsis pearsoni Myers, 1925

Genus of fishes

Tridentopsis is a genus of freshwater ray-finned fishes belonging to the family Trichomycteridae, the pencil and parasitic catfishes, and the subfamily Tridentinae, the pygmy pencil catfishes. The catfishes in this genus are found in South America.

== Species ==
There are currently four recognized species in this genus:

- Tridentopsis brevis (C. H. Eigenmann & R. S. Eigenmann, 1889)
- Tridentopsis cahuali Azpelicueta, 1990
- Tridentopsis pearsoni Myers, 1925
- Tridentopsis tocantinsi La Monte, 1939

Tridensimilis brevis is distributed in the Amazon River basin in Brazil, while T. cahuali originates from the Paraguay River basin in Argentina. T. pearsoni inhabits the upper Amazon River basin in Bolivia. T. tocantinsi lives in the Tocantins River basin in Brazil. Tridentopsis species grow to about 2.2 to 3 centimetres or 0.87 to 1.18 inches SL.
