= Miuroglanis =

Conservation status
- Least Concern (IUCN 3.1)

Scientific classification
- Kingdom: Animalia
- Phylum: Chordata
- Class: Actinopterygii
- Order: Siluriformes
- Family: Trichomycteridae
- Subfamily: Tridentinae
- Genus: Miuroglanis; C. H. Eigenmann & R. S. Eigenmann, 1889
- Species: M. platycephalus

Binomial name
- Miuroglanis platycephalus C. H. Eigenmann & R. S. Eigenmann, 1889

Genus of fishes

Miuroglanis is a monospecific genus of freshwater ray-finned fish belonging to the family Trichomycteridae, the pencil and parasitic catfishes. The only species in the genus is Miuroglanis platycephalus. This species is endemic to Brazil where it occurs in the Solimões River basin. This species grows to a length of 1.2 centimetres (0.47 in) NG.
