= Rhinotridens =

Scientific classification
- Kingdom: Animalia
- Phylum: Chordata
- Class: Actinopterygii
- Order: Siluriformes
- Family: Trichomycteridae
- Subfamily: Tridentinae
- Genus: Rhinotridens; Datovo, Ochoa, Vita, Presti, Ohara & de Pinna, 2023

Type species
- Rhinotridens chromocaudatus Datovo, Ochoa, Vita, Presti, Ohara & de Pinna, 2023

Genus of fishes

Rhinotridens is a genus of freshwater ray-finned fishes belonging to the family Trichomycteridae, the pencil and parasitic catfishes, and the subfamily Tridentinae, the pygmy pencil catfishes. The catfishes in this genus are found in the Amazon Basin of South America.

== Species ==
Rhinotridens contains the following valid species:

- Rhinotridens britskii de Pinna, Reis, Pastana & Datovo, 2024
- Rhinotridens chromocaudatus Datovo, Ochoa, Vita, Presti, Ohara & de Pinna, 2023
