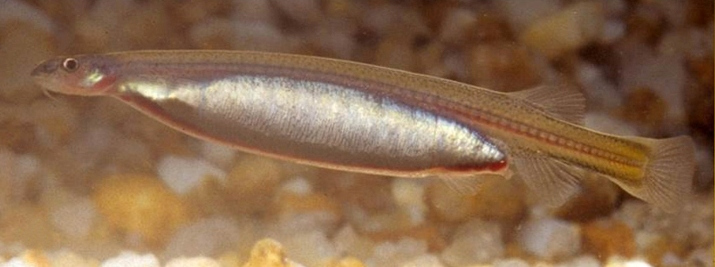
- A candiru after a full meal of blood

Conservation status
- Least Concern (IUCN 3.1)

Scientific classification
- Kingdom: Animalia
- Phylum: Chordata
- Class: Actinopterygii
- Division: Teleostei
- Order: Siluriformes
- Family: Trichomycteridae
- Genus: Vandellia
- Species: V. cirrhosa

Binomial name
- Vandellia cirrhosa Valenciennes, 1846

= Vandellia cirrhosa =

Candiru

Species of ray-finned fish

Vandellia cirrhosa, known by the common names candiru, cañero, toothpick fish, or vampire fish, is a species of parasitic freshwater catfish in the family Trichomycteridae native to the Amazon basin where it is found in the countries of Bolivia, Brazil, Colombia, Ecuador, and Peru. The name "candiru" is also used to refer to other catfish species, including the entire genus Vandellia.

This species is known for an alleged tendency to invade and parasitize the human urethra and other bodily openings; however, despite ethnographic reports dating back to the late 19th century, the first documented case of the removal of a candiru from a human urethra did not occur until 1997, and even that incident has remained a matter of controversy. Scientifically, this fish only parasitizes larger fish which it shares its habitat with; it consumes their host's blood from their gill openings, thus the candiru is a hematophagic species.

== Discovery ==
Vandellia cirrhosa was discovered in the early 1800s by Alexandre Rodrigues Ferreira, a Native Brazilian scholar studying under the Italian naturalist Professor Domingos Vandelli, of which the fish would be named after. The Spanish name cañero is a derivative of carnero, meaning flesh-eater.

== Taxonomy ==
Candiru belong to the family Trichomycteridae, which is monophyletic and contains 207 species. The taxonomic placement of this fish has long been debated, with the first proposed phylogenetic relationships of Trichomycteridae being proposed by Jonathan N. Baskin in 1973. Most proposed phylogenies have relied on morphological data, often placing Vandellinae and Stegophilinae as sister taxa among the subfamilies. A study conducted by Luis Fernández and Scott A. Schaefer, published in 2009, used DNA sequence data to create the first comprehensive treatment of phylogenetic relationships of trichomycterid catfish. Relationships among Vandelliinae were strongly supported, and Vandellia was found to be the sister group of Plectrochilus. The results of Fernández and Schaefer were fully congruent with previous statements based on morphological data. Nonetheless, the taxonomy of the Vandellia genus is still incomplete and hindered by the fact that several species within the genus have often been attributed the same name.

== Description ==
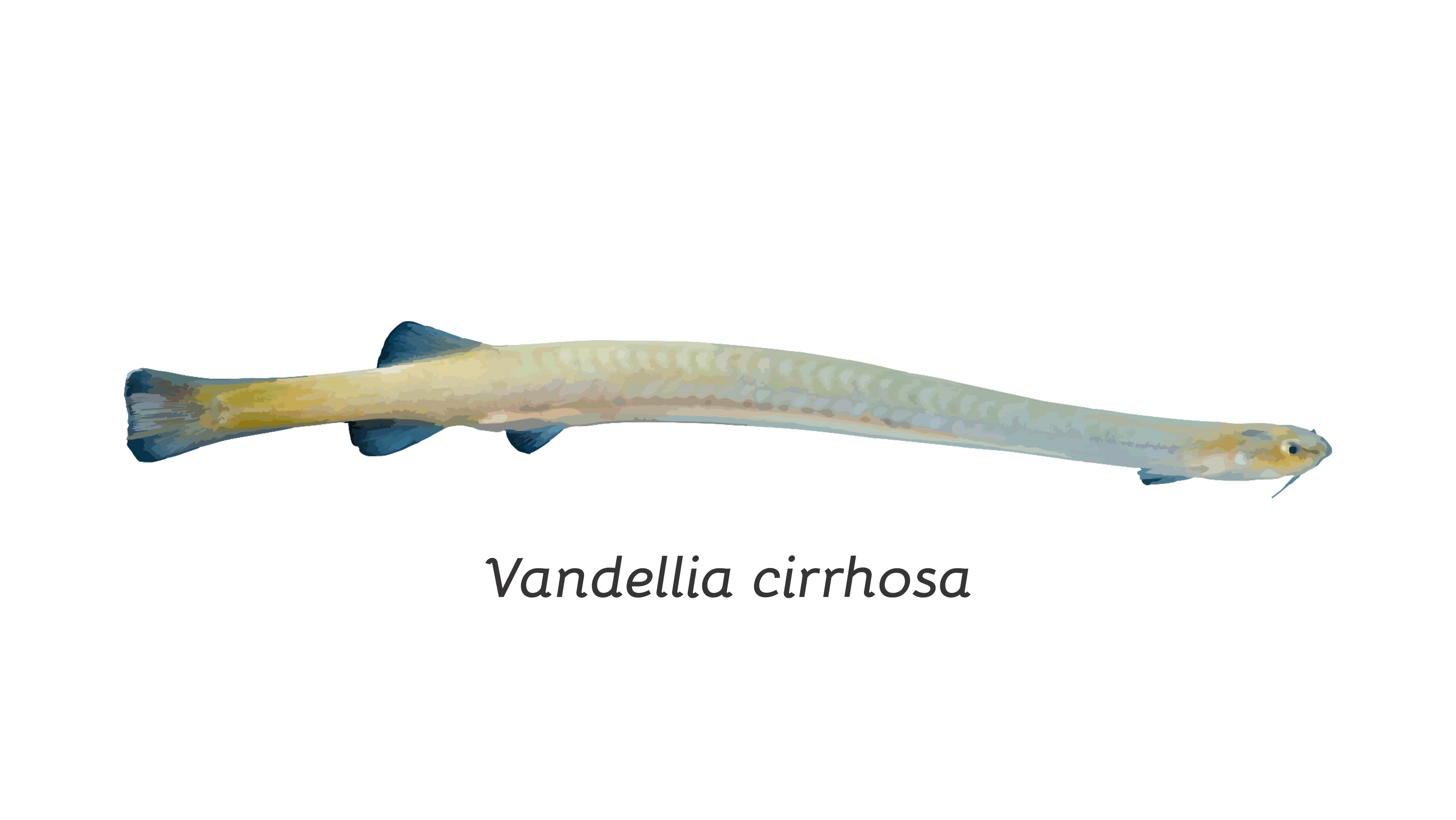
An artistic rendition of Vandellia cirrhosa.

Vandellia cirrhosa is a small, freshwater catfish. Members of the genus Vandellia can reach up to 17 cm (7 in) in standard length, but some others can grow to around 40 cm (16 in). The fish has an elongated body with an anterior dorsal fin and pelvic fin, and an anal fin slightly larger than the dorsal fin. The caudal fin is fairly small with a truncated shape. Each has a rather small head and a belly that can appear distended, especially after a large blood meal. The body is translucent, making it quite difficult to spot in the turbid waters of its home. Blood is often visible through the translucent body after feeding. The fish has small eyes with yellow irises. There are short sensory barbels around the head, together with short, backward pointing spines on the gill covers. These spines have been described as popping out in an umbrella-like fashion, which could be used to help lodge the fish into its host.

All members of the subfamily Vandelliinae share the traits of blood parasitism, with parasitism in general being a shared ancestral trait of all members of Trichomycteridae. They have individual claw-like teeth for this purpose. Their bodies are very small and elongated to easily slip into the gills of host fish.

== Habitat and distribution ==
Candiru inhabits the Amazon and Orinoco basins of lowland Amazonia.

This fish lives in shallow water with muddy, sandy, or rocky bottoms. It can be found in riffles. Its distribution is patchy and it does not seem to move very far from its spawning sites.

One location that Vandellia cirrhosa is specifically known to inhabit is the Purus River of Brazil. This location is hard to study due to its geographic isolation, something that is common among the habitats of candiru.

== Diet ==
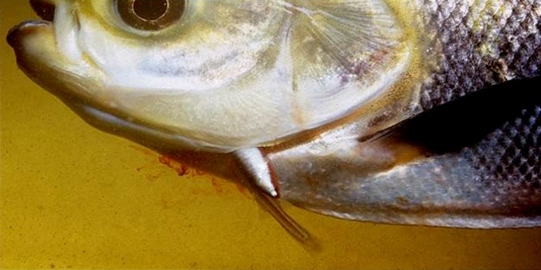
A candiru taking blood from the gills of a fish host.

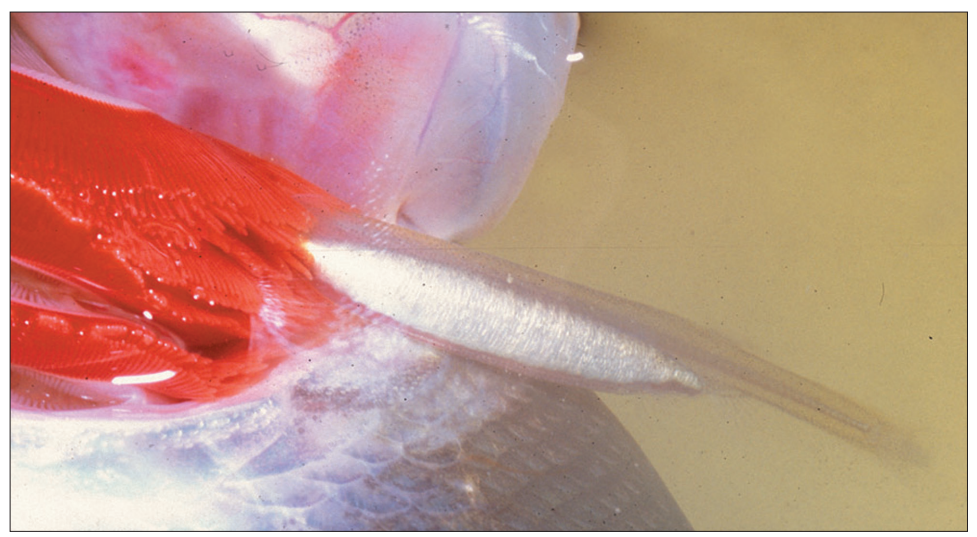
A closeup of a feeding candiru as it begins to swell with blood.

Candiru are hematophagous and parasitizes the gills of larger Amazonian fish, especially catfish of the family Pimelodidae (Siluriformes) and members of the family Characidae. However, it has been known to parasitize many species in the same location, suggesting that its feeding habit is based more on availability than species preference. Vandellinae is one of only two groups of jawed vertebrates that exclusively feed on blood.

The feeding mechanism of the candiru was not understood until fairly recently, but many theories had been proposed before. Some suggested that it uses its sharp teeth to latch onto an artery or vein and stays attached to the host until it has ingested enough blood. It then lets go of the host and continues swimming. Others suggested that it extracts blood from its hosts by latching onto the gill filaments, which bleed freely into the alimentary tract of the candiru. In one experiment involving Vandellia cirrhosa, no evidence of gill damage was found on the fish hosts. Thus, the experimenter suggested a hypothetical blood-pumping mechanism in which the candiru is able to quickly ingest large amounts of blood without permanently damaging the host.

Modern experiments have shown that the candiru feeds by approaching a host fish and swimming alongside it until close to the gill cover. It then attempts to penetrate the gill chamber by forcing itself underneath. The candiru has also been seen entering the host through its mouth, though this behavior seems to be rare. While latched onto the host fish's gill chamber with sharp teeth, the candiru goes limp and quickly swells up with blood. The gut of this species is a straight tube with loosely-spaced fibers lining the walls of the connective tissue, most likely facilitating the swelling of the belly that is associated with the candiru. The lack of any protrusible jaw supports the theory that this species does not suck blood, but rather bites into a blood vessel and ingests the fluid that flows freely into the mouth. Because the candiru relies on the blood pressure of the host to ingest blood from the ventral or dorsal arteries, host fish must be selected by size.

The time taken to get its fill of blood depends on the size of the candiru and whether it has attached to a large or small blood vessel. Because of the small size of Vandellia cirrhosa, it generally seems to take no more than two minutes to ingest the required amount of blood from the host fish. This short duration is theoretically beneficial to the candiru because it is only vulnerable to predators for a short period of time.

In most cases, the host fish do not seem to be badly wounded by this process. There is generally no observable damage to the gill filaments. However, relatively deep crescent or elliptical-shaped wounds with coagulated blood inside can be found beneath the gill cover.

When starving, the candiru may resort to entering unusual orifices such as the nostril of a host fish. This behavior may relate to reported cases of these fish penetrating human orifices such as the urethra.

== Relation to humans ==
=== Alleged attacks ===
Although lurid anecdotes of attacks on humans abound, only one somewhat questionable case has evidence behind it, and some alleged traits of the fish have been discredited as myth or superstition. It is likely that, while the fish's spines can cause physical trauma, it merely poses as much danger of actually entering a human as any other fish of its size.

=== Conservation status ===
The remote habitat of the candiru, as well as the indigenous cultural customs surrounding its location, makes it difficult to study. The number of Vandellia cirrhosa in the wild is unknown, but there are no conservation efforts in place to protect these fish.

One of its main habitats, the Purus River, is currently the main source of fish for human consumption in the most populous city of the Central Amazon, Manaus. This creates a huge pressure on fish stocks, which may be indirectly affecting the candiru by depleting its population of potential host fish.
