= Nematogenys cuivi =

Scientific classification
- Kingdom: Animalia
- Phylum: Chordata
- Class: Actinopterygii
- Order: Siluriformes
- Family: Nematogenyidae
- Genus: Nematogenys
- Species: †N. cuivi

Binomial name
- †Nematogenys cuivi Azpelicueta & Rubilar, 1998

Extinct species of fish

Nematogenys cuivi is a Miocene species of fossil ray-finned fish belonging to the family Nematogenyidae, the mountain catfishes. This species was described from a fossil found in the fluviolacustrine, i.e. sediments deposited by both rivers and lakes, in the upper Cura–Mallín Formation between 37°S and 39°S in Chile. The only other member of this family is the extant Nematogenys inermis of Central Chile.
