= Tridensimilis =

Conservation status
- Data Deficient (IUCN 3.1)

Scientific classification
- Kingdom: Animalia
- Phylum: Chordata
- Class: Actinopterygii
- Order: Siluriformes
- Family: Trichomycteridae
- Genus: Tridensimilis; Schultz, 1944
- Species: T. venezuelae

Binomial name
- Tridensimilis venezuelae Schultz, 1944

Genus of fishes

Tridensimilis is a monotypic genus of freshwater ray-finned fishes belonging to the family Trichomycteridae, the pencil and parasitic catfishes, and the subfamily Tridentinae, the pygmy pencil catfishes. The only species in this genus is Tridensimilis venezuelae.

T. venezuelae is distributed in the Orinoco basin in Venezuela. It grows to about 2.5 centimetres (0.98 in) TL.
