= Tembeassu =

Scientific classification
- Kingdom: Animalia
- Phylum: Chordata
- Class: Actinopterygii
- Order: Gymnotiformes
- Family: Apteronotidae
- Subfamily: Apteronotinae
- Genus: Tembeassu; Triques, 1998

Type species
- Tembeassu marauna Triques, 1998

Genus of fishes

Tembeassu is a genus of freshwater ray-finned fishes belonging to the family Apteronotidae, the ghost knifefishes. The fishes in this genus are found in South America.

== Species ==
Tembeassu contains the following species:

- Tembeassu marauna Triques, 1998
- Tembeassu titanicus Peixoto, Campos-da-Paz, Menezes, de Santana, Triques & Datovo, 2022
