= Schultzichthys =

Scientific classification
- Kingdom: Animalia
- Phylum: Chordata
- Class: Actinopterygii
- Order: Siluriformes
- Family: Trichomycteridae
- Subfamily: Stegophilinae
- Genus: Schultzichthys; Dahl, 1960

Type species
- Schultzichthys gracilis Dahl, 1960

Genus of fishes

Schultzichthys is a genus of freshwater ray-finned fish belonging to the family Trichomycteridae, the pencil and parasitic catfishes, and the subfamily Stegophilinae, the parasitic catfishes. These catfishes are found in South America.

== Species ==
Schultzichthyscontains the following valid species:

- Schultzichthys bondi (Myers, 1942)
- Schultzichthys gracilis Dahl, 1960

S. bondi is from the Amazon and Orinoco River basins, while S. gracilis is from the Guayabero River of the Orinoco River basin in Colombia. Schultzichthys species grow to between 2.6–3.7 centimetres (1.0–1.5 in) SL.
