= Cetopsis candiru =

Conservation status
- Least Concern (IUCN 3.1)

Scientific classification
- Kingdom: Animalia
- Phylum: Chordata
- Class: Actinopterygii
- Order: Siluriformes
- Family: Cetopsidae
- Genus: Cetopsis
- Species: C. candiru

Binomial name
- Cetopsis candiru Spix & Agassiz, 1829

Synonyms
- Hemicetopsis candiru (Spix & Agassiz, 1829); Cetopsis spixii Swainson, 1839

Species of fish

Cetopsis candiru, also known as candiru, candiru açú, candiru cobra or canero, is a carnivorous species of whale catfish found in the Amazon basin of Peru, Brazil and Bolivia. Similar to Cetopsis coecutiens, Cetopsis candiru is a large species of the genus Cetopsis and a widespread scavenger, known for its voracious feeding and the habit of burrowing into the carcasses of dead animals and humans. Despite its name, it is not closely related to the bloodsucking Candiru (Vandellia cirrhosa).

== Names ==
They are known by multiple names across their range. In Bolivia they are called "Canero" or just "Candiru". The term "Canero" is also used in Peru. Candiru açú is also used on occasion, however according to some researchers this name is primarily used for other species of the genus Cetopsis including C. coecutiens and C. gobioides. Alternatively the name "candiru cobra" is also used. The name Candiru is shared with many other species of catfish, including Vandellia cirrhosa, a parasitic catfish from the family Trichomycteridae which is otherwise unrelated to members of the Cetopsidae.

== Description ==
Cetopsis candiru closely resembles its sister species, C. coecutiens, but it may be distinguished through its relatively "shallow" body (body depth 20% of standard length or less) and more incisiform teeth.

The body of Cetopsis candiru is elongated and smooth with a broadly rounded, triangular head. The eyes are located on the dorsolateral surface of the head and situated far towards the front of the skull within the first fifth of the head length. They are small, only around as large as the circular anterior nares, which are surrounded by a rim of skin. In addition to the anterior nares, Cetopsis candiru also possesses a second pair of nares further back on the skull that open towards the top of the body, which are also surrounded by tubular skin. The mouth is located low on the head and around half as wide as the head is long. The margins of the lower jaw are shortened and reach approximately as far back as the eyes. The teeth of the premaxilla are incisiform and form a single, gently curved row. In addition to them C. candiru also possesses teeth on the vomer which share their incisiform morphology with those of the premaxilla and are likewise arranged in a single curved row. Finally the dentary mimics the same tooth arrangement, if notably larger compared to the premaxillary and vomerine dentition. Through this C. candiru differs from its relatives, known for having conical teeth on the vomer and dentary. Like many other species of catfish, Cetopsis candiru has long, whisker-like growths known as barbels. The maxillary barbels are about a third of the length of the skull and originate below the front-most edge of the eyes. Two pairs of mental barbels are present on the lower jaw and equal in length and size to those of the maxilla.

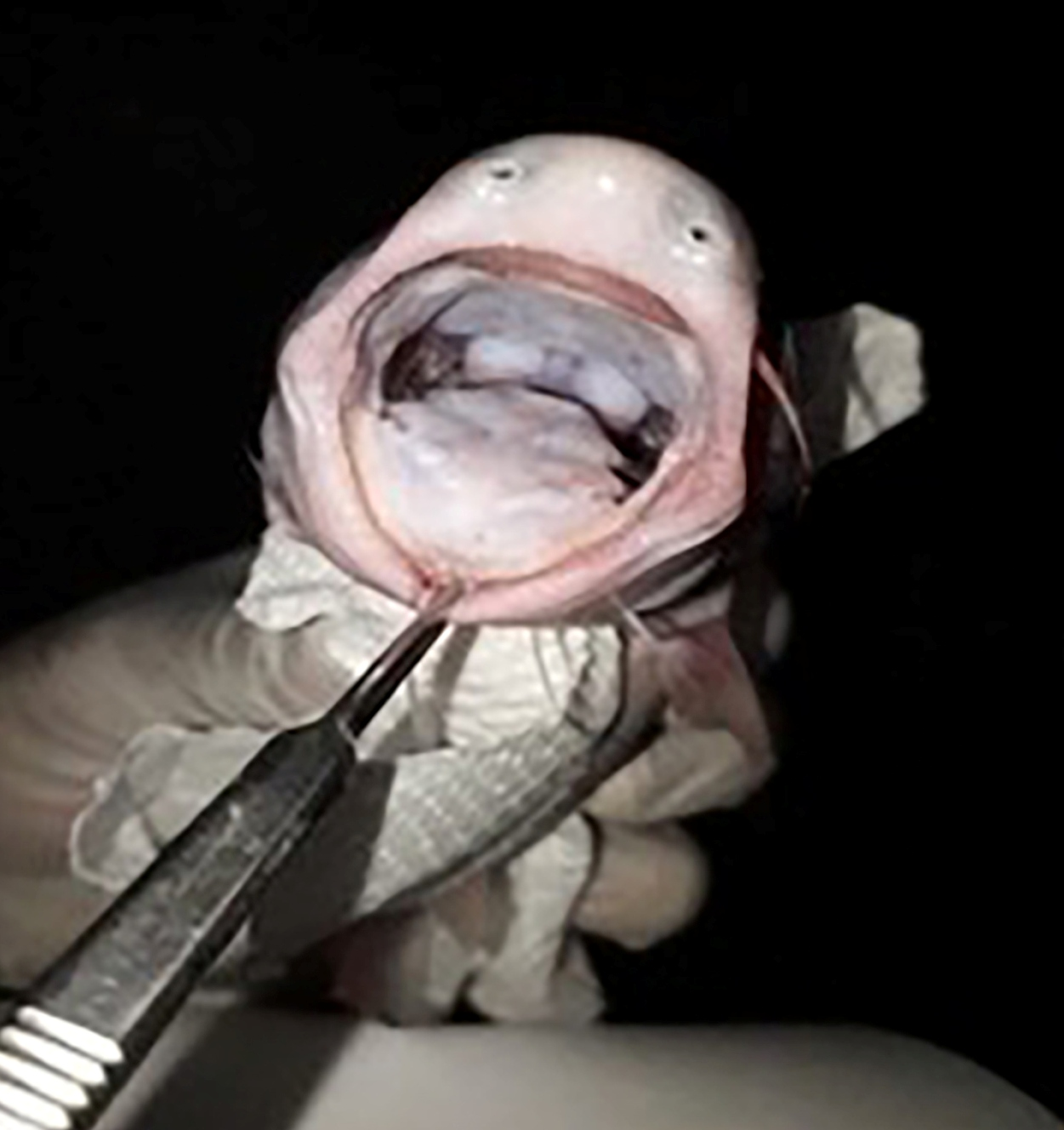
Mouth of "Candiru açú"

The dorsal fin is relatively small and located towards the front of the body, lacking spines. The base of the caudal fin (caudal peduncle) is approximately as deep as it is long. The caudal fin itself is symmetrical and slightly forked, with the rounded lobes approximately 1.5 to 1.6 times longer than the shallowest part of the fin. The anal fin is located in the back half of the body and its base takes up approximately a third of the animal's length. Its shape is gently convex and its rear end does not attach to the body. In Cetopsis candiru the pelvic fins are short and paddle-like with rounded symmetrical edges. Like with the anal fin, there is no membrane attaching the last fin ray directly to the body. Finally the pectoral fins are around half as long as the head with rounded edges.

Mature males however differ from females and juveniles in the morphology of some of their fins. The first fin rays of both the dorsal and pectoral fins are distinctly elongated beyond what can be seen in younger or female individuals and the anal fin is noticeably more convex. When this sexual dimorphism sets in is not fully known. The smallest specimen showing all of these traits measured 145 mm (5.7 in) in standard length (tip of the skull to the end of the hypural plate). Another, smaller individual measuring 137 mm (5.4 in) shows the onsets of these elements' growth.

Alongside C. coecutiens, C. candiru is one of the largest species within the genus Cetopsis. They range in size from 1.8 cm (0.71 in) to 26.3 cm (10.4 in).

== Ecology ==
Cetopsis candiru is a carnivorous fish and commonly described as a voracious feeder, making use of powerful jaw musculature and a nearly continuous cutting surface of the incisiform dentition. Their distribution overlaps with that of the related Cetopsis coecutiens and both species are known to simultaneously feed on the same bodies. They do however differ in the specifics of their behavior. Cetopsis candiru typically bite into carcasses and twist to create an entry into the body before proceeding to feed from the inside, where they may congregate in vast numbers during feeding frenzies. Due to these habits carcasses that were fed on by C. candiru oftentimes appear almost entirely skeletonized, but retain cartilage, eyeballs and tight skin. Cetopsis coecutiens on the other hand does not remain inside the body and instead will return to it multiple times, each time ripping away chunks of flesh. Both species leave similar circular bitemarks on bodies they scavenged on. They are opportunistic animals, feeding on the carcasses of animals that have drowned or otherwise died and fallen into the water. The role of these fish as important aquatic scavengers is highlighted by their prominent appearance in forensics around the Amazon, being well known to even feed on dead human bodies found in the various rivers of northern South America.

At least one confirmed report tells of a single Cetopsis attacking a living child, although the exact culprit could not be determined between the two carnivorous species C. candiru and C. coecutiens. Other reports mention Cetopsis candiru feeding on live fish caught in gillnets or hooked by fishermen.

== Distribution ==
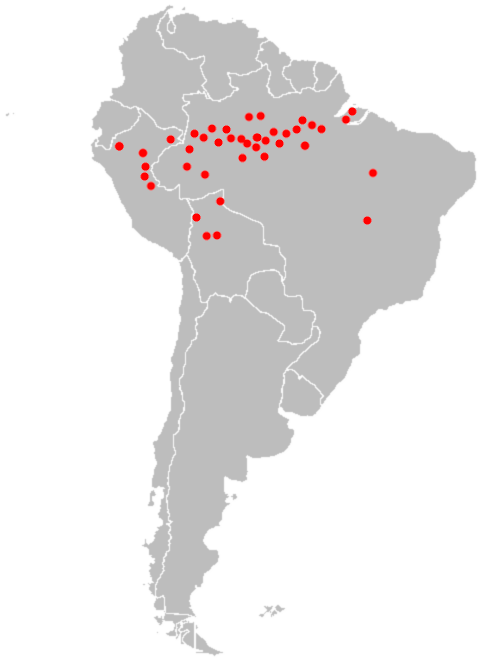
Known range of Cetopsis candiru

Cetopsis candiru is known across large parts of the Amazon Basin. Specimens have been discovered in Brazil close to the Amazon River itself, the Rio Tocantins, the Rio Negro, the Rio Purus and the Rio Madeira among others. In Bolivia they occur in various tributaries to the Rio Madeira such as the Rio Beni and in Peru they were recovered from the Rio Ucayali and other tributaries to the Amazon. Some scientists also report the presence of Cetopsis candiru from eastern Ecuador.

== Taxonomy and classification ==
Cetopsis candiru was first described in 1829 by Spix & Agassiz on the basis of four syntype specimens. The same year Cuvier established the name Silurus candira, which however is a nomen nudum. Several other names were subsequently coined, none of which however remained. In 1839 Cetopsis spixii was introduced in an attempt to replace the prior name and in 1862 C. candiru was chosen to serve as the type species of the newly erected genus Hemicetopsis. Several synonyms are also the result of authors variously using either "candiru" or "candira" as the species name.

Studies have found that Cetopsi candiru is closely related to the large and carnivorous Cetopsis coecutiens as well as the diminutive Cetopsis oliveirai. This presents a diverse clade formed by the three, as it includes both the two largest and one of the smallest species of the genus. Additionally, all three species are highly distinct, having each been placed in different genera at varying points in the past (Hemicetopsis, Cetopsis and Bathycetopsis). The idea that they form a monophyletic group within Cetopsis is well supported and comparison between adults of C. oliveirai show that the species appears much like juveniles of C. coecutiens. A sister relationship between C. coecutiens and C. candiru however is not as well supported.

- Cetopsidae
  - Helogenes
  - Cetopsinae
    - Cetopsidium
    - - Denticetopsis
      - Cetopsini
        - Paracetopsis
        - Cetopsis
          - - Cetopsis amphiloxa
            - - Cetopsis motatanensis
              - - Cetopsis baudoensis
                - - Cetopsis fimbriata
                  - - Cetopsis oliveirai
                    - - Cetopsis coecutiens
                      - Cetopsis candiru
          - Other Cetopsis species
