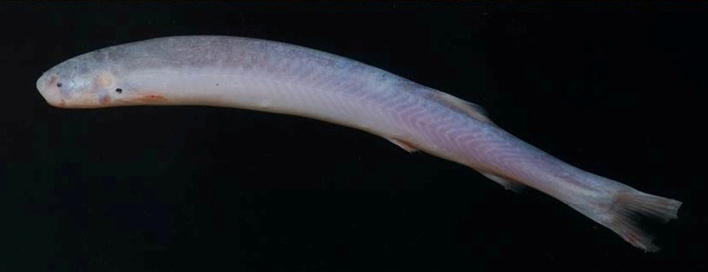

Conservation status
- Least Concern (IUCN 3.1)

Scientific classification
- Kingdom: Animalia
- Phylum: Chordata
- Class: Actinopterygii
- Division: Teleostei
- Order: Siluriformes
- Family: Trichomycteridae
- Subfamily: Stegophilinae
- Genus: Pareiodon; Kner, 1855
- Species: P. microps

Binomial name
- Pareiodon microps Kner, 1855

Synonyms
- Of Pareiodon: Centrophorus Kner, 1859; Astemomycterus Guichenot, 1860; Of Pareiodon microps: Trichomycterus pusillus Castelnau, 1855

= Pareiodon =

Monotypic genus of fish

Pareiodon is a monospecific genus of freshwater ray-finned fish belonging to the family Trichomycteridae, the pencil and parasitic catfishes, and the subfamily Stegophilinae, the parasitic catfishes. The only species in the genus is Pareiodon microps. This catfish occurs in the Amazon Basin in Brazil, Colombia and Peru.

Like its stegophiline relatives, they possess a sucking, disk-like mouth, along with inter- and opercular spines which facilitates adhesion to its food items, though this species is a scavenger, unlike its ectoparasitic relatives. During feeding events involving vertebrate carcasses, P. microps may be associated with other species of scavengers; the whale candirus, Cetopsis candiru and Ce. coecutiens, are not closely related to P. microps despite also being considered "candiru"; the vulture catfish Calophysus macropterus is a much larger scavenger that may also join the candirus at the carcass.
