= Pseudostegophilus =

Scientific classification
- Kingdom: Animalia
- Phylum: Chordata
- Class: Actinopterygii
- Order: Siluriformes
- Family: Trichomycteridae
- Subfamily: Stegophilinae
- Genus: Pseudostegophilus; C. H. Eigenmann & R. S. Eigenmann, 1889

Type species
- Stegophilus nemurus Günther, 1869

Synonyms
- Parastegophilus P. Miranda Ribeiro, 1946

Genus of fishes

Pseudostegophilus is a genus of freshwater ray-finned fish belonging to the family Trichomycteridae, the pencil and parasitic catfishes, and the subfamily Stegophilinae, the parasitic catfishes. These catfishes are found in rivers in tropical South America. The members of this genus are obligate parasites that feed on scales and mucus of other fish.

== Species ==
Pseudostegophilus contains the following valid species:

- Pseudostegophilus haemomyzon (Myers, 1942)
- Pseudostegophilus maculatus (Steindachner, 1879)
- Pseudostegophilus nemurus (Günther, 1869)
- Pseudostegophilus paulensis A. Miranda-Ribeiro, 1918

== Distribution and biology ==
P. haemomyzon originates from the Orinoco River basin in Venezuela while P. nemurus is found in the Amazon basin in Brazil and Peru. P. haemomyzon grows to about 5.7 centimetres (2.2 in) SL. P. nemurus grows to about 15.0 cm (5.9 in) TL. P. nemurus is said to become attached to the gills, anal region, and fins of dead, dying, or disabled fishes. P. maculatus originates from the lower Paraná and Uruguay River basins in Argentina, Brazil, and Uruguay, while P. paulensis is from the upper Paraná River basin in Brazil. The remaining Pseudostegophilus species grow to about 5.4–6.0 centimetres (2.1–2.4 inches) in length. P. maculatus enters the gill chamber of the catfish Luciopimelodus pati and feeds on the gills.
