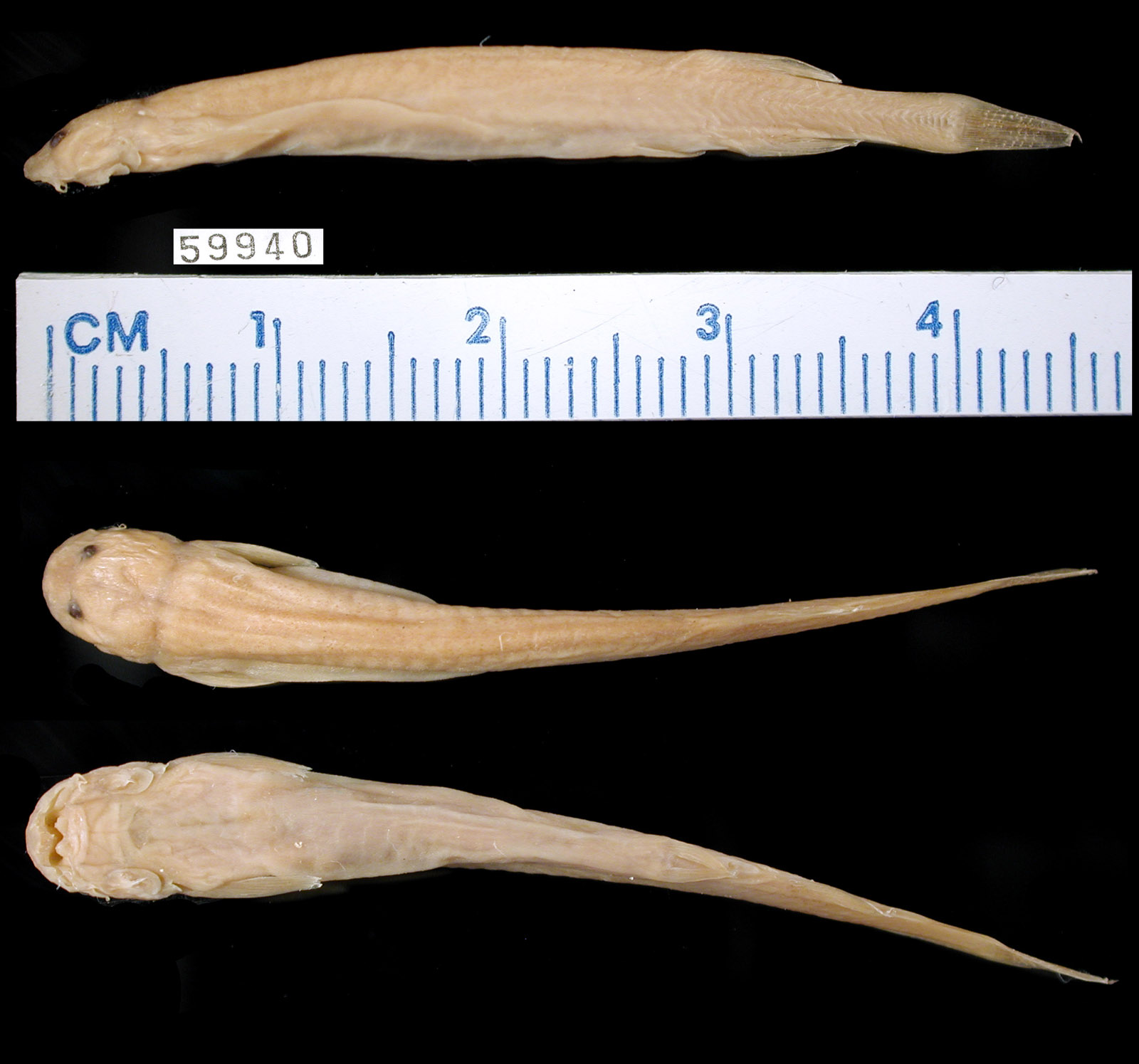

Scientific classification
- Kingdom: Animalia
- Phylum: Chordata
- Class: Actinopterygii
- Order: Siluriformes
- Family: Trichomycteridae
- Subfamily: Vandelliinae
- Genus: Plectrochilus; A. Miranda-Ribeiro, 1917

Type species
- Plectrochilus machadoi Miranda-Ribeiro, 1917

= Plectrochilus =

Genus of fishes

Plectrochilus is a genus of freshwater ray-finned fishes belonging to the family Trichomycteridae, the pencil and parasitic catfishes, and the subfamily Vandelliinae, the haematophagic catfishes. The catfishes in this genus are found in South America.

== Species ==
Plectrochilus contains the following valid species:

- Plectrochilus diabolicus (Myers, 1927)
- Plectrochilus machadoi A. Miranda-Ribeiro, 1917
- Plectrochilus wieneri (Pellegrin, 1909)

P. diabolicus and P. machadoi are found in the Amazon River basin in Brazil and Peru, while P. wieneri is found in the Napo River basin of Ecuador.

P. diabolicus grows to 4.8 centimetres (1.9 in) SL. P. machadoi grows to 9.3 cm (3.7 in).

Specimens of P. machadoi have been found partially buried in the belly of a specimen of Pseudoplatystoma where it apparently had burrowed through the body wall.
