= Tridens (fish) =

Scientific classification
- Kingdom: Animalia
- Phylum: Chordata
- Class: Actinopterygii
- Order: Siluriformes
- Family: Trichomycteridae
- Subfamily: Tridentinae
- Genus: Tridens; C. H. Eigenmann & R. S. Eigenmann, 1889

Type species
- Tridens melanops C. H. Eigenmann & R. S. Eigenmann, 1889

Genus of fishes

Tridens is a genus of freshwater ray-finned fishes belonging to the family Trichomycteridae, the pencil and parasitic catfishes, and the subfamily Tridentinae, the pygmy pencil catfishes. The catfishes in this genus are found in South America. Tridens is the type genus of the subfamily Tridentinae.

== Species ==
There are currently 3 recognized species in this genus:

- Tridens chicomendesi Henschel & W. Costa, 2023
- Tridens melanops C. H. Eigenmann & R. S. Eigenmann, 1889
- Tridens vitreus Henschel, Ohara & Costa, 2023
