= Haemomaster =

Conservation status
- Least Concern (IUCN 3.1)

Scientific classification
- Kingdom: Animalia
- Phylum: Chordata
- Class: Actinopterygii
- Order: Siluriformes
- Family: Trichomycteridae
- Subfamily: Stegophilinae
- Genus: Haemomaster; Myers, 1927
- Species: H. venezuelae

Binomial name
- Haemomaster venezuelae Myers, 1927

Monotypic genus of fish

Haemomaster is a monospecific genus of freshwater ray-finned fish belonging to the family Trichomycteridae, the pencil and parasitic catfishes, and the subfamily Stegophilinae, the parasitic catfishes. The only species in the genus is Haemomaster venezuelae. This fish grows to about 6.6 centimetres (2.6 in) SL and originates from the Amazon and Orinoco River basins.
