= Paravandellia =

Scientific classification
- Kingdom: Animalia
- Phylum: Chordata
- Class: Actinopterygii
- Order: Siluriformes
- Family: Trichomycteridae
- Subfamily: Vandelliinae
- Genus: Paravandellia; A. Miranda-Ribeiro, 1912

Type species
- Paravandellia oxyptera A. Miranda-Ribeiro, 1912

Synonyms
- Branchioica C. H. Eigenmann, 1918; Pleurophysus A. Miranda Ribeiro, 1918; Parabranchioica Devincenzi & Vaz-Ferreira, 1939

Genus of fishes

Paravandellia is a genus of freshwater ray-finned fishes belonging to the family Trichomycteridae, the pencil and parasitic catfishes, and the subfamily Vandelliinae, the haematophagic catfishes. The catfishes in this genus are found in South America.

== Species ==
Paravandellia contains the following valid species:

- Paravandellia alleynei Henschel, Bernt, Baskin, Schmidt & Lujan, 2021
- Paravandellia brooksi Henschel, Baskin, Collins & Lujan, 2024
- Paravandellia luna Henschel, Baskin, Collins & Lujan, 2024
- Paravandellia oscarleoni Henschel, Baskin, Collins & Lujan, 2024
- Paravandellia oxyptera A. Miranda-Ribeiro, 1912
- Paravandellia phaneronema (Miles, 1943)
- Paravandellia vampyra (de Pinna & Dagosta, 2022)

== Distribution ==
P. oxyptera is distributed in the Paraná, Paraguay, and Uruguay River basins in Brazil, Paraguay, and Uruguay. P. phaneronema originates from the Magdalena and Cauca River basins of Colombia.

== Description ==
Paravandellia species grow to about 2.5–2.8 centimetres (0.98–1.10 inches) in length. Females have been found at 1.8 cm (0.71 in) TL in January (during the wet season) with about 150 mature oocytes each, and males may have well-developed testes at 2.0 cm (0.79 in) TL.

== Habitat & Habits ==
P. oxyptera inhabits rivers with sandy to muddy bottom. This species is a parasite. It forages both during the day and at night, seeking the gill chambers of larger fishes, especially catfishes. It enters and leaves the gill chamber during the host's ventilating movements. There, it feeds on blood drawn from the gill filaments and may stay in the gill chamber for 1–3 min. When gorged with blood, the fish moves to the bottom and buries itself in the sand. A single large catfish tethered on the river bank may feed thousand of these parasitic catfish over a period of up to 6 hours. Large numbers of this fish may kill fishes tethered by fishermen.
