= Apomatoceros =

Conservation status
- Least Concern (IUCN 3.1)

Scientific classification
- Kingdom: Animalia
- Phylum: Chordata
- Class: Actinopterygii
- Order: Siluriformes
- Family: Trichomycteridae
- Subfamily: Stegophilinae
- Genus: Apomatoceros; C. H. Eigenmann, 1922
- Species: A. alleni

Binomial name
- Apomatoceros alleni C. H. Eigenmann, 1922

Genus of fishes

Apomatoceros is a monospecific genus of freshwater ray-finned fish belonging to the family Trichomycteridae, the pencil and parasitic catfishes, and the subfamily Stegophilinae, the parasitic catfishes. The only species in the genus is Apomatoceros alleni. This fish grows to about 14.6 centimetres (5.7 in) SL and originates from the Amazon River. The specific name honours the collector of the type, zoologist William Ray Allen of Indiana University.
