= Stegophilus =

Scientific classification
- Kingdom: Animalia
- Phylum: Chordata
- Class: Actinopterygii
- Order: Siluriformes
- Family: Trichomycteridae
- Subfamily: Stegophilinae
- Genus: Stegophilus; Reinhardt, 1859

Type species
- Stegophilus insidiosus Reinhardt, 1859

Genus of fishes

Stegophilus is a genus of freshwater ray-finned fish belonging to the family Trichomycteridae, the pencil and parasitic catfishes, and the subfamily Stegophilinae, the parasitic catfishes. These catfishes are found in rivers in tropical South America.

== Species ==
Stegophilus contains the following valid species:

- Stegophilus insidiosus Reinhardt, 1859
- Stegophilus panzeri (Ahl, 1931)
- Stegophilus septentrionalis Myers, 1927

S. insidiosus originates from the São Francisco River basin in Brazil, S. panzeri is from the lower Amazon River basin in Brazil, and S. septentrionalis is from Orinoco River basin in Venezuela. Stegophilus species grow to between 4.1–4.4 centimetres (1.6–1.7 in) SL. S. insidiosus is a true parasite living in the gill chambers of larger fishes, including catfishes like Sorubim lima; it uses its strong teeth to bite into the gill filaments to suck the blood.
