= Vandellia (fish) =

- Vandellia cirrhosa

Scientific classification
- Kingdom: Animalia
- Phylum: Chordata
- Class: Actinopterygii
- Order: Siluriformes
- Family: Trichomycteridae
- Subfamily: Vandelliinae
- Genus: Vandellia; Valenciennes, 1846

Type species
- Vandellia cirrhosa Valenciennes, 1846

Synonyms
- Urinophilus C. H. Eigenmann, 1918

Genus of fishes

Vandellia is a genus of freshwater ray-finned fishes belonging to the family Trichomycteridae, the pencil and parasitic catfishes, and the subfamily Vandelliinae, the haematophagic catfishes. The catfishes in this genus are found in South America. The species in this genus are the most well-known of the parasitic catfishes also known as candiru, known for their alleged habit of entering the human urethra.

== Species ==
There are currently three recognized species in this genus:

- Vandellia beccarii di Caporiacco, 1935
- Vandellia cirrhosa Valenciennes, 1846 (Candiru)
- Vandellia sanguinea C. H. Eigenmann, 1917

== Distribution ==
V. beccarii originates from the Orinoco River basin and rivers of The Guianas. V. cirrhosa is distributed in the Amazon Basin. V. sanguinea inhabits the Amazon, Orinoco, and Essequibo River basins.

== Description ==
V. beccarii can be distinguished from other vandelliines by its square or slightly emarginate caudal fin and the colour pattern of two dark bands extending from the dorsal fin and the anal fin and converging onto the caudal fin. V. sanguinea may grow to 5.3 centimetres (2.1 in) SL. V. cirrhosa grows up to 17.0 cm (6.7 in) SL.

== Ecology ==
These species are hematophagous (blood-consuming) parasites, like all other members of the subfamily Vandelliinae. V. cirrhosa uses visual and chemo-sensory orientation to find potential hosts. It is active both during the daytime and nighttime while foraging. V. cirrhosa enters the gill chambers of larger fish to suck blood. It bites mostly at the ventral or dorsal aorta arteries, and the blood is pumped into its gut by the host's blood pressure; it does not need any special sucking or pumping mechanism to quickly engorge itself with blood, but simply uses its needle-like teeth to make an incision in an artery. V. cirrhosa is able to engorge itself enormously; the ingested blood is visible through the swollen belly. Some kind of valve or sphincter is likely present to prevent reflux of ingested blood. The time required to engorge itself with blood and leave the host's gill chamber ranges from 30–145 seconds. Some host fish species (Colossoma macropomum) are able to hamper the attacks of V. cirrhosa by pressing the fish under the bony gill-cover flap, or by using its pectoral fin to press it against the flank or to sweep it from the gill-cover edge. V. cirrhosa is reputed to be able to enter the urethra of humans urinating under water; presumably it mistakes the urea for water exhausted from gills, however this has never been clinically proven.

When inactive, V. cirrhosa burrows in sandy or soft, muddy bottoms. V. beccarii has been captured free-swimming.
