= Megalocentor =

Conservation status
- Least Concern (IUCN 3.1)

Scientific classification
- Kingdom: Animalia
- Phylum: Chordata
- Class: Actinopterygii
- Order: Siluriformes
- Family: Trichomycteridae
- Subfamily: Stegophilinae
- Genus: Megalocentor de Pinna & Britski, 1991
- Species: M. echthrus

Binomial name
- Megalocentor echthrus de Pinna & Britski, 1991

Monotypic genus of fish

Megalocentor is a monospecific genus of freshwater ray-finned fish belonging to the family Trichomycteridae, the pencil and parasitic catfishes, and the subfamily Stegophilinae, the parasitic catfishes. The only species in the genus is Megalocentor echthrus. This fish grows to about 8.8 centimetres (3.5 in) SL and originates from the Amazon and Orinoco basins.
