= Scleronema (fish) =

Scientific classification
- Kingdom: Animalia
- Phylum: Chordata
- Class: Actinopterygii
- Order: Siluriformes
- Family: Trichomycteridae
- Subfamily: Trichomycterinae
- Genus: Scleronema; C. H. Eigenmann, 1917

Type species
- Scleronema operculatum C. H. Eigenmann, 1917

Synonyms
- Plesioscleronema W. Costa [W. J. E. M.], Sampaio, Giongo, Almeida, Azevedo-Santos & Katz, 2022

Genus of fishes

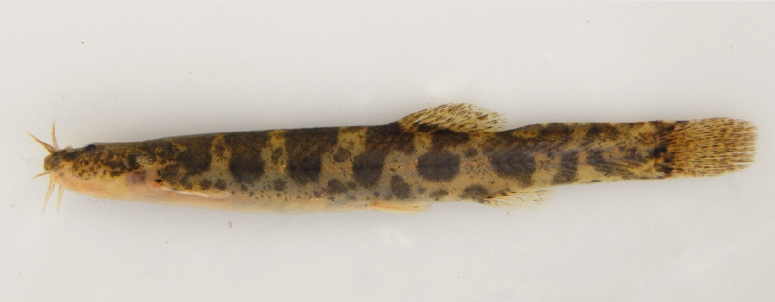
Scleronema minutum

Scleronema is a genus of freshwater ray-finned fish belonging to the family Trichomycteridae, the pencil and parasitic catfishes, these catfishes are found in South America. They are a member of the subfamily Trichomycterinae. Species of Scleronema are geographically distributed in the La Plata basin and Atlantic coastal drainages from Southern Brazil, Southern Paraguay, Northeastern Argentina and Uruguay. They inhabit rivers or streams with sand or gravel-bottoms across the Pampa grasslands. In Greek, Scleronema means "hard thread".

== Species ==
There are currently ten recognized species in this genus:

- Scleronema auromaculatum W. Costa [W. J. E. M.], Sampaio, Giongo, Almeida, Azevedo-Santos & Katz, 2022
- Scleronema carijo Bockmann, Ferrer, Rizzato, Esguícero, Duboc & Ingenito, 2023
- Scleronema guapa Ferrer & Malabarba, 2020
- Scleronema ibirapuita Ferrer & Malabarba, 2020
- Scleronema macanuda Ferrer & Malabarba, 2020
- Scleronema mate Ferrer & Malabarba, 2020
- Scleronema milonga Ferrer & Malabarba, 2020
- Scleronema minutum (Boulenger, 1891)
- Scleronema operculatum C. H. Eigenmann, 1917
- Scleronema teiniagua Ferrer & Malabarba, 2020

S. minutum and S. operculatum both originate from Rio Grande do Sul, Brazil; S. minutum 4.0 cm (1.6 in) SL and S. operculatum 8.0 cm (3.1 in). S. minutum and S. operculatum usually live in a freshwater, tropical environment. S. operculatum are harmless to humans.

=== Scleronema minutum ===
As of 2017, S. minutum, under its synonym S. angustirostris, has been deemed a prohibited nonnative species in Florida, meaning the species is a danger to the ecology, health, and/or welfare of Florida and its residents. Like other species of Scleronema, S. minutum thrive in a freshwater environment and are benthopelagic, meaning that they either live at the surface or bottom of a body of water.
