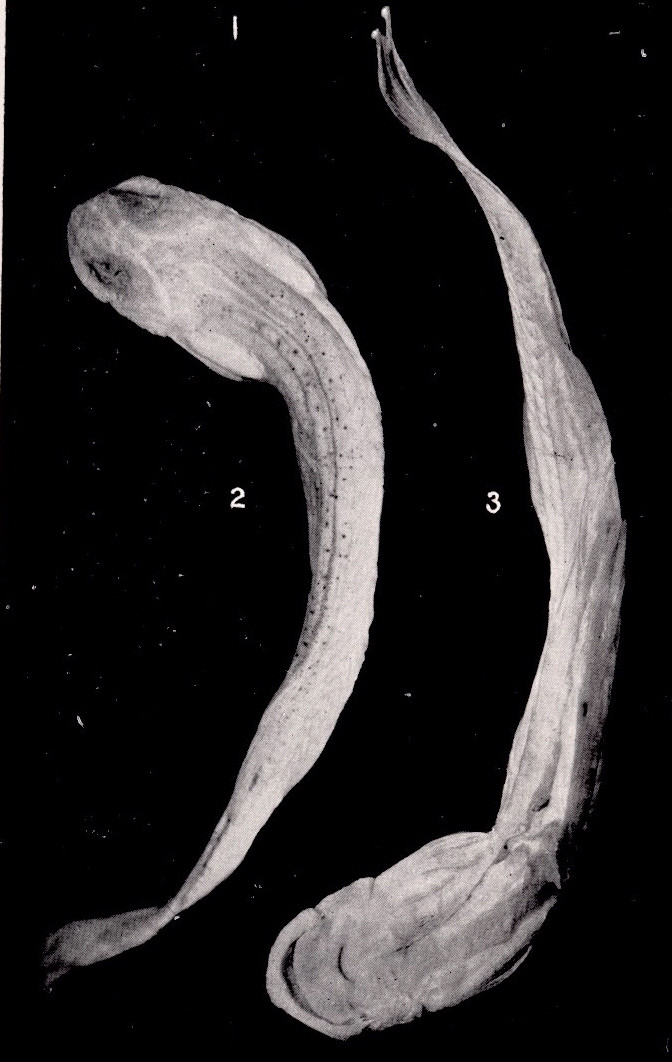
- Homodiaetus anisitsi Eigenmann and Ward (Type)

Scientific classification
- Kingdom: Animalia
- Phylum: Chordata
- Class: Actinopterygii
- Order: Siluriformes
- Family: Trichomycteridae
- Subfamily: Stegophilinae
- Genus: Homodiaetus; C. H. Eigenmann & Ward, 1907

Type species
- Homodiaetus anisitsi Eigenmann & Ward, 1907

= Homodiaetus =

Genus of fishes

Homodiaetus is a genus of freshwater ray-finned fishes belonging to the family Trichomycteridae, the pencil and parasitic catfishes, and the subfamily Stegophilinae, the parasitic catfishes.. These fishes are found in South America.

== Species ==
There are currently four recognized species in this genus:

- Homodiaetus anisitsi C. H. Eigenmann & Ward, 1907
- Homodiaetus banguela Koch, 2002
- Homodiaetus graciosa Koch, 2002
- Homodiaetus passarellii (P. Miranda-Ribeiro, 1944)

== Distribution ==
The distribution of Homodiaetus is restricted to the southeastern South America, from Uruguay to Paraguay Rivers in the west to the coastal drainages of the Rio de Janeiro State, Brazil. H. anisitsi originates from the Paraná-Paraguay River basin. H. banguela inhabits the São João River and H. passarellii is known from coastal basins in the State of Rio de Janeiro. H. graciosa is distributed in coastal basins of southeastern Brazil in states of Paraná and São Paulo.

== Description ==
Homodiaetus is currently distinguished from other genera of Stegophilinae by the combination of the origin of the pelvic fin midlength between the tip of the snout and the caudal-fin origin, the opercle with three or more odontodes, and the gill membranes confluent with the isthmus. Homodiaetus species are small and grow up to 42 millimetres (1.7 in) SL. They are transparent with the except of the head and abdomen. Homodiaetus species have a thin body and depressed head that is almost as wide as the head is long. The dorsal and ventral profiles are straight except for a convex head. The mouth is inferior.

H. anisitsi has three dark bands on its caudal fin, while dark lines are irregular or absent in the other three species. Among the other three species, H. graciosa has 5–6 rows of teeth in the dentary (vs. 6–7 in the other two species). H. graciosa has 7–9 (usually 8) opercular odontodes, H. passarellii has 6–7, and H. banguella has 9.

== Ecology ==
Homodiaetus species are found in lagoons and arenaceous rivers of little depth. These fish are known to be lepidophagous, meaning they feed upon scales.
