= Nematogenys =

Scientific classification
- Kingdom: Animalia
- Phylum: Chordata
- Class: Actinopterygii
- Order: Siluriformes
- Suborder: Loricarioidei
- Family: Nematogenyidae; C. H. Eigenmann, 1927
- Genus: Nematogenys; Girard, 1855

Type species
- Trichomycterus inermis Guichenot 1848

Genus of fishes

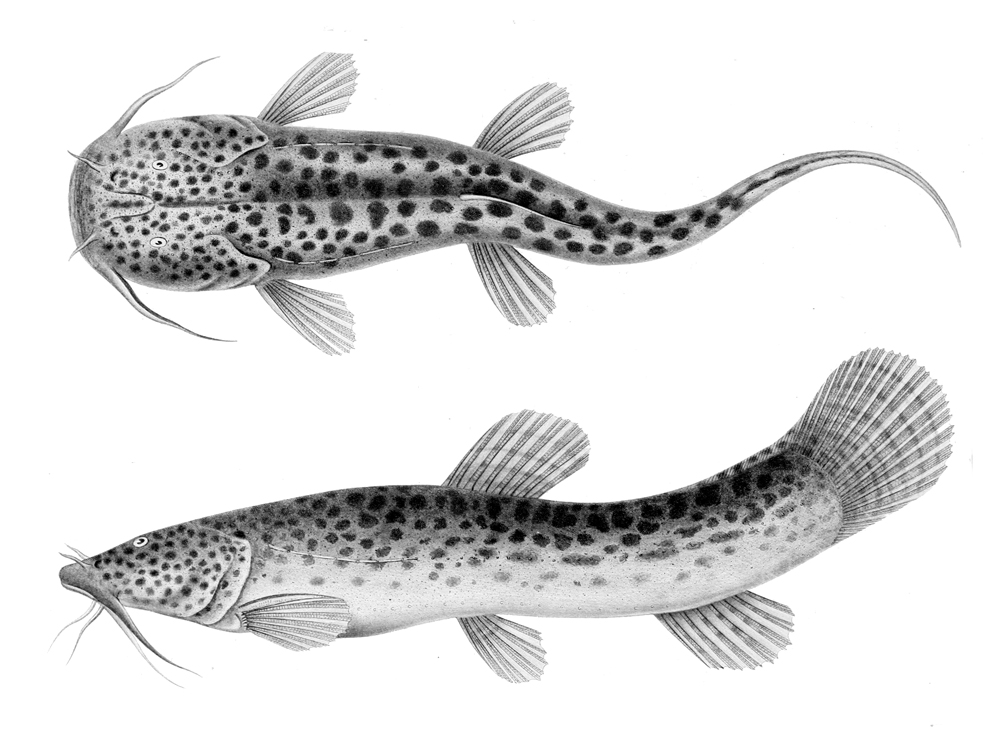

Nematogenys is a genus of freshwater ray-finned fishes, it is the only genus in the family Nematogenyidae. This genus has one extant and one extinct species, both being found only in central Chile.

== Species ==
Nematogenys contains the following species:

- †Nematogenys cuivi Azpelicueta & Rubilar, 1998
- Nematogenys inermis Guichenot, 1848
