= Acanthopoma =

Conservation status
- Least Concern (IUCN 3.1)

Scientific classification
- Kingdom: Animalia
- Phylum: Chordata
- Class: Actinopterygii
- Order: Siluriformes
- Family: Trichomycteridae
- Subfamily: Stegophilinae
- Genus: Acanthopoma; Lütken, 1892
- Species: A. annectens

Binomial name
- Acanthopoma annectens Lütken, 1892

Monotypic genus of fish

Acanthopoma is a monospecific genus of freshwater ray-finned fish belonging to the family Trichomycteridae, the pencil and parasitic catfishes, and the subfamily Stegophilinae, the parasitic catfishes. The only species in the genus is Acanthopoma annectens. This fish grows to about 12 centimetres (4.7 in) SL. It originates from the upper and middle Amazon River, and is known to occur in Brazil, Colombia, Ecuador, and Peru. This species is parasitic, attacking like a leech and leaving wounds all over the fish which it attacks; it spreads a bundle of opercular and inter-opercular spines into the wound and remains there and is difficult to remove. It may invade parts of wading or swimming animals but apparently exist in these passages only for a short while, as they quickly die from a lack of oxygen.
