= Mucophagy =

Feeding on mucus of fishes or invertebrates

Mucophagy (literally "mucus feeding") is defined as the act of feeding on mucus of fishes or invertebrates. Also, it may refer to consumption of mucus or dried mucus in primates.

There are mucophagous parasites, such as some types of sea lice that attach themselves to gill segments of fish. In addition, these mucophages may serve as cleaners of other animals, usually fishes.

Another usage of this term is in reference to the feeding organ rich in mucous cells in which water is pumped, feeding particles get entrapped in mucus, and the latter proceeds into the esophagus.

== See also ==
- Nose picking § Consumption
- Aye-aye, a type of lemur known for its anatomic and behavioral characteristics of mucophagy
