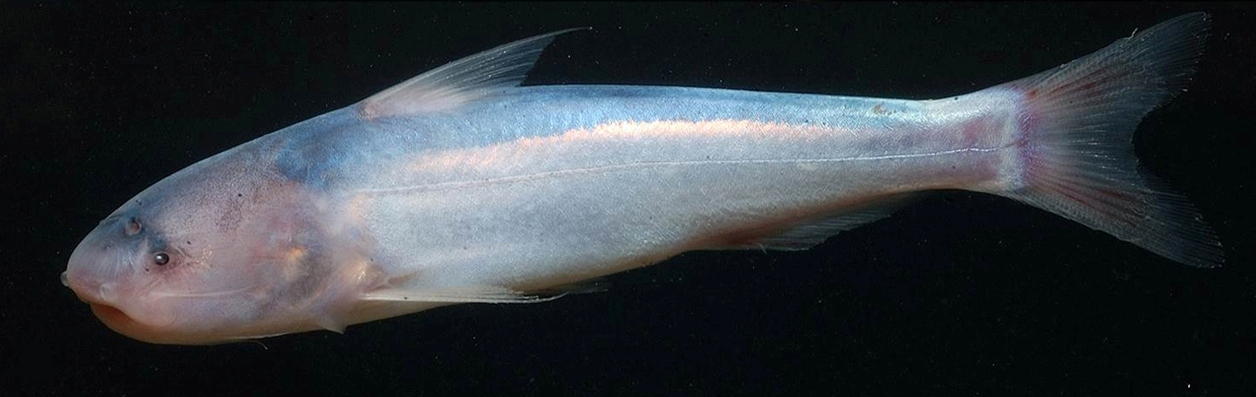
- Cetopsis coecutiens

Scientific classification
- Kingdom: Animalia
- Phylum: Chordata
- Class: Actinopterygii
- Order: Siluriformes
- Family: Cetopsidae
- Subfamily: Cetopsinae
- Genus: Cetopsis; Agassiz, 1829

Type species
- Silurus coecutiens Lichtenstein, 1819

Species
- See text.

Synonyms
- Hemicetopsis Bleeker, 1862; Pseudocetopsis Bleeker, 1862; Bathycetopsis Lundberg & Rapp Py-Daniel, 1994

= Cetopsis =

Genus of fishes

Cetopsis is a genus of freshwater ray-finned fishes belonging to the family Cetopsidae, the whale catfishes. The fishes in this genus are found in South America.

== Taxonomy ==
Cetopsis is one of four genera in the subfamily Cetopsinae within the family Cetopsidae. Cetopsis is greatly expanded from when it only included C. coecutiens. A number of genera were synonymized with Cetopsis to retain monophyly of cetopsine genera without erecting many new ones.

Information on some species is limited due to lack of specimens. C. caiapo, C. jurubidae, C. sarcodes, and C. umbrosa are only known from a single specimen each, C. starnesi is only known from two specimens, C. parma is only known from four, and C. sandrae from only six specimens.

== Distribution ==
Cetopsis species are found in major freshwater rivers draining to the east and west of South America, including the Amazon, Atrato, Madeira, Magdalena, Orinoco, Tocantins, and other rivers in Bolivia, Brazil, Colombia, Ecuador, Peru, and Venezuela.

== Description ==
Cetopsis is distinguished from the other genera in the Cetopsinae from the combination of the absence of a spinelet associated with the dorsal fin, the absence of spines on the dorsal and pectoral fins, and the possession of a single row of teeth on the vomer.

Like most other members of the subfamily Cetopsinae, mature males in most species have the distal ends of the first rays of the dorsal and pectoral fins elongated into filaments and a convex (vs. straight) margin to the anal fin. Unlike all other species, in C. coecutiens, the fin ray filaments are present in both sexes, and this species must be differentiated by the anal fin. In C. oliveirai, the fin ray filaments are much longer than in other species; however, there is also no difference between the sexes in either the fin ray filament lengths or the anal fin margin. The presence of these traits in mature males cannot be confirmed in C. amphiloxa, C. caiapo, C. jurubidae, or C. parma, due to the small number of specimens. The one specimen of C. sarcodes is probably an immature male based on the form of its genital papilla, though it lacks the fin ray elongations and convex anal fin margin of mature males.

Colour patterns vary between species. C. amphiloxa has very small spots on the dorsal and lateral surfaces of the body, while C. montana, C. plumbea, C. starnesi, and C. umbrosa have eye-sized spots on the lateral surfaces of the body. C. arcana, C. caiapo, C. orinoco, C. parma, and C. sarcodes have a dark humeral spot (a spot in the shoulder region). C. arcana, C. montana, C. pearsoni, C. sandrae, C. starnesi, and C. umbrosa have a posteriorly rounded, variably developed, bilobed patch of dark pigmentation at the base of the caudal fin. C. fimbriata have a band of dark pigmentation along the distal portions of the anal fin. C. motatanensis has a caudal fin darkly pigmented throughout other than a narrow pale distal margin, while C. orinoco has dark pigmentation on the caudal fin, particularly on the distal portions of the fin.

The body of Cetopsis species ranges from slender to stout. Unlike all other species, C. candiru has incisiform (vs. conical) teeth on the vomer and dentary, and also has a more slender body than all other species. Unlike all other species, C. coecutiens has transverse, slit-like posterior nares rather than rounded posterior nares. The eye is completely absent in C. oliveirai; the eye, present to some degree in all other species of Cetopsis, is situated on the lateral surface of the head, and is visible from above but not below. In most species, the mouth is inferior and the width is one-half the length of the head; the margin of the lower jaw is often gently to broadly rounded. The mental barbels are almost always approximately the same size and length to each other, and often the same length as or sometimes shorter than the slender and short maxillary barbels. In most species, the dorsal fin is moderately large, but in C. caiapo and C. parma, it is relatively small. The caudal fin is shallowly to deeply forked and symmetrical (though apparently asymmetrical in C. jurubidae), the ends of the lobes usually pointed, bluntly pointed, or rounded (however, the tips are damaged in the single specimen of C. umbrosa). The base of the anal fin is moderate to long, though is relatively short in some species. The pelvic fin ranges from short to moderate to large. The pectoral fin length is usually two-thirds of the length of the head.

C. oliveirai has been found to be a paedomorphic species of the genus Cetopsis, with many traits similar to juveniles of C. coecutiens.

== Ecology ==
C. arcana was collected in a karstic region of the upper Tocantins River basin in both epigean (above-ground) and subterranean waters. C. baudoensis has been found in a highly turbid, white-water river over clay bottoms with logs in the main channel and clay and leaves in the lower portions of the quebradas that were tributary to the main river channel. Specimens were collected at depths of 2 m or less and at an elevation of less than 50 m. C. motatanensis is found in swiftly flowing water among rubble to coarse gravel. C. oliveirai originates in white water systems at depths of 2–40 m, and feeds on terrestrial arthropods. C. orinoco reportedly inhabits the middle portions of the water column of high-velocity streams during the night, and hides among submerged branches and other obstructions in the river channel during the day. C. plumbea is reported to feed on a variety of terrestrial and aquatic insects. It inhabits streams with moderate current and a depth of up to 1 m, occurring within such streams in areas over sand substrates but lacking vegetation. C. sandrae was found in riffles in a relatively fast-flowing forest stream, approximately 3–4 m wide and 0.4–0.8 m deep with a small waterfall. C. candiru, commonly known as the Candiru-açu, is perhaps the most formidable species, being a hunter and scavenger of dead and dying fish, which it devours from the inside out using its circular maw of razor-sharp teeth. Featured heavily in River Monsters and BBC's Amazon Abyss, it has been implicated and proven to attack and devour humans, with corpses containing hundreds of fish being recorded in morgues. It is worth noting, however, that humans only become prey of C. candiru when dead or incapacitated, such as when drowned or drunk.

== Species ==
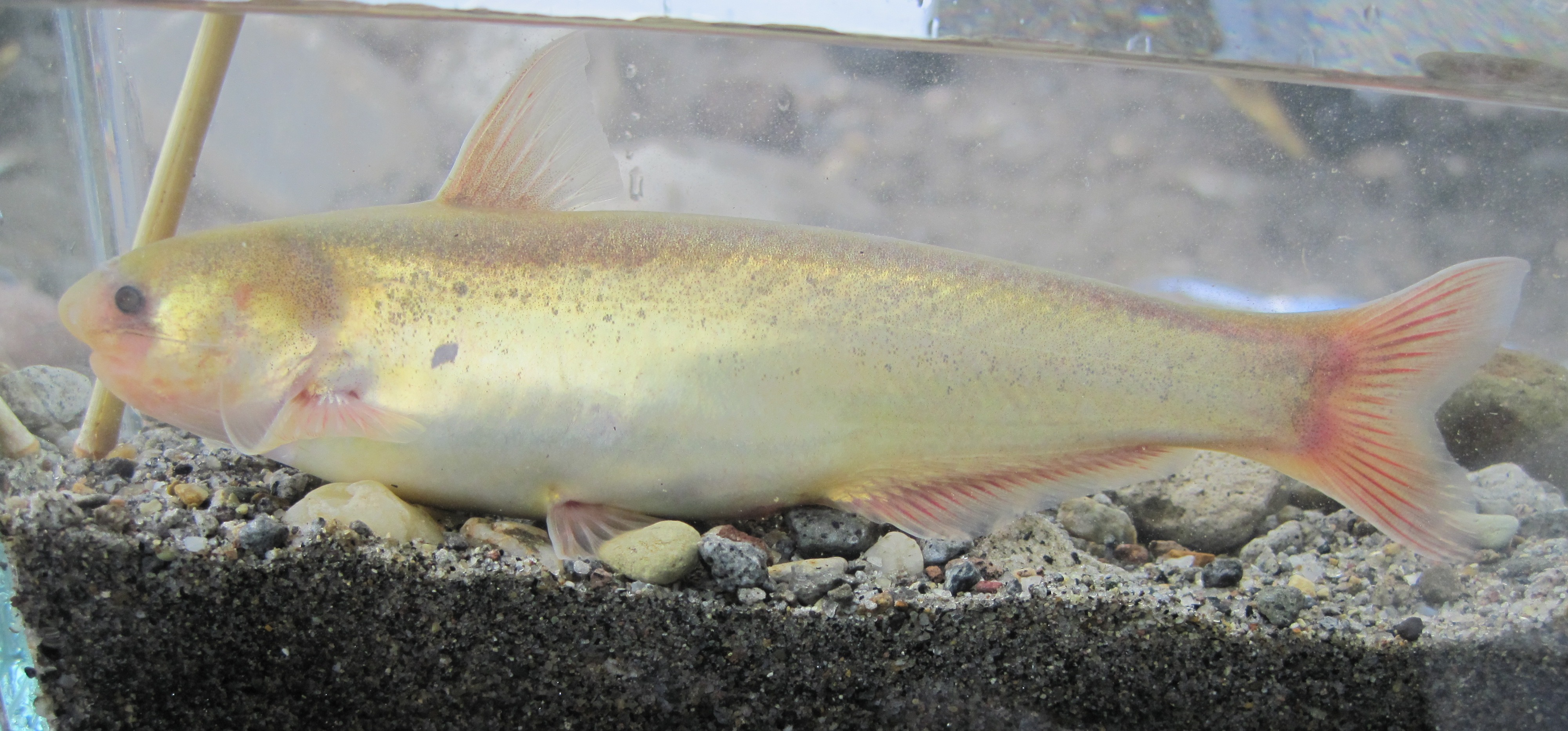
Cetopsis othonops

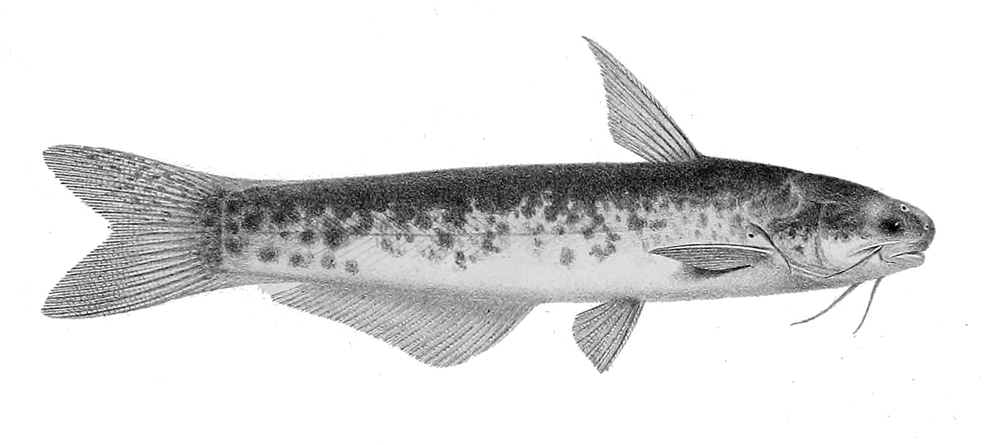
Cetopsis plumbea

There are currently 23 recognized species in this genus:

- Cetopsis amphiloxa (C. H. Eigenmann, 1914)
- Cetopsis arcana Vari, Ferraris & de Pinna, 2005
- Cetopsis aspis Abrahão, Mol & de Pinna, 2019
- Cetopsis baudoensis (Dahl, 1960)
- Cetopsis caiapo Vari, Ferraris & de Pinna, 2005
- Cetopsis candiru Spix & Agassiz, 1829
- Cetopsis coecutiens (M. H. C. Lichtenstein, 1819)
- Cetopsis fimbriata [Vari, Ferraris & de Pinna, 2005
- Cetopsis gobioides Kner, 1858
- Cetopsis jurubidae (Fowler, 1944)
- Cetopsis montana Vari, Ferraris & de Pinna, 2005
- Cetopsis motatanensis (L. P. Schultz, 1944)
- Cetopsis oliveirai (Lundberg & Rapp Py-Daniel, 1994)
- Cetopsis orinoco (L. P. Schultz, 1944)
- Cetopsis othonops (C. H. Eigenmann, 1912)
- Cetopsis parma J. C. de Oliveira, Vari & Ferraris, 2001
- Cetopsis pearsoni Vari, Ferraris & de Pinna, 2005
- Cetopsis plumbea Steindachner, 1882
- Cetopsis sandrae Vari, Ferraris & de Pinna, 2005
- Cetopsis sarcodes Vari, Ferraris & de Pinna, 2005
- Cetopsis starnesi Vari, Ferraris & de Pinna, 2005
- Cetopsis umbrosa Vari, Ferraris & de Pinna, 2005
- Cetopsis varii Abrahão & de Pinna, 2018
