= Paracanthopoma =

Scientific classification
- Kingdom: Animalia
- Phylum: Chordata
- Class: Actinopterygii
- Order: Siluriformes
- Family: Trichomycteridae
- Subfamily: Vandelliinae
- Genus: Paracanthopoma; Giltay, 1935

Type species
- Paracanthopoma parva Giltay, 1935

Genus of fishes

Paracanthopoma is a genus of freshwater ray-finned fishes belonging to the family Trichomycteridae, the pencil and parasitic catfishes, and the subfamily Vandelliinae, the haematophagic catfishes. The catfishes in this genus are found in South America.

== Species ==
Paracanthopoma contains the following valid species:

- Paracanthopoma ahriman de Pinna & Dagosta, 2022
- Paracanthopoma cangussu Henschel, Katz & W. Costa, 2021
- Paracanthopoma capeta de Pinna & Dagosta, 2022
- Paracanthopoma carrapata de Pinna & Dagosta, 2022
- Paracanthopoma daemon de Pinna & Dagosta, 2022
- Paracanthopoma irritans de Pinna & Dagosta, 2022
- Paracanthopoma malevola de Pinna & Dagosta, 2022
- Paracanthopoma parva Giltay, 1935
- Paracanthopoma saci Dagosta & de Pinna, 2021
- Paracanthopoma satanica de Pinna & Dagosta, 2022
- Paracanthopoma truculenta de Pinna & Dagosta, 2022
