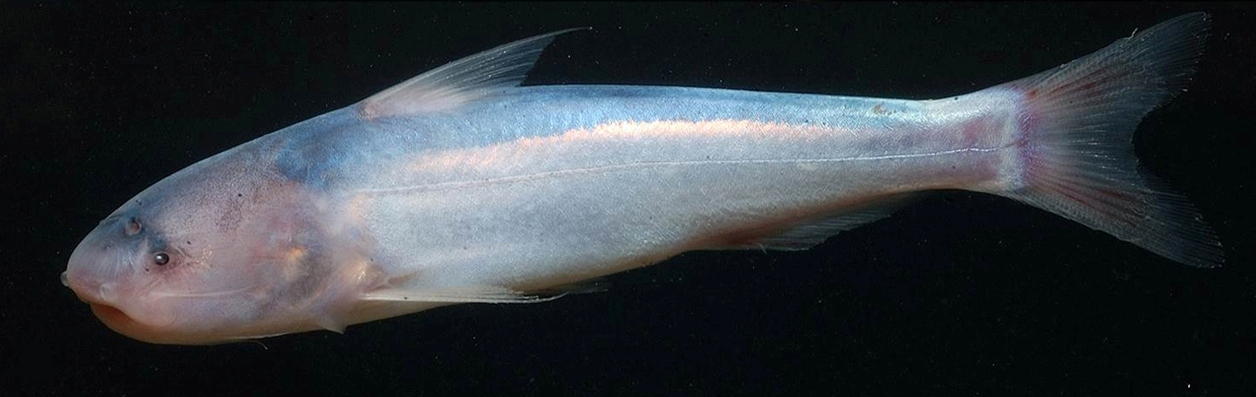

Conservation status
- Least Concern (IUCN 3.1)

Scientific classification
- Kingdom: Animalia
- Phylum: Chordata
- Class: Actinopterygii
- Order: Siluriformes
- Family: Cetopsidae
- Genus: Cetopsis
- Species: C. coecutiens

Binomial name
- Cetopsis coecutiens Liechtenstein, 1819

Synonyms
- Silurus coecutiens Lichtenstein, 1819; Silurus caecutiens Günther, 1864

= Cetopsis coecutiens =

Species of catfish

Cetopsis coecutiens, the candiru-açú, piracatinga, bagre ciego (lit. blind catfish), or the blue whale catfish, is a species of catfish found throughout the Amazon basin in Bolivia, Brazil, Colombia, Peru and Venezuela. The fish was first described by Hinrich Lichtenstein in 1819, who named it for its resemblance to certain cetaceans. C. coecutiens is one of the largest species of "candiru" catfish. While these catfish are reported to grow to a size of 265 millimetres (10.4 in), some specimens greater than 300 millimetres (12 in) have been caught in the wild.

Cetopsis coecutiens closely resembles its sister species, C. candiru, but it may be distinguished from its other relatives through the presence of the eyes, conical teeth, a relatively deep body, filaments on the dorsal and pectoral fins arising from the first fin rays, and dark pigmentation on the previously mentioned fins.

This species is a carnivorous fish and commonly described as a voracious feeder, making use of powerful jaw musculature and a nearly continuous cutting surface of the incisiform dentition. The distributions of both species overlap and both Cetopisis species are known to simultaneously feed on the same bodies. They do however differ in the specifics of their behavior. Cetopsis candiru typically bite into carcasses and twist to create an entry into the body before proceeding to feed from the inside, where they may congregate in vast numbers during feeding frenzies. Due to these habits carcasses that were fed on by C. candiru oftentimes appear almost entirely skeletonized, but retain cartilage, eyeballs and tight skin. Cetopsis coecutiens on the other hand does not remain inside the body and instead will return to it multiple times, each time ripping away chunks of flesh. Both species leave similar circular bitemarks on bodies they scavenged on. They are opportunistic animals, feeding on the carcasses of animals that have drowned or otherwise died and fallen into the water. The role of these fish as important aquatic scavengers is highlighted by their prominent appearance in forensics around the Amazon, being well known to even feed on cadavers found in the various rivers of northern South America.

At least one confirmed report tells of a single Cetopsis attacking a living child, although the exact culprit could not be determined between the two carnivorous species C. candiru and C. coecutiens. Other reports mention Cetopsis candiru feeding on live fish caught in gillnets or hooked by fishermen.

C. coecutiens is occasionally kept in aquariums. The fish will accept frozen food and readily eats live food. A sparsely lit tank is recommended to more closely mimic the fish's natural habitat.
