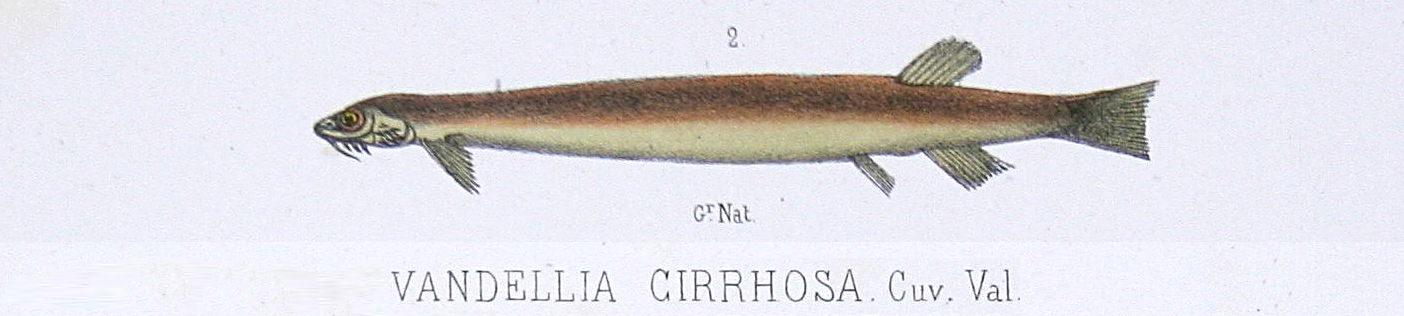
- Vandellia cirrhosa

Scientific classification
- Kingdom: Animalia
- Phylum: Chordata
- Class: Actinopterygii
- Order: Siluriformes
- Family: Trichomycteridae
- Subfamily: Vandelliinae; Bleeker, 1862

Type genus
- Vandellia Valenciennes, 1846

Genera
- see text

= Vandelliinae =

Subfamily of fishes

The Vandelliinae, the hematophagous catfishes, are a subfamily of freshwater ray-finned fishes belonging to the family Trichomycteridae, the pencil and parasitic catfishes. Vandelliines are hematophagous, feeding on the blood of larger fish. Members of this subfamily may be known as candirú, notorious for occasionally entering human bodily orifices, particularly the urethra; no evidence indicates such attacks are anything more than rare and accidental aberrations of the usual feeding behaviour of the parasite — it seems unlikely that it would survive in the human body for long, so such an entry should be disastrous for both parties. In the usual course of events, parasitic vandelliines enter the body cavities of host fishes, feed on blood from gill filaments, and leave again.

Vandelliines usually parasitise ostariophysan fishes such as pimelodids, doradids, and characins. The eyes of Vandelliinae species are relatively large among catfishes, indicating sight may be important in prey detection.

== Genera ==
Vandelliinae contains the following genera:

- Paracanthopoma Giltay, 1935
- Paravandellia A. Miranda-Ribeiro, 1912
- Plectrochilus A. Miranda Ribeiro, 1917
- Vandellia Valenciennes, 1846
