= Tridentinae =

Scientific classification
- Kingdom: Animalia
- Phylum: Chordata
- Class: Actinopterygii
- Order: Siluriformes
- Family: Trichomycteridae
- Subfamily: Tridentinae; C. H. Eigenmann, 1918

Type genus
- Tridens C. H. Eigenmann & R. S. Eigenmann, 1889

Subfamily of fishes

Tridentinae is a subfamily of freshwater ray-finned fishes belonging to the family Trichomycteridae, the pencil and parasitic catfishes. These catfishes are commonly known as the tiny pencil catfishes. The species in this subfamily are found in South America. Tridentinae are characterised by having a very long anal fin which is supported by in excess of 15 fin rays.

== Genera ==
Tridentinae contains the following valid genera:

- Miuroglanis C. H. Eigenmann & R. S. Eigenmann, 1889
- Rhinotridens Datovo, Ochoa, Vita, Presti, Ohara & de Pinna, 2023
- Tridens C. H. Eigenmann & R. S. Eigenmann, 1889
- Tridensimilis Schultz, 1944
- Tridentopsis Myers, 1925
