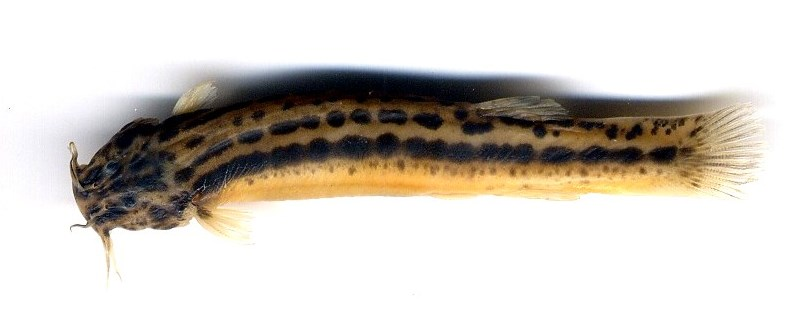
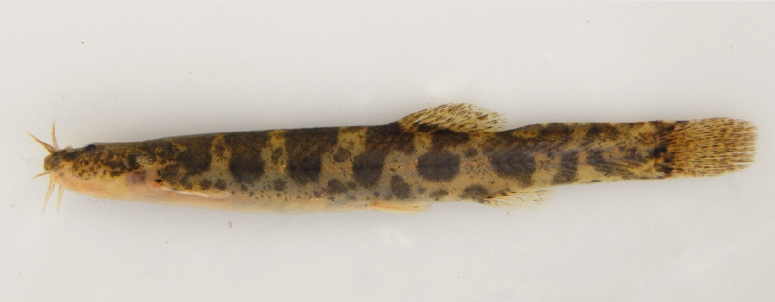
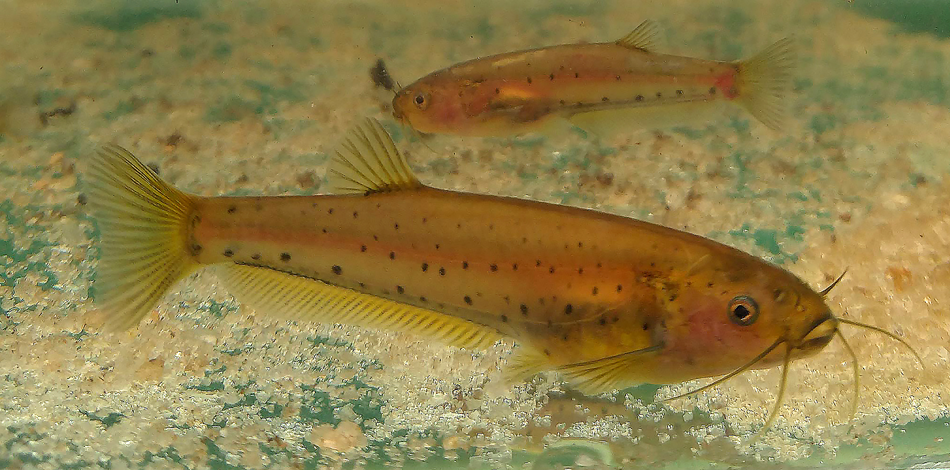
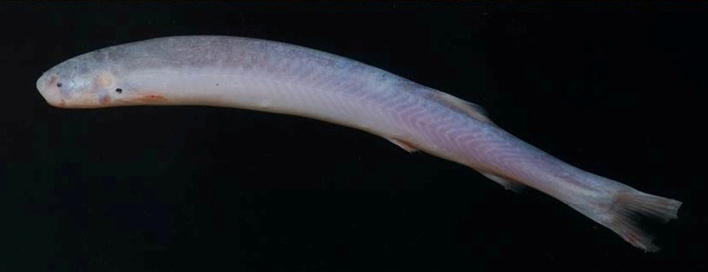
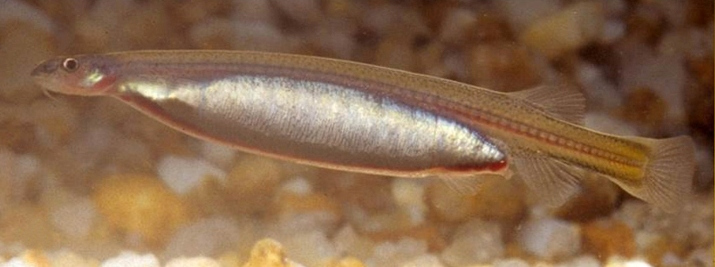
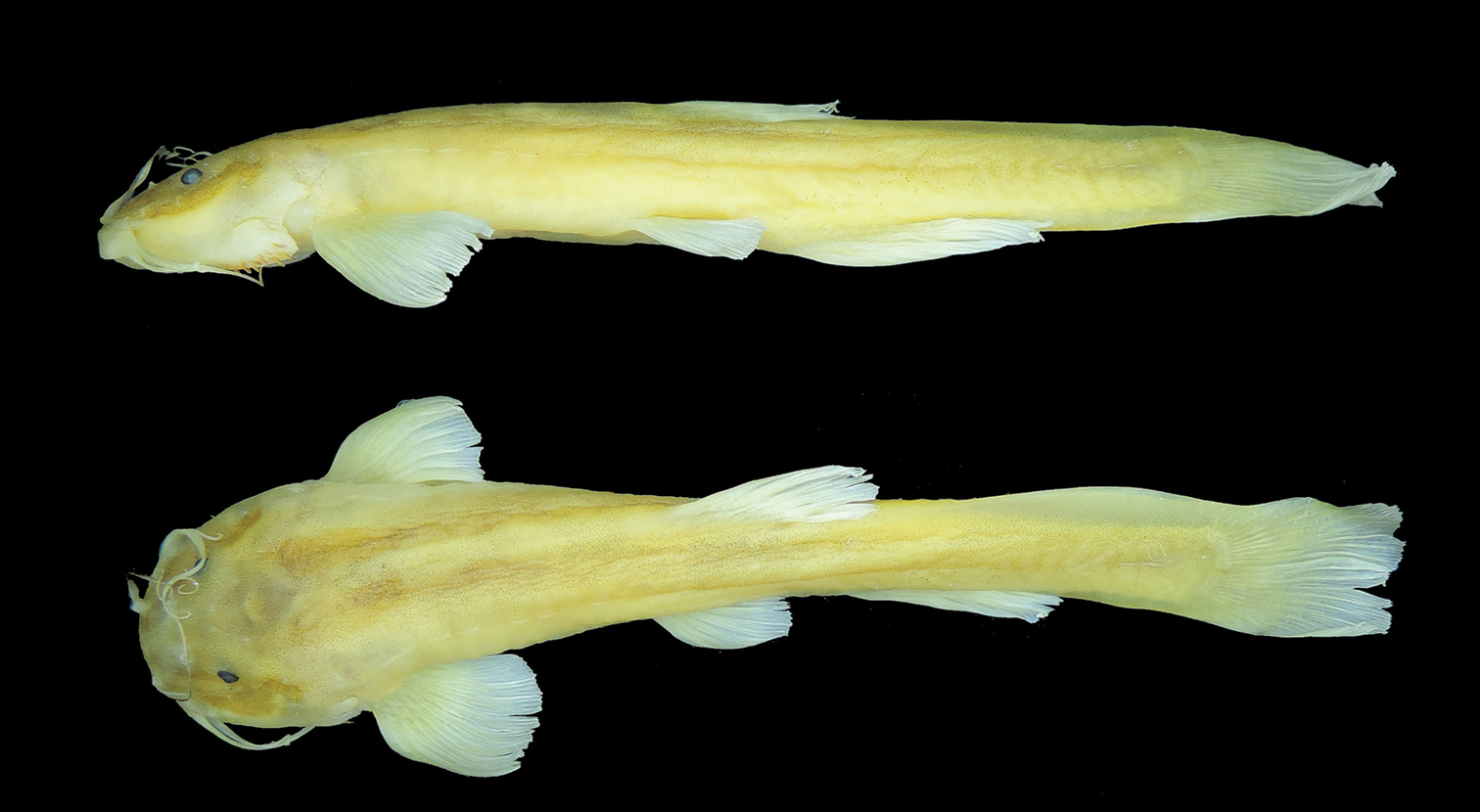
- Members of Trichomycteridae

Scientific classification
- Kingdom: Animalia
- Phylum: Chordata
- Class: Actinopterygii
- Division: Teleostei
- Order: Siluriformes
- Suborder: Loricarioidei
- Family: Trichomycteridae; Bleeker, 1858

Type genus
- Trichomycterus Bleeker, 1858

= Trichomycteridae =

Family of fishes

Trichomycteridae is a family of catfishes commonly known as pencil catfishes or parasitic catfishes; though only certain species are parasitic, those are some of the few parasitic chordates known. This family is prohibited from being imported into various parts of the United States due to their reputation as parasites.

The life monsefuano (Trichomycterus punctulatus) was important to the Moche culture and still an important part of Peruvian cuisine.

== Taxonomy ==
The Trichomycteridae comprise about 42 genera and 286 species described. It is the second-most diverse family of the superfamily Loricarioidea. Numerous species still remain undescribed, such as the human-biting candiru.

The monophyly of Trichomycteridae is well-supported. The family is divided into eight subfamilies. The only subfamily that is not monophyletic is the largest one, Trichomycterinae. A large clade within Trichomycteridae is also suggested that includes the subfamilies Tridentinae, Stegophilinae, Vandelliinae, Sarcoglanidinae and Glanapteryginae (the so-called TSVSG clade); this large clade in turn forms a larger monophyletic group with the two genera Ituglanis and Scleronema. The latter two genera are not classified in any of the subfamilies. In the most recent molecular classification of the family, Glanapteryginae and Sarcoglanidinae were not found to be monophyletic sister clades. Instead species from both subfamilies from the Amazon and Orinoco basins formed the Northwestern clade while species from the Paraguay basin along with the genus Potamoglanis formed the Southeastern clade. The basal subfamilies Copionodontinae and Trichogeninae are sister groups to each other, and together they form a clade that is sister to the rest of the Trichomycteridae.

Subfamilies and genera include:

- Subfamily Copionodontinae de Pinna, 1992
  - Copionodon de Pinna, 1992
  - Glaphyropoma de Pinna, 1992
- Subfamily Glanapteryginae Myers, 1944
  - Glanapteryx Myers, 1927
  - Hyaloglanis de Pinna, V. J. C. Reis & DoNascimiento, 2025
  - Listrura de Pinna, 1988
  - Pygidianops Myers, 1944
  - Salpynx de Pinna, V. J. C. Reis & DoNascimiento, 2025
  - Typhlobelus Myers, 1944
- Subfamily Sarcoglanidinae Myers & Weitzman, 1966
  - Ammoglanis W. J. E. M. Costa, 1994
  - Malacoglanis Myers & Weitzman, 1966
  - Microcambeva W. J. E. M. Costa & Bockmann, 1994
  - Sarcoglanis Myers & Weitzman, 1966
  - Stauroglanis de Pinna, 1989
  - Stenolicmus de Pinna & Starnes, 1990
- Subfamily Stegophilinae Günther, 1864
  - Acanthopoma Lütken, 1892
  - Apomatoceros C.H. Eigenmann, 1922
  - Haemomaster Myers, 1927
  - Henonemus C. H. Eigenmann & Ward, 1907
  - Homodiaetus C. H. Eigenmann & Ward, 1907
  - Megalocentor de Pinna & Britski, 1991
  - Ochmacanthus C. H. Eigenmann, 1912
  - Pareiodon Kner, 1855
  - Pseudostegophilus C. H. Eigenmann & R. S. Eigenmann, 1889
  - Schultzichthys Dahl, 1960
  - Stegophilus Reinhardt, 1859
- Subfamily Trichogeninae Isbrücker, 1986
  - Trichogenes Britski & Ortega, 1983
- Subfamily Trichomycterinae Bleeker, 1858
  - Bullockia Arratia, Chang G., Menu-Marque & Rojas M., 1978
  - Cambeva Katz, M. A. Barbosa, Mattos & W. J. E. M. Costa, 2018
  - Eremophilus Humboldt, 1805
  - Hatcheria C. H. Eigenmann, 1909
  - Ituglanis W. J. E. M. Costa & Bockmann, 1993
  - Oreiadoglanis W. J. E. M. Costa & Katz, 2025
  - Rhizosomichthys Miles, 1943
  - Scleronema C. H. Eigenmann, 1917
  - Silvinichthys Arratia, 1998
  - Trichomycterus Valenciennes, 1832
- Subfamily Potamoglanidinae Reis, Lecointre & de Pinna, 2025
  - Potamoglanis Henschel, Mattos, Katz & W. J. E. M. Costa, 2018
- Subfamily Tridentinae C. H. Eigenmann, 1918
  - Miuroglanis C. H. Eigenmann & R. S. Eigenmann, 1889
  - Rhinotridens Datovo, Ochoa, Vita, Presti, Ohara & de Pinna, 2023
  - Tridens C. H. Eigenmann & R. S. Eigenmann, 1889
  - Tridensimilis Schultz, 1944
  - Tridentopsis Myers, 1925
- Subfamily Vandelliinae Bleeker, 1862
  - Paracanthopoma Giltay, 1935
  - Paravandellia Miranda-Ribeiro, 1912
  - Plectrochilus Miranda Ribeiro, 1917
  - Vandellia Valenciennes, 1846

=== Phylogeny ===
The most recent 2020 phylogenic analysis by Luz E.Ochoa and coauthors can be found below:

- Trichomycteridae
  - - Copionodontinae
    - Trichogeninae
  - - Trichomycterinae
    - - Sarcoglanidinae + Glanapteryginae- Southeastern Clade
      - - - Potamoglanis
          - Sarcoglanidinae + Glanapteryginae- Northwestern Clade
        - - Tridentinae
          - - Stegophilinae
            - Vandelliinae

== Distribution ==
Trichomycteridae has the greatest distribution of any catfish family. It is widely distributed throughout the Neotropics. These fish originate from freshwater in Costa Rica, Panama, and throughout South America. The family extends from Panama southward to Chile and Argentina.

== Description ==
The bodies of these fish are normally naked and elongated. The chin barbels are usually absent, nasal barbels are usually present, and there are usually two pairs of maxillary barbels. Most of these fish have no adipose fin, and some also lack pelvic fins.

Many trichomycterids are small enough to be considered "miniaturized" (do not exceed 2.6 cm (1.0 in) SL). Miniaturization occurs in many of the trichomycterid subfamilies, including Trichomycterinae, Glanapteryginae, Vandelliinae (in Paravandellia), Tridentinae, and Sarcoglanidinae. Miniaturization has probably occurred four times in trichomycterid evolution, as the Glanapteryginae and Sarcoglanidinae are closely related and may have a single miniaturized ancestor.

== Ecology ==
Though the family is commonly known as "parasitic catfishes", Trichomycteridae may actually include the widest range of trophic adaptations within any single catfish family. Only the two subfamilies Vandelliinae and Stegophilinae and Tridensimilis of Tridentinae are considered to be parasitic fishes, including the infamous candirú or vampire catfish, feared by some people for its (fictional) habit of entering into the urethra of humans. Apart from the free-living, generalized predators of small invertebrates, trophic modes represented by trichomycterids include the hematophagy (feeding on blood) in Vandelliinae, the lepidophagy (scales) and mucophagy (mucus) in some Stegophilinae and necrophagy (carrion) in others, and partial algivory (algae) in Copiondontinae.

Trichomycteridae include species that are active swimmers (Copionodontinae and Trichogeninae), torrent dwellers (Trichomycterinae), litter leaf dwellers (Ituglanis), and sand dwellers (Glanapteryginae and Sarcoglanidinae). Species may be restricted to elevations above 4000 m (13000 ft) in the Andes, Andean lakes, off-shore coastal islands, lowland species known only from large rapids, leaflitter puddles, and the bottom of torrential rivers. Trichomycterids are one of the most successful groups to occupy cave habitats; it contains 12 hypogean species. Such species include Ituglanis bambui, I. epikarsticus, I. passensis, I. ramiroi, and Silvinichthys bortayro. Six of the hypogean species are of the genus Trichomycterus: Trichomycterus chaberti, T. itacarambiensis, T. santanderensis, T. spelaeus, and T. uisae.
