= Levi-Montalcini =

Levi-Montalcini (pronounced [ˈlɛːvi montalˈtʃiːni]) is the name of an Italian family, combining the surnames of husband Adamo Levi (1867–1932) and wife Adele Montalcini (1879–1963). Three of their children are notable:

- Gino Levi-Montalcini (1902–1974), Italian architect and designer
- Paola Levi-Montalcini (1909–2000), Italian painter
- Rita Levi-Montalcini (1909–2012), Italian neurobiologist and Nobel laureate

== See also ==
- 9722 Levi-Montalcini, a main-belt asteroid
- Levi (surname)
- Montalcino
