= Marisa Mori =

Italian painter (1900–1985)

- Born: Maria Luisa Lurini; March 9, 1900; Florence, Kingdom of Italy
- Died: March 6, 1985 (aged 84); Florence, Italy
- Education: Felice Casorati
- Known for: Painting, drawing, writing
- Movement: Futurism
- Spouse: Mario Mori (m. 1920; died 1943)

Maria Luisa "Marisa" Mori (née Lurini; March 9, 1900 – March 6, 1985) was an Italian painter and scenographer. She was one of many female artists in the Futurism movement.

== Early life and education ==
Marisa Mori was born in Florence as Maria Luisa Lurini. Her father, Mario Lurini, was working for Fondiaria-Sai, an insurance company. Her mother, Edmea Bernini, was a distant descendant of sculptor Gian Lorenzo Bernini. She had one older brother, Gastone Lurini, who died early on in World War I. In 1918 the family moved to Turin, where Marisa appears to have studied briefly under artist Leonardo Bistolfi. Having seen his work, Mori then requested teaching lessons from Felice Casorati, who ran a private school with several artists including Carlo Levi, Paola Levi-Montalcini and Nella Marchesini; she studied under him between 1925 and 1931. In 1920 she married Mario Mori, her cousin. In 1922 their only son, Franco, was born. Mori left her husband and returned to live in Turin in 1924, but was encouraged to return to him by her family in 1932. In 1926 she exhibited her work in a group show at Fondazione Palazzo Bricherasio with other fellow students, including Nella Marchesini, Daphne Mabel Maugham, Paola Levi-Montalcini and Lalla Romano. Casorati's influence on Mori’s work was evident during this period.

Marisa Mori, Divisione meccanica della folla, 1933. Oil on canvas, 71 x 100 cm

== Futurism ==
Mori first became involved with the Futurist movement via her friend Tullio d’Albisola and met Filippo Tommaso Marinetti in 1932. In later interviews, Mori described Marinetti as “not to be taken seriously." Mori was the only woman to contribute to The Futurist Cookbook in 1932 with a recipe called "Italian Breasts in the Sun". She would recreate this work several times as an edible sculpture for experimental banquets across the country. Mori exhibited it in 1933 at the Glorificazione della cucina futurista exhibition in Milan. She was invited to the first National Futurist Exhibition in Rome in 1932. In 1934, 1936, and 1940 she showed at the Venice Biennale. In 1936 she exhibited a painting that is entitled The Physical Ecstasy of Maternity (1936), which is perhaps the only image of childbirth created by a woman artist of the historical avant-gardes. She won a Silver Medal in 1933 for a gesso model made for a film set that was never realised. She became involved in Aeropittura (Aeropainting) practices and experienced acrobatic flight in a biplane over Rome, thanks to F.T. Marinetti who funded this 1934 adventure. In 1937 her work was included in the exhibition Les femmes artistes d'Europe at the Galerie nationale du Jeu de Paume in Paris, which travelled to New York. In the late 1930s, Mori began to question Futurism and its acceptance of fascist Race Laws. When the Levi-Montalcini family fled the Nazi occupation of Turin, her friend Paola Levi-Montalcini contacted Mori for help and the family (including Rita Levi Montalcini and Gino Levi Montalcini) were secretly sheltered by Mori in her home. In 1943, at the eve of the outbreak of Civil War, Mario Mori died.

== Other artistic involvements ==
Mori exhibited with Italian society Pro-Cultura Femminile: a group focused on elevating the cultural production of women. Through the Pro-Cultura Femminile, Mori exhibited in 1930 at the First Exhibition of Female Art and exhibited again in 1932 at the Exhibition of Modern Decorative Female Art. Through the National Association of Professional Women and Artists, Mori was invited to exhibit at several state exhibitions, including the Venice Biennale and the Rome Quadriennale. During the 1930s-1950s, Mori was very active in the Florentine chapter of the International Association of Lyceum Clubs. Mori gave her only recorded lecture to the Florentine Lyceum Club on February 28, 1948, during a conference. This speech was titled "Vita della donna artista" (Life of the Woman Artist) and discussed femininity and motherhood in relation to having a career as a woman artist.

== Later life and death ==
During the war, Mori largely painted still lifes. Her son was arrested and beaten for resistance activity as recorded in her wartime diaries. In 1945 she painted a series of American soldiers who took shelter in her home and recorded the destruction of her city in a number of paintings and drawings. After the war she returned to classical figurative genres, focusing on the nude in particular and taking a course of study with Arturo Cecchi at the Florentine Academy. She exhibited paintings at the VI, VII, VIII Rome Quadriennales. In 1954, she had a solo show at the House of Dante Alighieri in Florence and in 1967 she had what would be her last solo show at the Goois Museum in Hilversum, Netherlands. In the following years Mori fundamentally retired from public life, only appearing sporadically at events such as exhibitions for women artists. Mori died in 1985 in Florence, three days before her 85th birthday. All of her works are in private collections and none belong to museums. Most remain in the possession of the Mori Family Archive.
