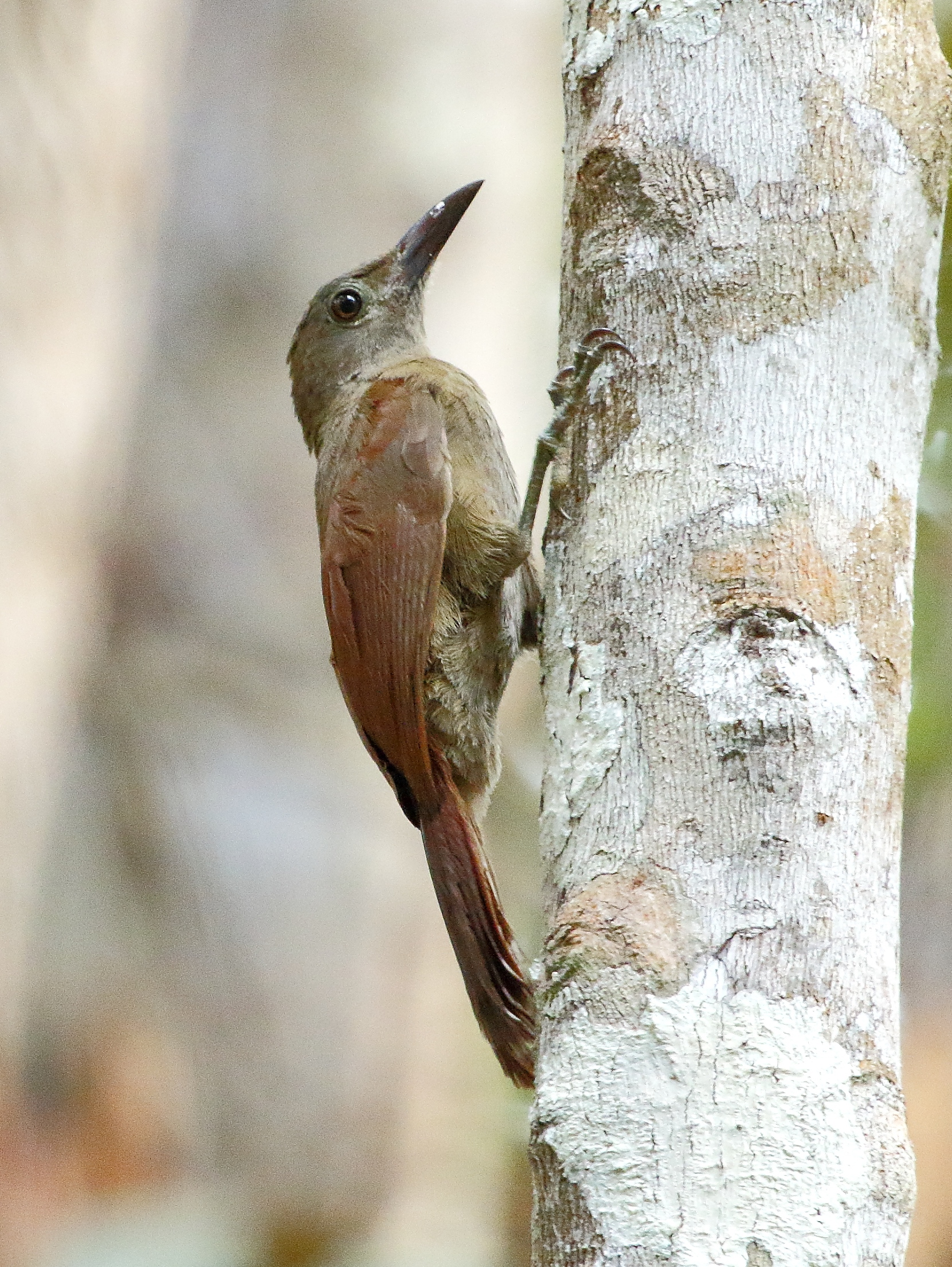

Scientific classification
- Kingdom: Animalia
- Phylum: Chordata
- Class: Aves
- Order: Passeriformes
- Family: Furnariidae
- Genus: Hylexetastes
- Species: H. uniformis
- Subspecies: H. u. brigidai

Trinomial name
- Hylexetastes uniformis brigidai da Silva, Novaes & Oren 1995

Synonyms
- Hylexetastes perrotii brigidai

= Brigida's woodcreeper =

Species of bird

Brigida's woodcreeper (Hylexetastes uniformis brigidai), also known as the Mato Grosso woodcreeper, is a subspecies of bird in the subfamily Dendrocolaptinae of the ovenbird family Furnariidae. It is endemic to Brazil.

== Taxonomy and systematics ==
The taxonomy of Brigida's woodcreeper is unsettled. It was originally described as a monotypic species, H. brigidai, and until July 2023, the International Ornithological Committee (IOC) treated it that way. On that date the IOC reassigned it as a subspecies of the uniform woodcreeper (H. uniformis), joining the nominate subspecies H. u. uniformis. The South American Classification Committee of the American Ornithological Society (SACC) and the Clements taxonomy have long treated it as a uniform woodcreeper subspecies. BirdLife International's Handbook of the Birds of the World (HBW) treats both uniformis and brigidai as subspecies of the red-billed woodcreeper (H. perrotii).
