= Hertha Meyer =

Brazilian biologist (1902–1990)

- Born: 3 May 1902; Germany
- Died: 30 August 1990 (aged 88); Rio de Janeiro, Brazil
- Citizenship: Brazilian
- Education: Lette-Verein
- Known for: Tissue culture Electron microscopy
- Scientific career
- Fields: Cell biology Parasitology
- Workplaces: University of Turin; Oswaldo Cruz Institute; Federal University of Rio de Janeiro
- Patrons: Carlos Chagas Filho

Hertha Meyer (3 May 1902 – 30 August 1990) was a Brazilian biologist and director of the Carlos Chagas Filho Biophysics Institute at the Federal University of Rio de Janeiro. Born in Germany, she was educated in a technical course in infectious diseases in Berlin. Following Jewish persecution under the Nazi regime, she moved to Italy to work under Giuseppe Levi at the University of Turin. As antisemitism rose in Italy, she emigrated to Brazil where she joined the faculty of Oswaldo Cruz Institute. She transferred to the Federal University of Rio de Janeiro to head the Carlos Chagas Filho Biophysics Institute, where a separate laboratory called Laboratório de Ultraestrutura Celular Hertha Meyer (Hertha Meyer Laboratory of Cellular Ultrastructure) was established in her name.

Meyer pioneered the methods of cell culture, specifically useful for protozoan parasites such as Toxoplasma, Plasmodium and Trypanosoma. She developed a method for electron microscopy that was used in the structural description of protozoans and discoveries of cell organelles. Her cell culture method led to the discovery of nerve growth factor, a protein that regulates development and survival of neurones.

== Life and career ==
Meyer was born in Germany. She studied a technical course in infectious diseases at the Lette-Verein training school in Berlin, completing the course in 1921. She was denied higher education in the university due to antisemitic regulations and worked as a technician at the Robert Koch Institute (then called the Royal Prussian Institute for Infectious Diseases) in Berlin. In 1926, she moved to Kaiser Wilhelm Institute in Dalheim to work under Albert Fischer (or more likely Emil Fischer), who trained her in tissue culture. She made her first scientific publication with Fischer in 1928. Between 1930 and 1933, she worked at the clinical laboratory of the University of Berlin. To escape the escalating persecutions of Jews as Hitler's Nazi took over the German government, Meyer moved to Italy in 1933. She managed to find a job of technician at the University of Turin.

In Turin, Meyer was enrolled for a course in cytology of the nervous system and graduated under Giuseppe Levi, professor of human anatomy and pioneer of culturing cells. [It is also possible that she worked for Levi, and was not his student.] There she befriended Levi's students like Renato Dulbecco, Salvador Luria, Rita Levi-Montalcini and Eugenia Sacerdote, all of who turned out to be notable scientists (the first three winning Nobel prizes). Antisemitic restrictions also became stronger in Italy so that Meyer was compelled to emigrate in Brazil in 1937 (or more likely 1939). In Rio de Janeiro, she got a job at the Manguinhos (or Manguinhos-Maré) campus of the Oswaldo Cruz Institute. She used her skills in tissue culture to develop vaccines, especially that of yellow fever from which she came to be noticed by the scientific community.

In 1938, Carlos Chagas Filho, who had become chair of the biological physics at the Oswaldo Cruz Institute a year before, decided to established an independent biophysics laboratory as an "informal" extension of his own research. His focus was to set up a tissue culture laboratory, for which he was able to get financial support from Guilherme Guinle, a banker and a philanthropist, in 1940. He came to learn that Meyer's works were exactly the kind he wanted. Accepting his invitation, Meyer became the official director of his laboratory in 1941. Her ability as a research scientist and head of the laboratory was reflected by a series of research reports by the very next year. However, Filho received a threat from Nazi supporters that his research fund would be suspended if he continued to employ Meyer (mentioned as "an Israeli woman"), which he completely ignored. Meyer's salary was cut off for several months, but Filho fought to restore it. In 1945, the laboratory was recognised as an autonomous research centre, becoming the Biophysics Institute (officially Carlos Chagas Filho Institute of Biophysics) with major funding from the Rockefeller Foundation, and affiliated to the Federal University of Rio de Janeiro. Within a decade, the institute became the "most efficient tissue culture unit" in the world, as Levi-Montalcini put it.

In 1963, she returned to Turin to see a new microcinematography developed by Carl Zeiss. She persuaded Filho to procure one at the Biophysics Institute, and was installed there in 1970 from funds provided by the World Health Organization. For her research contributions, Meyer was awarded Doctor Honoris Causa from the Federal University of Rio de Janeiro in 1980. She was elected to the Brazilian Academy of Sciences, and received the Admiral Álvaro Alberto Award in 1974, Universidade Estácio de Sá award in 1980, and the Oswaldo Cruz Medal in 1982. After her death, her laboratory was renamed Laboratório de Ultraestrutura Celular Hertha Meyer (Hertha Meyer Laboratory of Cellular Ultrastructure).

== Contributions ==
=== Tissue culture technique ===
Unlike other parasites, parasitic protozoans are difficult to study due to their small size and association with blood cells. After the discoveries since late 19th century the nature of their infections and diseases they caused, no advancement was made in laboratory culture for half a century. The first successful culture of any protozoan parasite was achieved by Meyer and her colleague Felipe Nery Guimarães. Meyer and Guimarães worked on Toxoplasma gondii, a protozoan that causes neurological disorders (toxoplasmosis) in a wide range of mammals including humans. After failing with several tissues for maintaining the parasites in culture plates, they used chicken embryos in a Maximow slide which proved to be a success. They reported the study in 1942 in the journal Revista Brasileira de Biologia (later Brazilian Journal of Biology). The procedure made way for further developments of culture methods using various mammalian tissues and cells.

In 1942, Meyer with Cecilio Romaña From the basic method, Meyer was able to develop culture methods for other protozoans including Trypanosoma cruzi (that causes Chagas disease) and Plasmodium gallinaceum (that causes bird malaria). By 1948, she was able to work out the details of the developmental stages of T. cruzi.

=== Electron microscopy of parasites ===
Meyer set up Philips transmission electron microscopy obtained by Filho from the grants of the National Research Council, and with it she was one of the first scientists to effectively use electron microscopy for biological studies. In 1950 (or 1949), she went to Keith R. Porter at the Rockefeller Institute in New York for a research training. Porter had produced electron microscope images of mammalian cells, which inspired Filho to encourage Meyer for the electron microscopy of protozoan parasites. Meyer chose T. cruzi for the project. The research was disappointing as Porter's method of mammalian tissue preparation was not suitable for protozoans even though the cells were smaller. They used the specimens directly from the culture media and treated them in osmium tetroxide and chromium. Only the outline images could be seen, and was anyhow published by them in the journal Parasitology in 1954.

Using the same Porter's method, she and a colleague, I. de Andrade Mendonça at the Biophysics Institute, reported the first image analysis of T. gondii in Parasitology in 1955. The method was clearly not applicable on protozoans, they realised, as the cells were too thick for the electrons to penetrate and give clear images. In 1953, Porter and J. Blum developed an microtome (specifically ultramicrotome) that could cut tissues into extremely thin sections. Realising that it could be the key for the preparation of protozoans, Porter gave Meyer one of the prototypes. It resolved the problem of visualising the opaque structure after dehydrating in alcohol and stabilising (embedding) the specimens in n-butyl methacrylate. Their report in 1957 showed clear pictures of the entire structure of T. gondii. In it they gave the first description of what was later called apicoplast, a cell organelle that distinguishes the phylum Apicomplexa. Using the same method on T. cruzi, her report in Parasitology in 1958 contained the first description of the cell organelle, which was called kinetonucleus but later named kinetoplast, along with the process of fission in which kinetoplast division preceded nuclear and cytoplasmic divisions.

=== Discovery of nerve growth factor ===
Meyer's friend at Turin, Levi-Montalcini was working as a research associate to Viktor Hamburger, German embryologist at Washington University in St. Louis, United States, and was investigating the development of peripheral nerves in chicken embryos. When she removed the growing limbs and transplanted the wing buds in place, she noticed that the degenerated nerves could grow back to normal. Using a tumour cells, mouse sarcoma 180, she induced the growth nerve cell but found that the tumour cells did not actually make any contact with the nerve fibres, indicating that they release some sort of signalling molecules. With Hamburger, she reported the findings in 1951 in Journal of Experimental Zoology. After several failed attempts to identify the unknown agent, she realised that only sophisticated cell culture would reveal the mysterious molecule, and she did not have that facility. She knew Meyer's laboratory was the only place able to do the experiments.

In 1952, Levi-Montalcini took a flight to Rio de Janeiro, smuggling two mice bearing sarcoma 37 and 180. Her experiment with Meyer was a quick success, both tumour cells did produce growth-promoting molecules. Levi-Montalcini, Meyer and Hamburger published the discovery in 1954 in Cancer Research, drawing the conclusion:

It is concluded that the mouse sarcomas tested produce a diffusible agent which strongly promotes the nerve fiber outgrowth of ganglia. The results obtained in vitro are compared to previous results obtained by intra-embryonic transplantation of the same sarcomas, and the conclusion is reached that the in vitro and the in vivo effects on the spinal and sympathetic ganglia are due to the same agent.

In 1953, Levi-Montalcini returned to St. Louis and started working with a young biochemist Stanley Cohen, recruited by Hamburger for chemical analysis. With Meyer's help, they were able to set up their own tissue culture equipment, with which they isolated the elusive molecule in a year. They reported the identification of the new molecule, giving it the obvious name nerve growth-stimulating factor (later shortened as nerve growth factor) in 1954. For the discovery, Levi-Montalcini and Cohen received the 1986 Nobel Prize in Physiology or Medicine. Levi-Montalcini never forgot to credit the contributions of Meyer, and later lightheartedly recalled:

The tumor had given a first hint of its existence in St. Louis but it was in Rio de Janeiro that it revealed itself, and it did so in a theatrical and grand way, as if spurred by the bright atmosphere of that explosive and exuberant manifestation of life that is the Carnival in Rio.
