= Glaphyropoma rodriguesi =

Conservation status
- Data Deficient (IUCN 3.1)

Scientific classification
- Kingdom: Animalia
- Phylum: Chordata
- Class: Actinopterygii
- Order: Siluriformes
- Family: Trichomycteridae
- Genus: Glaphyropoma
- Species: G. rodriguesi

Binomial name
- Glaphyropoma rodriguesi de Pinna, 1992

Species of fish

Glaphyropoma rodriguesi is a species of freshwater ray-finned fish belonging to the family Trichomycteridae and the subfamily Copionodontinae, the Chapada pencil catfishes. This fish is endemic to Brazil. This species grows to a length of 5.1 centimetres (2.0 in) SL.

== Etymology ==
The catfish is named in honor of herpetologist Miguel Trefaut Rodrigues (born 1953), of the Universidade de São Paulo, who, along with his students, collected and discovered the first-known specimens of this subfamily from a high-altitude region of north-eastern central Brazil.
