= Copionodon lianae =

Conservation status
- Near Threatened (IUCN 3.1)

Scientific classification
- Kingdom: Animalia
- Phylum: Chordata
- Class: Actinopterygii
- Order: Siluriformes
- Family: Trichomycteridae
- Genus: Copionodon
- Species: C. lianae

Binomial name
- Copionodon lianae Campanario & de Pinna, 2000

Species of catfish

Copionodon lianae is a species of freshwater ray-finned fish belonging to the family Trichomycteridae and the subfamily Copionodontinae, the Chapada pencil catfishes. It is found in the Grisante River, a tributary of the Mucujê River, which is a tributary of the Paraguaçu River in Bahia, Brazil. This species reaches a length of 6.2 cm (2.4 in).

== Etymology ==
The catfish is named in honor of ichthyologist Liana Figueiredo Mendes, of the Universidade Federal do Rio Grande do Norte in Brazil, who collected the type specimens.
