= Glaphyropoma =

Scientific classification
- Kingdom: Animalia
- Phylum: Chordata
- Class: Actinopterygii
- Order: Siluriformes
- Family: Trichomycteridae
- Subfamily: Copionodontinae
- Genus: Glaphyropoma de Pinna, 1992

Type species
- Glaphyropoma rodriguesi de Pinna, 1992

Genus of fishes

Glaphyropoma is a genus of freshwater ray-finned fish belonging to the family Trichomycteridae and the subfamily Copionodontinae, the Chapada pencil catfishes. The fishes in this genus are endemic to Bahia in Brazil.

== Species ==
There are currently two recognized species in this genus:

- Glaphyropoma rodriguesi de Pinna, 1992
- Glaphyropoma spinosum Bichuette, de Pinna & Trajano, 2008

The single synapomorphy proposed for Glaphyropoma is the marked narrowing of the first hypobranchial, giving the hypobranchial a slender shape.

G. rodriguesi grows to about 5.1 centimetres (2.0 in) in standard length and originates from the Mucujê River, a tributary of the Paraguaçu River in Brazil.

G. spinosum is known to grow as large as 5.8 cm (2.3 in) in standard length. It is known from subterranean waters in the Diamantina Plateau of the Bahia State in central northeastern Brazil. This is the first-known troglomorphic species in the subfamily Copionodontinae. These fish live in quartzitic caves formed by erosion by rain. The water depth in the creek where the catfish live varies mostly between 10 and 50 cm (4 and 20 in), with moderate current and some spotty accumulation of plant debris where fish are found foraging.
