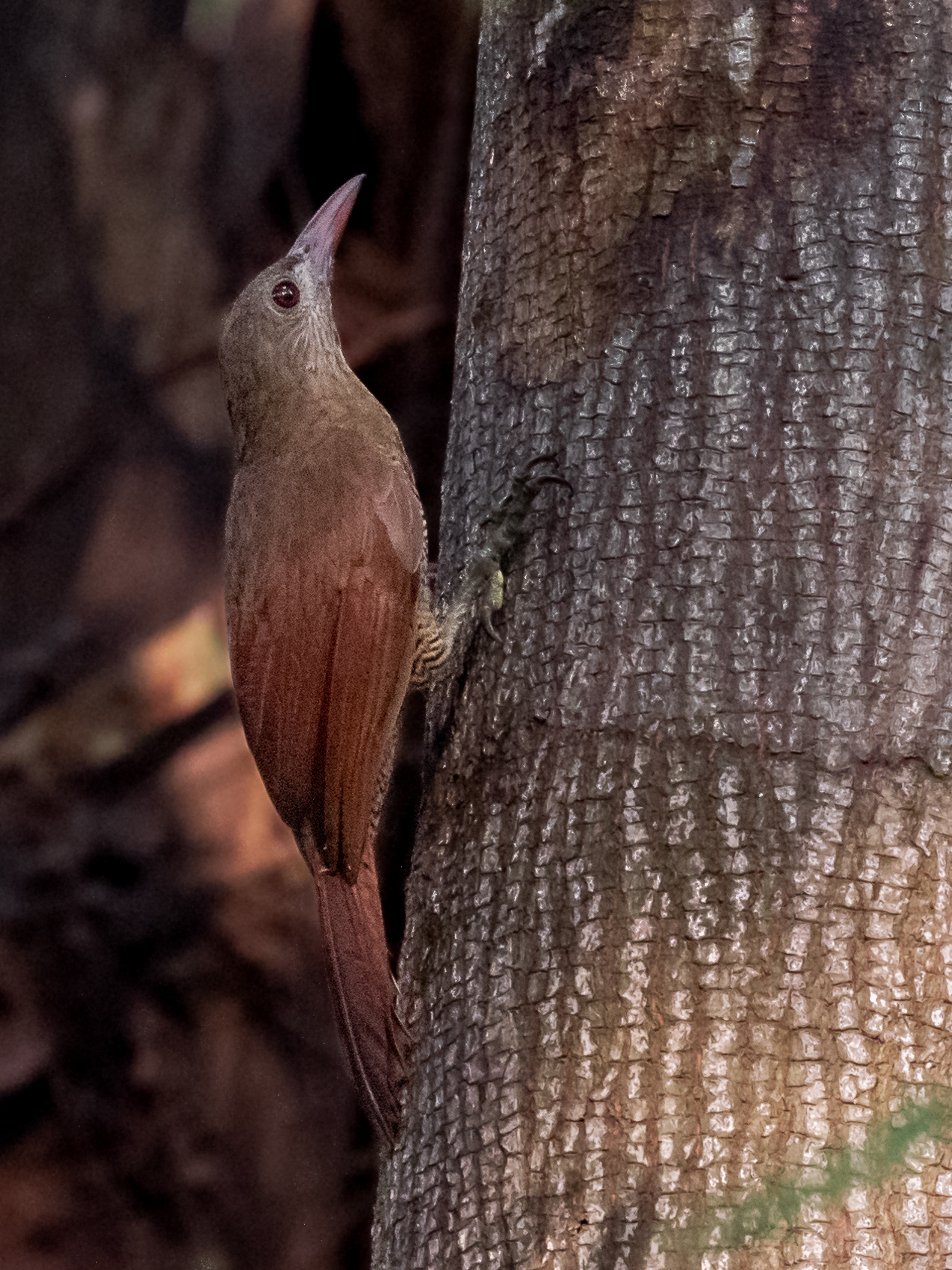

Conservation status
- Least Concern (IUCN 3.1)

Scientific classification
- Kingdom: Animalia
- Phylum: Chordata
- Class: Aves
- Order: Passeriformes
- Family: Furnariidae
- Genus: Hylexetastes
- Species: H. stresemanni

Binomial name
- Hylexetastes stresemanni Snethlage, 1925

= Bar-bellied woodcreeper =

Species of bird

The bar-bellied woodcreeper (Hylexetastes stresemanni) is a species of bird in the subfamily Dendrocolaptinae of the ovenbird family Furnariidae. It is found in Bolivia, Brazil, Colombia, Ecuador, and Peru.

== Taxonomy and systematics ==
Some authors have suggested that the bar-bellied woodcreeper and the red-billed woodcreeper (H. perrotii) are conspecific. The bar-bellied woodcreeper sensu stricto has three subspecies, the nominate H. s. stresemanni (Snethlage, 1925), H. s. insignis (Zimmer, 1934), and H. s. undulatus (Todd, 1925).

== Description ==
The bar-bellied woodcreeper is one of the largest members of its subfamily. It is heavy-bodied, with a shortish tail and a short and massive bill. It is 28 to 30 cm (11 to 12 in) long. Males weigh 114 to 125 g (4.0 to 4.4 oz) and females about 100 g (3.5 oz). The sexes have the same plumage. Adults of the nominate subspecies have brown to olive-brown head, upper back, and wing coverts, with pale streaks on the forehead. Their face is plain but for paler lores. Their lower back, wings, and tail are rufous-chestnut with darker tips on the primaries. Their throat is whitish with heavy dark streaks, their upper breast olive with pale black-bordered streaks, their lower breast plain olive, and their belly and undertail coverts olive with thin blackish bars. Their iris is red-brown to bright brown, their bill dark reddish to reddish brown, and their legs and feet grayish green to dusky. Juveniles have a more rufous back than adults, a mix of streaks and bars on the throat and breast, and a more brownish bill.

The other two subspecies have somewhat subtle color differences from the nominate. H. s. insignis is more olivaceous on its upperparts, has no streaks on the forehead and no black on the breast streaks, has a pale moustacial stripe, and has weaker barring on the underparts. H. s. undulatus is larger than the nominate, has no forehead streaks, is slightly more olivaceous and less reddish on its underparts, and has bolder barring on its belly.

== Distribution and habitat ==
Subspecies H. s. insignis of the bar-bellied woodcreeper has a limited range north of the Rio Vaupés in extreme northwestern Brazil and extreme southeastern Colombia. The nominate H. s. stresemanni is found in the northwestern Amazon Basin of Brazil between the Rio Negro and the upper Amazon River (Rio Solimões) and west slightly into far eastern Ecuador. H. s. undulatus is found in southwestern Amazonia south of the Amazon River in eastern Peru, northern Bolivia, and Brazil at least as far east as the Rio Purus and possibly to the Rio Madeira.

The bar-bellied woodcreeper inhabits humid lowland forest. In Colombia it apparently is restricted to terra firme but elsewhere occurs in it and in floodplain forest. It favors the interior of primary forest but is thought to also occur at its edges and in mature secondary forest. In elevation it ranges only as high as about 300 m (980 ft) above sea level.

== Behavior ==
=== Movement ===
The bar-bellied woodcreeper is a year-round resident throughout its range.

=== Feeding ===
The bar-bellied woodcreeper's diet and foraging behavior are not well known. It is believed to follow army ant swarms and occasionally join mixed species feeding flocks. It apparently forages by sallies from a vertical perch, fairly low when attending ant swarms and up to the subcanopy elsewhere. Its diet is known to include small insects and is suspected to also include larger arthropods.

=== Breeding ===
Nothing is known about the bar-bellied woodcreeper's breeding biology.

=== Vocalization ===
The bar-bellied woodcreeper sings almost entirely at first light. its song is "a loud and somewhat shrill series of 4–6 almost disyllabic 'shu-reeet' whistles roughly on same pitch".

== Status ==
The IUCN has assessed the bar-bellied woodcreeper as being of Least Concern. It has a very large range but its population size is not known and is believed to be decreasing. No immediate threats have been identified. It is "probably uncommon to rare, but occurs in one of the regions of Amazonia that is best-preserved and least known ornithologically." It its thought to be "highly sensitive to human disturbance" and "[p]ossibly merits reassessment of conservation status as Near-threatened, or even Vulnerable."
