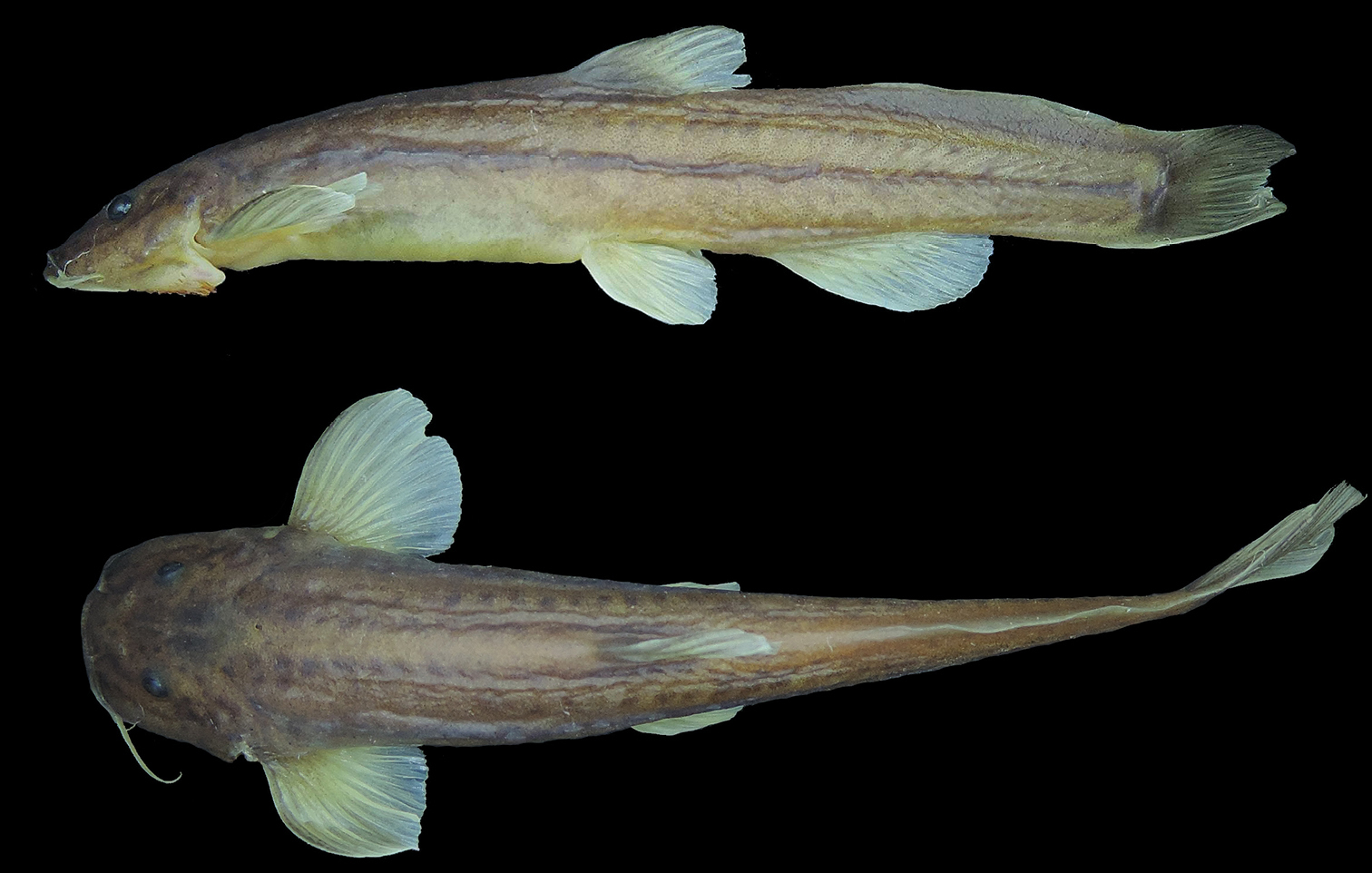

Conservation status
- Near Threatened (IUCN 3.1)

Scientific classification
- Kingdom: Animalia
- Phylum: Chordata
- Class: Actinopterygii
- Order: Siluriformes
- Family: Trichomycteridae
- Genus: Copionodon
- Species: C. pecten

Binomial name
- Copionodon pecten de Pinna, 1992

= Copionodon pecten =

Species of catfish

Copionodon pecten is a species of freshwater ray-finned fish belonging to the family Trichomycteridae and the subfamily Copionodontinae, the Chapada pencil catfishes. It is found in the Mucujê River, a tributary of Paraguaçu River in Bahia, Brazil. This species reaches a length of 6.2 cm (2.4 in).
