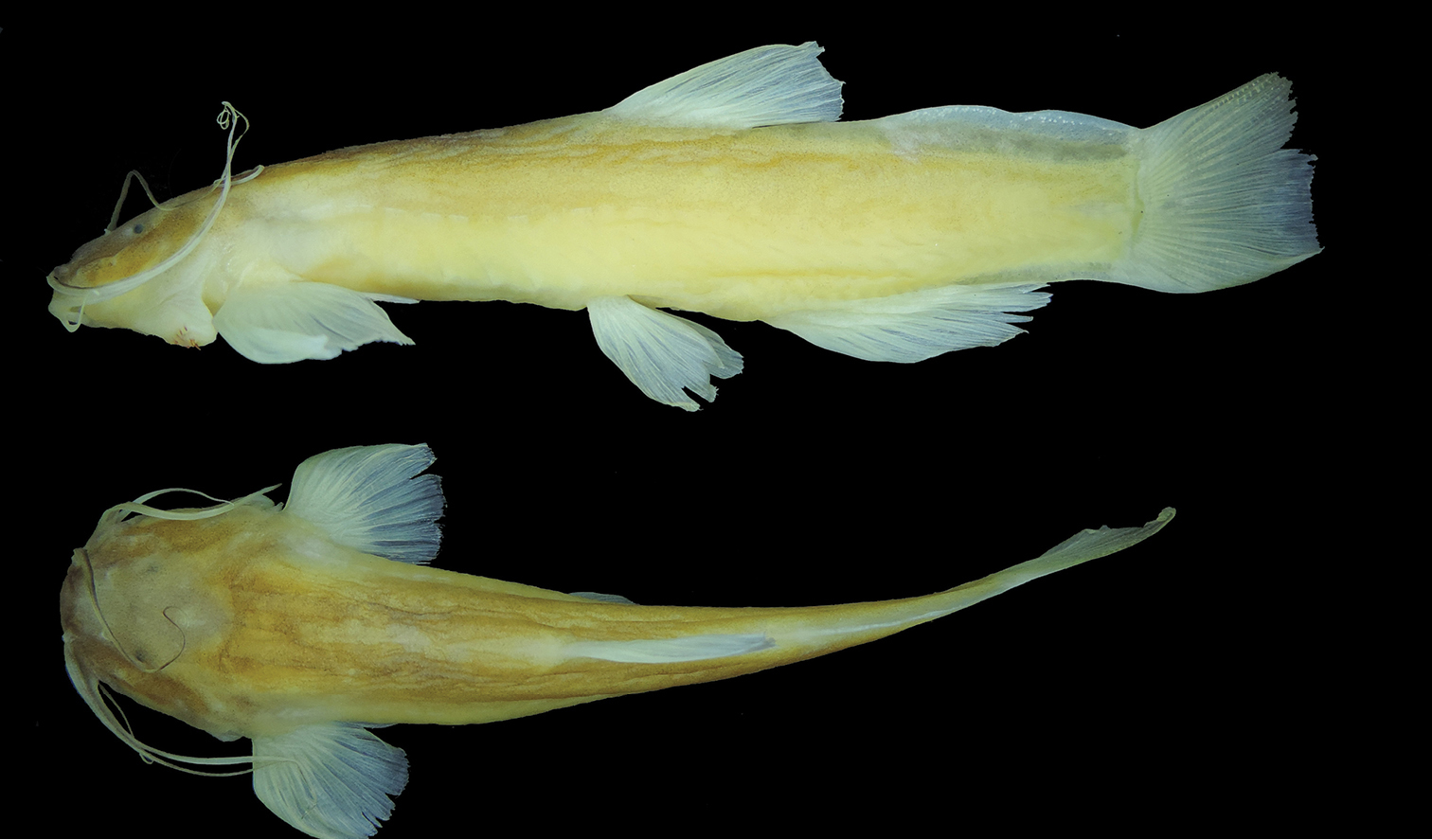

Conservation status
- Vulnerable (IUCN 3.1)

Scientific classification
- Kingdom: Animalia
- Phylum: Chordata
- Class: Actinopterygii
- Order: Siluriformes
- Family: Trichomycteridae
- Genus: Glaphyropoma
- Species: G. spinosum

Binomial name
- Glaphyropoma spinosum Bichuette, de Pinna & Trajano, 2008

= Glaphyropoma spinosum =

Species of fish

Glaphyropoma spinosum is a species of freshwater ray-finned fish belonging to the family Trichomycteridae and the subfamily Copionodontinae, the Chapada pencil catfishes. this species is found in the underground waters of sandstone caves in the regions of Chapada Diamantina, Município de Andaraí, Povoado de Igatu, Gruna dos Torras, Rio Paraguaçu in Bahia, Brazil. This species reaches a length of 5.8 cm (2.3 in).
