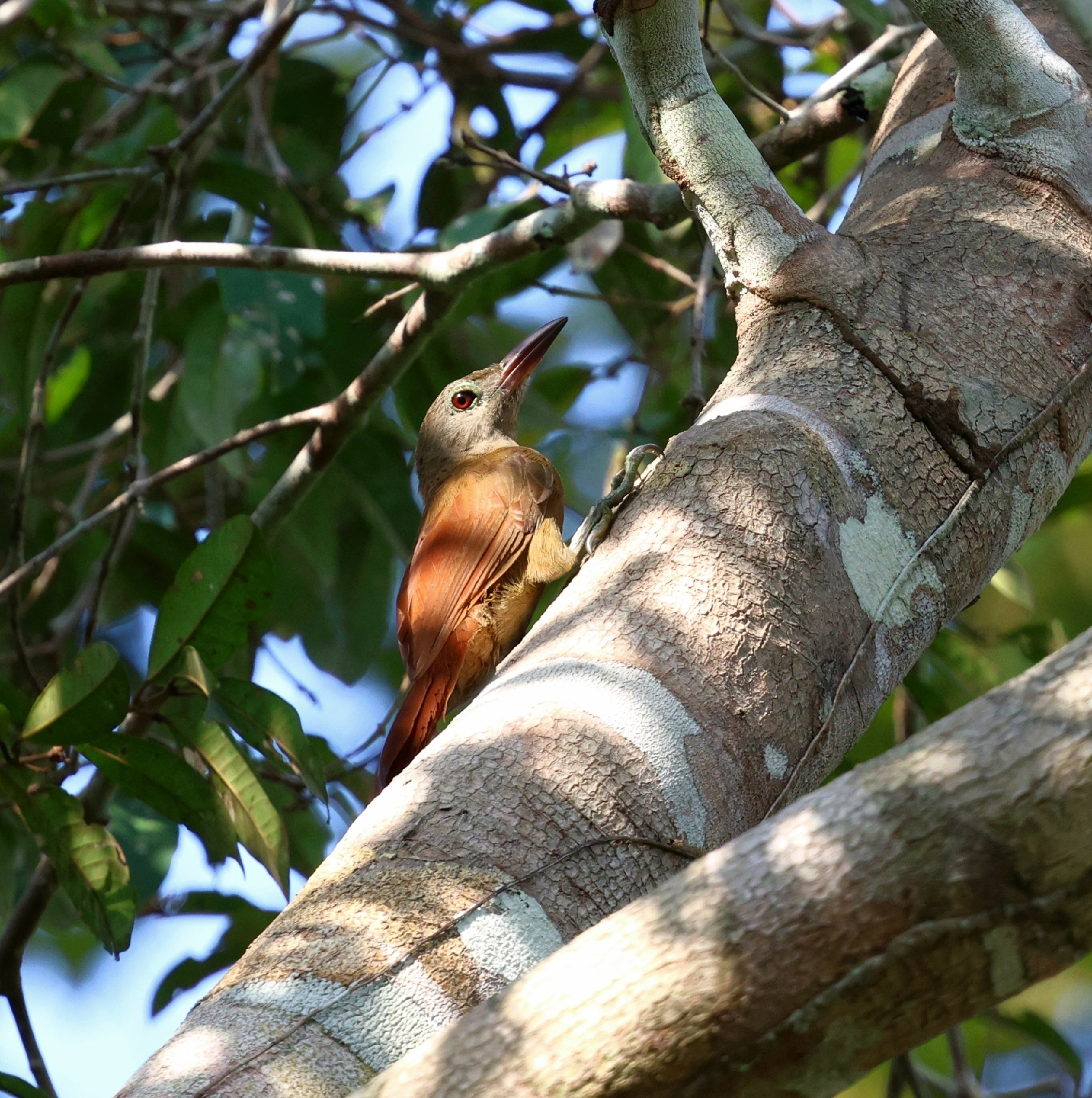

Scientific classification
- Kingdom: Animalia
- Phylum: Chordata
- Class: Aves
- Order: Passeriformes
- Family: Furnariidae
- Genus: Hylexetastes
- Species: H. uniformis

Binomial name
- Hylexetastes uniformis Hellmayr, 1909

Synonyms
- Hylexetastes uniformis

= Uniform woodcreeper =

Species of bird

The uniform woodcreeper (Hylexetastes uniformis) is a species of bird in the subfamily Dendrocolaptinae of the ovenbird family Furnariidae. It is found in Bolivia and Brazil.

== Taxonomy and systematics ==
The uniform woodcreeper's taxonomy is unsettled. The South American Classification Committee of the American Ornithological Society and the Clements taxonomy have long treated it as a species with two subspecies. The International Ornithological Committee (IOC) formerly treated it as a monotypic species. In July 2023 the IOC lumped what had been Brigida's woodcreeper (then H. brigidai) into the uniform woodcreeper in conformance with the other two taxonomic systems. However, BirdLife International's Handbook of the Birds of the World (HBW) treats uniformis and brigidai as subspecies of the red-billed woodcreeper (H. perrotii).

This article follows the two-subspecies model of H. u. uniformis (Hellmayr, 1909) and H. u. brigidai (da Silva, Novaes, & Oren 1995).

== Description ==
The uniform woodcreeper is 25 to 30 cm (9.8 to 12 in) long. Males weigh 86.5 to 121 g (3.1 to 4.3 oz) and females 95 to 118 g (3.4 to 4.2 oz). It is a large and heavy-bodied woodcreeper with a short and massive bill. The sexes are alike. Adults of both subspecies have smoky brown to olive-brown upperparts with bright chestnut to rufous-chestnut wing coverts, flight feathers, rump, and tail. Their breast is a warmer cinnamon-brown and their belly buffy brown; the latter sometimes has some indistinct fine barring. Their iris is brown to reddish brown or even red, their bill wine-red to brownish, and their legs and feet green or olive. Subspecies H. u. brigidai is somewhat larger and heavier-billed than the nominate, but its otherwise differs only in having pale lores.

== Distribution and habitat ==
The nominate subspecies of the uniform woodcreeper is found in the Amazon Basin south of the Amazon River in Brazil between the Madeira and Xingu rivers and south to Mato Grosso state and northeastern Bolivia's Santa Cruz Department. H. u. brigidai is found south of the Amazon from the Xingu River east to the Tocantins and Araguaia rivers. The species primarily inhabits terra firme forest and also occurs in gallery forest and seasonally flooded forest. It is found only rarely in semi-deciduous along the Xingu River. It favors the interior of mature primary forest but also occurs at its edges and in older secondary forest. It mostly occurs at low elevations but reaches 600 m (2,000 ft) in Serra dos Carajás in Brazil's Pará state.

== Behavior ==
=== Movement ===
The uniform woodcreeper is year-round resident throughout its range.

=== Feeding ===
The uniform woodcreeper's diet is mostly arthropods and also includes small vertebrates such as frogs. It often joins mixed-species foraging flocks to feed from the forest's mid-level to the subcanopy. There it gleans prey from trunks and branches. It also follows army ant swarms, where it forages by sallying to the ground from a low perch to capture prey disturbed by the ants.

=== Breeding ===
Little is known about the uniform woodcreeper's breeding biology. Its breeding season appears to include at least June to January. The few known nests were in cavities near the top of large stumps.

=== Vocalization ===
The uniform woodcreeper sings mostly at dawn but sometimes during the day. The nominate subspecies' song is a "loud series of about 6 'Weeah weeah - - weeh' notes", and that of H. u. brigidai is similar. The species' calls include "screee-wip, "nnyeah", "nyip, nyeek, nyeek, weeweweweip", "cag notes", and "whinh, whaih, whaih".

== Status ==
The IUCN follows HBW taxonomy and so has not assessed the uniform woodcreeper separately from the red-billed woodcreeper. It is thought to be uncommon to rare across its range and "[a]ppears to be highly sensitive to habitat modification".
