= Copionodon orthiocarinatus =

Conservation status
- Near Threatened (IUCN 3.1)

Scientific classification
- Kingdom: Animalia
- Phylum: Chordata
- Class: Actinopterygii
- Order: Siluriformes
- Family: Trichomycteridae
- Genus: Copionodon
- Species: C. orthiocarinatus

Binomial name
- Copionodon orthiocarinatus de Pinna, 1992

Species of catfish

Copionodon orthiocarinatus is a species of freshwater ray-finned fish belonging to the family Trichomycteridae and the subfamily Copionodontinae, the Chapada pencil catfishes. It is found in the Mucujê River, a tributary of Paraguaçu River in Bahia, Brazil. This species reaches a length of 7.5 cm (3.0 in).
