= Palazzo Gualino =

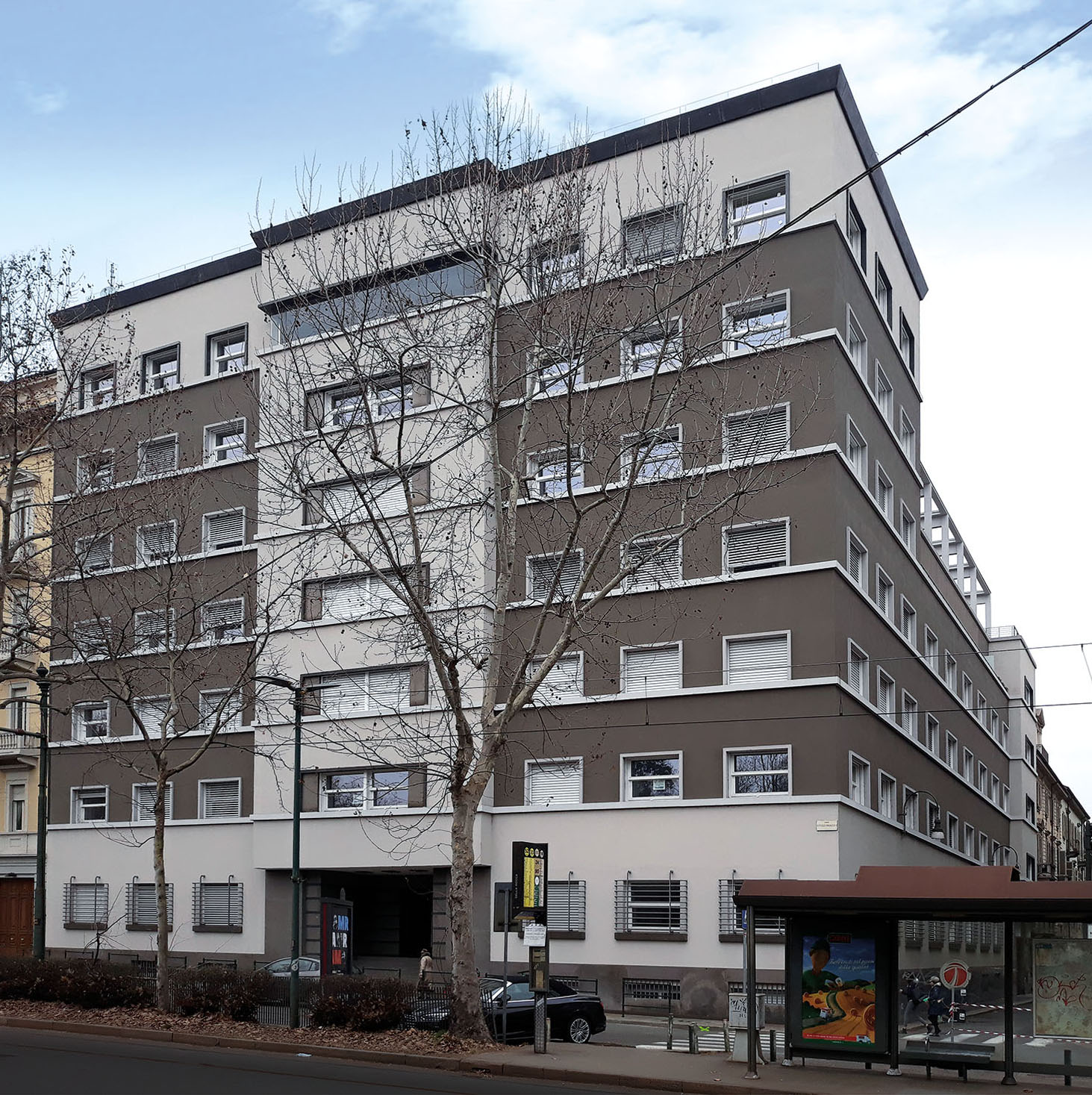
- Palazzo Gualino

- Location within Turin

General information
- Type: Office building
- Architectural style: Rationalist
- Location: Corso Vittorio Emanuele II, 8, Turin, Italy
- Coordinates: 45.059332°N 7.689137°E
- Construction started: 1928
- Completed: 1930
- Owner: Riccardo Gualino

Technical details
- Material: Concrete
- Size: 7,574 square metres (81,530 sq ft) floor area
- Floor count: 7

Design and construction
- Architects: Gino Levi-Montalcini, Giuseppe Pagano

The Palazzo Gualino is a building in Turin, Italy, originally designed as offices and built in 1928–30 for the entrepreneur Riccardo Gualino by the architects Gino Levi-Montalcini and Giuseppe Pagano. It is an important example of early Italian rationalist architecture. The building was used for offices first by Gualino, then by Fiat and finally by the city of Turin, who sold it to a real estate developer in 2012. A project to convert the office building into high-end apartments was begun in 2012, but was abandoned in 2015. The conversion was later restarted and finished in 2019, being renamed Palazzo Novecento.

== Construction ==
The Palazzo Gualino was built for the financier and art patron Riccardo Gualino, who saw the rationalist work of the architect Giuseppe Pagano (1896–1945) in an exhibition in 1928. He commissioned Pagano to build his company's headquarters in Turin on the Corso Vittorio Emanuele. The office building for the Gualino enterprises was built on land formerly occupied by a house called the Villa Gallenga, and part of the earlier building remains as a service structure. The design was based on formal simplification and careful attention to functional and technical needs.

Pagano and Gino Levi-Montalcini (1902–74) built the Palazzo Gualino in 1928–29, with a flat roof rather than the sloped tile roof typical of other buildings in the city. In other ways, the Rationalist design carefully combined modern and traditional features. The building has a symmetrical facade with seven floors on the main front on the Corso Vittorio Emanuele, and five floors on the Via della Rocca. The identical low-stacked floors and the unorthodox but functionally rational horizontal windows convey a sense of efficiency rather than power.

The designs by Pagano covered all aspects of the building's intended use, including the layout, decoration, furniture, and fixtures. The structure is of concrete, with light yellow and green rendering on the facades. Gualino's former offices on the top floor open onto a veranda that looks over the Parco del Valentino. Other innovations included the internal layout, the use of new industrial materials, and the design of all the furnishings.

Magazines and newspapers hailed the building as a symbol of a new direction in architecture, an expression of progress and an example of new ways of organizing offices and management activities. The Palazzo Gualino is considered to be a major statement of the emerging rationalist culture in Italy. The Turin Society of Engineers and Architects recognized the building in 1984 as important both historically and for its artistic value, as one of the first buildings of Italian Rationalism, completely preserved in its interior and finish.

== Changes in ownership ==
Gualino's speculations with the French banker Albert Oustric ran into financial difficulties, and severe problems emerged with his bank during the Great Depression which followed the financial crisis of 1929. In 1930, Gualino was forced sell his share in SNIA Viscosa and many other investments to reduce his debts. His collections of art were dispersed. The Italian premier Benito Mussolini responded to Gualino's failure by saying he had caused "serious harm to the national economy". In January 1931, Gualino was arrested in Turin and sentenced to five years confino, a form of internal exile.

After Gualino was disgraced, the Palazzo Gualino was purchased by Fiat. The Agnellis moved their personal offices to the building, which became one of the Fiat headquarters. In 1988 it became the property of the City of Turin, and housed the city's tax offices. In 2012 the city decided to sell the palace for €14.2 million to help resolve its financial difficulties. It was closed and abandoned when it was purchased by Klg Torino, a subsidiary of Gesco Impressit of Rome. The new owner proposed to transform the building into high-end residential units using a design prepared by Baietto Battiato Bianco of Turin.

== Renovation project ==
The building, under renovation, in April 2018

The plans to convert the Palazzo Gualino were presented in June 2012. There would be four offices on the first floor, three floors of underground garages to accommodate 80 cars, and 35 luxury apartments of 50 to 200 square metres (540 to 2,150 sq ft) on the second to sixth floors. The seventh and highest floor would be a penthouse of 650 square metres (7,000 sq ft). The project required major changes to the interior structure, including excavation for the new underground parking lots. The plan was controversial. The Superintendent of Architectural Heritage insisted on the exterior remaining unchanged apart from the glass "lantern" on the roof of the palace. However, the carefully designed interior would be completely gutted.

The project began with much publicity on 21 June 2012, when the work was expected to last for 24 to 30 months. Work on the internal demolition continued for a year, then was halted. In July 2015, it was reported that the developer was insolvent and the project had been abandoned, with two more years of work still required. The title was under dispute, and the city of Turin was trying to regain possession.

In 2020, it was reported that the residential conversion had been completed between 2017 and 2019, at a cost of approximately €9.6 million.

== Sources ==
- Ghirardo, Diane (15 February 2013). Italy: Modern Architectures in History. Reaktion Books. ISBN 978-1-86189-969-9.
- Guccione, Gabriele (4 July 2015). "La seconda vita di Palazzo Gualino è finita con un crac". La Repubblica (in Italian).
- Jirat-Wasiutyński, Vojtěch (2007). Modern Art and the Idea of the Mediterranean. University of Toronto Press. ISBN 978-0-8020-9170-3.
- Kirk, Terry (2 June 2005). The Architecture of Modern Italy: Visions of Utopia, 1900-Present -. Princeton Architectural Press. ISBN 978-1-56898-436-0.
- "Palazzo Gualino" (in Italian). MuseoTorino.
- "Palazzo Gualino si trasforma". Giornale dell'Architettura (in Italian). Società Editrice Umberto Allemandi & C. spa. 20 June 2012. Archived from the original on 1 January 2015.
- "Riccardo Gualino". Storia e Cultura dell'Industria.
- Spicer, Andrew; McKenna, Anthony; Meir, Christopher (31 July 2014). Beyond the Bottom Line: The Producer in Film and Television Studies. Bloomsbury Publishing. ISBN 978-1-4411-2512-5.
- Vitale, Daniele (Professor of Architectural Design at the Milan Politecnic) (1 July 2012). "Fermiamo la distruzione di palazzo Gualino, una delle principali opere dell'architettura moderna a Torino e in Italia" (in Italian).
