= Mário Cesar Cardoso de Pinna =

Brazilian ichthyologist

Mário César Cardoso de Pinna
- Education: Federal University of Rio de Janeiro; City University of New York
- Known for: Systematics and phylogeny of fishes, especially Siluriformes and Clupeiformes
- Scientific career
- Fields: Ichthyology
- Workplaces: University of São Paulo
- Author abbrev. (zoology): de Pinna

Mário César Cardoso de Pinna is a Brazilian ichthyologist and university professor. He is a full professor at the Museum of Zoology of the University of São Paulo.

== Career ==
De Pinna earned his undergraduate degree in Biology from the Federal University of Rio de Janeiro in 1988, and a doctorate in evolutionary biology from the City University of New York in 1993.

In 2000, he joined the University of São Paulo as a faculty member. His research activities in zoology focus on ichthyology, particularly the systematics and phylogeny of Siluriformes and Clupeiformes. He has also contributed to theoretical systematics and the popularization of evolutionary theory. He has served as an associate researcher at the American Museum of Natural History in New York City and at the Smithsonian Institution in Washington, D.C.. From 2014 to 2015, he was a visiting professor and researcher at the National Museum of Natural History (France) in Paris. De Pinna is an associate editor of the Zoological Journal of the Linnean Society of the Linnean Society of London and Papéis Avulsos de Zoologia, and serves on the editorial boards of the International Journal of Ichthyology and the Revista Brasileira de Zoologia.

== Taxonomic work ==
Together with his colleague Naércio Aquino de Menezes, de Pinna described the new species Pristigaster whiteheadi.

== Selected publications ==
- de Pinna, M. C. C.; Zuanon, J.; Py-Daniel, L. R.; Petry, P. (2017). “A new family of neotropical freshwater fishes from deep fossorial Amazonian habitat, with a reappraisal of morphological characiform phylogeny (Teleostei: Ostariophysi)”. Zoological Journal of the Linnean Society 182 (1): 76–106.
- Menezes, N. A.; de Pinna, M. C. C. (2000). “A new species of Pristigaster, with comments on the genus and redescription of P. cayana (Teleostei: Clupeomorpha: Pristigasteridae)”. Proceedings of the Biological Society of Washington 113 (1): 238–248.

== Selected taxa described ==
- Ammoglanis pulex
- Copionodon
- Copionodon lianae
- Copionodon orthiocarinatus
- Copionodon pecten
- Copionodontinae
- Glaphyropoma rodriguesi
- Glaphyropoma spinosum
- Pristigaster whiteheadi

== Author abbreviation ==
The zoological author abbreviation de Pinna is used to indicate Mário César Cardoso de Pinna as the authority for taxa he described in zoological nomenclature.
