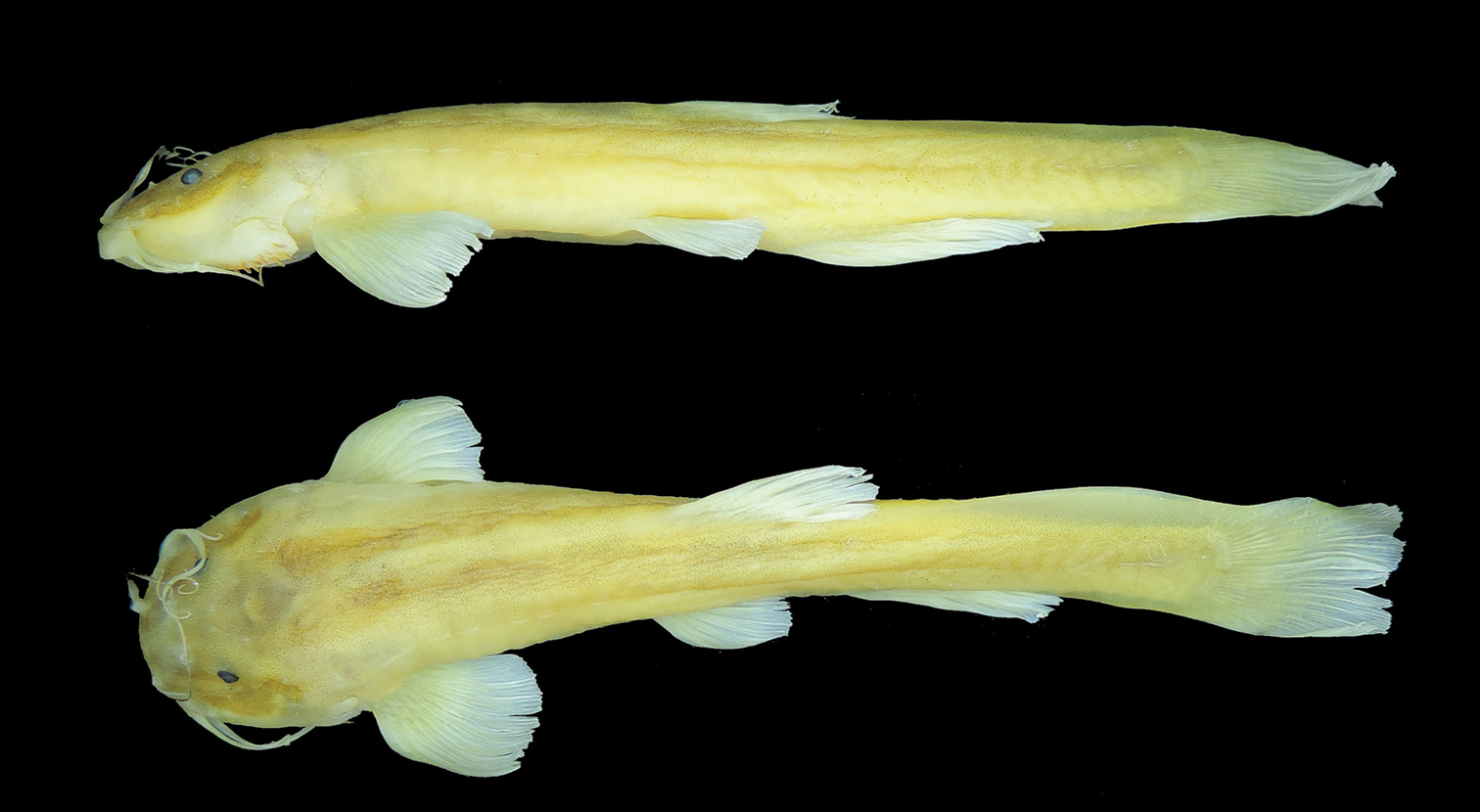

Scientific classification
- Kingdom: Animalia
- Phylum: Chordata
- Class: Actinopterygii
- Order: Siluriformes
- Family: Trichomycteridae
- Subfamily: Copionodontinae
- Genus: Copionodon de Pinna, 1992

Type species
- Copionodon pecten de Pinna, 1992

= Copionodon =

Genus of fishes

Copionodon is a genus of freshwater ray-finned fishes belonging to the family Trichomycteridae and the subfamily Copionodontinae, the Chapada pencil catfishes. These fishes are endemic to Brazil.

== Species ==
There are currently five recognized species in this genus:

- Copionodon elysium de Pinna, Burger & Zanata, 2018
- Copionodon exotatos de Pinna, Abrahão, Reis & Zanata, 2018
- Copionodon lianae Campanario & de Pinna, 2000
- Copionodon orthiocarinatus de Pinna, 1992
- Copionodon pecten de Pinna, 1992

== Distribution ==
C. orthiocarinatus and C. pecten originate from the Mucujê River, a tributary of Paraguaçu River in Bahia, Brazil. C. lianae originates from the Grisante River, a tributary of the Mucujê River.

== Description ==
Copionodon species grow to about 3.8–6.2 centimetres (1.5–2.4 inches) SL.
