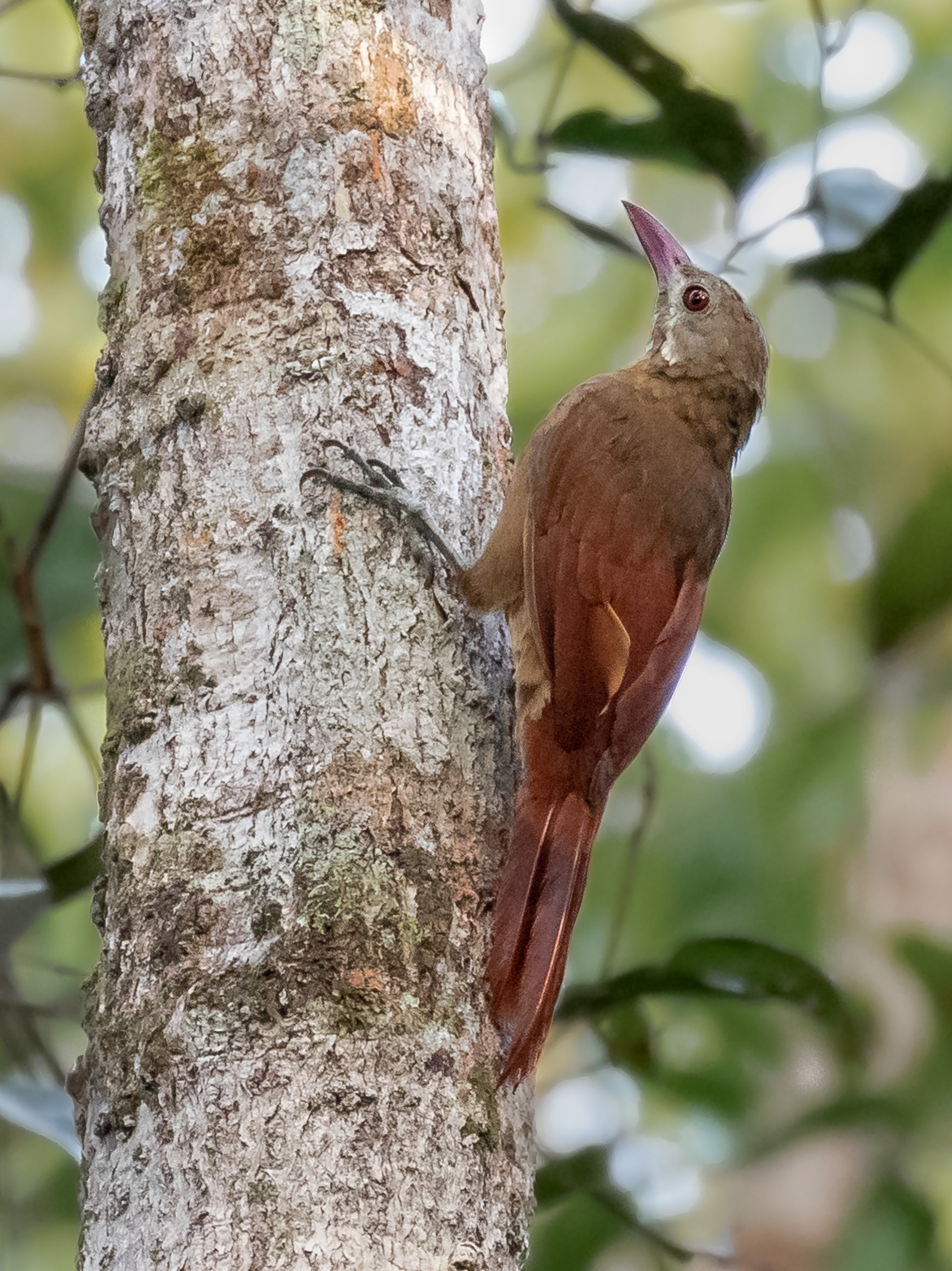

Scientific classification
- Kingdom: Animalia
- Phylum: Chordata
- Class: Aves
- Order: Passeriformes
- Family: Furnariidae
- Subfamily: Dendrocolaptinae
- Genus: Hylexetastes; P.L. Sclater, 1889

Type species
- Dendrocolaptes perrotii Lafresnaye, 1844

= Hylexetastes =

Genus of birds

Hylexetastes is a genus of birds in the Dendrocolaptinae subfamily.

== Species ==
The genus contains the following species:

Genus Hylexetastes – P.L. Sclater, 1889 – Three species
Common name	Scientific name and subspecies	Range	Size and ecology	IUCN status and estimated population
Bar-bellied woodcreeper	Hylexetastes stresemanni Snethlage, 1925	Western Amazon in northern Bolivia, far western Brazil, eastern Peru, southeastern Colombia, and, as recently confirmed, eastern Ecuador.	Size: Habitat: Diet:	LC
Red-billed woodcreeper	Hylexetastes perrotii (Lafresnaye, 1844)	Brazil, French Guiana, Guyana, Suriname, and Venezuela.	Size: Habitat: Diet:	LC
Uniform woodcreeper	Hylexetastes uniformis (Hellmayr, 1909) Two subspecies: H. u. uniformis (Hellmayr, 1909); H. u. brigidai (da Silva, Novaes, & Oren 1995)	south-central Amazon of Bolivia and Brazil.	Size: Habitat: Diet:	LC

However, a phylogenetic study found support for at least five evolutionary species in Hylexetastes: the four species above and H. undulatus (currently included in the Bar-bellied woodpecker).
