= Daphne Mabel Maugham =

British painter

Daphne Mabel Maugham later Daphne Maugham-Casorati (1897–1982) was a British painter, who emigrated to Turin, Italy.

== Family ==
Daphne was born in either London, England or perhaps at the British embassy in Paris, and registered in London. Her father Charles Maugham, born to a family of lawyers, was a barrister who had moved to Paris. Her family was a remarkable assembly. Her mother, Mabel, known as 'Beldy', Hardy made fabric genre scenes that were displayed at the Victoria and Albert Museum in London and Jeu de Paume in Paris. Mable was the daughter of Heywood Hardy, an English painter noted for his hunting scenes. Heywood's maternal grandfather was Sir William Beechey, a noted portrait artist, and father to no less than three painters. Daphne's sister Clarisse was also a painter. Her sister Cynthia was a dancer traveling with Alexander Sakharoff. Charles Maugham was also the brother of both the exiled British writer, W. Somerset Maugham and Frederic Maugham, who served as Lord Chancellor of the United Kingdom from 1938 to 1939.

== Life in England and France ==
Daphne Maugham initially studied painting in Paris, attending the Academie Rason, directed by Nabis artists Paul Sérusier and Maurice Denis. She then studied from 1918 to 1921 at the Accademie Notre-Dame des Champs with Cubist painter Andre Lhote. There she met the painter Mela Munter and Berthe Morisot. In 1914, she exhibited at the Galerie Druet of Paris, and in 1921, she was accepted at the Salon d’Automne. After this, she graduated in 1922 from the Slade School of Fine Art in London.

Daphne's sister had begun dancing in Italy, and traveled to Turin in 1925 where she was performing at the Teatro Gualino, patronized by the industrialist Ricardo Gualino. This led to encounter with Felice Casorati, with whom she began taking classes. They would marry by 1931 and have one son, Francesco. Among the other women in Casorati's orbit were Paola Levi-Montalcini, Giorgina Lattes and Nella Marchesini. In 1926, she exhibited at the Esposizione delle vedute of Turin organized by the Società di Belle Arti Antonio Fontanesi. In 1928, she exhibited at the Promotrice of Turin.

Over the next decade she would participate in numerous exhibitions, including at the Carnegie Institute of Pittsburgh, at the Quadriennali di Roma, and at the Biennale of Venice starting in 1928. With her husband, they fostered diverse intellectual salons in Turin, attended by Lionello Venturi, Giacomo Debenedetti, Carlo Levi, Mario Soldati, Giacomo Noventa, among others.
