= Fernando da Costa Novaes =

Brazilian ornithologist (1927–2004)

- Born: April 6, 1927; João Pessoa, Paraíba, Brazil
- Died: March 24, 2004 (aged 76); Belém, Pará, Brazil
- Education: Federal University of Rio de Janeiro
- Known for: "Founder of modern Brazilian ornithology"
- Awards: 1954 Guggenheim scholarship 1991 Ordem do Mérito do Grão-Pará, Comendador
- Scientific career
- Fields: Ornithology
- Workplaces: Museu Paraense Emílio Goeldi

Fernando da Costa Novaes (April 6, 1927 – March 24, 2004) was a Brazilian ornithologist who worked on the Amazonian bird fauna.

== Education ==
In 1971, he was granted his doctorate from the São Paulo State University at Rio Claro, with the thesis Estudo ecológico das aves em uma área de vegetação secundária do baixo rio Amazonas, Estado do Pará.

== Career ==
Novaes was based at the Museu Paraense Emílio Goeldi, in Belém, where he assembled the second largest bird skin and skeleton collection in Brazil. This collection has been renamed in his honor. His major contributions were in defining the Amazon region's faunal boundaries and affinities, as well as clarifying taxonomic problems.

In 1954, Novaes was granted a Simon Guggenheim Memorial Foundation fellowship to study in the US, at the Museum of Vertebrate Zoology, of the University of California at Berkeley, with the renowned ornithologist Alden H. Miller.

Novaes's many publications are listed in the obituaries by Oren and Silva.

He is commemorated in the name of the Alagoas foliage-gleaner, Philydor novaesi.

== Selected publications ==
- Acta Amazonica
  - 1976: "As aves do rio Aripuanã, Estado de Mato Grosso e Amazonas," 6(4): 61-85.
  - 1981: "Área de Vertebrados do Museu Paraense Emílio Goeldi," 11(1): 183-188.
- Anais da Academia Brasileira de Ciências
  - 1952: With J.M. Carvalho. "A new species of Megninia from the roseate spoonbill (Analgesidae, Analgesinae)," (1): 1-12.
  - 1961: "Sobre Thamnophilus palliatus (Licht.), com especial referência ao leste do Brasil. (Formicariidae, Aves)," 33(1): 111-117.
- Anais da Sociedade Sul-Riograndense de Ornitologia
  - 1980: "Observações sobre Procnias alba (Hermann), Araponga-branca," 1: 4-6.
  - 1981: "Sobre algumas aves do litoral do Estado do Pará," 2: 5-8.
  - 1982: "Observações sobre o comportamento de Thamnophilus amazonicus Sclater (Passeriformes, Formicariidae)," 3: 1-5.
- Ararajuba
  - 1991: With M.F.C. Lima. "Variação geográfica e anotações sobre morfologia e biologia de Selenidera gouldii (Piciformes: Ramphastidae)," 2: 59-63.
- Arquivos de Zoologia
  - 1960: "Sobre uma coleção de Aves do Sudeste do Estado do Pará," 11(6): 133-146.
- The Auk
  - 1959: "Quiscalus lugubris in Brasil," 76(2): 242.
- Biological Conservation
  - 1986: With D.C. Oren. "Observations on the Golden Parakeet Aratinga guarouba in Northern Brazil," 36: 329-337.
- Boletim do Museu Nacional Zoologia
  - 1952: "Algumas adendas à ornitologia de Goiás, Brasil," (117): 1-7.
- Boletim do Museu Paraense Emílio Goeldi
  - 1957: "Notas sobre a ecologia do bacurau Hydropsalis climaco¬cerca Tschudi (Caprimulgidae, Aves). Notas de ornitologia amazônica 1. Gêneros Formicarius e Phlegopsis," (8): 1-9.
  - 1957: With J.M. Carvalho. "Observações sobre a nidificação de Glaucis hirsuta (Gmelin) (Trochilidae, Aves)," (1): 1-12.
  - 1957: "Contribuição à ornitologia do noroeste do Acre," (9): 1-30.
  - 1958: "As aves e as comunidades bióticas no alto rio Juruá, Território do Acre," (14): 1-13.
  - 1959: "Variação geográfica e o problema da espécie nas aves do grupo Ramphocelus carbo," (22): 1-63.
  - 1963: "Uma nova subespécie de Turdus ignobilis Sclater no Estado do Pará e sobre a ocorrência de Turdus amaurochalinus Cabanis na região de Belém," (40): 1-4.
  - 1964: "Uma nova raça geográfica de Piprites chloris (Temminck) do Estado do Pará (Pipridae, Aves)," (47): 1-5.
  - 1965: "Notas sobre algumas aves da Serra Parima, Território de Roraima (Brasil)," (54): 1-10.
  - 1967: "Sobre algumas aves pouco conhecidas na Amazônia brasileira," (64): 1-8.
  - 1969: "Análise ecológica de uma avifauna da região do rio Acará, Estado do Pará," (69): 1-52.
  - 1970: "Distribuição ecológica e abundância das aves em um trecho da mata do baixo rio Guamá (Estado do Pará)," (71): 1-54.
  - 1978: "Sobre algumas aves pouco conhecidas da Amazônia brasileira II," (90): 1-15.
  - 1980: "Observações sobre a avifauna do alto curso do rio Paru de Leste, Estado do Pará," (100): 1-58.
  - 1981: "A estrutura da espécie nos periquitos do gênero Pionites Heine (Psittacidae, Aves)," (106): 1-21.
- Bulletin of the British Ornithologists' Club
  - 1985: With D.C. Oren. "A new subspecies of White Bellbird Procnias alba (Hermann) Southeastern Amazonia," 105(1): 23-25.
  - 1991: "A new subspecies of Grey-cheeked Nunlet Nonnula ruficapilla from Brazilian Amazonia," 111(4): 187-188.
- The Condor
  - 1959: "Procellaria aequinoctialis on Amazon River in Brazil," 61(4): 299.
  - 1984: With P. Roth and D.C. Oren. "The White Bellbird (Procnias alba) in the Serra dos Carajás, Southeastern Para, Brazil," 26: 343-344.
- Goeldiana zoologia
  - 1992: "Bird observations in the State of Piauí, Brazil," 17: 1-5.
- Papéis Avulsos de Zoologia
  - 1961: "Sobre as raças geográficas de Philydor rufus (Vieillot) no Brasil (Furnariidae, Aves)," 14(24): 227-235.
- Publicações Avulsas do Museu Paraense Emílio Goeldi
  - 1973: With T. Pimentel. "Observações sobre a avifauna dos Campos de Bragança, Estado do Pará," 20: 229-246.
  - 1973: "Aves de uma vegetação secundária na foz do Amazonas," 21: 1-88.
  - 1974: "Ornitologia do Território do Amapá I," 25: 1-121.
  - 1978: "Ornitologia do Território do Amapá II," 29: 1-75.
- Revista Brasileira de Biologia
  - 1949: "Variação nos tucanos brasileiros do gênero Ramphastos L. (Ramphastidae, Piciformes)," 9(3): 285-296.
  - 1950: "Sobre as aves de Sernambetiba," 10(2): 199-208.
  - 1952: "Resultados ornitológicos da "Expedição João Alberto" à ilha da Trindade," 12(2): 219-228.
  - 1952: With J.M. Carvalho. "A new genus and species of feather mite (Pterolichinae, Analgesidae)," 24(3): 303-306.
  - 1953: "Sobre a validade de Syndactyla mirandae (Snethlage, 1928) (Furnariidae, Aves)," 14(1): 75-76.
  - 1953: "A new species of Neumanniella from the tataupa tinamou (Sarcoptiformes, Analgesidae)," 13(2): 203-204.
  - 1953: "A new race of tody-tyrant from southeastern Brasil (Tyrannidae, Aves)," 13(3): 235-236.
  - 1960: "Sobre Ramphotrigon megacephala (Swainson) (Tyrannidae, Aves)," 20(2): 217-221.
  - 1960: "As raças geográficas de Thamnophilus doliatus (Linnaeus) no Brasil. (Formicariidae, Aves)," 20(4): 415-424.
  - 1961: "Distribuição e diferenciação geográfica de Automolus leucopthalmus (Wied.) e Automolus infuscatus (Sclater) (Furnariidae, Aves)," 21(2): 179-192.
  - 1968: "Variação geográfica em Platyrinchus saturatus Salvin & Godman (Aves, Tyrannidae)," 28(2): 115-119.
- Revista Brasileira de Zoologia
  - 1991: With M.F.C. Lima. "As aves do rio Peixoto de Azevedo, Mato Grosso, Brasil," 7(3): 351-381.
- Revista Científica
  - 1950: "Sobre alguns termos da sistemática zoológica," 1(4): 10-14.
- Summa Brasiliensis Biologiae
  - 1947: "Notas sobre os Conopophagidae do Museu Nacional (Passeriformes, Aves)," 1(13): 243-250.
