= Eugenia Sacerdote de Lustig =

Argentine physician

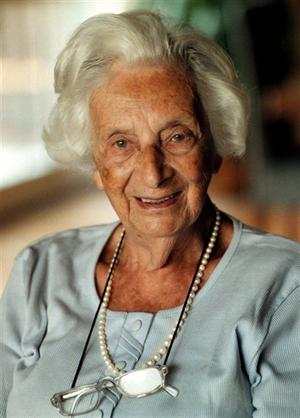
- Born: Eugenia Sacerdote; 9 November 1910; Turin, Kingdom of Italy
- Died: 27 November 2011 (aged 101); Buenos Aires, Argentina
- Education: University of Turin
- Occupation: Physician
- Known for: First to test the polio vaccine in Argentina
- Relatives: Rita Levi-Montalcini (cousin); Paola Levi-Montalcini (cousin); Gino Levi-Montalcini (cousin)
- Awards: Rebeca Gerschman Award (2010)

Eugenia Sacerdote de Lustig (née Sacerdote; 9 November 1910 – 27 November 2011) was an Italian-born Argentine physician. She was the first to test the polio vaccine in Argentina. She published more than 180 works.

== Early life and education ==
Eugenia Sacerdote de Lustig was born in Turin on 9 November 1910 to a well-to-do Italian-Jewish family.

In 1929, Sacerdote de Lustig decided to study medicine in Italy, at the University of Turin, at a time when women were not choosing this career. Together with her first cousin, future Nobel Prize laureate Rita Levi-Montalcini, she was one of the first four women who stood out for their gender as they were taught with 500 men.

== Career ==
Despite difficulties in her career, Sacerdote de Lustig was selected as assistant professor of histology at University of Turin by professor Giuseppe Levi. With the rise of fascism, she lost her job because Jews were banned from public office since the implementation of the Italian racial laws. Her husband's employers arranged for them to emigrate, with their daughter, to Argentina in 1939. There, her qualifications initially allowed her to research but not to teach, although she later became the chair of histology at the University of Buenos Aires. She cultivated living cells in vitro, a technique that allows the study of different types of viruses and tumors.

When the epidemic of poliomyelitis occurred, Sacerdote de Lustig was sent by the World Health Organization to the United States to learn about the work of the professor Jonas Salk. When she returned to Argentina, she inoculated herself in public and did the same with her children to convince the population of the benefits of the polio vaccine.

From 1989, she investigated the role of free radicals and oxidative stress in living patients with Alzheimer's disease, vascular dementia and Parkinson's disease, expanding the basic knowledge of neurological diseases.

Sacerdote de Lustig was a researcher at CONICET and head of virology at Instituto Malbrán. For more than 40 years, she studied tumor cells in the Institute of Oncology Ángel H. Roffo. She continued to work in the laboratory into her eighties, ceasing to do so when blindness prevented her from accurately working with a microscope. There are more than 180 of her scientific publications in the records of the three institutes.

She received the 2010 Rebeca Gerschman Award for outstanding research work.
