= Paola Levi-Montalcini =

Italian painter (1909–2000)

- Born: Paola Levi; 22 April 1909; Turin, Kingdom of Italy
- Died: 29 September 2000 (aged 91); Rome, Italy
- Occupations: Painter; sculptor
- Parents: Adamo Levi (father); Adele Montalcini (mother)
- Relatives: Rita Levi-Montalcini (twin sister); Gino Levi-Montalcini (brother); Eugenia Sacerdote de Lustig (cousin)

Paola Levi-Montalcini (born Paola Levi; 22 April 1909 – 29 September 2000) was an Italian painter and sculptor.

== Early and personal life ==
Paola Levi-Montalcini was born in Turin to Sephardi Jewish parents Adamo Levi and Adele Montalcini. She was one of four children. Her fraternal twin sister was the neurologist Rita Levi-Montalcini, who won the Nobel Prize in Medicine in 1986. Her older brother, Gino Levi-Montalcini, was an engineer and architect. She also had an older sister, Anna Maria, also known as Nina.

== Career ==
Levi-Montalcini studied art in Turin with Felice Casorati. She made her debut at the first edition of the Rome Quadriennale in 1931, where she exhibited a portrait of her sister Anna Maria. In 1936, she was invited to the Venice Biennale, and in 1937, she was one of the artists included in the exhibition Les femmes artistes d'Europe at the Galerie nationale du Jeu de Paume in Paris. Giorgio de Chirico, who was a big fan of her work, agreed to write the essay for her first monograph on her in 1939, noting "her preferences for solid construction, large surfaces [...] and tendency to draw attention to the fantastic aspect of reality".

Thanks to the support of fellow artist and friend Marisa Mori, Levi-Montalcini was able to continue living in Florence during the establishment of the Italian racial laws from 1938 to 1943. Following the end of the war, she resumed her exhibiting career with a solo show at Galleria Il Fiore in Florence, and she studied engraving with Stanley William Hayter. Hayter also trained her in automatic writing and gestural abstraction.

Interested in post-Cubism, Levi-Montalcini later abandoned figuration for Concretism, and by 1950, she joined the Movimento Arte Concreta. Between 1953 and 1954, she created one of her most well-known bodies of work, The Letters and the Pots. Towards the end of the 1960s, she started creating kinetic and light sculptures.

== Awards ==
- 1950: XXV Venice Biennale Prize
- 1956: Il Fiorino Prize for Graphics, Florence
- 1957: Morgan's Paint Prize, Rimini
- 1961: Arezzo Prize, Arezzo

== Bibliography ==
- Giorgio de Chirico, Paola Levi Montalcini, Turin, 1939
- Gillo Dorfles, Paola Levi Montalcini, Turin, 1962
- Giulio Carlo Argan, Nello Ponente, Italo Mussa, Paola Levi Montalcini, Rome, 1981
- Simonetta Lux (ed.), Paola Levi Montalcini: Metamorfosi, Rome, 2001
