= Papéis Avulsos de Zoologia =

- Discipline: Zoology
- Language: English, Portuguese, Spanish
- Edited by: Carlos José Einicker Lamas

Publication details
- History: 1941–present
- Publisher: Museum of Zoology of the University of São Paulo (Brazil)
- Open access: Yes
- License: CC BY-NC

Standard abbreviations
- ISO 4: Pap. Avulsos Zool.

Indexing
- ISSN: 0031-1049
- OCLC no.: 53958918

Links
- Journal homepage; Online archive

Papéis Avulsos de Zoologia is a peer-reviewed scientific journal covering research in systematics, paleontology, evolutionary biology, ecology, taxonomy, anatomy, behavior, functional morphology, molecular biology, ontogeny, faunistic studies, and biogeography. It is published by the Museum of Zoology of the University of São Paulo and hosted by SciELO.

== Abstracting and indexing ==
The journal is abstracted and indexed by Biological Abstracts, BIOSIS, DOAJ, Portal de Revistas da USP, SciELO, Scopus, Ulrich's Periodicals Directory and The Zoological Record.
