= Revista Brasileira de Biologia =

- Discipline: Biology
- Language: Portuguese and multlingual
- Edited by: Herman Lent

Publication details
- History: v. 1–abril 1941. Ceased with: Vol 61, number 2, 2001. Continued by Brazilian Journal of Biology
- Publisher: Academia Brasileira de Ciências; Sociedade de Biologia do Brasil; Instituto Internacional de Ecologia (Brazil)
- Frequency: Quarterly

Standard abbreviations
- ISO 4: Rev. Bras. Biol.

Indexing
- CODEN: RBBIAL
- ISSN: 0034-7108 (print); 1806-9606 (web)
- LCCN: s41000057

Links
- Journal homepage

The Revista Brasileira de Biologia was an academic journal about biology, published by the Sociedade Brasileira de Biologia. The creation of this Brazilian scientific journal was funded by the philanthropist Guilherme Guinle, and the first issue was published in April 1941. Only in 1971 did the journal begin to be published by the Academia Brasileira de Ciências. In 2000, its publication was resumed under the name Brazilian Journal of Biology.
