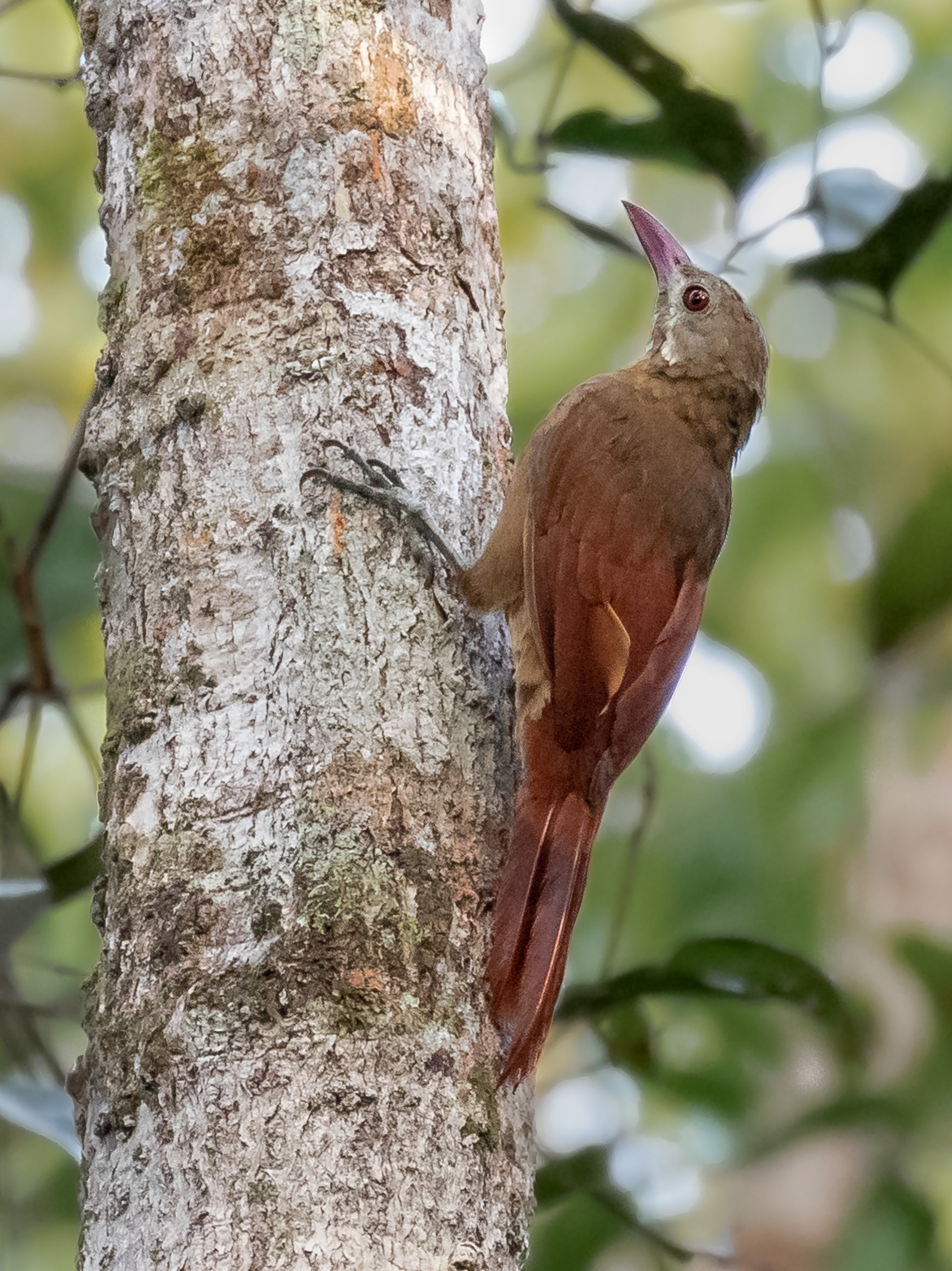

Scientific classification
- Kingdom: Animalia
- Phylum: Chordata
- Class: Aves
- Order: Passeriformes
- Family: Furnariidae
- Genus: Hylexetastes
- Species: H. perrotii

Binomial name
- Hylexetastes perrotii (Lafresnaye, 1844)

= Red-billed woodcreeper =

Species of bird

The red-billed woodcreeper (Hylexetastes perrotii) is a species of bird in the subfamily Dendrocolaptinae of the ovenbird family Furnariidae. It is found in Brazil, French Guiana, Guyana, Suriname, and Venezuela.

== Taxonomy and systematics ==
The red-billed woodcreeper's taxonomy is unsettled. Some authors have suggested that it and the bar-bellied woodcreeper (H. stresemanni) are conspecific. The International Ornithological Committee (IOC) and the Clements taxonomy treat it as monotypic. BirdLife International's Handbook of the Birds of the World (HBW) assigns it two subspecies in addition to the nominate subspecies. The IOC and Clements treat those two taxa as subspecies of the uniform woodcreeper (H. uniformis).

This article follows the monotypic species model.

== Description ==
The red-billed woodcreeper is one of the largest members of its subfamily. It is heavy-bodied, with a shortish tail and a short and massive bill. It is 25 to 30 cm (9.8 to 12 in) long. Males weigh 112 to 137.5 g (4.0 to 4.9 oz) and females 110 to 145 g (3.9 to 5.1 oz). The sexes have the same plumage. Adults have smoky brown to olive-brown head, back, and wing coverts. Their rump, wings, and tail are bright rufous to rufous-chestnut, with dusky tips on the primaries. They have whitish lores and a white "moustache" that extends under the eye. Their throat is olive-brown with a paler center, their breast grayish brown, their belly buffy brown, and their undertail coverts brown with a rufescent cast. Their iris is brown, reddish brown, or red. Their bill is wine-red to brownish and their legs and feet green or olive with some brown and gray. Juveniles have weak streaks on their crown, are more heavily barred and rufescent below than adults, and have dark gray eyes and a dusky to blackish bill.

== Distribution and habitat ==
The red-billed woodcreeper is found in the northeastern Amazon Basin from eastern Venezuela east through the Guianas and northern Brazil north of the Amazon River between the Rio Negro and Amapá state. It mostly inhabits humid terra firme forest. It also occurs in gallery forest, várzea, and forest on sandy soil, and in Suriname rarely in savanna. It favors the interior of primary forest but occasionally occurs at its edges and in mature secondary forest. It is found only at low elevations.

== Behavior ==
=== Movement ===
The red-billed woodcreeper is a year-round resident throughout its range.

=== Feeding ===
The red-billed woodcreeper's diet is mostly a wide variety of arthropods and also includes small vertebrates such as frogs and snakes. It typically forages singly or in pairs. It often follows army ant swarms and joins mixed-species feeding flocks. It forages by sallies from a vertical perch, fairly low when attending ant swarms and up to the subcanopy elsewhere. It has also been observed digging for prey in rotten wood and termite nests.

=== Breeding ===
Little is known about the red-billed woodcreeper's breeding biology. In Brazil it apparently nests between June and September and somewhat later in the Guianas. The few observed nests were in cavities near the top of stumps. The clutch size is not known but is speculated to be a single egg.

=== Vocalization ===
The red-billed woodcreeper sings mostly at dawn and dusk and occasionally during the day. Its song is "a loud, ringing series of 2–6 whistles...almost disyllabic, first part longer and sometimes lower in pitch, second higher and more emphasized". The song has been put into words as "kyuu-hee, kyuu-hee…" and "hoooooreet, hoooooreet, hoooreet, hooreet". Its variety of calls include "screee-wip", "nnyeah", "nyip, nyeek, nyeek, weeweweweip", and a "growling series of cag notes, [and] faint grunting whinh, whaih, whaih".

== Status ==
The IUCN follows HBW taxonomy and so has not assessed the red-billed woodcreeper sensu stricto as a separate species. It has assessed the red-billed plus uniform woodcreepers as being of Least Concern. The red-billed woodcreeper is poorly known and "probably uncommon to rare throughout its range, and apparently present at most sites in low densities and on large, mutually exclusive territories." It appears to be very sensitive to habitat modification.
