= Gino Levi-Montalcini =

Italian architect and designer (1902–1974)

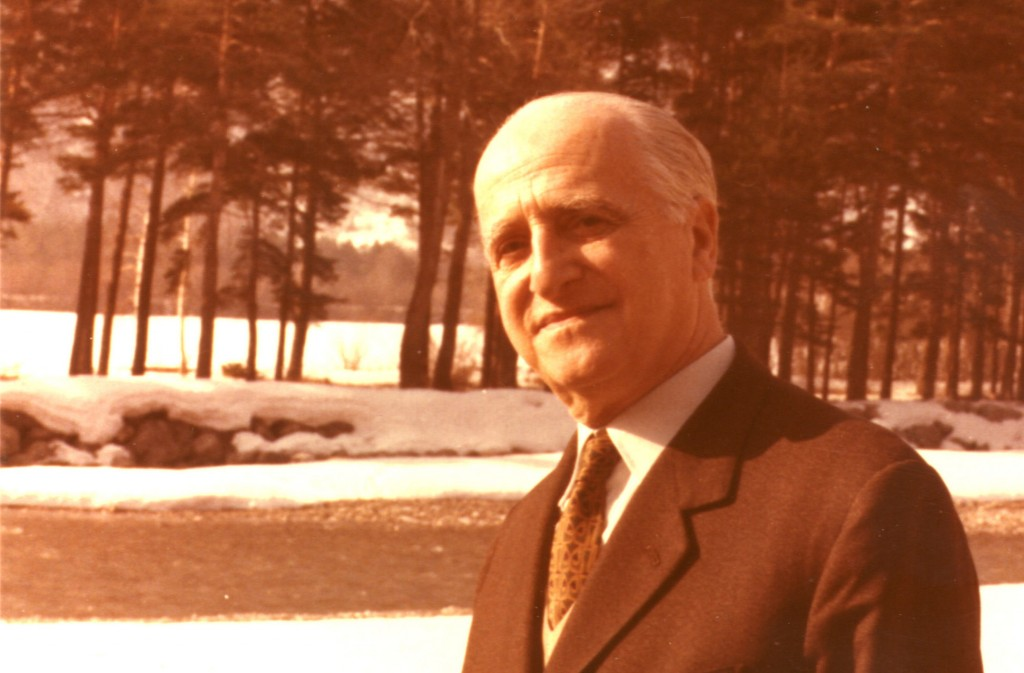
- Levi-Montalcini in the 1960s
- Born: Luigi Levi; 21 April 1902; Milan, Kingdom of Italy
- Died: 29 November 1974 (aged 72); Turin, Italy
- Education: Polytechnic University of Turin
- Spouse: Maria Gattone (m. 1943)
- Children: 2
- Relatives: Rita Levi-Montalcini (sister); Paola Levi-Montalcini (sister); Eugenia Sacerdote de Lustig (cousin)

Luigi "Gino" Levi-Montalcini (born Luigi Levi; 21 April 1902 – 29 November 1974) was an Italian architect and designer.

== Biography ==
Luigi Levi was born in Milan to Adamo Levi, an engineer from Turin, and Adele Montalcini, a painter. Like his sisters Anna (1905–2000), Rita (1909–2012), a scientist, and Paola (1909–2000), a painter, he took the surname Levi-Montalcini. In Turin, he studied at the Liceo Classico Massimo D'Azeglio, and took private courses in drawing and sculpture. He graduated in 1925 from the Royal School of Engineering in Turin (now the Polytechnic University of Turin).

In the 1920s and 30s in Turin, he associated with a wide circle of intellectuals and artists which included architects, painters and art critics, including Giuseppe Pagano, Edoardo Persico, Felice Casorati, Gigi Chessa, Henry Paolucci, Umberto Cuzzi, Domenico Morelli, Mario Passanti, and Carlo Mollino.

His collaboration with Giuseppe Pagano, a classmate who was six years older, marks the beginning of his career as an architect, with projects that place him among the first and most important representatives of the rationalist movement in Italy. The Palazzo Gualino office building they designed for the financier Riccardo Gualino drew an immediate response at the international level. Other projects designed by the two architects were publicized and analyzed by critics, in particular through the pages of Casabella and Domus.

He moved to Milan after the separation from Pagano. Among the most important works of this period is the Colonia elioterapica di Bardonecchia (1936–38). He and his family were affected by the anti-Jewish laws in 1938. After Jews were banned from university posts and the practice of medicine, he helped his sister assemble a secret laboratory in her bedroom at their parents' house in Turin so she could continue her medical research.

In 1943, he married Maria Gattone. In 1944, they had a son, Emanuele, and in 1946, a daughter, Piera. From 1943 to 1945, he was displaced to Florence, where he was able to escape anti-Jewish persecution under a false name.

After the end of the Second World War, he returned to Turin and, in 1946, joined the Giuseppe Pagano Group and the local branch of APAO, engaging with issues of postwar reconstruction and new tasks of architecture.

In the 1950s, he worked on numerous projects. He focused on higher education and increasing participation in competitions for major works, including (in collaboration with colleagues Domenico Morelli, Felice Bardelli and Sergio Hutter) the project for a new building for the University of Turin.

He also designed furniture and decor, starting with 67 pieces of furniture for the Palazzo Gualino and including furnishings of important public buildings, such as the Hall of the Press in Turin, in shops, including the Borletti in Galleria San Federico, and for exhibitions.

He remained a sculptor, for which he had an early vocation, and made drawings, portraits and caricatures. His sculptures and portraits in pen and oil are reminiscent of those of Pagano, Mollino, and other architects from Turin.

His academic career began at the Polytechnic of Turin, where he was a lecturer in architectural composition from 1948 to 1956. He served as a professor at the Faculty of Architecture of the University of Palermo from 1956 to 1964, at the Faculty of Engineering at the University of Padua from 1964 to 1971, and at Turin in 1971–72.

He was President of the Council of the Order of Architects of the Province of Turin in 1969–70, and in 1969 was appointed a member of the National Academy of St. Luke.

Gino Levi-Montalcini died in Turin on 29 November 1974. He was 72.

== Works ==
Front of palazzo nuovo, University of Turin, which Gino Levi-Montalcini helped design.

- International Exhibition of Turin: Hall of the Army, Navy, Air Force (with G. Pagano and E. Pittini); Pavilion Celebration and Fashion (with G. Pagano);
- Office building group Gualino (Palazzo Gualino) in Corso Vittorio Emanuele 8, Turin (with G. Pagano). (1928–29)
- Villa Hills, Rivara Canavese (with G. Pagano). (1928–29)
- Casa Boasso, via Groscavallo 8, Torino (with G. Pagano). (1928–29)
- International Exhibition of Liege, Belgium (with G. Pagano): Hall of Italy. (1929-1930)
- Offices SALPA, Sesto San Giovanni (with G. Pagano). (1930)
- Draft modern villa on the hill of Turin (with G. Pagano). (1930)
- Project for the planning of the new Via Roma, Torino (with O. Aloisio, U. Cuzzi, G. Pagano and E. Sottsass). (1931)
- Exhibition of Fashion and Furniture, Italy: stand "Screenplay by Beach-Mountain '. (1932)
- Milan Triennial V: "summer room" (with O. Aloisio, G. Chessa, U. Cuzzi, E. Paolucci, E. Sott-Sass and C. Turina) (1933)
- Competition Project for the second leg of the Nuova Via Roma, Turin. (1933)
- Shop Borletti, Galleria San Federico, Turin. (1933)
- Competition Project for the Palazzo del Littorio in Via dell'Impero, Rome (with U. Cuzzi and E. Pifferi). (1934)
- Villa Caudano Avenue XXV Aprile, Turin. (1935-1936)
- Milan Triennial VI: preparation of the retrospective exhibition of the artist Gigi Chessa. (1936)
- Villa Lanfranco-Gromo in Corso Giovanni Lanza, Turin. (1936-1937)
- Colonia Montana IX May, Bardonecchia. (1936-1938)
- Torre-bollitore for Cartiere G. Bosso, Lanzo Torinese (with P. Ceresa). (1942-1943)
- Villa Ballarini, Sauze d'Oulx. (1947)
- Villa Morocco, Sauze d'Oulx (with P. Ceresa). (1947)
- Furniture of Living "La Stampa" in Via Roma, Torino. (1947-1948)
- Hydroelectric "Grand Pra," Ceres (with P. Ceresa). (1947-1948)
- House in Corso Duca degli Abruzzi, Italy (with G. Casalegno and P. Ceresa). (1947-1948)
- Project for the New Airport of Genoa-Arenzano (with P. Ceresa and Schiappacasse EL). (1947-1951)
- Draft Case UNRRA-Casas for refugees Julian of Turin (with P. Ceresa). (1950)
- Power plant Sip, Chivasso (with P. Ceresa and M. loops). (1950-1952)
- Districts Ina-Casa Genoa, Favria, Savona, Albenga, Campo Ligure, Arenzano, Masone, Pinerolo. (In collaboration). (1951-1952)
- House-building in Corso Re Umberto, Turin. (1955)
- Building of homes under Montevecchio, Turin (with P. Ceresa and L. Buffa)
- Building of a home in Corso Giulio Cesare, Turin. (1956)
- Coordination of the urban district of "Le Vallette," Turin. (1957-1958)
- Five buildings in the neighbourhood "Le Vallette," Turin (G. Levi Montalcini parent company, D. Morelli, M. and F. Vaudetti loops). (1957-1965)
- Competition Project for the seat of the Faculty of Law, Humanities, Teaching, Business Administration, University of Turin (first prize ex aequo). (1958)
- Villa Levi-Montalcini, Forte dei Marmi. (1959–65)
- New building of the Faculty of Humanities of the University ofTurin (DS Morelli, F. Bardelli and S. Hutter). (1959–68)
- Villa Scucchia Chelotti, Villarbasse, Turin. (1968)
- Two condos for homes and offices, "Palaces of the Lodges," waterfront Perotti, Bari (with E. Levi Montalcini). (1972)
