= Rita Levi-Montalcini =

Italian neurologist (1909–2012)

Senator for Life Rita Levi-Montalcini OMRI OMCA
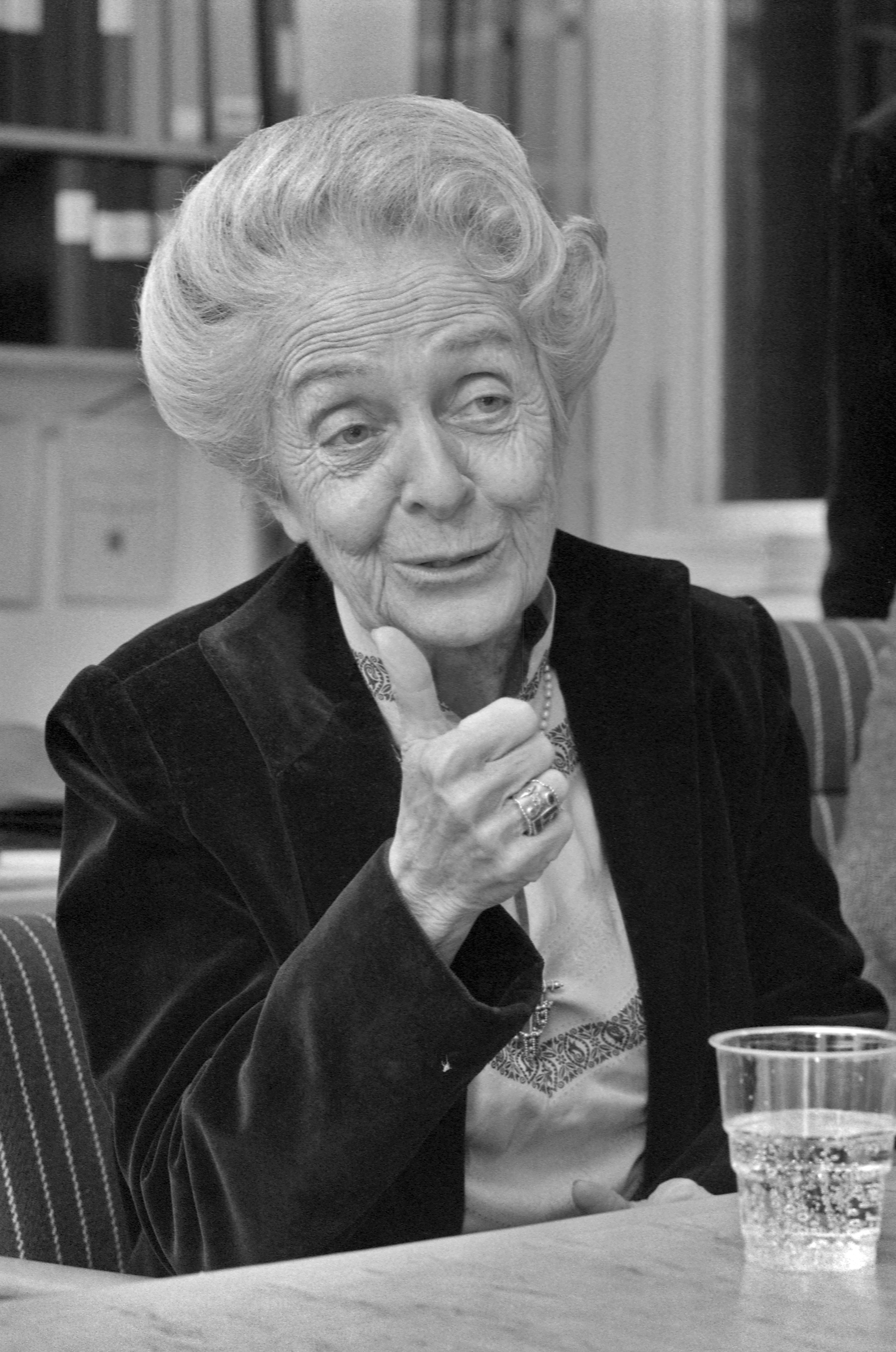
- Levi-Montalcini during a visit to Lund, Sweden, 1986
- Born: Rita Levi; 22 April 1909; Turin, Kingdom of Italy
- Died: 30 December 2012 (aged 103); Rome, Italy
- Citizenship: Italy; United States
- Education: University of Turin
- Known for: Nerve growth factor
- Relatives: Paola Levi-Montalcini (twin sister); Gino Levi-Montalcini (brother); Eugenia Sacerdote de Lustig (cousin)
- Awards: Louisa Gross Horwitz Prize (1983); Lasker Award (1986); Nobel Prize (1986); National Medal of Science (1987); Honorary degree in Biotechnology at Bocconi University (2008); Others (see below)
- Scientific career
- Fields: Neurobiology
- Workplaces: Washington University in St. Louis
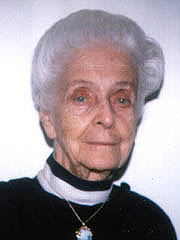
- Official portrait, 2001

Member of the Senate of the Republic
- Life tenure 1 August 2001 – 30 December 2012
- Appointed by: Carlo Azeglio Ciampi
- Parliamentary group: Independent

Rita Levi-Montalcini (Note: American English: /ˌleɪvi ˌmoʊntɑːlˈtʃiːni, ˌlɛv-, ˌliːvi ˌmɒntəlˈ-/ LAY-vee MOHN-tahl-CHEE-nee, LEV-ee -, LEE-vee MON-təl-, Italian: [ˈriːta ˈlɛːvi montalˈtʃiːni].) (born Rita Levi; 22 April 1909 – 30 December 2012) was an Italian neurobiologist. She was awarded the 1986 Nobel Prize in Physiology or Medicine jointly with colleague Stanley Cohen for the discovery of nerve growth factor (NGF).

From 2001 until her death, she also served in the Italian Senate as a senator for life, an honor she was bestowed upon in light of her significant scientific contributions. On 22 April 2009, she became the first Nobel laureate to reach the age of 100, and the event was feted with a party at Rome's City Hall.

== Early life and education ==
Levi-Montalcini was born on 22 April 1909 in Turin, to Italian Jewish parents with roots dating back to the Roman Empire. She and her twin sister Paola (who would become a respected artist best known for her reflective aluminum sculptures) were the youngest of four children. Her parents were Adele Montalcini, a painter, and Adamo Levi, an electrical engineer and mathematician, whose families had moved from Asti and Casale Monferrato, respectively, to Turin at the turn of the twentieth century.

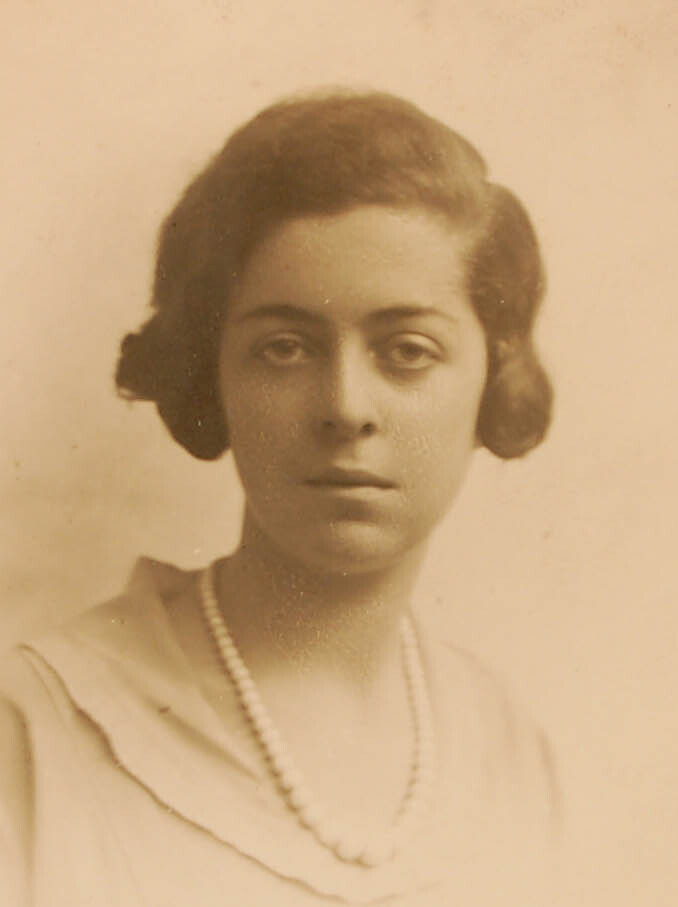
Levi-Montalcini in 1930

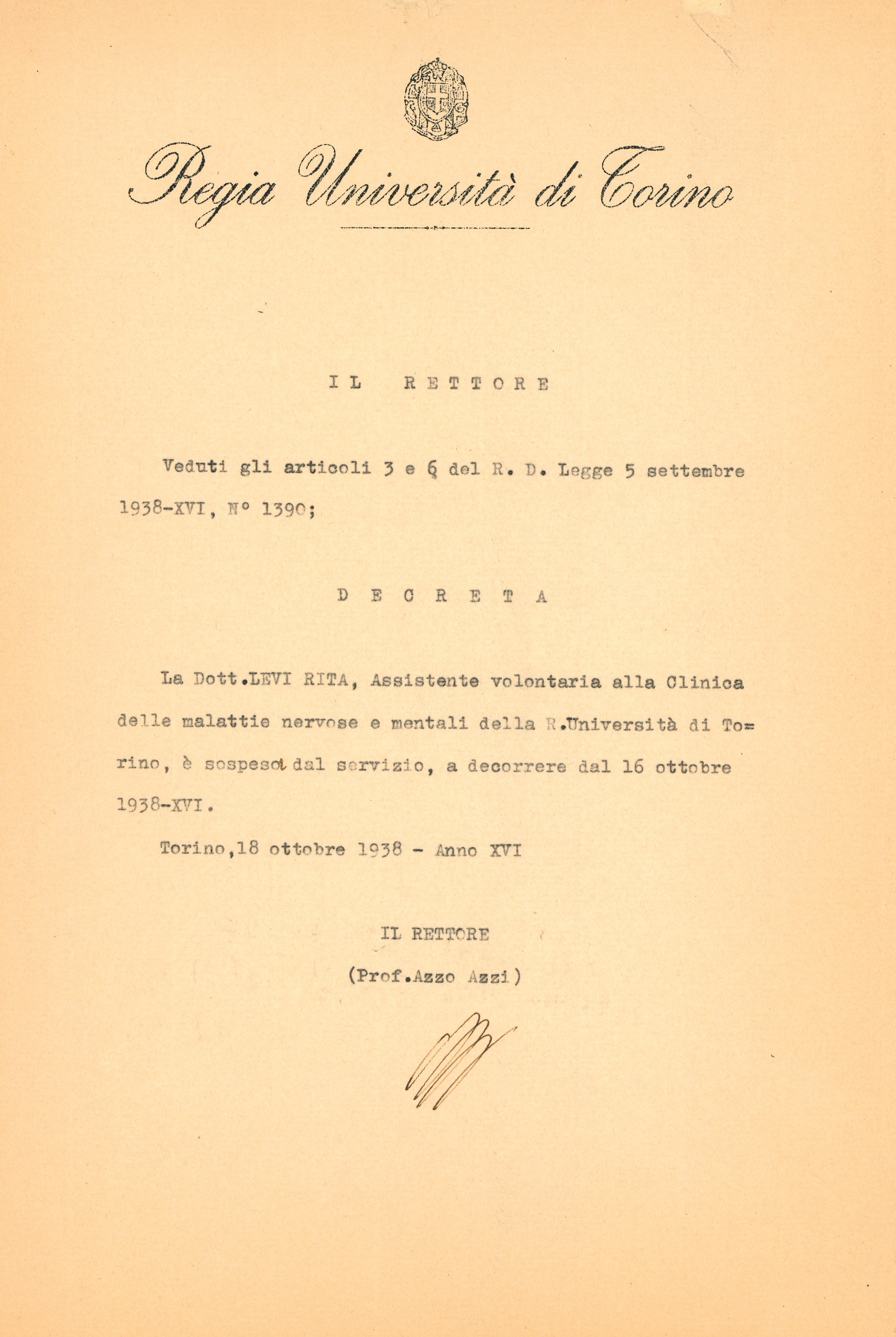
Notice of Expulsion of Levi-Montalcini from the University of Turin

In her teenage years, she considered becoming a writer and admired Swedish writer Selma Lagerlöf, but after seeing a close family friend die of stomach cancer she decided to attend the University of Turin Medical School. Her father discouraged his daughters from attending college, as he feared it would disrupt their potential lives as wives and mothers, but eventually he supported Levi-Montalcini's aspirations to become a doctor. While she was at the University of Turin, the neurohistologist Giuseppe Levi sparked her interest in the developing nervous system. After graduating summa cum laude M.D. in 1936, Levi-Montalcini remained at the university as Levi's assistant, but her academic career was cut short by Benito Mussolini's 1938 Manifesto of Race and the subsequent introduction of laws barring Jews from academic and professional careers.

== Career and research ==
During World War II, Levi-Montalcini set up a laboratory in her bedroom in Turin and studied the growth of nerve fibers in chicken embryos, discovering that nerve cells die when they lack targets, and laying the groundwork for much of her later research. She described this experience decades later in the science documentary film Death by Design: The Life and Times of Life and Times (1997).

When Germany invaded Italy in September 1943, her family fled south to Florence, where they survived The Holocaust, under false identities, protected by some non-Jewish friends. During the Nazi occupation, Levi-Montalcini was in contact with the partisans of the Action Party. After the liberation of Florence in August 1944, she volunteered her medical expertise for the Allied health service, providing critical care to those injured during the war. This period highlighted her resilience and commitment to medical science despite the tumultuous circumstances. Upon returning to Turin in 1945, she resumed her research activities.

In September 1946, Levi-Montalcini was granted a one-semester research fellowship in the laboratory of Professor Viktor Hamburger at Washington University School of Medicine; he was interested in two of the articles Levi-Montalcini had published in foreign scientific journals. After she duplicated the results of her home laboratory experiments, Hamburger offered her a research associate position, which she held for 30 years. It was there that, in 1952, she did her most important work: isolating nerve growth factor (NGF) from observations of certain cancerous tissues that cause extremely rapid growth of nerve cells. This crucial finding in biology identified NGF as the main protein responsible for the growth of neurons within the nervous system, allowing for major advances in research. The critical experiment was done with Hertha Meyer at the Carlos Chagas Filho Biophysics Institute of the Federal University of Rio de Janeiro in 1952. Their publication in 1954 became the first definitive indication of the protein.

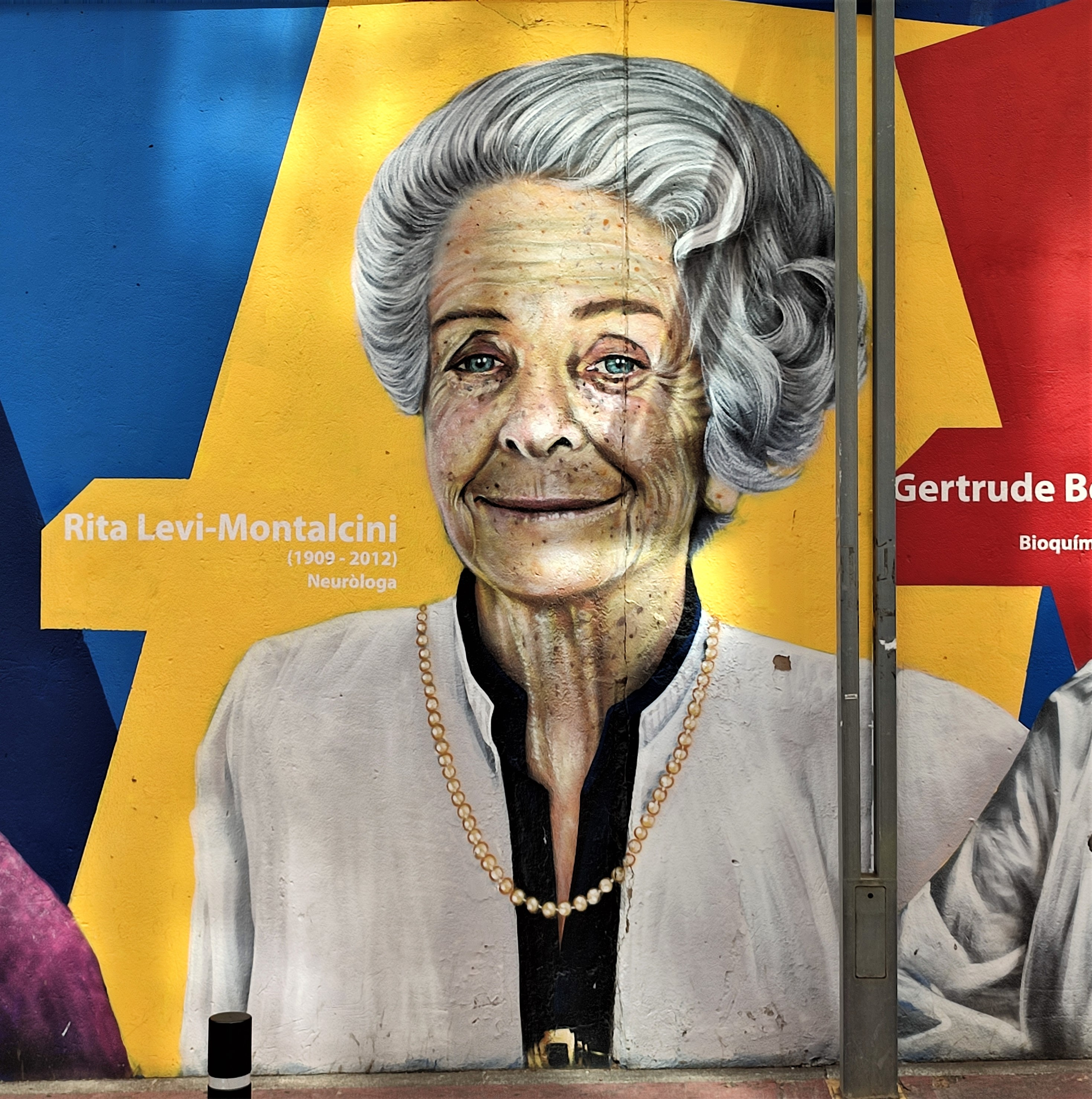
A portrait of Levi-Montalcini on the external wall of the Vall d'Hebron University Hospital in Barcelona, Spain

By transferring pieces of tumours to chick embryos, Levi-Montalcini established a mass of cells that was full of nerve fibres. The discovery of nerves growing everywhere like a halo around the tumour cells was surprising. When describing it, Levi-Montalcini said it is: "like rivulets of water flowing steadily over a bed of stones." The nerve growth produced by the tumour was unlike anything she had seen before – the nerves took over areas that would become other tissues and even entered veins in the embryo. But nerves did not grow into the arteries, which would flow from the embryo back to the tumour. This suggested to Levi-Montalcini that the tumour itself was releasing a substance that was stimulating the growth of nerves. Her research led to the seminal publication "In vitro experiments on the effects of mouse sarcomas 180 and 37 on the spinal and sympathetic ganglia of the chick embryo" in 1954, which was a foundational work in identifying and understanding nerve growth factor (NGF). NGF is a critical protein for the growth and maintenance of neurons in the sympathetic and sensory nervous systems, without which brain cells die. This discovery paved the way for future research in neurobiology, demonstrating that the nervous, immune and endocrine systems are linked which had profound implications for understanding neurodegenerative diseases.

She was made a full professor in 1958. In 1962, she established a second laboratory in Rome and divided her time between there and St. Louis. In 1963, she became the first woman to receive the Max Weinstein Award (given by the United Cerebral Palsy Association) due to her significant contributions to neurological research.

From 1961 to 1969, she directed the Research Center of Neurobiology of the National Research Council, and from 1969 to 1978, the Laboratory of Cellular Biology. After she retired in 1977, she was appointed as director of the Institute of Cell Biology of the Italian National Council of Research in Rome. She later retired from that position in 1979, but continued to be involved as a guest professor.

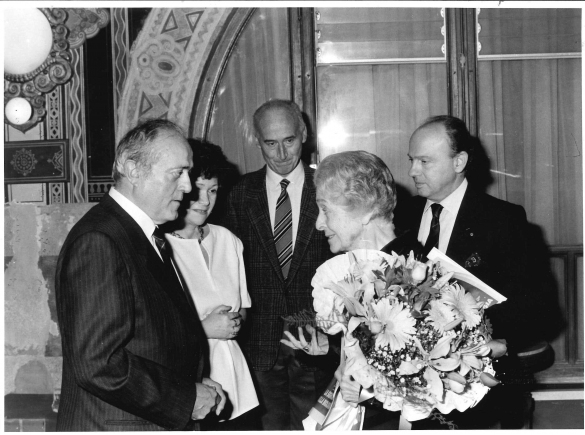
Levi-Montalcini at a public event in Salsomaggiore Terme, 1981

Levi-Montalcini founded the European Brain Research Institute in 2002, and then served as its president. Her role in this institute was at the centre of some criticism from some parts of the scientific community in 2010.

Controversies were raised concerning the cooperation of Levi-Montalcini with the Italian pharmaceutical firm Fidia. While working for Fidia, she improved her understanding of gangliosides. Beginning in 1975, she supported the drug Cronassial (a particular mixture of gangliosides) produced by Fidia from bovine brain tissue. Independent studies showed that the drug actually could be successful in the treatment of intended diseases (peripheral neuropathies). Years later, some patients under treatment with Cronassial reported a severe neurological syndrome (Guillain–Barré syndrome). As per the normal cautionary routine, Germany banned Cronassial in 1983, followed by other countries. Italy prohibited the drug only in 1993; at the same time, an investigation revealed that Fidia paid the Italian Ministry of Health for a quick approval of Cronassial and later paid for pushing the use of the drug in the treatment of diseases where it had not been tested. Levi-Montalcini's relationship with the company was revealed during the investigation, and she was criticized publicly.

In the 1990s, she was one of the first scientists to point out the importance of the mast cell in human pathology. In the same period (1993), she identified the endogenous compound palmitoylethanolamide as an important modulator of this cell. Understanding this mechanism initiated a new era of research into this compound which has resulted in more discoveries regarding its mechanisms and benefits, a far better understanding of the endocannabinoid system and new liposomal palmitoylethanolamide product formulations designed specifically for improved absorption and bioavailability.

Levi-Montalcini earned a Nobel Prize along with Stanley Cohen in 1986 in the physiology or medicine category. The two earned their Nobel Prizes for their research into the nerve growth factor (NGF), the protein that causes cell growth due to stimulated nerve tissue.

== Political career ==
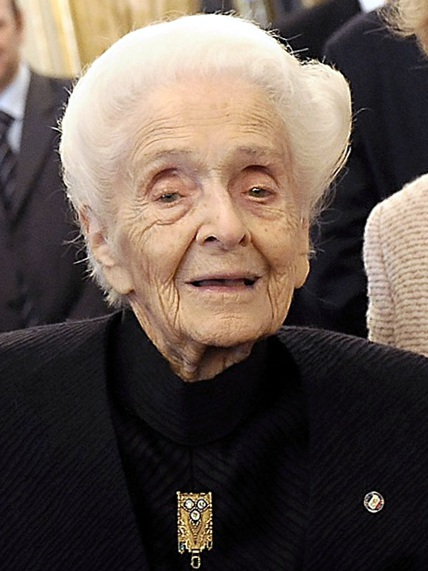
Rita Levi-Montalcini in 2009

On 1 August 2001, she was appointed as senator for life by the President of Italy, Carlo Azeglio Ciampi.

On 28–29 April 2006, Levi-Montalcini, aged 97, attended the opening assembly of the newly elected Senate, at which the President of the Senate was elected. She declared her preference for the centre-left candidate Franco Marini. Due to her support of the government of Romano Prodi, she was often criticized by some right-wing senators, who accused her of saving the government when the government's exiguous majority in the Senate was at risk. Her old age was mocked by far-right politician Francesco Storace.

== Personal life and death ==
Levi-Montalcini had an older brother, Gino, who died after a heart attack in 1974. He was one of the best-known contemporary Italian architects and a professor at the University of Turin. She had two sisters: Anna, five years older than Rita, and Paola, her twin sister, a popular artist who died on 29 September 2000, age 91.

In 2003, she filed a libel suit for defamation against comedian Beppe Grillo, who had called her – then aged 94 – an "old whore" during one of his shows.

Levi-Montalcini never married and had no children. In a 2006 interview, she said, "I never had any hesitation or regrets in this sense... My life has been enriched by excellent human relations, work and interests. I have never felt lonely." She remained active in scientific research and public life well into her later years, even attending the opening assembly of the newly elected Senate at the age of 97. She died in her home in Rome on 30 December 2012 at the age of 103. In honor of her legacy, numerous institutions, scholarships, and awards have been named after her. For instance, the Rita Levi-Montalcini Foundation was established to support education and research for young women in Africa and Italy, ensuring her impact on science and society continues to inspire future generations. Additionally, various commemorative events and memorials, including a Google Doodle on her 106th birthday, celebrate her life and contributions to neurobiology.

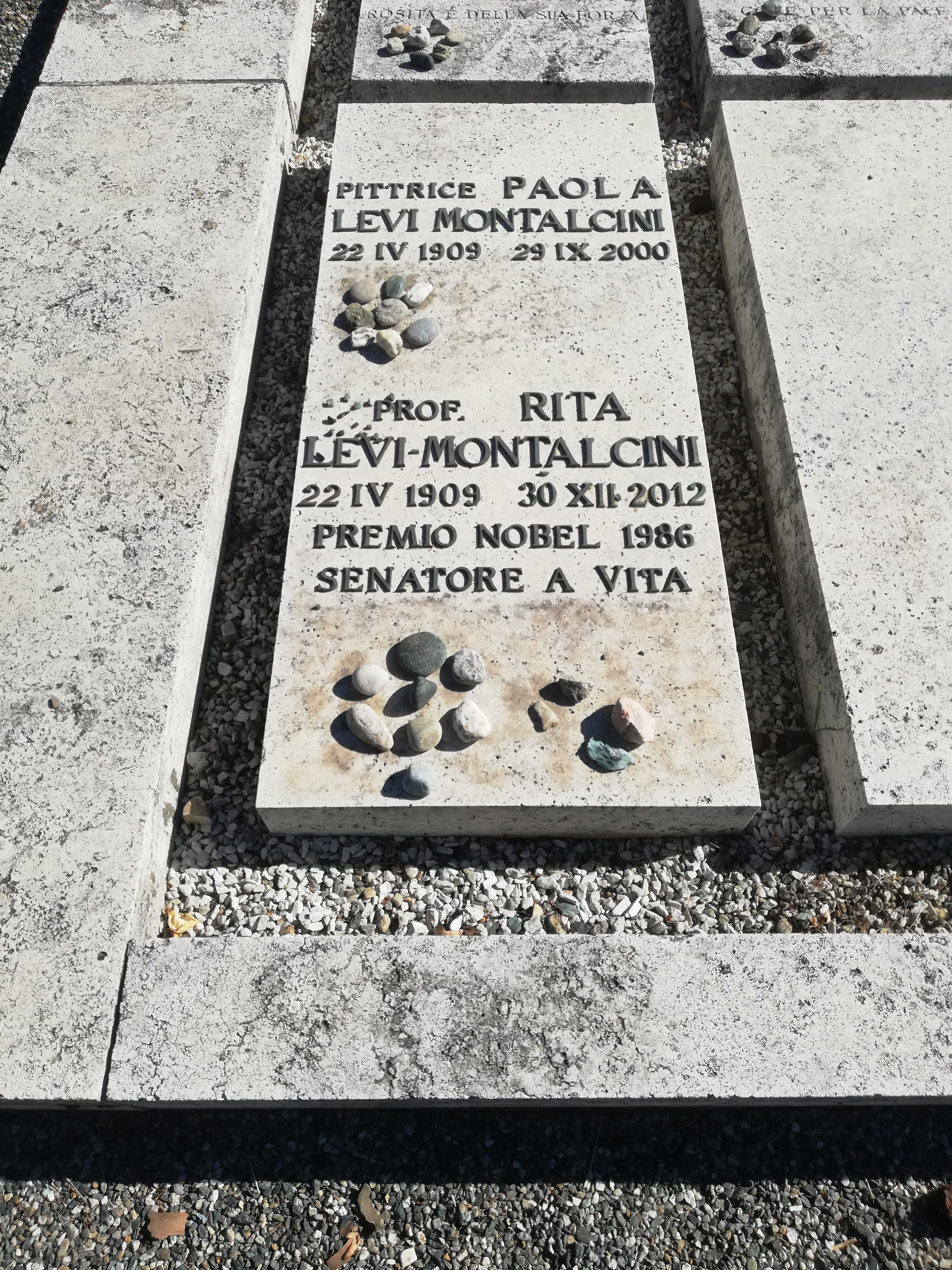
Levi-Montalcini's grave at the Monumental Cemetery in Turin, which she shares with her twin sister Paola

Upon her death, the Mayor of Rome, Gianni Alemanno, stated it was a great loss "for all of humanity." He praised her as someone who represented "civic conscience, culture and the spirit of research of our time." Italian astrophysicist Margherita Hack told Sky TG24 in a tribute to her fellow scientist, "She is really someone to be admired." Italy's prime minister, Mario Monti, paid tribute to Levi-Montalcini's "charismatic and tenacious" character and for her lifelong endeavour to "defend the battles in which she believed." Vatican spokesman Federico Lombardi praised Levi-Montalcini's civil and moral efforts, saying she was an "inspiring" example for Italy and the world.

According to the former President of the Grand Orient of Italy, she was invited and participated in many cultural events organized by the main Italian Masonic organization.

== Awards and honours ==
Year	Award	Reference
1966	Elected a Fellow of the American Academy of Arts and Sciences	
1968	Tenth woman elected to the United States National Academy of Sciences	
1970	Received the Golden Plate Award of the American Academy of Achievement	
1974	Elected EMBO member	
1974	Became a member of the Pontifical Academy of Sciences	
1983	Awarded Louisa Gross Horwitz Prize from Columbia University	
1985	Awarded Ralph W. Gerard Prize in Neuroscience	
1986	Elected to American Philosophical Society	
1986	With collaborator, Stanley Cohen, received the Nobel Prize in Medicine	
1986	ReceivedAlbert Lasker Award for Basic Medical Research	
1987	Received National Medal of Science	
1991	Received Laurea Honoris Causa in Medicine from the University of Trieste, Italy	
1995	Elected Foreign Member of the Royal Society (ForMemRS)	
1999	Nominated Goodwill Ambassador of the United Nations Food and Agriculture Organization (FAO) by FAO Director-General Jacques Diouf	
2001	Nominated senator for life by the Italian president Carlo Azeglio Ciampi	
2006	Received degree Honoris Causa in Biomedical Engineering from the Polytechnic University of Turin	
2008	Received PhD Honoris Causa from the Complutense University of Madrid, Spain	
2009	Received Leonardo da Vinci Award from the European Academy of Sciences	
2011	Received PhD Honoris Causa from McGill University, Canada	

She was a founding member of Città della Scienza. and Academician of Studium, Accademia di Casale e del Monferrato, Italy.

=== Other attributions ===
- In April 2016, a spontaneous orchid (a hybrid between Ophrys incubacea and Ophrys sphegodes subsp. classica), was named after her: 'Ophrys × montalciniae'.
- The videogame Elite Dangerous has named numerous space stations after her.
- The card game "Endowed Chairs: Neurology" features Levi-Montalcini as one of 12 neurologist Luminaries.
- On the occasion of his death, Gustavo Raffi, then Grand Master of the Grand Orient of Italy, recalled his "feelings of friendship and sincere dialogue, so much so that he was a guest at Villa del Vascello on 21 September 2002, together with Rigoberta Menchú, to talk about science and peace in the service of mankind.
- Poet Jessy Randall included a tribute to Levi-Montalcini in her 2025 collection of poems about women scientists, The Path of Most Resistance.

== Bibliography ==
- Levi-Montalcini, Rita, In Praise of Imperfection: My Life and Work.(Elogio dell'imperfezione) Basic Books, New York, 1988.
- Yount, Lisa (1996). Twentieth Century Women Scientists. New York: Facts on File. ISBN 0-8160-3173-8.
- Goldstein, Bob (2021). "A Lab of Her Own". Nautilus.
- Muhm, Myriam : Vage Hoffnung für Parkinson-Kranke – Überlegungen der Medizin-Nobelpreisträgerin Rita Levi-Montalcini, Süddeutsche Zeitung #293, p. 22. December 1986 "L'Archivio "medicina – medicine"". Larchivio.org. Archived from the original on 28 September 2011.
- Tietjen, Jill S.; Busch-Vishniac, Ilene; Busch, Lauren (2026). "Chapter 9. Rita Levi-Montalcini". Women Laureates 1970-2007: National Medal of Science and National Medal of Technology and Innovation Winners. Springer Nature. ISBN 978-3-032-23115-4.

=== Publications ===
- Origine ed Evoluzione del nucleo accessorio del Nervo abducente nell'embrione di pollo, Roma, Tip. Cuggiani, 1942.
- Il messaggio nervoso, con Pietro Angeletti e Giuseppe Moruzzi, Milano, Rizzoli, 1975.
- New developments in neurobiological research, in "Commentarii", vol. III, n. 15, Pontificia Academia Scientiarum, 1976.
- Elogio dell'imperfezione, Milano, Garzanti, 1987. ISBN 88-11-59390-5 (1999, nuova edizione accresciuta).
- NGF. Apertura di una nuova frontiera nella neurobiologia, Roma-Napoli, Theoria, 1989. ISBN 88-241-0162-3.
- Sclerosi multipla in Italia. Aspetti e problemi, con Mario Alberto Battaglia, Genova, AISM, 1989. ISBN 88-7148-001-5.
- Presentazione di Max Perutz, È necessaria la scienza?, Milano, Garzanti, 1989. ISBN 88-11-59415-4.
- Prefazione a Carlo Levi, Poesie inedite. 1934–1946, Roma, Mancosu, 1990.
- Prefazione a Gianni Bonadonna, Donne in medicina, Milano, Rizzoli, 1991. ISBN 88-17-84077-7.
- Presentazione di Gilberto Salmoni, Memoria: un telaio infinito Dialogo su un mondo tutto da scoprire, Genova, Costa & Nolan, 1993.
- Prefazione a Giacomo Scotti (a cura di), Non si trova cioccolata. Lettere di bambini jugoslavi nell'orrore della guerra, Napoli, Pironti, 1993. ISBN 88-7937-095-2.
- Reti. Scienza, cultura, economia, con Guido Cimino e Lauro Galzigna, Ancona, Transeuropa, 1993. ISBN 88-7828-101-8.
- Vito Volterra. Il suo percorso, in Scienza, tecnologia e istituzioni in Europa. Vito Volterra e l'origine del CNR, Roma-Bari, Laterza, 1993. ISBN 88-420-4147-5.
- Il tuo futuro, Milano, Garzanti, 1993. ISBN 88-11-73837-7.
- Per i settanta anni della Enciclopedia italiana, 1925–1995, in 1925–1995: la Treccani compie 70 anni. Mostra storico-documentaria, Roma, Treccani, Istituto della Enciclopedia italiana, 1995.
- Prefazione an American Medical Association, L'uso degli animali nella ricerca scientifica. Libro bianco, Bologna, Esculapio, 1995.
- Senz'olio contro vento, Milano, Baldini & Castoldi, 1996. ISBN 88-8089-198-7.
- L'asso nella manica a brandelli, Milano, Baldini & Castoldi, 1998. ISBN 88-8089-429-3.
- La galassia mente, Milano, Baldini & Castoldi, 1999. ISBN 88-8089-636-9.
- Presentazione di Nicola Canal, Angelo Ghezzi e Mauro Zaffaroni, Sclerosi multipla. Attualità e prospettive, Milano, Masson, 1999. ISBN 88-214-2467-7.
- Intervista in Serena Zoli, Storie di ordinaria resurrezione (e non). Fuori dalla depressione e altri mali oscuri, Milano, Rizzoli, 1999. ISBN 88-17-86072-7.
- L'Università delle tre culture. Conferenza della professoressa Rita Levi-Montalcini, Sondrio, Banca Popolare di Sondrio, 1999.
- Cantico di una vita, Milano, Cortina, 2000. ISBN 88-7078-666-8.
- Un universo inquieto. Vita e opere di Paola Levi Montalcini, Milano, Baldini & Castoldi, 2001. ISBN 88-8490-111-1.
- Tempo di mutamenti, Milano, Baldini & Castoldi, 2002. ISBN 88-8490-140-5.
- Tempo di azione, Milano, Baldini Castoldi Dalai, 2004. ISBN 88-8490-429-3.
- Abbi il coraggio di conoscere, Milano, Rizzoli, 2004. ISBN 88-17-00199-6.
- Lungo le vie della conoscenza. Un viaggio per sentieri inesplorati con Rita Levi-Montalcini, con Giuseppina Tripodi, Brescia, Serra Tarantola, 2005. ISBN 88-88507-56-6.
- Eva era africana, Roma, Gallucci, 2005. ISBN 88-88716-35-1.
- I nuovi magellani nell'er@ digitale, con Giuseppina Tripodi, Milano, Rizzoli, 2006. ISBN 88-17-00823-0.
- Tempo di revisione, con Giuseppina Tripodi, Milano, Baldini Castoldi Dalai, 2006. ISBN 88-8490-983-X.
- La vita intellettuale, in La vita intellettuale. Professioni, arti, impresa in Italia e nel pianeta. Atti del forum internazionale, 13 e 14 febbraio 2007, Bologna, Salone del podesta di Palazzo Re Enzo, Piazza del Nettuno, Bologna, Proctor, 2007. ISBN 978-88-95499-00-0.
- Rita Levi-Montalcini racconta la scuola ai ragazzi|Rita Levi-Montalcini con Giuseppina Tripodi racconta la scuola ai ragazzi, Milano, Fabbri, 2007. ISBN 978-88-451-4308-3.
- Le tue antenate. Donne pioniere nella società e nella scienza dall'antichità ai giorni nostri, con Giuseppina Tripodi, Roma, Gallucci, 2008. ISBN 978-88-6145-033-2.
- La clessidra della vita di Rita Levi-Montalcini, con Giuseppina Tripodi, Milano, Baldini Castoldi Dalai, 2008. ISBN 978-88-6073-444-0.
- Ritmi d'arte, Serra Tarantola, 2008. ISBN 88-95839-05-6.
- Cronologia di una scoperta, Milano, Baldini Castoldi Dalai, 2009. ISBN 978-88-6073-557-7.
- L'altra parte del mondo, con Giuseppina Tripodi, Milano, Rizzoli, 2009. ISBN 978-88-17-01529-5.

== See also ==
- Timeline of women in science
- List of Jewish Nobel laureates
