= Copionodontinae =

Scientific classification
- Kingdom: Animalia
- Phylum: Chordata
- Class: Actinopterygii
- Order: Siluriformes
- Family: Trichomycteridae
- Subfamily: Copionodontinae de Pinna, 1992

Type genus
- Copionodon de Pinna, 1992

Genera
- see text

Subfamily of fishes

The Copionodontinae are a subfamily of catfishes (order Siluriformes) of the family Trichomycteridae. It includes two genera, Copionodon and Glaphyropoma.

== Classification ==
Copionodontines are remarkably primitive in body form, and lack many of the synapomorphies previously used to diagnose the family Trichomycteridae. Little doubt exists that the Copionodontinae form a monophyletic group, diagnosed by several unambiguous synapomorphies, including a unique dentition composed of spatulate teeth not seen anywhere else in the Trichomycteridae. A few characters also support the genera Copionodon and Glaphyropoma as monophyletic subunits.

== Genera ==
Copionodontinae contains the following genera:

- Copionodon de Pinna, 1992
- Glaphyropoma de Pinna, 1992

== Distribution and ecology ==
Copionodontines occur exclusively in the Chapada Diamantina; though the plateau is drained by four river basins, so far, these fish are exclusively found in drainages associated with the Paraguaçu River.

Copionodontines occupy the upper reaches of fast-flowing streams on rocky beds, often with tiny or no water flow in the dry season. Fish tend to concentrate on quiet, deep pools, though some individuals lodge in narrow rock crevices in fast-flowing sectors. Habitat preferences also vary according to species. Water in the upper reaches of the Chapada Diamantina is cool and usually black (organic matter-stained), but copionodontines are recorded in a few clear-water streams, as well. Usually, they share their environment with few or no other fish species.
