= Isluga River =

Isluga River Rio Arabilla, Rio Sitani
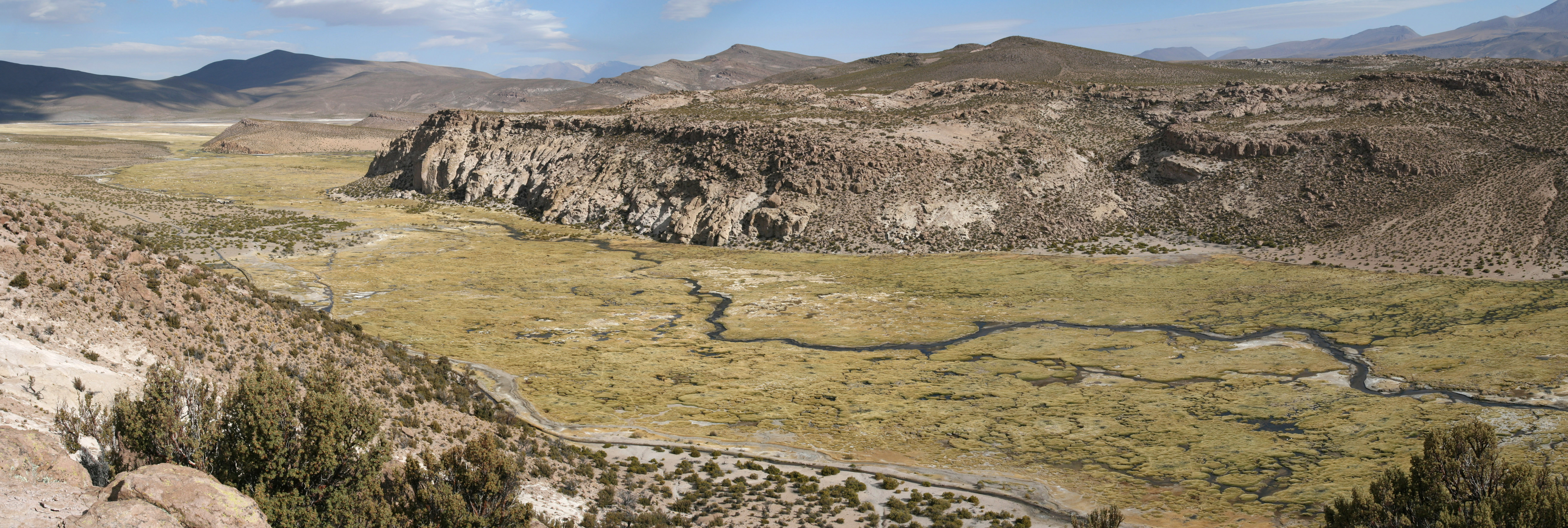
- The Isluga River flowing past a lava flow from Isluga Volcano.
- Native name: Río Isluga (Spanish)

Physical characteristics
- Source: Confluence of Chaguane and Huinchuta
- Mouth: Laguna Mucalliri, Salar de Coipasa
- Length: 54 km (34 mi)
- Basin size: 2,450 km^{2} (950 sq mi)
- Discharge
  - location: Bocatoma
  - average: 0.4–0.5 m^{3}/s (14–18 cu ft/s)
  - minimum: Less than 0.3 m^{3}/s (11 cu ft/s)
  - maximum: More than 0.75 m^{3}/s (26 cu ft/s)

Basin features
- Tributaries
  - left: Quebrada Taipicollo, Alsare
  - right: Mauque, sometimes Cariquima River is considered a tributary

Isluga River is a river in Chile and Bolivia, and is also known as Sitani or Arabilla. It starts at the confluence of the rivers Chaguane and Huinchuta and flows for 54 kilometres (34 mi) before reaching the Laguna Mucalliri of the Salar de Coipasa. It receives water from the volcanoes Isluga, Cabaray and Quimsachata as well as the Sierra Uscana.

The watershed of the river lies mainly in Chile and has a dry climate, resulting in a small river discharge of about 0.4–0.5 cubic metres per second (14–18 cu ft/s). There are a number of towns and hamlets in the catchment, as well as wetlands with a number of animal and plant species.

== Course ==
The Isluga River (also known as Sitani or Arabilla) begins at the southern foot of the 4,940 metres (16,220 ft) high Cerro Alpajeres west of the town of Chaguane at the confluence of the Chaguane and Huinchuta. In its upper parts the Isluga River is also known as the Arabilla River. The Chaguane is 12 kilometres (7.5 mi) long and receives water from the Laguna Parinacota, which in turn is nourished from two creeks that join it from the west and north. The Huinchuta (also known as Pasijro) is also 12 kilometres (7.5 mi) long but comes from the northwest and turns south before joining the Chaguane.

After the confluence, the Isluga River proceeds in southeast-eastward direction save for a brief turn northeast, past the towns of Chaguane and Arabilla; between the two the Quebrada Taipicollo joins from the northwest. After Arabilla it turns more eastward and receives waters from the Laguna Arabilla farther south; the Isluga River here passes through wetland territory. It flows past the towns of Chapicollo, Enquelca and Coraguane before turning sharply to the south. After this turn the river continues first southeast-east, then due east between Cachaguano and Isluga where it has a slight northeasterly tilt, and finally southeastward towards Sitani and Cotasaya. The penultimate part of the river runs irregularly eastward towards Colchani and Pisigua. After a total course of 54 kilometres (34 mi) before ending into the Laguna Mucalliri, which is part of a system of wetlands at Salar de Coipasa. The Cariquima River ends into the same general area and is sometimes considered to be part of the Rio Isluga. From that area, the Sitani River continues into the Salar de Coipasa proper.

The Isluga River is entrenched between river terraces. It receives several tributaries that drain the Quimsachata, Isluga and Cabaray from the north; the Alsare from Cabaray is a major tributary. From the south it receives tributaries from the Sierra Uscana, including the 54 kilometres (34 mi) long Mauque which joins the Isluga River in the Fisica Choque/Chaque wetland.

=== Watershed ===
The Isluga River drains 2,295 square kilometres (886 sq mi) of Chile's Tarapaca Region and a further 145 square kilometres (56 sq mi) of Bolivia, and lies at an average elevation of 4,187 metres (13,737 ft) elevation. The catchment of Isluga is more gentle than Pacific-draining catchments, resulting in the formation of wetlands.

The region has an arid climate. Most precipitation arrives from the Amazon and falls mainly during the summer months. This results in the region having a steppe vegetation above 3,000 metres (9,800 ft) elevation with about 300 millimetres per year (12 in/year) precipitation. Above 2,000 metres (6,600 ft) elevation lies a montane desert climate with precipitation amounting to 100–50 millimetres per year (3.9–2.0 in/year). During the Quaternary, the Altiplano was at times wetter than today, resulting in the formation of lakes.

Much of the watershed is dominated by Oligocene to Quaternary age volcanic rocks formed by basalt, basaltic andesite, andesite and dacite. In the central and eastern parts there are also sedimentary formations of Pleistocene to Holocene, including alluvial and lacustrine deposits; these sedimentary formations are concentrated in the central parts of the catchment 5,501 metres (18,048 ft) high Isluga volcano is still active, with eruptions in 1900 and 1963; other important mountains are the 5,869 metres (19,255 ft) high Cabaray and the 4,944 metres (16,220 ft) high Cerro El Fraile.

During the Pliocene-Pleistocene, tectonic uplift raised the Altiplano to heights of over 4,000 metres (13,000 ft). A number of endorheic systems such as the Lauca River and the Isluga River drain the Altiplano. Part of the Isluga catchment was covered by lakes, which have left wetlands and small lakes.

=== Discharge ===
Water temperatures at Ríos Arabilla at 3,850 metres (12,630 ft) elevation range 7–17 °C (45–63 °F). The salinity is dominated by chloride, sodium and sulfate owing to high evaporation and the dissolution of salts in the catchment. The waters are eutrophic.

A stream gauge was active at Bocatoma (between the towns of Isluga and Sitani) between 1995 and 2001, and at Puente in 1998. At Bocatoma discharge is fairly constant with the exception of the spring months; average runoff is about 0.4–0.5 cubic metres per second (14–18 cu ft/s) but can increase to over 0.75 cubic metres per second (26 cu ft/s) or decrease to less than 0.3 cubic metres per second (11 cu ft/s). A more recent report indicated a discharge of 0.5 cubic metres per second (18 cu ft/s) at the Bocatoma station.

== Biology ==
Plankton is dominated on the floral side by bacillariophyceae such as Navicula and Synedra while the faunal side is characterized by cladocerans (Alona and Bosmina), copepods (Boeckella), ostracods in shallower parts and rotifers.

Coleoptera of the genus Australelmis and chironomid flies further populate the waters. The fish Orestias agassii and Trichomycterus pencil catfishes such as Trichomycterus rivulatus live in its waters. These fish are all vulnerable or at the risk of extinction. The Peru water frog has also been found, as are several mollusc species of the taxa chilinidae and veneroida and snails of the genus Heleobia.

A number of different plant species grow in the waters of the Isluga River, such as Carex, Catabrosa verdermanni, Deschampsia caespitosa, Deyeuxia curvula, Drabella, Distichia muscoides, Distichlis humilis, Eleocharis, Festuca nardifolia, Juncus, Lilaeopsis lineata, Oxychloe andina, Potamogeton strictum, Ranunculus, Sarcocornia pulvinata, Scirpus atacamensis and Triglochin palustris. The wetlands along the river are an important environment in the Altiplano.

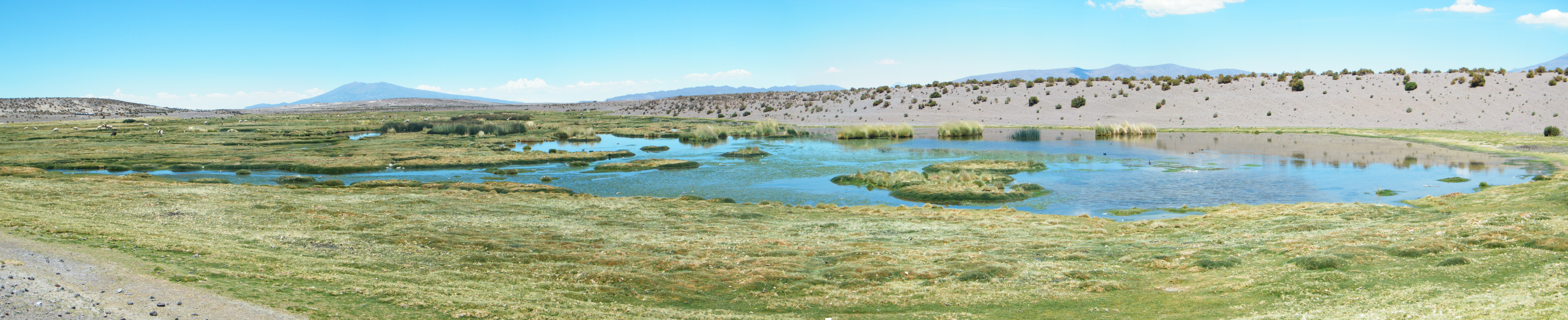
Wetland on the Isluga River

The steppes surrounding the catchment feature a flora which includes quenoa and yareta; depending on the availability of water different places are dominated by different plants. Among the fauna are flamingos and vicuñas, lizards of the genus Liolaemus, the frog Pleurodema marmoratum and the toad Rhinella spinulosa. The amphibian and reptile faunas are little known, unlike the bird fauna.

== Human activity ==
The towns of Colchane, Isluga and Pisiga lie in the watershed, which is part of the commune of Colchane. There are further hamlets and villages in the catchment of the Isluga River. Most of the watershed is undeveloped, with agriculture being the main form of land use.

Wetlands in the catchment were important for pastoralism, which along with tourism of the Volcán Isluga National Park is an important economic resource for the area. Irrigation takes place in the watershed, but there is little information on it. An old plan of a transbasin diversion envisaged transferring water from the headwaters of the Isluga River to the Quebrada de Camiña by way of a tunnel to increase the water supply to the Camiña valley. Concerns have been raised in 2011 in Bolivia about diversions of the Isluga River.

=== History ===
During the 16th century the Isluga region was part of the Caranga confederation, which extended to Lake Poopo. The Spanish Crown at that time was pursuing a plan to concentrate the native population in towns; in 1578 the border between the Corregimiento de Arica and Corregimiento de Caranga was drawn across the watershed and coincides with the present-day Chile-Bolivia border.
