= Salar del Huasco =

Salt flat in northern Chile

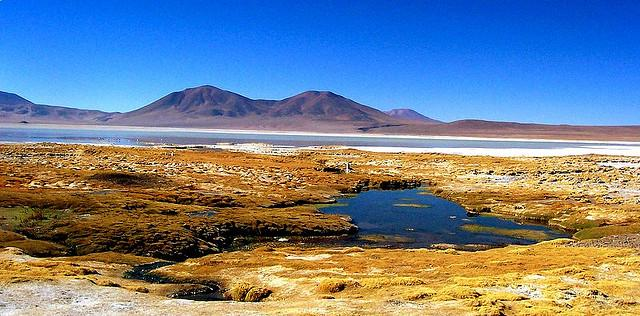
- Interactive map of Salar del Huasco
- Location: Tarapacá Region, Chile
- Coordinates: 20°18′S 68°51′W
- Area: 1,100.49 km^{2} (424.90 sq mi)
- Designation: Ramsar Site (1996)

Ramsar Wetland
- Official name: Salar del Huasco
- Designated: 2 December 1996
- Reference no.: 874

Salar del Huasco is a salt flat dotted with ponds and salt marshes, and seasonally partially covered with water, in northern Chile. It is part of Ramsar Site 874, and was, for several years, a national park. The area has a significant population of flamingos.

The salt flat is probably bordered by a fault on its western side, and a river delta forms much of its northern edge; it is now crisscrossed by stream channels. In the Pleistocene the salt flat was covered by a lake that was identified through its clay and diatomite sediments and which has left well preserved shorelines and terraces.

== Lake ==
Salar del Huasco is in Pica commune, Iquique Province, Tarapaca Region of northern Chile, about 150 kilometres (93 mi) east of Iquique. The area is largely uninhabited owing to its harsh climate. The Chilean roads A-687 and A-685 pass close to Salar del Huasco.

The salt covers a surface of about 50–60 square kilometres (19–23 sq mi) with a roughly rectangular shape, the long sides extending northwest-southeast. The component salts reach a maximum thickness of 1.5 metres (4 ft 11 in) and are distinct from sea salt, consisting mostly sodium chloride and sodium sulfate such as mirabilite, halite and gypsum; clay and silt are transported into the salt flat by wind. At the centre of the salt flat, the salt deposits are massive, but to the edges they become thinner. The salt flat is covered by an intricate web of canals and lagoons, which constitute areas with distinct flora and fauna. Open water covers an area fluctuating around 2.5 square kilometres (0.97 sq mi) mostly in the form of three waterbodies 5–15 centimetres (2.0–5.9 in) deep; during the wet season larger areas can flood. The largest of these, Laguna del Huasco or Laguna Grande, borders the salar on its western and southern side. Numerous springs surround the salar and form wetlands and water-filled ponds. Salinities vary between waterbodies, ranging from freshwater to hypersaline. The lowest altitude of the salar is about 3,770 metres (12,370 ft). A fault may cross the western side of Salar del Huasco. The salt flat is surrounded by a mostly sandy ground and two flat plains border it to the north and east, respectively: The Pampa Sillillica and the Pampa Rinconada.

In prehistorical times, a large lake formed at Salar del Huasco and left lake sediments, tufa deposits and shorelines. Water rose 15–18 metres (49–59 ft) and 30 metres (98 ft) above the present-day salar surface, forming a 110 square kilometres (42 sq mi) lake. The maximum water depth may have reached 50–55 metres (164–180 ft). A wave-cut terrace lies about 30 metres (98 ft) elevation above the salar, and a river delta formed where the Collacagua River entered the lake. The lake highstand has been correlated to Lake Tauca on the Altiplano, and its eventual drying with the Holocene Climatic Optimum. When it evaporated, it left the salts now in Salar del Huasco.

== Geology and watershed ==
The watershed of Salar de Huasco lies in the Altiplano and Andes, covering an area of about 1,500 square kilometres (580 sq mi). It is surrounded by mountain chains with volcanoes, except to the west and south where the Altos de Pica highland delimits the basin. A valley runs north-south in the basin; the Collacagua river runs along its length and Salar del Huasco lies at its southern end. The basin probably formed in the Tertiary through tectonic processes, and was initially open to the east until volcanic activity at the beginning of the Quaternary closed it there. Volcanic rocks and sediments formed by the erosion of volcanic rocks and older outcrops filled the basin, which was affected by faulting and the emplacement of ignimbrites, the last of which was erupted 280,000 years ago. It is a closed basin, meaning that water does not exit it except through evaporation. Three separate aquifers have formed in the basin fill, and are hydrologically connected both to the Collacagua River and the Salar del Huasco. These aquifers are an important water source to Salar del Huasco, helping it to maintain an open water surface, and assuming lack of human interference would buffer the impacts of climate change on the salar. There may be connections between these aquifers and these of Pica west of Salar del Huasco.

The Collacagua River enters Salar del Huasco on its northern shore; it is the principal watercourse of the region and one of the few to permanently carry water, but its waters do not reach the salar directly except during floods. It is about 43 kilometres (27 mi) long and forms through the union of the easterly Piga and the northern Caquina rivers, far north from Salar del Huasco. Otherwise, clockwise from north to south the Quebrada Huallacaibo, Quebrada Rinconada, Quebrada del Corregidor, Quebrada de Huasco and Quebrada Parilca and several nameless creeks join the salar. Salar del Huasco is the principal source of water for the area.

== Climate, flora and fauna ==
The salar area has a cold desert climate with a mean annual temperature not exceeding 5 °C (41 °F). Strong temperature variations between day and night, when temperatures can descend below −20 °C (−4 °F) and frost develops around waterbodies. Most precipitation falls during the (southern) summer months when moist air arrives from the Atlantic Ocean via the Amazon. Precipitation varies strongly between years, due to climate oscillations like the El Niño-Southern Oscillation; at Collacagua, mean annual precipitation between 1961 and 2000 reached 134 millimetres (5.3 in) but in the salar area itself it is likely less than 100 millimetres (3.9 in) per year. The air is thin, insolation is high and strong winds blow. During the ice ages, glaciers formed on the mountains and left moraines.

The vegetation consists of a high-elevation steppe and includes several endemic and globally important species, like Polylepis tarapacana and the yareta. In the salar itself, there are surface sediments where most organic productivity is situated, and anaerobic sediments at depth. Several plant communities are found, including bofedales wetlands with Oxychloe andina and Zameioscirpus atacamensis and salt meadows with Carex misera. Mammals include Andean foxes, llamas, tuco-tucos, vicuñas and vizcachas. Other animals (Note: Animals eaten by fish include beetles, caddisflies, cladocerans, copepods, crustaceans, flies, gastropods, odonata, oligochaetes, ostracods, planarians, rotifers and spiders) are Trichomycterus and Orestias fishes, the Peru water and Telmatobius chusmisensis frogs, Liolaemus lizards, Biomphalaria snails and oribatid mites. These fish are also found in the Isluga River watershed; most likely they came to Huasco through a past connection with the Salar de Uyuni.

Noted birds at Salar del Huasco include Andean avocets, Andean condors, Andean flamingos, Andean goose, Andean gulls, Andean lapwings, Andean negritos, Baird's sandpipers, black-crowned night herons, buff-winged cinclodes, Chilean flamingo, crested ducks, giant coots, James's flamingo, least seedsnipes, lesser yellowlegs, nandus, nuthatchers, Puna plovers, Puna teal, puna tinamous, silvery grebes, Wilson's phalaropes, yellow-billed pintail and yellow-billed teals. (Note: Older research found American coots, buff-breasted earthcreepers, mountain caracaras, ornate tinamous, scale-throated earthcreepers and white-banded mockingbirds) There are more than three thousand flamingos at Salar del Huasco, which is their nesting site. Salar del Huasco is a major stopover for bird migrations of American golden plovers, Baird's sandpipers, lesser yellowlegs and peregrine falcons.

The ecosystem at Salar del Huasco is very diverse and is used as a stand-in for other Chilean salar ecosystems. Both the flora and fauna include numerous endemics and some species may yet be discovered. Other species are threatened species. Humans hunt waterbirds, and overgrazing has occurred in the area, but overall human impact on Salar del Huasco's land ecosystem is small.

=== Microbial ecosystems ===
Salar del Huasco has been investigated for its microbial inhabitants. Their communities are dominated by bacteria if viruses aren't counted, with a number of unidentified genera. Environmental conditions are extreme, with the lack of water, harsh climate, high insolation, intense wind-driven mixing, lack of oxygen at high elevations and plenty of toxic arsenic, and the genomes of microbes found at Salar del Huasco show evidence of adaptations. Various metabolic pathways have been identified in microbes from Salar del Huasco, with different prevalences in different parts of the salar; they include nitrogen fixation and different kinds of photosynthesis. Various antibiotic substances are produced by microbes from Salar del Huasco. Some bacteria form microbial mats. Salar del Huasco is the type locality of the choanoflagellate Salpingoeca huasca, the gregarine Xiphocephalus ovatus and the bacteria Streptomyces altiplanensis and Streptomyces huasconensis.

== Human exploitation and conservation ==
Numerous archeological sites (Note: With lithic artifacts.) are found around the salar. They go back to the last ice age, when the lake was larger and its environment drew hunter-gatherers to Salar del Huasco. Populations persisted after it dried up. Animal corrals and trails have been mapped around Salar del Huasco. Later archaeological sites have been linked to the Inca presence in northern Chile; El Tojo in the Huasco basin is the reference site for Inca activities in the region, where an Inca road connected Pica with the Altiplano and was frequently used in historic times. In the 20th century, the area of the salar was used for pastures.

Tourists visit Salar del Huasco for its animal life and the spectacular environment, and the salar is an important destination in the region. The salar is well preserved and the Chilean government has identified Huasco as an important environmental site; in 1996 it was declared a Ramsar site. The Salar del Huasco National Park was declared on 5 June 2010, reversed in February 2014, due to failure to involve the indigenous population in the process, then reinstated in March 2023. Numerous national organizations are involved in managing the site, but they cannot always enforce protections.

In the late 20th century, there were proposals to obtain water from Salar del Huasco for irrigation in Pica. A concession for the exploitation of the Huasco aquifer in 1889 was reduced again in 1890. The copper mining industry of northern Chile requires water, and the Collahuasi mining company obtained a licence to draw water from the salar from the Chilean state despite the Ramsar protection. As of 2020, water rights in the Huasco basin are held by the native people through the Asociación indígena Aymara Laguna del Huasco. Water withdrawals have caused significant damage in the Salar del Huasco area; whether they have effects on Pica is unclear — the groundwater bodies are not connected but excessive withdrawals from Huasco could cause a shift in the underground drainage divide and thus reduce flows to Pica — with communities in Pica concerned about potential water losses. The salt flat has been evaluated as a source of sodium sulfate.
