= Isluga =

Mountain in Chile

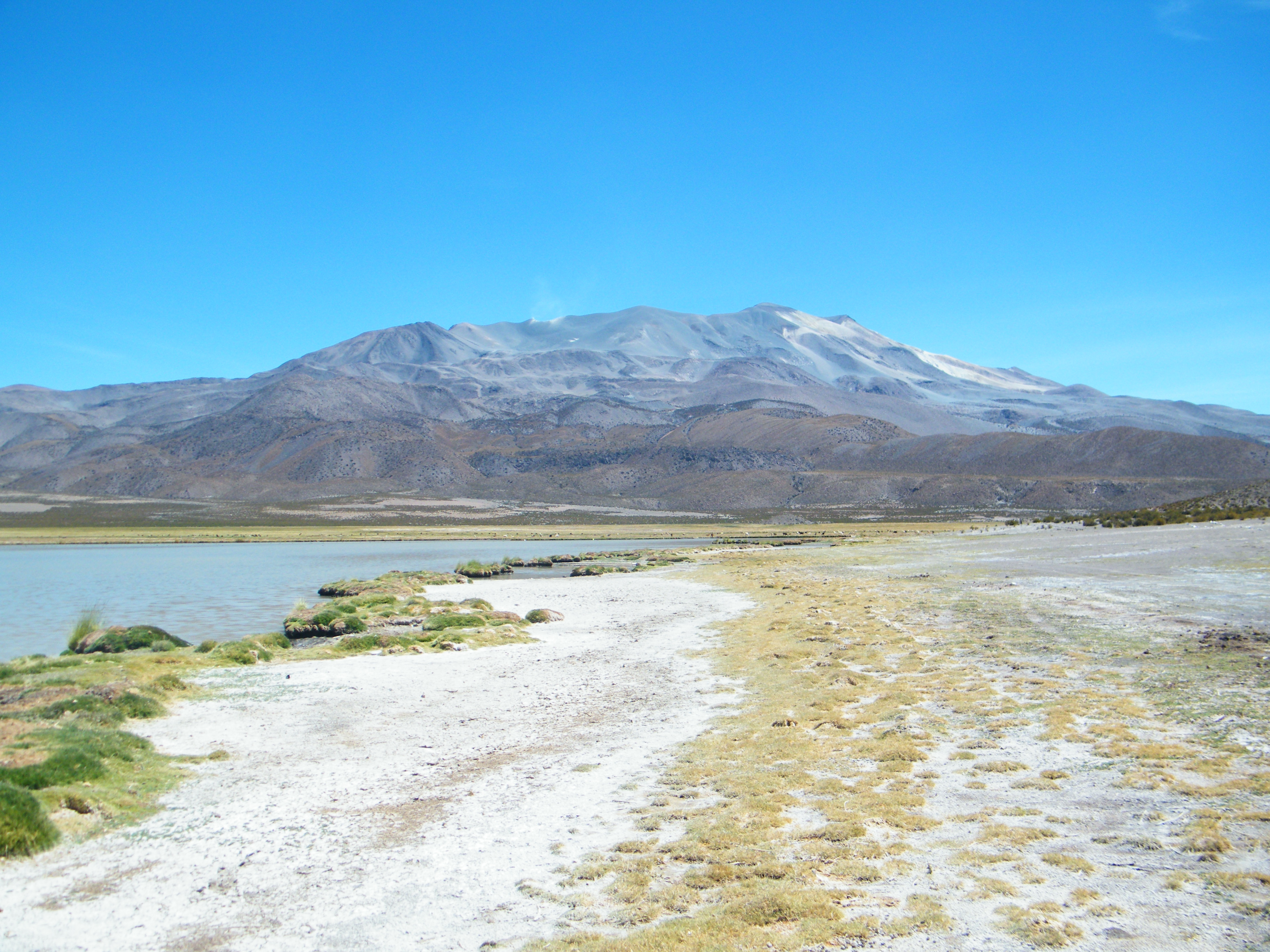
- Isluga volcano

Highest point
- Elevation: 5,550 m (18,210 ft)
- Coordinates: 19°09′S 68°50′W

Geography
- Location within Chile
- Location: Colchane, Chile
- Parent range: Andes

Geology
- Rock age: Holocene
- Mountain type: Stratovolcano
- Volcanic zone: Central Volcanic Zone
- Last eruption: 1913

Isluga (Spanish pronunciation: [isˈluɣa]) is a dormant stratovolcano in Chile's Tarapacá Region, close to the border with Bolivia. It is part of the Volcán Isluga National Park and lies in the Central Volcanic Zone of the Andes, one of several volcanic belts in the Andean Volcanic Belt. Isluga is an elongated mountain, whose summit reaches an altitude of 5,559 metres (18,238 ft) above sea level, and features a summit crater. It forms a chain of volcanoes with several of its neighbours in the east. Sulfur mining took place on Isluga in the past. Polylepis trees grow at 4,900 metres (16,100 ft) on the volcano.

The volcano began to form about half a million years ago during the Pleistocene in multiple stages, and there is evidence of historical eruptions which caused damage to neighbouring settlements. The last clearly attested eruption was in 1913, but more recent events in 1960 and 2005 are possible. Presently, there are conspicuous fumaroles on the volcano that generate gas plumes visible from the foot of the mountain. There are archaeological sites on the mountain and at its foot, and it has religious importance for the surrounding people.

== Name ==
Isluga is the Spanish name of the mountain; the native names are Jiwq’ir qullu (Volcano Hill) or Jeoq'er Qollu, or Laram Qawani (Blue Valley), Laram Qhawani or Laram Kabani. These two names might refer to distinct aspects of the volcano, one to its physical and the other to its spiritual aspect. The etymology of Isluga is unclear, as it appears neither in the Quechua nor the Aymara language. One possible derivation is from "Islo", a plain in Alto Camiña. Other possibilities are that the name might come from the Kunza or Uru-Chipaya languages, the latter may contain a related word sluga. Other spellings are Islonga, Isluca and Ysluga; Ilaga may be an alternative form, Isluya is a misspelling.

== Geography ==
Isluga lies in the commune of Colchane, of the El Tamarugal Province of Chile's Tarapacá Region. It is 5 km from the border with Bolivia and about 200 kilometres (120 mi) east of Iquique. The town Enquelga is below the volcano at the foot of its lava flows. Among the other localities around Isluga are Chinchillani, Pampa Condorire and Payacollo northwest, and Carahuana/Caraguano, Chapicollo, Colchane (Note: 24 kilometres (15 mi) southeast from the volcano.) Cotasaya, Enquelga, Escapiña, Isluga, Mucomucone, Pisiga (on the Bolivian frontier) and Taipicollo south-southeast of Isluga. Farming and pasture constitute the principal economic activities of the area.

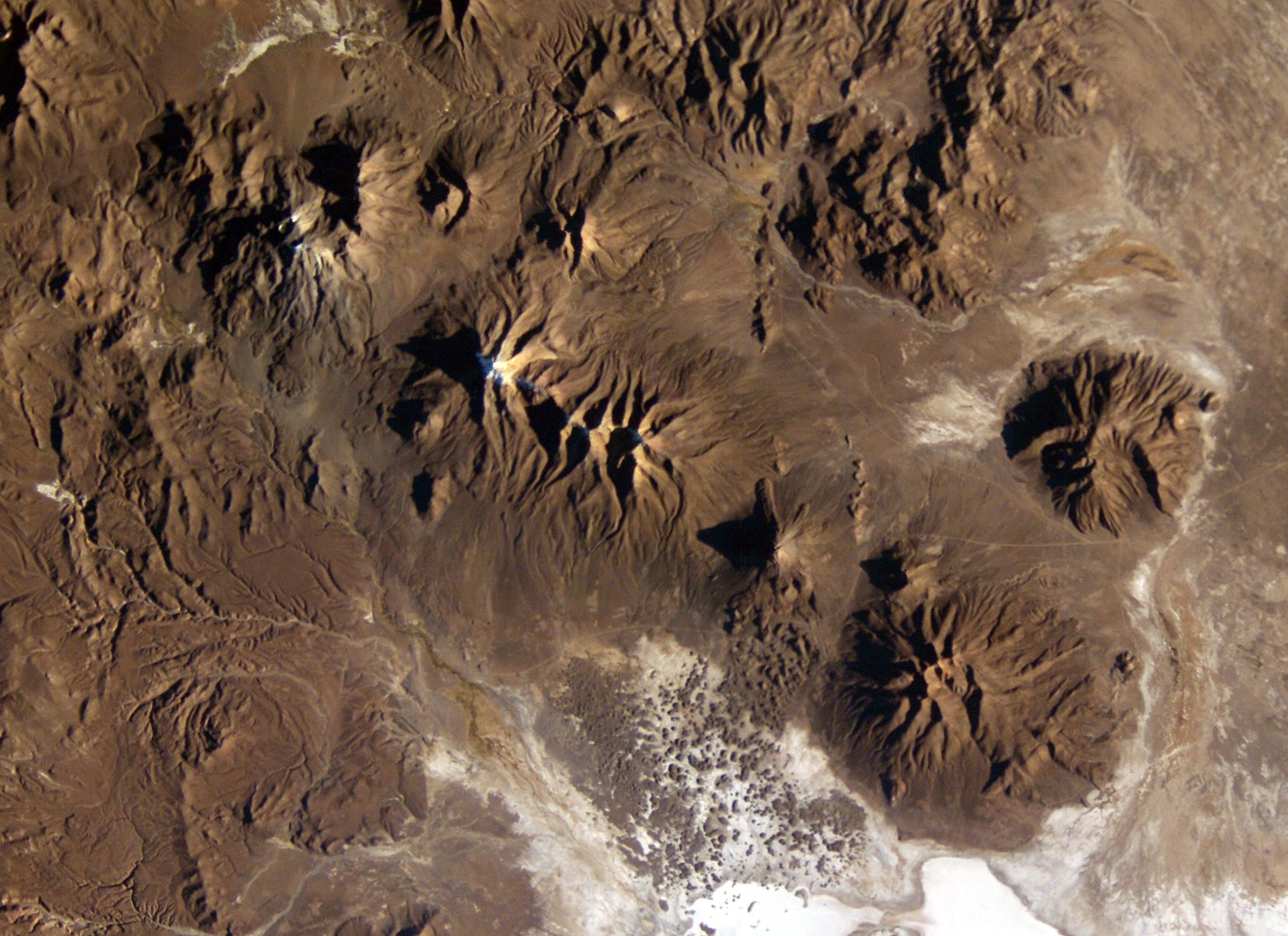
The broad Isluga volcanic complex is visible in the upper left corner of this Expedition 9 image.

The highest point of Isluga lies at 5,559 metres (18,238 ft) altitude, (Note: There are other elevation estimates.) rising about 1.2 km-1.6 km above the surrounding terrain. The volcano has at least three (Note: Some sources say five: Three on the southern flank and two on the summit.) separate summit craters on a plateau west of the summit, which form an east-west trending line. The currently active crater is 400 metres (1,300 ft) wide with steep rims, and is surrounded by a ring of volcanic scoria. Unconsolidated ash and pumice partially fill the crater, and pyroclastic rocks, sulfur crusts, scoria and volcanic ash crop out inside and in places where erosion has cut into the summit plateau. The summit plateau itself may be a former crater (which would make Isluga a somma volcano) and the summit of Isluga has been interpreted as a partially filled amphitheatre-shaped valley created by a lateral eruption to the northwest.

The volcano is a stratovolcano with the shape of a broad cone and consists of lava domes, conspicuous lobate blocky lava flows with well-developed forms such as levees and ogives, as well as lahars, pyroclastic flows, pyroclastic rock fragments and tephra. Lava flows are tens of metres thick and reach lengths of multiple kilometres, and occur mainly on the northern and southern flank of the volcano. The edifice has a probable volume of 50 cubic kilometres (12 cu mi)-61 cubic kilometres (15 cu mi) (Note: The surface area covered by the edifice is uncertain, with estimates of 60 square kilometres (23 sq mi) or 214 square kilometres (83 sq mi).) and formed on lava domes from an older volcano. One report mentions the existence of a caldera. Isluga forms a horseshoe-shaped volcanic complex with the 5400 m or 5516 m high Quimsachatas northeast of the volcano, and the 5,060 metres (16,600 ft) high Cerros Alpajeres form a lava dome that constitutes a western spur of Isluga.

There are no glaciers on mountains in the area, as the climate is too dry to allow their development, but some lava flows emplaced in the last 100,000 years bear evidence of glaciation. Lava flows have filled in some glacial valleys. Isluga is part of two watersheds, both of which eventually drain through Bolivia into the Salar de Coipasa (Note: The Isluga River does not always reach the salar.): The Rio Todos los Santos to the northwest and the Isluga River to the south. Both originate in springs at the foot of the volcano, the waters that form the Isluga converge into Laguna Arabilla to form the river. The waters of the Isluga River during the 19th century were used for irrigation. Lake Parajaya lies north of Isluga.

=== Human activities ===
Agriculture in the valleys and pastures are the main economic activities in the area; tourist infrastructure includes camping, picnic areas and the hot springs of Enquelga but in 1988 tourism did not play much of a role yet. The volcano is within the Parque Nacional Volcan Isluga (Note: The Parque Nacional Volcan Isluga was founded on the 3 January 1967, although a proper infrastructure and institutions were not developed until years later, and named after the volcano. It was shrunk in 1985 during the Augusto Pinochet era; presumably this was the downsizing that aimed at restoring some land to Indigenous communities) (PNVI), which disallows mining and restricts the extraction of natural resources.

The remote volcano can be accessed through the International Route 55, which is sometimes flooded out during bad weather. There is a trekking route leading to the summit of the volcano, which offers a panoramic view of the Altiplano. Sunburns, bad weather, animal (puma) encounters, and altitude sickness need to be watched for. As of 2026 park rules prohibit open fires, the introduction of exotic animals or disturbance of native animals, leaving the trails, damage or pollution to watercourses, the use of drones, noise, drug or alcohol use.

Sulfur mining on the Central Andean volcanoes, including Isluga, began during the 19th century. The sulfur deposits of Isluga were of regional importance and considered of high quality. Mining took place in the summit region, with activities attested in 1887; the sulfur was used for the processing of saltpeter. The volcano has been considered in evaluations of potential geothermal energy sources in Chile.

== Geology ==
Off the western coast of South America, the Nazca Plate subducts under the South America Plate. This subduction process is responsible for the existence of the Andean Volcanic Belt, part of the wider Pacific Ring of Fire. Four gaps without volcanic activity subdivide the Andean Volcanic Belt into the Northern Volcanic Zone (NVZ), Central Volcanic Zone (CVZ), Southern Volcanic Zone (SVZ) and Austral Volcanic Zone (AVZ). (Note: Unlike the other three zones, volcanism here is caused by the subduction of the Antarctic Plate.) The CVZ extends from southern Peru to northern Chile and includes more than a thousand volcanoes such as Taapaca, Parinacota, Guallatiri, Isluga, Tata Sabaya, Irruputuncu, Aucanquilcha, Ollagüe, San Pedro, Paniri, Uturuncu, Lascar, Cerro Overo, Socompa, Lastarria and the Altiplano-Puna volcanic complex. About 50 CVZ volcanoes were active during the Holocene but their activity is poorly known owing to their remote location. Lascar erupted more than 30 times since the 19th century, making it the most active volcano of the Central Andes.

The regional landscape is characterized by a tectonic depression to the west, the Occidental Cordillera in the centre, and the Altiplano to the east, with the focus of the CVZ in the Occidental Cordillera. Several cycles of volcanic and tectonic activity took place in the region from the Mesozoic to the Tertiary, followed by a state of quiescence interrupted only by major volcanic eruptions and characterized by water and glacial erosion. The terrain under Isluga consists of ignimbrites and volcanic rocks (mainly andesite, but also basalt and basaltic andesite), which formed during a Miocene flare-up of volcanic activity. In the early Pleistocene, volcanic activity settled into a steady state, during which it became concentrated in the volcanic arc of the Cordillera Occidental.

East of Isluga lie the volcanoes Cabaraya/Cabaray (5860 m), Separaya/Cibaray (5470 m or 5420 m), Tata Sabaya (5385 m), Paryani/Sacasani/Saxani (5090 m) and Villa Pucarani. The first four are situated on a geological lineament together with Isluga. Such east-west lineaments are common in the Chilean volcanic belt; whether the Isluga lineament is tectonically active is unclear. The lineament appears to separate the Antofalla craton of Proterozoic age to the north from the Chilenia terrane to the south. A 180 kilometres (110 mi) long gap (Pica gap) in the volcanic arc begins south of Isluga, where Holocene volcanism is absent and there are several discontinuities in the geological structure of the Andes. Southwest of Isluga is the Puchuldiza geothermal field, with fumaroles and hot springs, which is sometimes linked to the volcano.

=== Composition ===
Isluga has erupted andesite, trachyandesite and trachydacite, which define a potassium-rich calc-alkaline suite. Component minerals of the rocks are amphibole, iron-titanium oxides and plagioclase, with biotite and pyroxene subordinate. Some rocks bear evidence of hydrothermal alteration, especially in the northern and eastern sector of the volcano. There are sulfur deposits on the slopes and the summit region both of Isluga and of neighbouring volcanoes.

Typical processes in the formation of CVZ magmas are the erosion of the continental crust at the trench, the absorption of crustal rocks by magma and the melting and dewatering of the downgoing oceanic crust, with crustal assimilation especially important considering the thick crust of the Central Andes. In the case of Isluga, magmas initially formed in the mantle and were mafic. As they ascended into the crust, garnet fractionation and the absorption of rocks from the lower crust took place. Under Isluga and Tata Sabaya they underwent further fractionation of plagioclase and pyroxene in the middle crust and of amphibole, biotite and plagioclase in the upper crust.

== Eruption history ==
The volcano formed in several stages beginning 566,000±16,000 years ago. Initially, a pre-Isluga stage of volcanism ("Colchane Group") during the Pleistocene formed the volcanoes Cabaray, Quimsachata and Carcanchuni as well as the Cerro Blanco rocks south of Isluga; Isluga grew on top of rocks from this older stage. Radiometric dating has yielded ages of 500,000-100,000 years for rocks in the southeastern sector of Isluga, and of 100,000-50,000 years for the western and southwestern sectors. Two different staging systems have been proposed: The first envisages an Enquelga Unit, followed by the three Isluga Units and the Postavalanche Unit; the first crops out at the southern foot of the volcano while the other four units make up the bulk of the edifice. A major sector collapse to the northwest took place after the third stage; lava flows of the Postavalanche Unit cover the deposits of the debris avalanche. The second features a lower first stage, an upper second stage, followed by a third stage west and southwest of the summit and a fourth stage forming the summit region. The fourth unit, which is assumed to be of Holocene age on morphological criteria, bears evidence of sub-Plinian eruptions, far-reaching lahars and phreatomagmatic eruptions that spilled base surges over the summit.

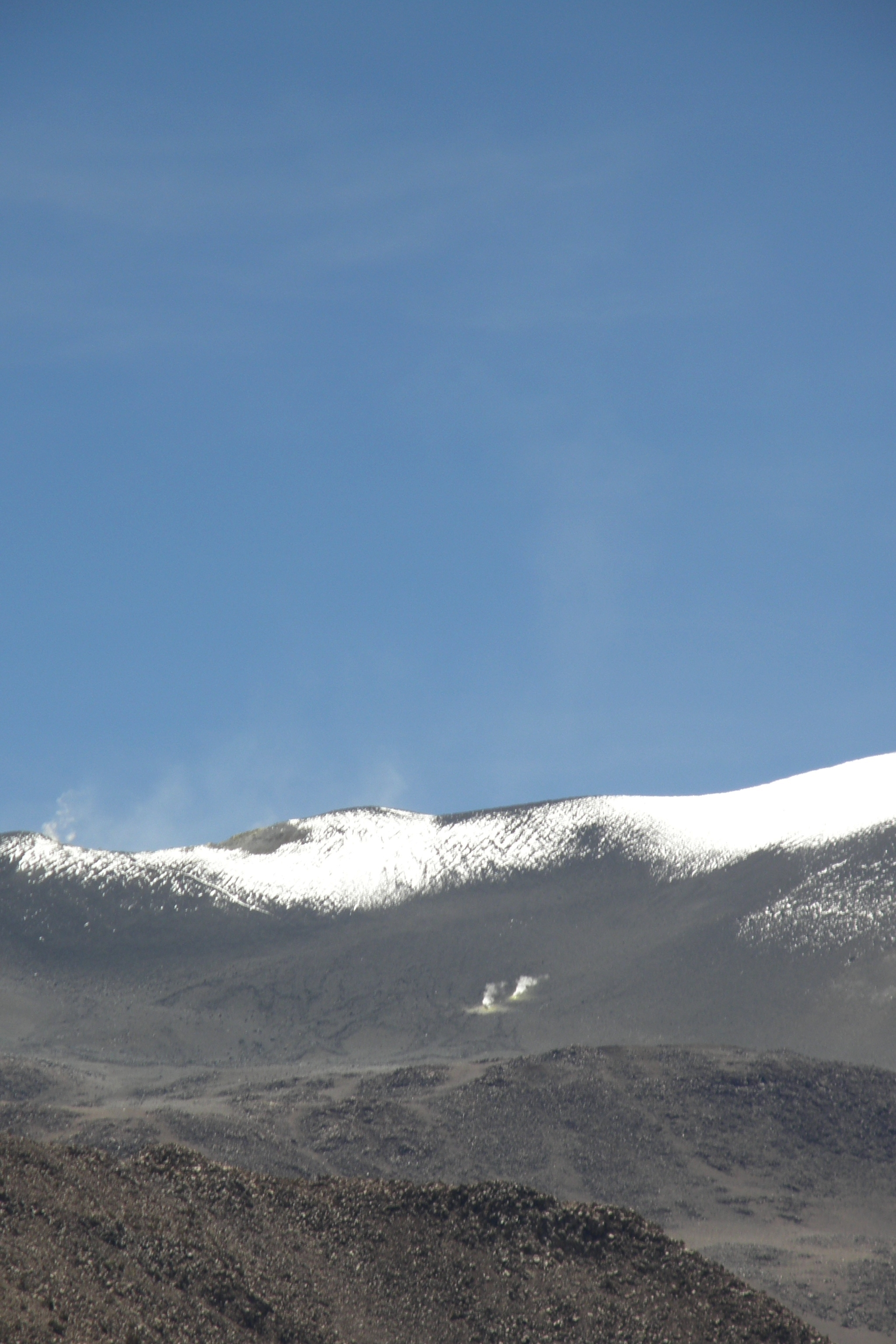
The summit and crater rim of Isluga, with faintly visible fumaroles

Historical eruptions are known from the summit crater:

- August 1863. Weak eruption and its existence is contentious.
- August 1869
- February 1878. Strong eruption with the emission of lava flows that allegedly destroyed numerous towns around the volcano. The existence of this eruption, which may be linked to a strong earthquake that year, is however contentious, and reports may reflect the effects of the earthquake rather than the volcano.
- 1885. Weak eruption.
- 1913. This is the most recent eruption of the volcano and was a phreatomagmatic eruption; it deposited scoria around the crater and may be responsible for reports that light of volcanic activity was reflected in fumarole emissions in 1914.

Other, less certain eruptions are recorded from 1868 after the 1868 Arica earthquake, 1870, 1877, December 1960 which is sometimes cited as the last eruption of the volcano, April 2002 when fumarolic activity increased and there were underground noises and increased seismic activity, and 2005, which may be a phreatic eruption linked to the 2005 Tarapaca earthquake. 19th century observers noted rumbling sounds, and earthquakes in the region were attributed to it. Seismic activity, while recorded and felt by people nearby, is relatively sparse at Isluga but with some variation in time (e.g volcanic tremors in 2013), and there is no evidence for ongoing deformation of the edifice.

There is widespread fumarolic activity on Isluga, covering about half of the main crater and an area half a kilometre below it on the southern flank, where there is a small jet-like fumarole. Fumaroles are visible from the foot of the mountain especially during low wind conditions in the form of "black smoke", vapour plumes that rise about 200 metres (660 ft) above the summit, and "burning lights" observed by people during nighttime. According to an 1914 report, the fumaroles had a light blue colour. Hot spots with temperature anomalies on the order of 10–30 °C (18–54 °F) have been observed by satellite. The fumaroles release mainly carbon dioxide, sulfur dioxide and water vapour with lesser quantities of hydrogen and hydrogen sulfide, the composition of the gas indicates that it originates mainly in magma derived from the Nazca plate slab. The sulfur dioxide emissions at a rate of about 78,000 kilograms per day (0.90 kg/s) as of 2015 are among the most important in the CVZ. Fumarole activity increased in 2002-2003, and another spike of fumarolic and seismic activity in 2012 may be related to changes in the hydrothermal system or the intrusion of new magma. A hot spring 2 kilometres (1.2 mi) east of Isluga is associated with the volcano, and the Chusmiza hot springs have been attributed to it.

== Flora and fauna ==
The vegetation surrounding Isluga is a high-Andes steppe, with a diverse (Note: Apart from the scheme described here, there are other classification schemes. A list of plant species encountered there is available.) vegetation depending on water availability. Grasses (Deyeuxia breviaristata, Festuca orthophylla and Pycnophyllum molle) and bushes (Adesmia leucopogon, Astragalus arequipensis, Parastrephia lucida, Parastrephia quadrangularis and Senecio sp.) constitute pajonales, which grow on sandy soil. In rocky terrain at higher altitudes are cushion plants (Azorella compacta, associated with Festuca orthophylla, Nothotriche pulverulenta, Pycnophyllum molle and Senecio adenophyllus), tussock grasses and Polylepis tarapacana woodlands. In wet places Azolla filiculoides, Carex incurva, Distichia muscoides, Festuca rigescens, Gentiana prostata, Lilaeopsis macrolepis, Oxychloe andina and Werneria pygmaea form the wetland vegetation type bofedal which is important for pastures. Lichens, Lampayo communities, Echinopsis atacamensis groves and other cactus plants, and crops (garlic, potato and quinoa) complete the flora around Isluga. Plant growth extends to an altitude of 4,900 metres (16,100 ft); the Polylepis trees growing at 4,900 metres (16,000 ft) according to a 1961 source formed the highest timberline on Earth.

The guanaco is the main large animal in the region. Other mammals are alpaca, Andean hairy armadillo, Andean mountain cat, Andean mountain cavy, chinchilla, common yellow-toothed cavy, culpeo, llama, mountain degu, Pampas cat, puma, skunk, South American fox, vicuña and vizcacha; sheep were introduced during the colonial era. Bird species include Anas flavirostris (yellow-billed teal), Asthenes (canastero), Bubo magellanicus (lesser horned owl), Diglossa carbonaria (grey-bellied flowerpiercer), Fulica ardesiaca (Andean coot), Fulica gigantea (giant coot), Leptasthenura aegithaloides (plain-mantled tit-spinetail), Lessonia rufa (Austral negrito), Lophonetta specularioides (crested duck), Metriopelia melanoptera (black-winged ground dove), Nothoprocta ornata (ornate tinamou), Phoenicopterus chilensis (Chilean flamingo), Phoenicopterus jamesi (James' flamingo) which was originally discovered at Isluga, Plegadis ridgwayi (Puna ibis), Podiceps occipitalis (silvery grebe), Pterocnemia pennata (Darwin's rhea), Rhodopis vesper (oasis hummingbird), Spatula puna (Puna teal), Tinamotis pentlandii (Puna tinamou) and Vultur gryphus (condor). Many of these birds live in the wetlands, with Laguna Arabilla and its wetland particularly important. Other animals at Isluga are the freshwater snail Biomphalaria aymara, the lizard Liolaemus islugensis, the fish Orestias agassii and Trichomycterus rivulatus, the Peru water frog and the toad Rhinella spinulosa.

== Climate ==
The regional climate is windy, cold and dry. Below 4,000 metres (13,000 ft) altitude, temperatures range between 10–0 °C (50–32 °F), while above that elevation they range −5–5 °C (23–41 °F). Above 5,200 metres (17,100 ft) lies perennial snow although snow cover varies between seasons and from one year to the other, sometimes it is completely absent and sometimes it covers the whole mountain. Temperature variation between day and night is more intense than between the seasons, and nighttime low temperatures in winter can reach −15 °C (5 °F).

There are or were weather stations in the town of Isluga and Colchane. The Isluga station between 1977 and 1991 recorded a mean annual precipitation of 111.6 millimetres (4.39 in). Most recorded precipitation falls during summer as part of the so-called "Bolivian Winter". The aridity of the Atacama Desert is due to a combination of the cold Peru Current suppressing Pacific Ocean moisture, the rainshadow of the Andes blocking Amazon moisture from reaching the region, and the atmospheric air descending and drying in the horse latitudes. The arid climate set in many millions of years ago, with fluctuations during e.g the early Holocene when the climate became moister between 14,000 and 9,500 years ago.

== Human history ==
Human arrived in the region around 10,000 BCE. Beginning 4,000-3,000 BCE, populations concentrated in the Andes and along the coast as the climate grew harsher, with plant domestication beginning about 3,000 BCE. During the subsequent millennia, various environments were settled, llamas and then alpacas were domesticated, and proper towns formed. This epoch is known as the Archaic Period, which is scarcely documented around Isluga. It ended about 1,500 BCE, yielding to the Formative Period from which several archaeological sites around Isluga (Pukara de Isluga) are attested. After 300 AD, the influence of the Altiplano civilization of Tiwanaku has been noted in the region especially at Pukara de Isluga. The Inca Emperor Tupac Yupanqui (1471-1493) initiated the occupation of the region by the Inka Empire, which took about half a century. It involved neither military occupation nor formal cultural changes, but the Inca resettled populations and built infrastructure like new canals and roads. The Spanish conquest had drastic impacts, including a notable population decline in the region. The Spanish christianized the region and instituted the Encomienda system which disrupted local communities. The town Isluga is attested since 1705. The Isluga area is a key region for the reconstruction of ancient history in the region, and preserving the local Aymara communities was part of the purpose of the PNVI as far back as 1988.

A triangular stone structure on the summit of Isluga is probably an Inca archaeological site, although its purpose is unclear. There are traces of at least one site at the foot of the mountain and of wood used as signpost. Such mountaintop sites are widespread in the Central Andes and there are further ones on the mountains close to Isluga. Further archaeological sites are west and especially south of Isluga; they include fortifications known as pucaras, lithic deposits, tombs including chullpas, towers and pre-Columbian villages. Notable are the fortification of Pukar Qollu/Pukara de Isluga and the prehistoric cemeteries of Chok'e Qollo, Chullpas de Sitani, Cistas de Najrraya and Usamaya close to the town of Isluga; Isluga itself has maintained the character of an Andean village and features a colonial-era church that is a Chilean national monument.

== Mythology and religious importance ==
Isluga is a sacred mountain, among the holiest in the region especially for Enquelga. Its inhabitants considered it the wife of its neighbour Cabaray, and it was implored for rain, riches and health. The Chipaya people used to implore hills and mountains like Isluga to not let the winds blow. Many Aymara and Uru-Chipaya communities view the Isluga area as their place of origin.

The volcano also features in mythology. Numerous supernatural beings were thought to associate with the mountain, as well as some Christian miracles. Many of these supernatural beings are potentially dangerous; the fumaroles for example were thought to become irritated if people approached them, and the waters issuing from Isluga were considered "evil". Other tales feature battles (in which Isluga took part) between the male mountains Tata Sabaya and Sajama for the female mountain Tunupa or the exile of another mountain Esmeralda/Huantajaya who used to dwell on Isluga and its neighbours to the coast.

== Threats and monitoring ==
Isluga is a potentially active volcano; the Chilean SERNAGEOMIN considers it the 41th most dangerous volcano (out of 87) in Chile, making it a medium-risk volcano by their definition. SERNAGEOMIN operates a webcam at the volcano and records seismic activity. The volcano is potentially a source of the arsenic that contaminates regional watercourses.

The volcano was monitored by OVDAS as of 2021. Informal volcano hazard maps have been published; they show that lava flow and volcanic bomb hazards are limited to a few kilometres from the summit, while lahars and pyroclastic flows can reach towns, Laguna Arabilla, farms, regional watersheds and wetlands, the Pisiga-Colchane border crossing and a regional road up to 10 kilometres (6.2 mi) from the volcano. Volcanic ash fallout could affect more distant cities like Antofagasta, Arica, Calama and Iquique. Initial hazard management discussion took place after an increase in activity during April 2002, and some seismometers were installed by OVDAS in 2012 to monitor an increase of earthquake activity.

== See also ==
- List of volcanoes in Chile
