= Bullockia =

Bullockia is the generic name of two groups of organisms. It can refer to:

- Bullockia (fish), a genus of fish in the family Trichomycteridae
- Bullockia (plant), a genus of plants in the family Rubiaceae
