= Panther tree iguana =

Panther tree iguana is a common name for two species of iguana:

- Liolaemus islugensis
- Liolaemus pantherinus
