= Enquelga =

Town in Chile

- Town
- Enquelga
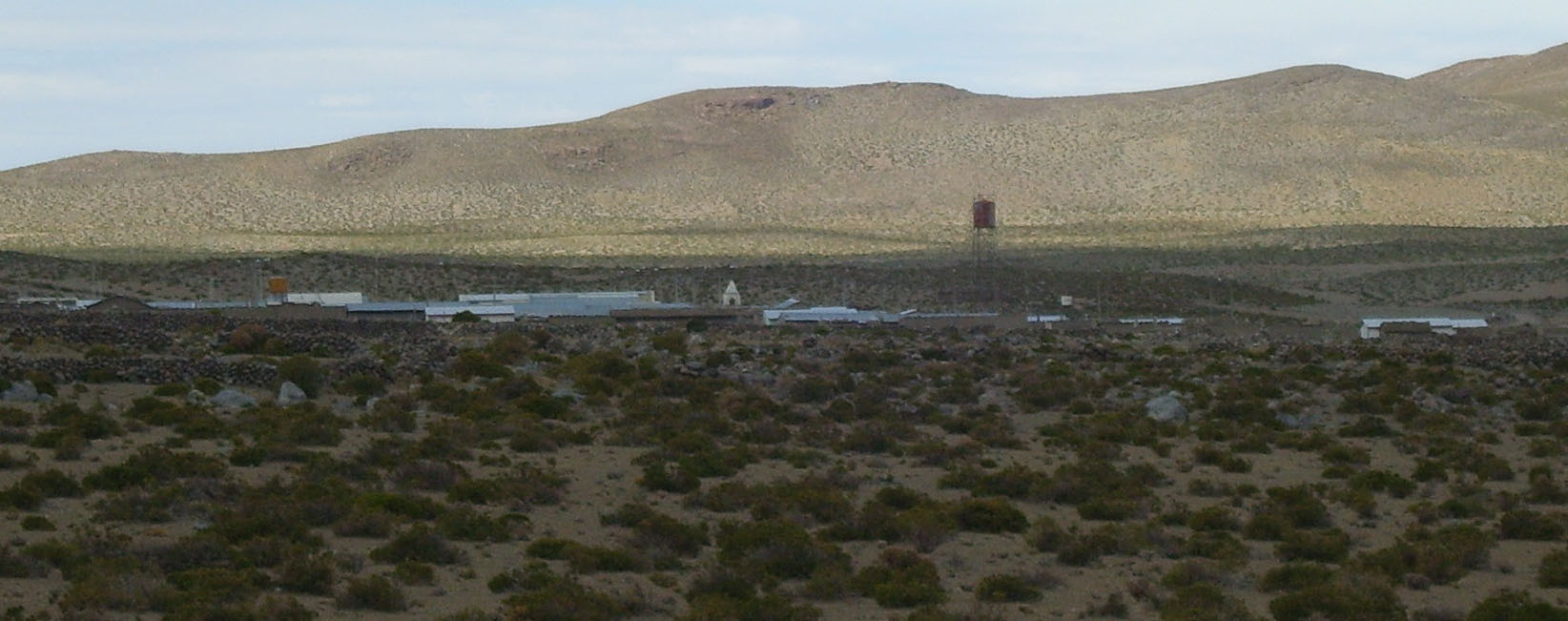

- Coat of arms
- Interactive map of Enquelga
- Coordinates: 19°13′44″S 68°48′15″W
- Country: Chile
- Region: Tarapacá Region
- Province: El Tamarugal

Enquelga (in Aymara: place of ashes) is a Chilean town. It is a highland Aymara town. It is located about 9 kilometres (5.6 mi) south-southeast of Isluga, in the commune of Colchane, Tarapacá Region, Chile. Two other smaller communities also belong to this town, Caraguano and Chapicollo. The town has several hot springs which connect to the Isluga River.
