= Trichomycterus chaberti =

Conservation status
- Least Concern (IUCN 3.1)

Scientific classification
- Kingdom: Animalia
- Phylum: Chordata
- Class: Actinopterygii
- Order: Siluriformes
- Family: Trichomycteridae
- Genus: Trichomycterus
- Species: T. chaberti

Binomial name
- Trichomycterus chaberti Durand, 1968

Species of fish

Trichomycterus chaberti is a species of cave-dwelling ray-finned fish belonging to the family Trichomycteridae, the pencil and parasitic catfishes. This catfish is endemic to Bolivia, where it is known only from the Umajalanta Cave in Torotoro National Park in Potosí Department from an altitude of 2,700 m (8,900 ft). This species grows to a length of 11.4 centimetres (4.5 in).
