= Puchuldiza =

Geothermal field in the Tarapacá Region of Chile

- Geothermal field
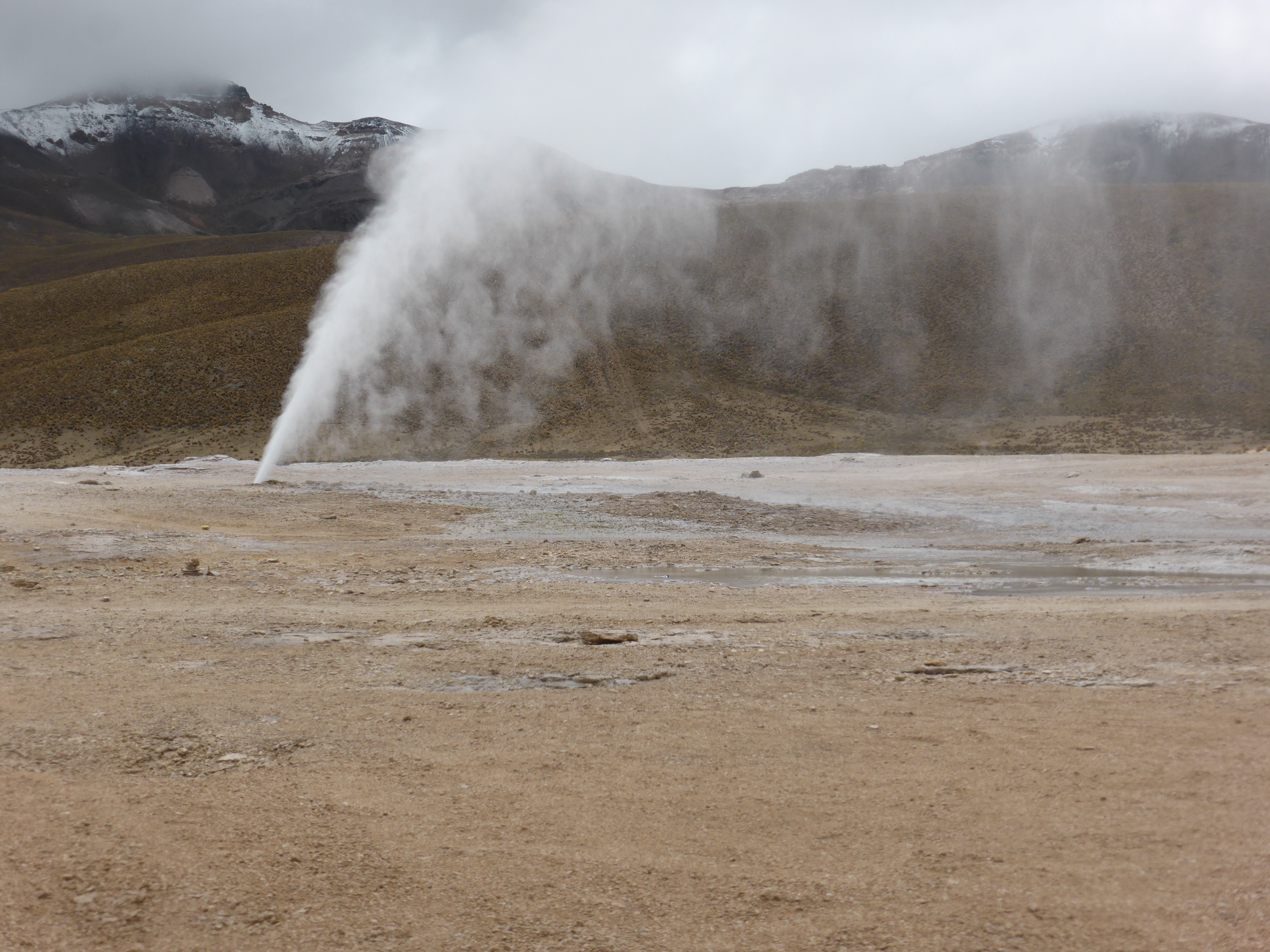
- A geyser. Puchuldiza, Tarapacá Region.

- Location within Chile
- Coordinates: 19°25′S 69°00′W
- Location: Tarapacá Region, Chile
- Part of: Central Volcanic Zone of the Andes

Area
  - Total: 1 square kilometre (250 acres)
- Elevation: 4,200 m (13,800 ft)

Puchuldiza is a geothermal field in the Tarapacá Region of Chile. It is part of the Central Volcanic Zone of the Andes, close to the active volcano Isluga and several older volcanoes in the neighbourhood; the most recent activity from one of the neighbouring volcanoes was 900,000 ± 300,000 years ago. Geothermal features include geysers and hot springs. Puchuldiza has been inspected for the possibility that it may be suitable as a source for geothermal energy.

== Context ==
On the western margin of South America, the Peru-Chile Trench separates the South America Plate from the plates of the Pacific Ocean and marks the site where these plates subduct beneath South America. The subduction of the Nazca Plate beneath the South America Plate causes the volcanic phenomena of the Central Volcanic Zone as well as geothermal phenomena in northern Chile such as at El Tatio, Puchuldiza and Surire.

The region contains ignimbrites and other volcanic rocks that were erupted during the Miocene to Pleistocene overlying earlier sediments and volcanites; these deposits appear to contain the hydrothermal systems. Geothermal phenomena are widespread and occur in the form of fumaroles, geysers, hot springs and mud pools.

== The field ==
Puchuldiza is in the Tarapacá Region of Chile at an elevation of 4,200 metres (13,800 ft)-4,300 metres (14,100 ft) above sea level in a wide valley, and is subdivided into the 1 square kilometre (0.39 sq mi) Puchuldiza proper and the 0.15 square kilometres (0.058 sq mi) Tuja field 6 kilometres (3.7 mi) farther northwest. The field is characterized by hot springs and fumaroles, which release hot fluids on the banks of the Puchuldiza River; in total there are over a hundred separate manifestations. Temperatures reach 40–84 °C (104–183 °F). Other minor geothermal manifestations and one hydrothermally altered area also occur.

A weather station is located at Puchuldiza. The towns of Los Baños de Puchuldiza and Tuja lie in the area, and the active volcano Isluga 27 kilometres (17 mi) northeast of Puchuldiza. Iquique is located 150 kilometres (93 mi) southwest from the field and the international road between Iquique in Chile and Oruro in Bolivia passes close to the field, which is thus easily accessible.

=== Geology ===
It lies within a tectonic graben that was formed by Quaternary fault activity. This fault activity has pulled the crust apart, forming depressions which are known as grabens and which collect geothermal waters. Further, the vents occur on the intersections between the faults. A number of ignimbrites crop out in the region and were deformed after emplacement, forming folds. In addition, Pliocene-Pleistocene stratovolcanoes are found at Puchuldiza, including Cerro Natividad, Cerro Condoriri, Guaillane and Latarani-Macurquima. One lava dome of Latarani was active 900,000 ± 300,000 years ago and may thus be linked to the ongoing geothermal activity, and seismic activity in the area may be related either to local faults or to the geothermal field.

=== Spring deposits and fumarole gases ===
Temperatures documented in the field exceed 200–205 °C (392–401 °F), although the temperatures of the reservoirs were estimated to be about 136–176 °C (277–349 °F). Total heatflow was estimated to be about 33 megawatt. The water is rich in salts, most importantly sodium chloride. These waters appear to originate in a deep aquifer within andesite rocks, and is mostly of meteoric origin. The Tuja field may be directly fed by geothermal energy, and the Puchuldiza indirectly by steam. Hydrothermal alteration is widespread in the rocks of the field and has generated deposits of pyrite and sinter, the latter up to 25 metres (82 ft) thick and forming bot digit-like and node-like shapes. Opal and halite deposits form in discharge channels. Landforms at Pioneer Mound close to Home Plate on the planet Mars have been compared to the landforms of Puchuldiza.

Along with water, the geothermal springs release various gases. Their dominant component is carbon dioxide; secondary components are hydrogen, hydrogen sulfide, methane and nitrogen. The presence of argon and oxygen in the gases is due to the influence of atmospheric gases in the formation of the gases. Arsenic, a toxic element, occurs in the sinter precipitates of Puchuldiza and in the spring waters, with concentrations exceeding 10 milligrams per litre (3.6×10^{−7} lb/cu in). Boron, which is toxic to plants, is also found.

== Energy production ==
Northern Chile has been investigated for its potential to generate geothermal energy, partly because there are few other energy sources in this region. Initial interest in the Puchuldiza area arose in 1920 and 1925, when the government in Iquique received requests to authorize the exploitation of its resources.

Puchuldiza and other regions in northern Chile were prospected in 1965 and 1967. Exploratory drilling occurred on two fields in northern Chile, El Tatio and Puchuldiza. Between 1974 and 1980, drilling in six exploratory wells 1,150 metres (3,770 ft) deep revealed a potential for power generation of 120–180 megawatt or 30-190 megawatt at Puchuldiza. In 1978, an experimental geothermal power plant yielded an output of 10 kilowatt; this was the first electricity generated by geothermal energy in South America. However, in 1982 it was found that the flow rates at Puchuldiza were not sufficient to justify a geothermal project. Interest in geothermal power development resurged beginning in 2000, and between 2006 and 2008 two companies obtained concessions to exploit geothermal power at Puchuldiza but as of 2016 there was no known progress on exploitation in the area. The production of boric acid from the hydrothermal brines has also been investigated.

== Other uses ==
The Baños de Puchuldiza are an important tourist attraction. Fountaining water coming from an abandoned well freezes during cold weather, forming conspicuous ice formations. Inhabitants in the area raised concerns that mines were overusing the water that feeds the geysers, damaging them in the process.
