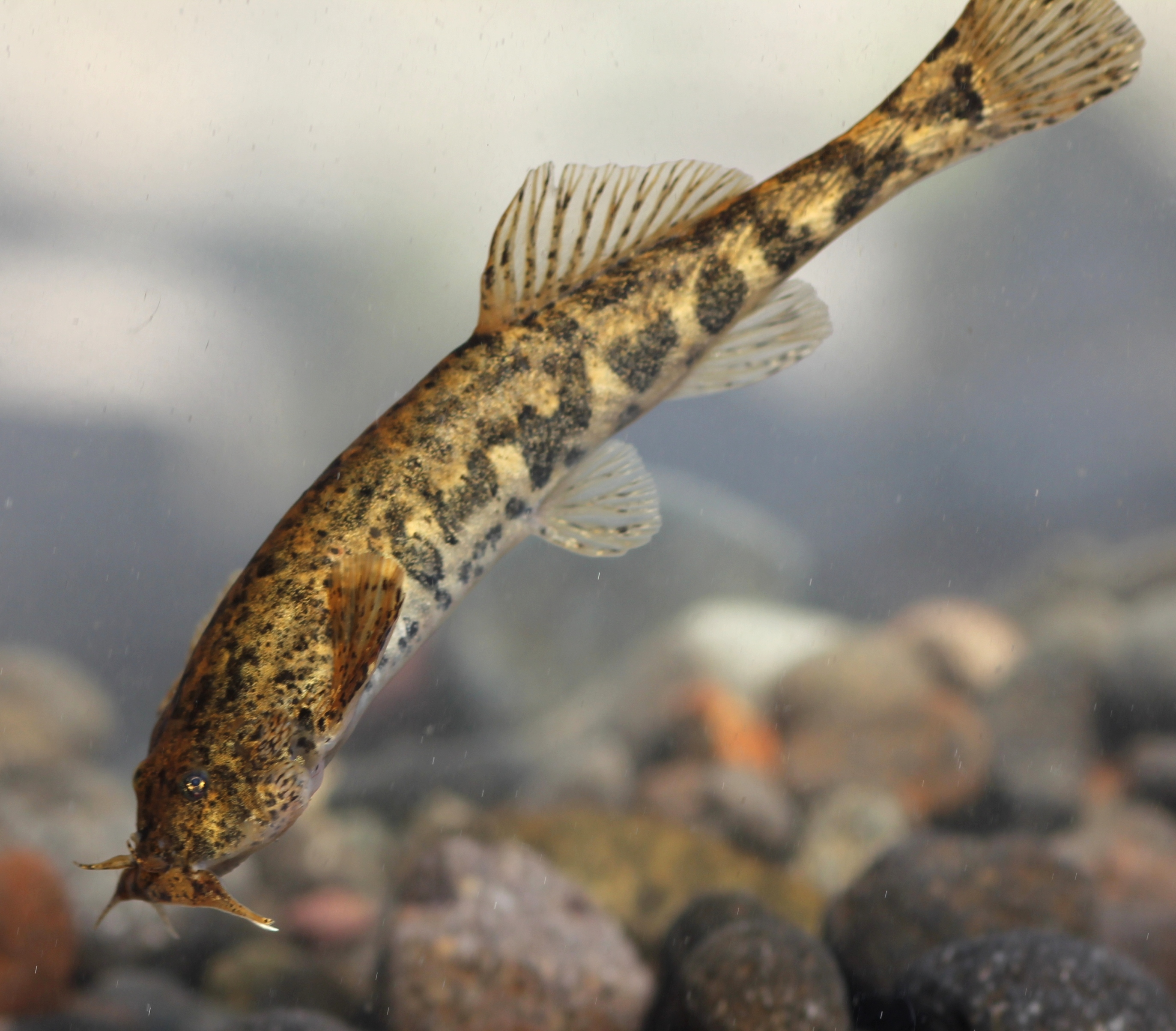

Conservation status
- Endangered (IUCN 3.1)

Scientific classification
- Kingdom: Animalia
- Phylum: Chordata
- Class: Actinopterygii
- Order: Siluriformes
- Family: Trichomycteridae
- Subfamily: Trichomycterinae
- Genus: Bullockia; Arratia, Chang, Menu-Marque & Rojas, 1978
- Species: B. maldonadoi

Binomial name
- Bullockia maldonadoi (C. H. Eigenmann, 1928)

Synonyms
- Hatcheria maldonadoi C. H. Eigenmann, 1928; Hatcheria bullocki Fowler, 1940

= Bullockia maldonadoi =

Species of fish

Bullockia maldonadoi is a species of freshwater ray-finned fish belonging to the family Trichomycteridae, the pencil and parasitic catfishes. It is the only species in the monospecific genus Bullockia. This catfish is endemic to Chile where it is distributed from the Maule River to the Imperial River. This fish grows to about 7 centimetres (2.8 in). A recently discovered species of Trichomycterus, known as astromycterus, was said to share potential characteristics with Bullockia, but they were not noted in detail.
