= Trichomycterus trefauti =

Conservation status
- Data Deficient (IUCN 3.1)

Scientific classification
- Kingdom: Animalia
- Phylum: Chordata
- Class: Actinopterygii
- Order: Siluriformes
- Family: Trichomycteridae
- Genus: Trichomycterus
- Species: T. trefauti

Binomial name
- Trichomycterus trefauti Wosiacki, 2004

Species of fish

Trichomycterus trefauti is a species of freshwater ray-finned fish belonging to the family Trichomycteridae, the pencil and parasitic catfishes. This catfish is presently only known from the upper basin of the São Francisco River in Minas Gerais state, Brazil.

This is a small, cylindrical catfish (35–55 mm standard length) which can most readily be distinguished from its congeners by its uniformly grey colouring, marked only by a distinctive elliptical dark spot at the base of the caudal fin. Other notable features include widely spaced eyes, very long barbels, the extension of the first ray of the pectoral fin into a long filament and pelvic fins which completely cover the anus and urogenital openings.
