= Trichomycterus spectrum =

Conservation status
- Least Concern (IUCN 3.1)

Scientific classification
- Kingdom: Animalia
- Phylum: Chordata
- Class: Actinopterygii
- Order: Siluriformes
- Family: Trichomycteridae
- Genus: Trichomycterus
- Species: T. spectrum

Binomial name
- Trichomycterus spectrum DoNascimiento & Prada-Pedreros, 2020

Species of fish

Trichomycterus spectrum is a species of freshwater ray-finned fish belonging to the family Trichomycteridae, the pencil and parasitic catfishes. This catfish was discovered in Alejo cave, Río Ranchería basin, Guajira, Colombia in 2020.

== Description ==
The fish was the first cavefish species discovered in the region. The fish is described as being well adapted to life underground and displays clear troglomorphism.

It grows to a maximum length of 13.19 centimetres (5.19 in) standard length.

=== Etymology ===
The colourful sounding specific name spectrum does not allude to a spectrum at all. Instead it relates to its spectral-like appearance and its dark cave habitat.
