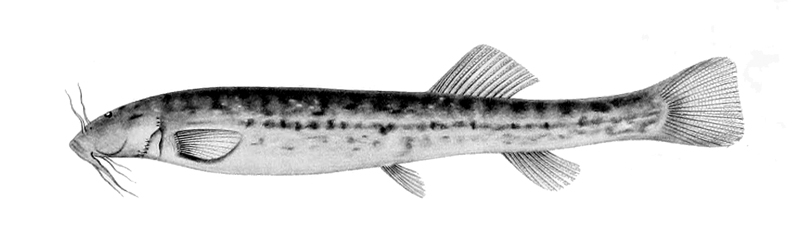

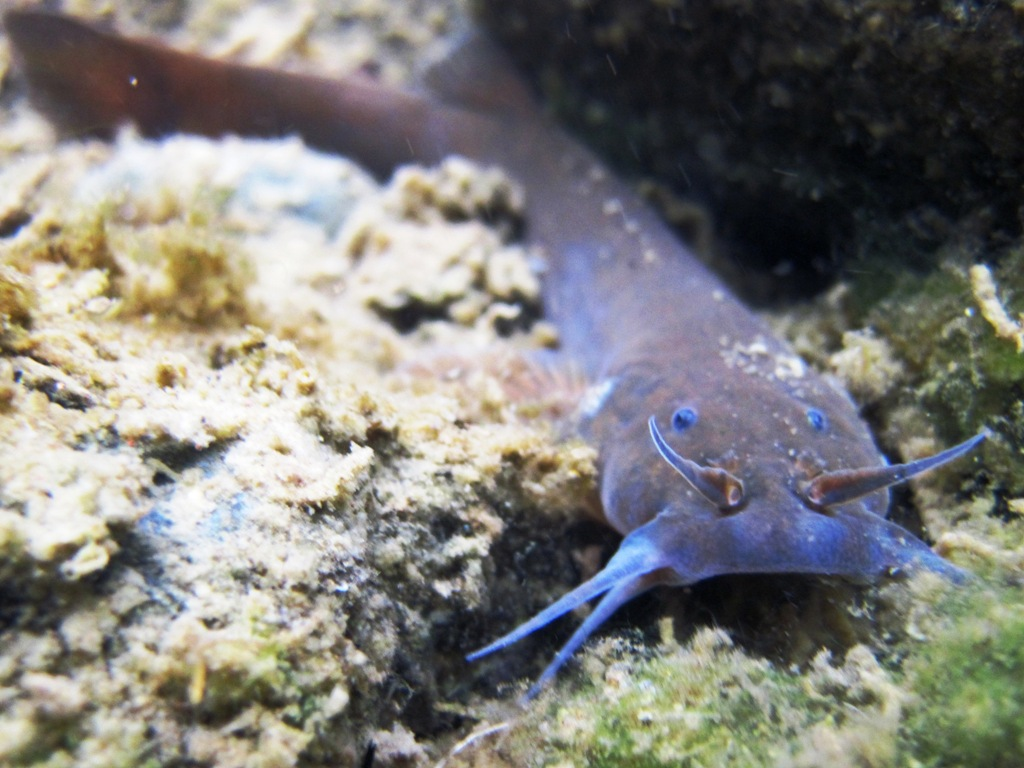

Conservation status
- Data Deficient (IUCN 3.1)

Scientific classification
- Kingdom: Animalia
- Phylum: Chordata
- Class: Actinopterygii
- Order: Siluriformes
- Family: Trichomycteridae
- Genus: Trichomycterus
- Species: T. areolatus

Binomial name
- Trichomycterus areolatus Valenciennes, 1846

Synonyms
- Harcheria areolata (Valenciennes, 1846); Trichomycterus maculatus Valenciennes, 1846; Trichomycterus marmoratus Philippi, 1866; Trichomycterus pallens Philippi, 1866; Trichomycterus tigrinus Philippi, 1866

= Trichomycterus areolatus =

Species of fish

Trichomycterus areolatus is a species of freshwater ray-finned fish belonging to the family Trichomycteridae, the pencil and parasitic catfishes. This catfish is endemic to Chile. This species grows to a length of 11.6 centimetres (4.6 in) TL.

== Sources ==
- Froese, Rainer; Pauly, Daniel (eds.). "Trichomycterus areolatus". FishBase. February 2012 version.
