= Trichomycterus aguarague =

Conservation status
- Least Concern (IUCN 3.1)

Scientific classification
- Kingdom: Animalia
- Phylum: Chordata
- Class: Actinopterygii
- Order: Siluriformes
- Family: Trichomycteridae
- Genus: Trichomycterus
- Species: T. aguarague

Binomial name
- Trichomycterus aguarague Fernández & Osinaga, 2006

Species of fish

Trichomycterus aguarague is a species of freshwater ray-finned fish belonging to the family Trichomycteridae, the pencil and parasitic catfishes. This catfish is endemic to Bolivia, where it occurs in the Paraná river system in Aguaragüe National Park. This species reaches a maximum length of 44.5 millimetres (1.75 in) SL.
