= Trichomycterus punctulatus =

Conservation status
- Least Concern (IUCN 3.1)

Scientific classification
- Kingdom: Animalia
- Phylum: Chordata
- Class: Actinopterygii
- Order: Siluriformes
- Family: Trichomycteridae
- Genus: Trichomycterus
- Species: T. punctulatus

Binomial name
- Trichomycterus punctulatus Valenciennes, 1846

Species of fish

Trichomycterus punctulatus is a species of freshwater ray-finned fish belonging to the family Trichomycteridae, the pencil and parasitic catfishes. This catfish is found in western Peru. This elongated catfish can reach a length of 19.5 cm (7.7 in).

== Range, habitat and behavior ==
This nocturnal freshwater fish is endemic to western Peru, ranging at least from Lambayeque and Cajamarca to Tacna. It mostly lives in rivers and streams, but can also be found in habitats such as small lakes and paddy fields. It is an opportunistic predator that mainly feeds on insects, but also will take small crustaceans and plant material (algae and remains of phanerogams).

== Importance to humans ==
It is fished and plays an important role in the local cuisine in northern Peru, where this species is known as life, pronounced "lee-fey", or life monsefuano (dishes: panquitas de life or sudado de life). Although it can be difficult to ascertain the exact species depicted in the artwork of the ancient Moche culture, it was likely T. punctulatus that was important in their mythology where perhaps recognized as a connection between light and darkness. In excavations of Huaca de la Luna, more than one-quarter of all fish bones were this species, revealing that it already played an important role as a food to the Moche.
