= Trichomycterus maracaiboensis =

Conservation status
- Least Concern (IUCN 3.1)

Scientific classification
- Kingdom: Animalia
- Phylum: Chordata
- Class: Actinopterygii
- Order: Siluriformes
- Family: Trichomycteridae
- Genus: Trichomycterus
- Species: T. maracaiboensis

Binomial name
- Trichomycterus maracaiboensis (L. P. Schultz, 1944)

Synonyms
- Pygidium banneaui maracaiboensis Schultz, 1944; Trichomycterus banneaui maracaiboensis (Schultz, 1944)

Species of fish

Trichomycterus maracaiboensis is a species of freshwater ray-finned fish belonging to the family Trichomycteridae, the pencil and parasitic catfishes. This catfish is endemic to Venezuela, where it occurs in the San Juan river, a tributary to the Motatán river in the Lake Maracaibo basin. This species reaches a maximum length of 4.4 centimetres (1.7 in) in the wild; in aquaria, it may grow up to 6 centimetres (2.4 in) TL.
