= Streptomyces altiplanensis =

Scientific classification
- Domain: Bacteria
- Kingdom: Bacillati
- Phylum: Actinomycetota
- Class: Actinomycetia
- Order: Streptomycetales
- Family: Streptomycetaceae
- Genus: Streptomyces
- Species: S. altiplanensis

Binomial name
- Streptomyces altiplanensis Cortés-Albayay et al. 2019

Type strain
- HST21

Species of bacterium

Streptomyces altiplanensis is an alkalitolerant bacterium species from the genus of Streptomyces which has been isolated from soil from Salar del Huasco in the Atacama Desert.

== See also ==
- List of Streptomyces species
