= Trichomycterus albinotatus =

Conservation status
- Least Concern (IUCN 3.1)

Scientific classification
- Kingdom: Animalia
- Phylum: Chordata
- Class: Actinopterygii
- Order: Siluriformes
- Family: Trichomycteridae
- Genus: Trichomycterus
- Species: T. albinotatus

Binomial name
- Trichomycterus albinotatus W. Costa, 1992

Species of fish

Trichomycterus albinotatus is a species of freshwater ray-finned fish belonging to the family Trichomycteridae, the pencil and parasitic catfishes. This catfish is endemic to Brazil, where it occurs in the Preto river, a tributary of the Paraíba do Sul river. This species reaches a maximum length of 4.6 centimetres (1.8 in).
