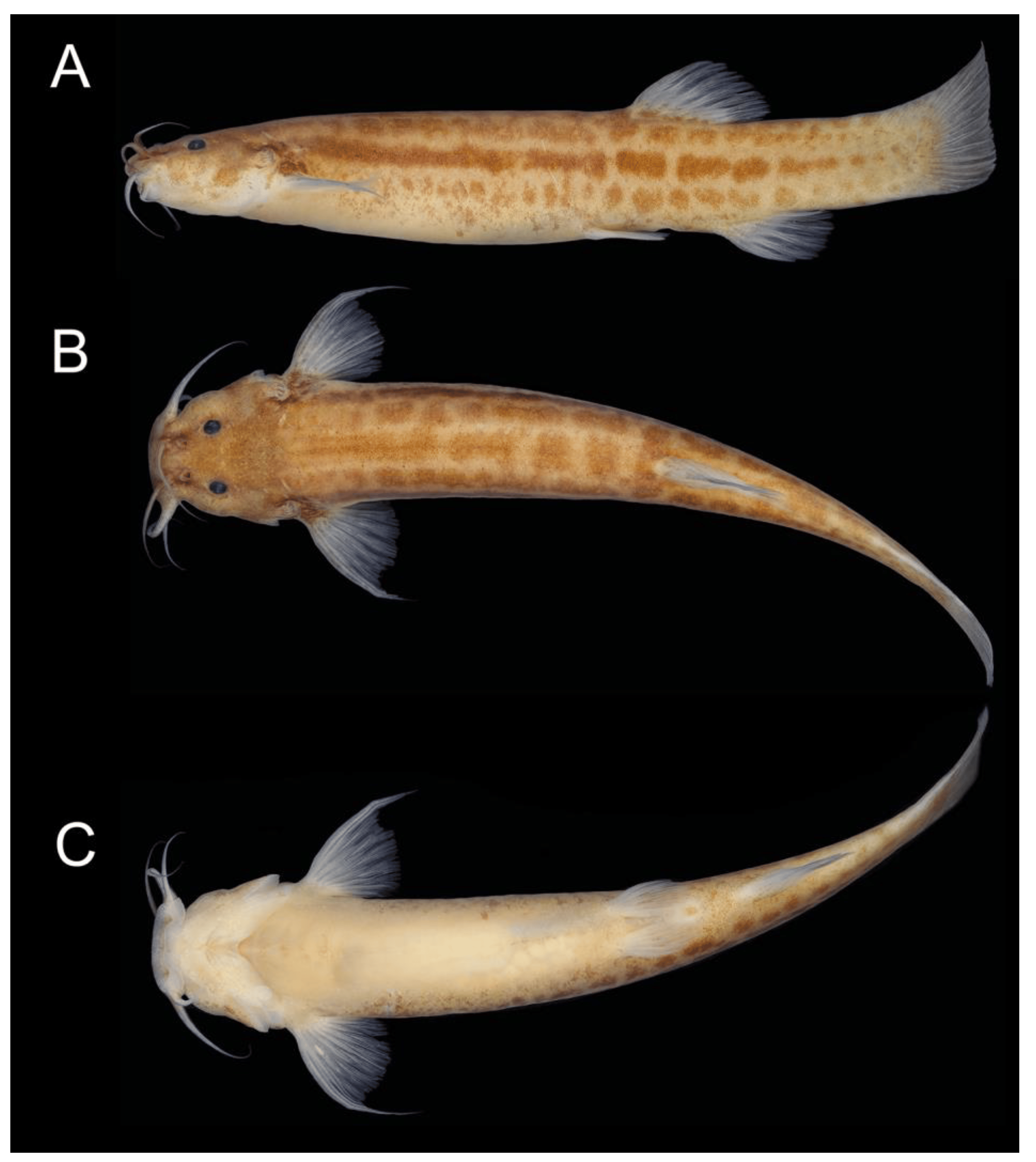

Conservation status
- Least Concern (IUCN 3.1)

Scientific classification
- Kingdom: Animalia
- Phylum: Chordata
- Class: Actinopterygii
- Order: Siluriformes
- Family: Trichomycteridae
- Genus: Trichomycterus
- Species: T. alternatus

Binomial name
- Trichomycterus alternatus (C. H. Eigenmann, 1917)

Synonyms
- Pygidium alternatum C. H. Eigenmann, 1917

= Trichomycterus alternatus =

Species of fish

Trichomycterus alternatus is a species of freshwater ray-finned fish belonging to the family Trichomycteridae, the pencil and parasitic catfishes. This catfish is endemic to Brazil, where it occurs in coastal river basins in Rio de Janeiro and Espírito Santo. This species reaches a maximum length of 8.1 centimetres (3.2 in).
