= Trichomycterus longibarbatus =

Conservation status
- Least Concern (IUCN 3.1)

Scientific classification
- Kingdom: Animalia
- Phylum: Chordata
- Class: Actinopterygii
- Division: Teleostei
- Order: Siluriformes
- Family: Trichomycteridae
- Genus: Trichomycterus
- Species: T. longibarbatus

Binomial name
- Trichomycterus longibarbatus W. Costa, 1992

Species of fish

Trichomycterus longibarbatus is a species of freshwater ray-finned fish belonging to the family Trichomycteridae, the pencil and parasitic catfishes. This catfish is endemic to Brazil, where it is only known from a very small area in Espírito Santo near Santa Teresa. This species reaches a maximum length of 5.8 centimetres (2.3 in).
