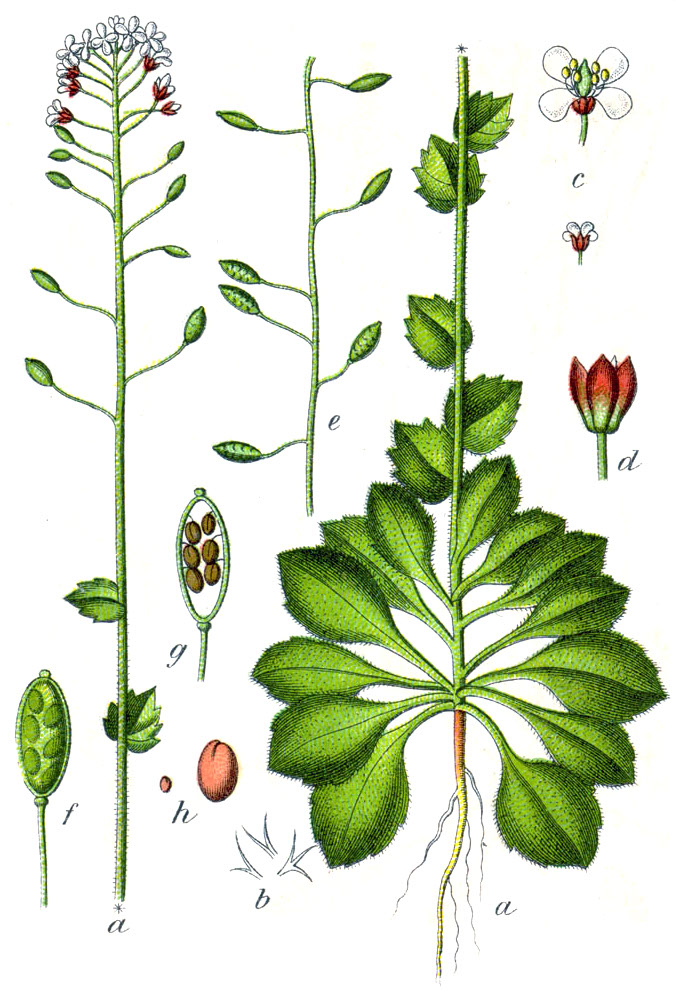
- Botanical illustration

Scientific classification
- Kingdom: Plantae
- Clade: Tracheophytes
- Clade: Angiosperms
- Clade: Eudicots
- Clade: Rosids
- Order: Brassicales
- Family: Brassicaceae
- Genus: Drabella (DC.) Fourr.
- Species: D. muralis

Binomial name
- Drabella muralis (L.) Fourr.

Synonyms
- Crucifera capselloides E.H.L.Krause; Draba muralis L. (1753) (basionym); Draba muralis f. major Bolzon; Draba muralis f. minor Bolzon; Draba nemorosa All.; Draba ramosa Gaterau; Drabella columnae Bubani

= Drabella =

Species of flowering plant

Drabella is a genus of flowering plants in the family Brassicaceae. It includes a single species, Draba muralis, an annual or biennial known as wall whitlowgrass. It is native to southern, central and northern Europe, northwestern Africa (Morocco and Algeria), Turkey, Crimea, and the Caucasus.

The species was first described as Draba muralis by Carl Linnaeus in 1753. In 1868 Jules Pierre Fourreau placed the species in the new genus Drabella.
