= Streptomyces huasconensis =

Scientific classification
- Domain: Bacteria
- Kingdom: Bacillati
- Phylum: Actinomycetota
- Class: Actinomycetia
- Order: Streptomycetales
- Family: Streptomycetaceae
- Genus: Streptomyces
- Species: S. huasconensis

Binomial name
- Streptomyces huasconensis Cortés-Albayay et al. 2019

Type strain
- HST28

Species of bacterium

Streptomyces huasconensis is a haloalkalitolerant bacterium species from the genus of Streptomyces which has been isolated from Salar del Huasco.

== See also ==
- List of Streptomyces species
