= Trichomycterus chiltoni =

Conservation status
- Endangered (IUCN 3.1)

Scientific classification
- Kingdom: Animalia
- Phylum: Chordata
- Class: Actinopterygii
- Order: Siluriformes
- Family: Trichomycteridae
- Genus: Trichomycterus
- Species: T. chiltoni

Binomial name
- Trichomycterus chiltoni (C. H. Eigenmann, 1928)

Synonyms
- Pygidium chiltoni C. H. Eigenmann, 1928

Species of fish

Trichomycterus chiltoni is a species of freshwater ray-finned fish belonging to the family Trichomycteridae, the pencil and parasitic catfishes. This catfish is endemic to Chile where it is found in the drainage system of the Biobío River. This species grows to a length of 17 centimetres (6.7 in).
