= Trichomycterus pirabitira =

Conservation status
- Least Concern (IUCN 3.1)

Scientific classification
- Kingdom: Animalia
- Phylum: Chordata
- Class: Actinopterygii
- Order: Siluriformes
- Family: Trichomycteridae
- Genus: Trichomycterus
- Species: T. pirabitira

Binomial name
- Trichomycterus pirabitira Barbosa & Azevedo-Santos, 2012

Species of fish

Trichomycterus pirabitira is a species of freshwater ray-finned fish belonging to the family Trichomycteridae, the pencil and parasitic catfishes. This catfish is found in tributaries of the upper rio Grande, rio Paraná basin, southeastern Brazil. The maximum recorded length for this species is 7.59 centimetres (2.99 in) SL.
