= Trichomycterus argos =

Conservation status
- Data Deficient (IUCN 3.1)

Scientific classification
- Kingdom: Animalia
- Phylum: Chordata
- Class: Actinopterygii
- Division: Teleostei
- Order: Siluriformes
- Family: Trichomycteridae
- Genus: Trichomycterus
- Species: T. argos

Binomial name
- Trichomycterus argos Lezama, Triques & Santos, 2012

Species of fish

Trichomycterus argos is a species of freshwater ray-finned fish belonging to the family Trichomycteridae, the pencil and parasitic catfishes. It is endemic to Brazil, where it occurs in the Doce River Basin, situated in the Serra do Brigadeiro range, Minas Gerais. This species reaches a maximum length of 11.7 centimetres (4.6 in) SL.

== Habitat and ecology ==
T. argos occurs in streams with depths varying between 13 and 44 cm (5 and 17.5 in) and water temperatures varying between 14 and 19 °C (57 and 66 °F). Under laboratory conditions, it has been observed preying on tadpoles of the Scinax catharinae species group.
