= Trichomycterus astromycterus =

Scientific classification
- Kingdom: Animalia
- Phylum: Chordata
- Class: Actinopterygii
- Order: Siluriformes
- Family: Trichomycteridae
- Genus: Trichomycterus
- Species: T. astromycterus

Binomial name
- Trichomycterus astromycterus V. Reis, de Pinna & Pessali, 2019

Species of fish

Trichomycterus astromycterus is a species of freshwater ray-finned fish belonging to the family Trichomycteridae, the pencil and parasitic catfishes. This catfish is found in Brazil.

== Description ==
The fish is distinguished based on the quantity and description of a number of features. It has thirty-three vertebrae. It was noted that it shared characteristics with the genus Bullockia, but required further study to determine how much.
