= Trichomycterus laucaensis =

Conservation status
- Near Threatened (IUCN 2.3)

Scientific classification
- Kingdom: Animalia
- Phylum: Chordata
- Class: Actinopterygii
- Order: Siluriformes
- Family: Trichomycteridae
- Genus: Trichomycterus
- Species: T. laucaensis

Binomial name
- Trichomycterus laucaensis Arratia, 1983

Species of fish

Trichomycterus laucaensis is a species of freshwater ray-finned fish belonging to the family Trichomycteridae, the pencil and parasitic catfishes. This catfish is endemic to Chile where it is found in the Lauca River basin. This species grows to a length of 14.1 centimetres (5.6 in).
