= Volcán Isluga National Park =

National park in Chile

- IUCN category II (national park)
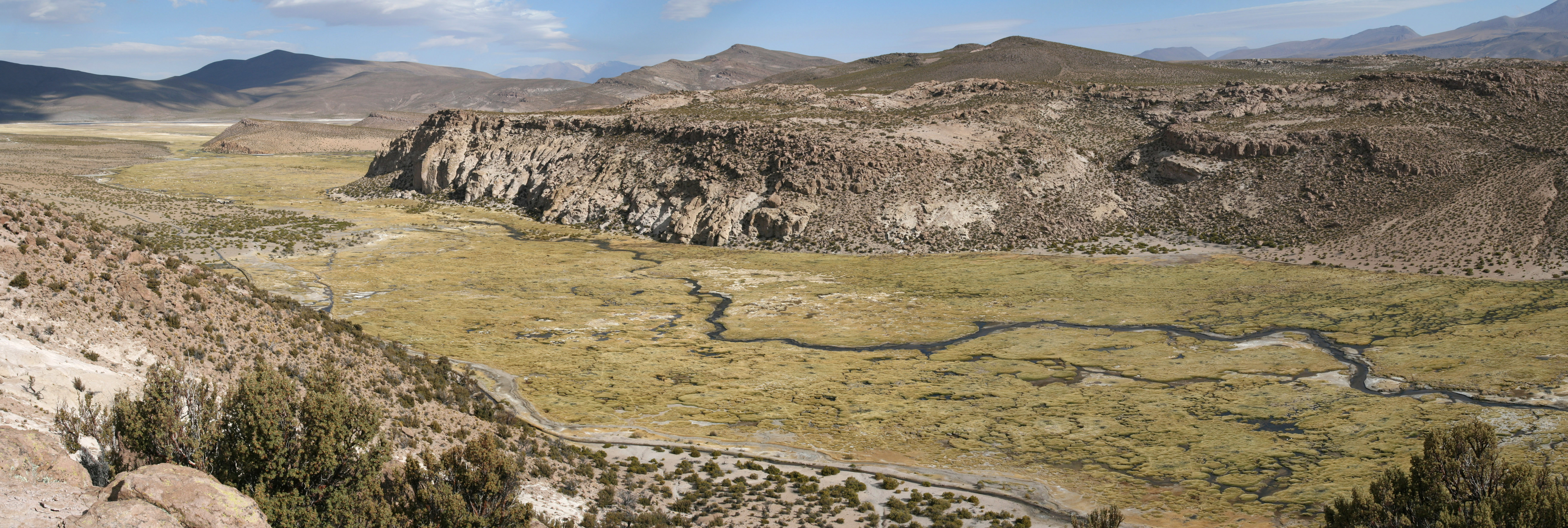
- Panorama of Volcán Isluga National Park
- Interactive map of Volcán Isluga National Park
- Location: Tarapacá Region, Chile
- Nearest city: Colchane
- Coordinates: 19°09′00″S 68°50′00″W
- Area: 1,747 km^{2} (675 sq mi)
- Established: 1967
- Governing body: Corporación Nacional Forestal

Volcán Isluga National Park (Spanish pronunciation: [isˈluɣa]) is in the Andes, in the Tarapacá Region of Chile, near Colchane and south of Lauca Biosphere Reserve. It covers 1,747 square kilometres (675 mi^{2}), with elevations ranging between 2,100 and 5,550 metres (6,890 and 18,210 ft). It is named after Volcán Isluga, which at 5,550 m, is the tallest mountain in this park.

== Peaks ==
There are numerous peaks in the national park. The most prominent include the Qinsachata Hill (5400 m), Tatajachura Hill (5252 m), the Isluga Volcano (5218 m) and the Catarama (5207 m).

== Flora ==
The park has the usual flora that grows at high altitudes. Numerous species of cacti and queñoas are native to the park.

The park includes cultural heritage of the Aymara people. There are several ceremonial towns within the park, such as Isluga.

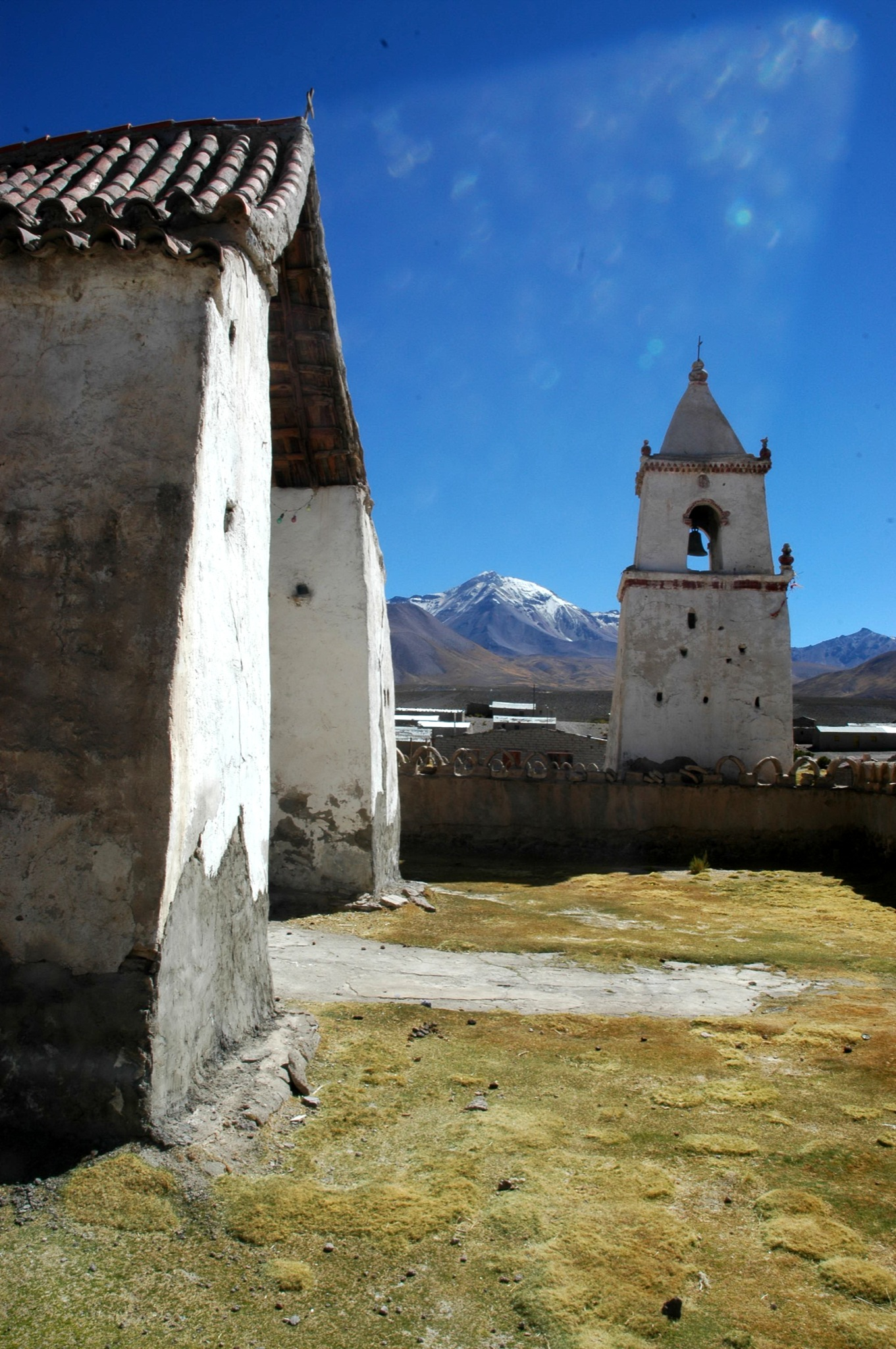
Isluga church with Cabaray volcano in the background
