= Cabaray =

Volcano in Bolivia

Cabaraya
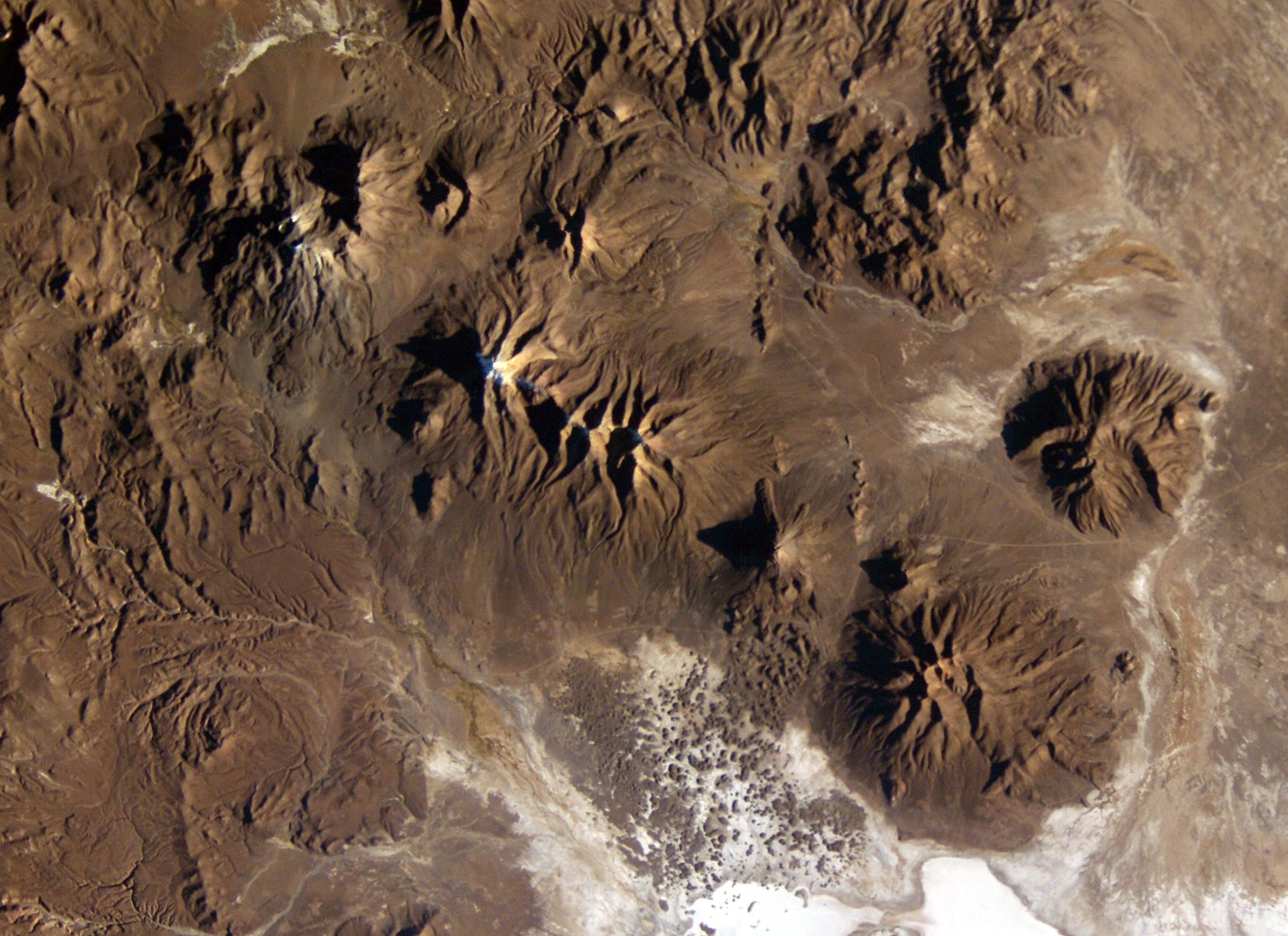
- Image from Expedition 9 shows the snow-capped peak Cabaray volcano in the Bolivian Andes (north is to the upper right).

Highest point
- Elevation: 5,869 m (19,255 ft)
- Prominence: 1,589 m (5,213 ft)
- Listing: Ultra
- Coordinates: 19°08′45″S 68°41′54″W

Geography
- Location within Bolivia
- Location: Bolivia
- Parent range: Andes

Geology
- Mountain type: Stratovolcano
- Last eruption: Unknown

Cabaraya is a stratovolcano in Bolivia. It lies between the volcanoes Isluga and Tata Sabaya, immediately east of the border with Chile.

== See also ==
- List of Ultras of South America

== Sources ==
- Siebert L, Simkin T (2002–present). Volcanoes of the World: an Illustrated Catalog of Holocene Volcanoes and their Eruptions. Smithsonian Institution, Global Volcanism Program Digital Information Series, GVP-3 (http://www.volcano.si.edu).
