= Jules Pierre Fourreau =

French botanist

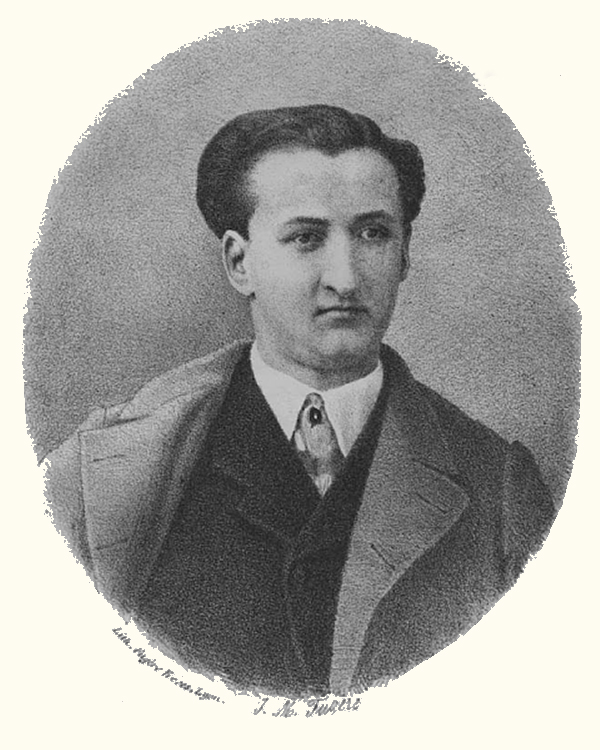
Portrait of Fourreau, 1868 or 1869

Jules Pierre Fourreau (25 August 1844, Lyon – 16 January 1871, Beaune) was a French botanist. The standard author abbreviation Fourr. is used to indicate this person as the author when citing a botanical name.

As a young man he worked as an assistant to botanist Alexis Jordan (1814-1897) in Lyon. Beginning in the mid-1860s, he began collecting plants throughout southeastern France (Ardèche, the Alps, Provence, et al.). In November 1870 he enlisted in the Légionnaires du Rhône, and on 16 January 1871 he died in a hospital in Beaune as a result of injuries received at the Bataille de Nuits (18 December 1870).

In 1864 he became a member of the Société linnéenne de Lyon. In 1867 he introduced the genus name Mistralia (family Thymelaeaceae) in honor of poet Frédéric Mistral. In 1869 he founded the Société de la Renaissance, serving as its first president.

The genus Fourraea (family Brassicaceae) is named in his honor.

== Published works ==
- "Breviarium plantarum novarum: sive specierum in horto plerumque cultura recognitarum descriptio contracta unterius amplianda"; F. Savy, 1866 (with Alexis Jordan).
- "Icones ad floram Europae novo fundamento instaurandam spectantes"; Perrin, 1866 (with Alexis Jordan).
- Catalogue des plantes qui croissent le long du cours du Rhône, F. Savy, 1868.
