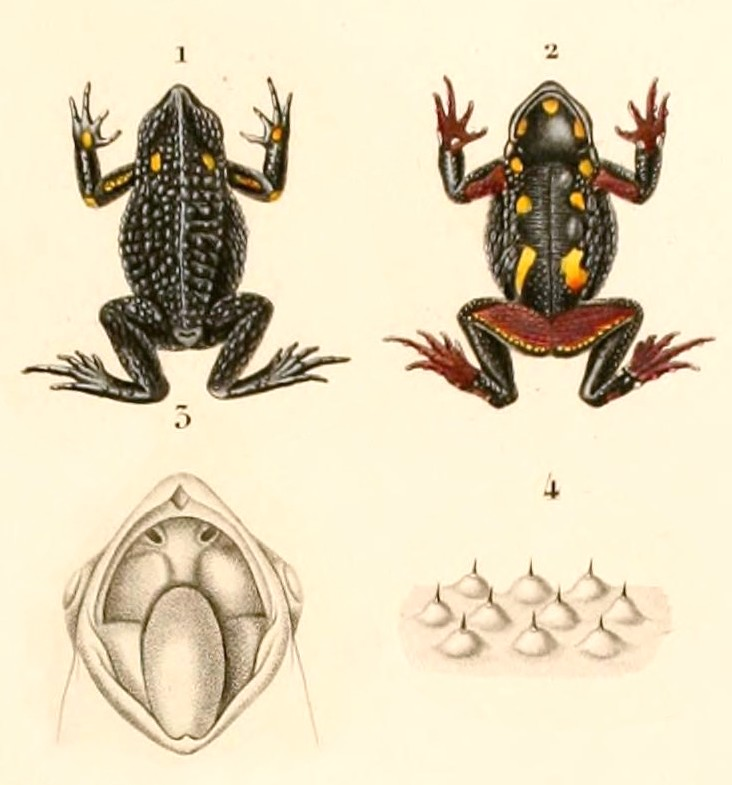

Conservation status
- Least Concern (IUCN 3.1)

Scientific classification
- Kingdom: Animalia
- Phylum: Chordata
- Class: Amphibia
- Order: Anura
- Family: Bufonidae
- Genus: Rhinella
- Species: R. spinulosa

Binomial name
- Rhinella spinulosa (Wiegmann, 1834)

Synonyms
- Bufo spinulosus Wiegmann, 1834; Chaunus spinulosus (Wiegmann, 1834); Bufo arequipensis Vellard, 1959; Bufo flavolineatus Vellard, 1959; Bufo spinulosus ssp. papillosus Gallardo, 1965; Bufo trifolium Tschudi, 1845; Bufo simus Schmidt, 1857

= Rhinella spinulosa =

Species of amphibian

Rhinella spinulosa is a species of toad in the family Bufonidae that is found in the Andean Argentina, Bolivia, Chile, and Peru.

Rhinella spinulosa has a wide altitudinal range, from the sea level to 5,100 m (16,700 ft) asl, and it occurs in a range of habitats: scrubland and grassland in the Andes, and forested areas in the more southern parts of its range; it has also been recorded from arable areas. It breeds in temporary ponds, altiplano lagoons, and slow flowing streams. Where it occurs it tends to be abundant.
