= Liolaemus islugensis =

Conservation status
- Least Concern (IUCN 3.1)

Scientific classification
- Kingdom: Animalia
- Phylum: Chordata
- Class: Reptilia
- Order: Squamata
- Suborder: Iguania
- Family: Liolaemidae
- Genus: Liolaemus
- Species: L. islugensis

Binomial name
- Liolaemus islugensis Ortiz & Marquet, 1987

Species of lizard

Liolaemus islugensis, the panther tree iguana, is a species of lizard in the family Iguanidae. It is found in Chile and Bolivia.
