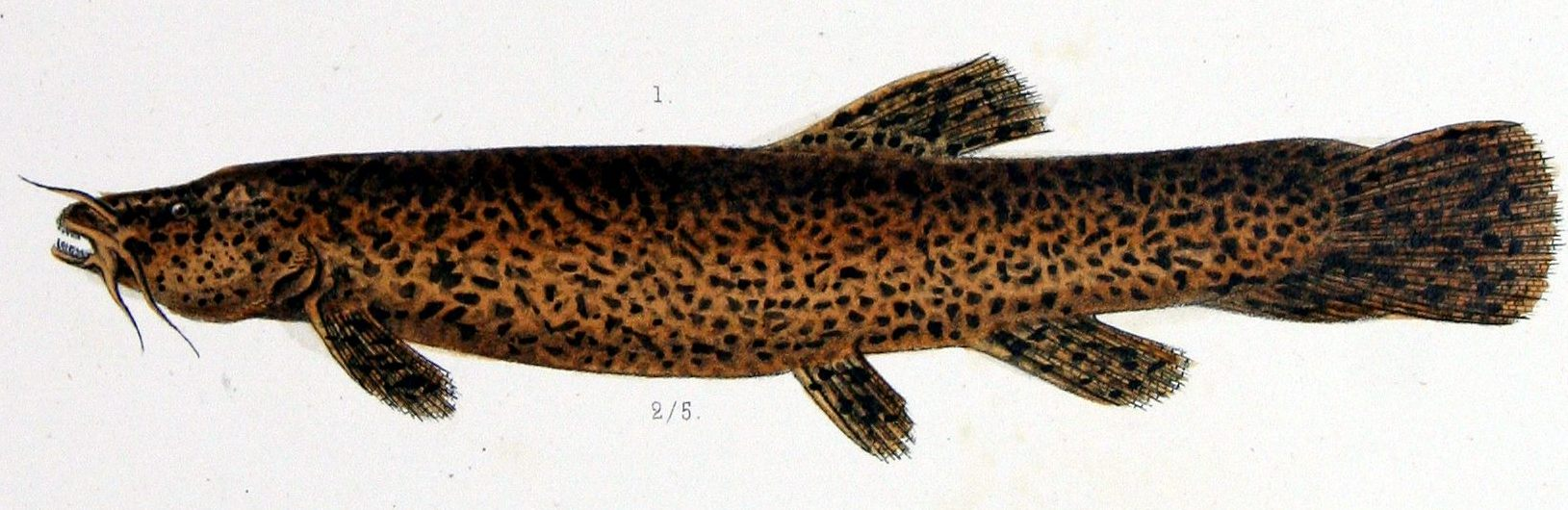

Conservation status
- Least Concern (IUCN 3.1)

Scientific classification
- Kingdom: Animalia
- Phylum: Chordata
- Class: Actinopterygii
- Order: Siluriformes
- Family: Trichomycteridae
- Genus: Trichomycterus
- Species: T. rivulatus

Binomial name
- Trichomycterus rivulatus Valenciennes, 1846

= Trichomycterus rivulatus =

Species of fish

Trichomycterus rivulatus is a species of freshwater ray-finned fish belonging to the family Trichomycteridae, the pencil and parasitic catfishes. This catfish is found in high-altitude Andean streams and lakes (including Junin, Poopó and Titicaca) in southern Peru, western Bolivia and northern Chile. It is the largest species in the genus Trichomycterus and grows to a maximum length of 37.4 centimetres (14.7 in) TL. The species is regularly caught as a food fish. However, because of pollution, studies have revealed levels of metals in T. rivulatus of Lake Titicaca that exceed the internationally recommended safety thresholds for human consumption.
