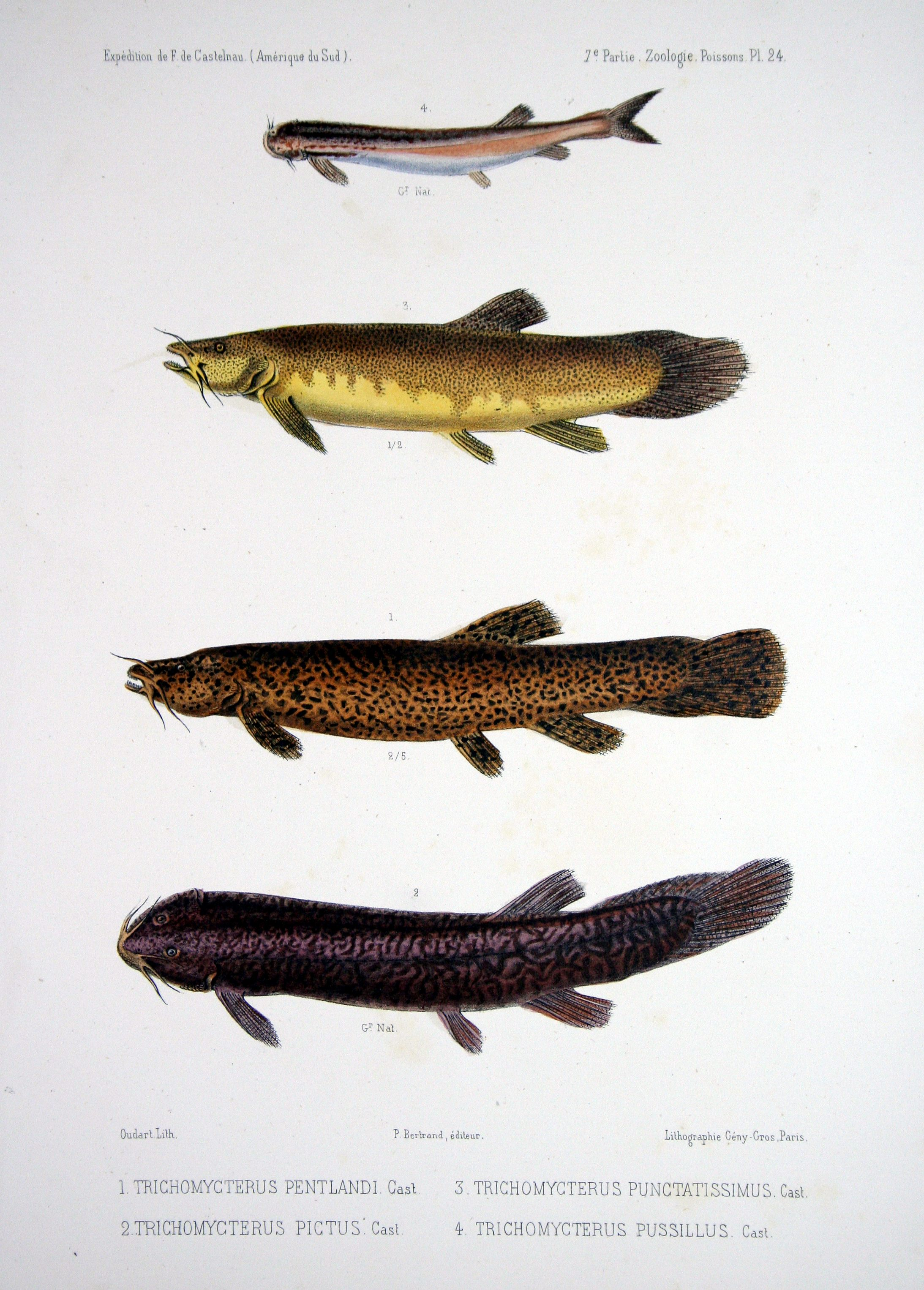
- 1856 illustration from Castelnau's description: 2nd from top is Trichomycterus punctatissimus, bottom two are Trichomycterus rivulatus

Scientific classification
- Kingdom: Animalia
- Phylum: Chordata
- Class: Actinopterygii
- Order: Siluriformes
- Family: Trichomycteridae
- Subfamily: Trichomycterinae
- Genus: Trichomycterus; Valenciennes, 1832

Type species
- Trichomycterus nigricans Valenciennes, 1832

Synonyms
- Cryptocambeva W. Costa, 2021; Humboldtglanis W. Costa, 2021; Megacambeva W. Costa, 2021; Paracambeva W. Costa, 2021; Psammocambeva W. Costa, 2021

= Trichomycterus =

Genus of fishes

Trichomycterus is a genus of freshwater ray-finned fish belonging to the family Trichomycteridae, the pencil and parasitic catfishes. This is the largest genus of its family with over 200 species currently described. This genus is native to freshwater habitats in Central and South America. These fish are generally small, usually about 5 to 15 cm (2–6 in) in standard length, although the largest, T. rivulatus, can reach more than twice this size. Species differ from one another primarily in body proportions, fin ray counts and colouration. Despite their relatively small size, some, such as T. punctulatus, support fisheries and are important in the local cuisine.

== Taxonomy ==
This genus is defined by the lack of specializations found in other trichomycterids and is certainly polyphyletic. Although known to contain many species, Trichomycterus is poorly known with many of the known species based on brief descriptions. Many species have been described recently and many more are waiting to be described.

Some authors have tentatively defined putative monophyletic assemblages within the genus Trichomycterus based on the possession of unique morphological features. The Trichomycterus brasiliensis species-complex includes T. brasiliensis, T. iheringi, T. maracaya, T. mimonha, T. pirabitira, T. potschi, T. vermiculatus and several undescribed species apparently endemic to the main river basins draining the Brazilian Shield. However, an assemblage of species from south and southeastern Brazil is also supported that includes T. araxa, T. castroi, T. davisi, T. guaraquessaba, T. immaculatus, T. itatiayae, T. mboycy, T. mirissumba, T. naipi, T. nigricans, T. papilliferus, T. plumbeus, T. stawiarski, T. taroba, T. triguttatus and T. zonatus, T. aguarague, T. alterus, T. belensis, T. boylei and T. ramosus also form a diagnosable species assemblage.

== Distribution and habitat ==
Species of Trichomycterus inhabit a diversity of habitats throughout South and Central America from Costa Rica in the north to Patagonia in the south and from lowland Atlantic rainforest in the east to Andean highland streams in the west. They are, together with Astroblepus and Orestias, among the very few native fish genera at high altitude in the Andes and in some places, for example certain high-elevation localities in western Argentina, Trichomycterus are the only fishes. About 60 nominal species are endemic to the river basins draining the Andes and hills of the Guianan Shield and about 30 species are endemic to river basins draining the Brazilian Shield.

Despite the broad distribution of the genus, most species have limited distributions and usually are restricted to only one river. Wide-ranging species are most likely complexes of species that are difficult to differentiate, such as the T. brasiliensis species-complex. Trichomycterus gorgona, from a small stream on Gorgona Island located west of the Pacific coast of Colombia, is the first known trichomycterid to be endemic to an offshore island. Many species are troglobitic.

== Species ==
Trichomycterus contains the following valid species:

- Trichomycterus adautoleitei W. Costa, Azevedo-Santos & Katz, 2023
- Trichomycterus aguarague Fernández & Osinaga, 2006
- Trichomycterus albinotatus W. Costa, 1992
- Trichomycterus alternatus (C. H. Eigenmann, 1917)
- Trichomycterus alterus (Marini, Nichols & LaMonte, 1933)
- Trichomycterus altipombensis W. Costa, Katz, Vilardo & Mattos, 2022
- Trichomycterus anaisae Katz & W. Costa, 2021
- Trichomycterus antiquus W. Costa, Feltrin, Mattos & Katz, 2024
- Trichomycterus araxa W. Costa, Mattos, Sampaio, Giongo, Almeida & Katz 2022
- Trichomycterus ardilai Ardila Rodríguez, 2023
- Trichomycterus areolatus Valenciennes, 1846
- Trichomycterus argos Lezama, Triques & Santos, 2012
- Trichomycterus arhuaco Ardila Rodríguez, 2016
- Trichomycterus ariasi Ardila Rodríguez, 2025
- Trichomycterus arleoi (Fernández-Yépez, 1972)
- Trichomycterus asocolcibios Ardila Rodríguez, 2025
- Trichomycterus astromycterus V. Reis, de Pinna & Pessali, 2019
- Trichomycterus atochae (Allen, 1942)
- Trichomycterus auroguttatus W. Costa, 1992
- Trichomycterus bahianus W. Costa 1992
- Trichomycterus ballesterosi Ardila Rodríguez, 2011
- Trichomycterus banneaui (C. H. Eigenmann, 1912)
- Trichomycterus barbouri (C. H. Eigenmann, 1911)
- Trichomycterus barrocus V. Reis & de Pinna 2022
- Trichomycterus belensis Fernández & Vari 2002
- Trichomycterus berthalutzae W. Costa, Barbosa & Katz, 2024
- Trichomycterus bogotensis (C. H. Eigenmann, 1912)
- Trichomycterus bomboizanus (Tortonese, 1942)
- Trichomycterus borellii Boulenger, 1897
- Trichomycterus boylei (Nichols, 1956)
- Trichomycterus brasiliensis Lütken, 1874
- Trichomycterus brigadeirensis Costa, Katz & Vilardo, 2023
- Trichomycterus brucutu V. Reis & de Pinna, 2022
- Trichomycterus brunoi Barbosa & W. Costa, 2010
- Trichomycterus cachiraensis Ardila Rodríguez, 2008
- Trichomycterus caipora Lima, Lazzarotto & W. Costa, 2008
- Trichomycterus calai Ardila Rodríguez, 2019
- Trichomycterus caliensis (C. H. Eigenmann, 1912)
- Trichomycterus candidus (A. Miranda-Ribeiro, 1949)
- Trichomycterus caparaoensis W. Costa, Barbosa & Katz, 2023
- Trichomycterus caratinguensis W. Costa, Katz & Vilardo, 2023
- Trichomycterus caribensis Ardila Rodríguez, 2024
- Trichomycterus casitaensis Ardila Rodríguez, 2017
- Trichomycterus castelensis W. Costa, Katz & Vilardo, 2023
- Trichomycterus catamarcensis Fernández & Vari, 2000
- Trichomycterus caudofasciatus Alencar & W. Costa 2004
- Trichomycterus celsae Lasso & Provenzano, 2003
- Trichomycterus cepitaensis Ardila Rodríguez, 2025
- Trichomycterus cerritoensis Ardila Rodríguez, 2018
- Trichomycterus chaberti Durand, 1968
- Trichomycterus chapmani (C. H. Eigenmann, 1912)
- Trichomycterus chiltoni (C. H. Eigenmann, 1920)
- Trichomycterus choroloensis Ardila Rodríguez, 2024
- Trichomycterus chungaraensis Arratia, 1983
- Trichomycterus claudiae Barbosa & W. Costa, 2010
- Trichomycterus coelhorum W. Costa, Azevedo-Santos & Katz, 2023
- Trichomycterus conradi (C. H. Eigenmann, 1912)
- Trichomycterus corduvensis Weyenbergh, 1877
- Trichomycterus curitiensis Ardila Rodríguez, 2024
- Trichomycterus dali Rizzato, W. Costa, Trajano & Bichuette, 2011
- Trichomycterus diamantinensis W. Costa, Feltrin, Mattos & Katz, 2024
- Trichomycterus dispar (Tschudi, 1846)
- Trichomycterus donascimientoi Castellanos-Morales, 2018
- Trichomycterus dorsostriatus (C. H. Eigenmann, 1917)
- Trichomycterus duellmani Arratia & Menu-Marque, 1984
- Trichomycterus emanueli (Schultz, 1944)
- Trichomycterus espinhacensis W. Costa & Katz, 2023
- Trichomycterus fabioheppi Costa, Barbosa & Katz, 2024
- Trichomycterus fassli (Steindachner, 1915)
- Trichomycterus ferreri Ardila Rodríguez, 2018
- Trichomycterus florensis (A. Miranda Ribeiro, 1943)
- Trichomycterus fuliginosus Barbosa & W. Costa, 2010
- Trichomycterus funebris Katz & W. Costa, 2021
- Trichomycterus gabrieli (Myers, 1926)
- Trichomycterus gairaensis Ardila Rodríguez, 2018
- Trichomycterus galvisi Ardila Rodríguez, 2024
- Trichomycterus gambitaensis Ardila Rodríguez, 2023
- Trichomycterus garbei W. Costa, Azevedo-Santos & Katz, 2023
- Trichomycterus garciamarquezi Ardila Rodríguez, 2016
- Trichomycterus gasparinii Barbosa, 2013
- Trichomycterus giarettai Barbosa & Katz, 2016
- Trichomycterus giganteus S. Lima & W. Costa, 2004
- Trichomycterus goeldii Boulenger, 1896
- Trichomycterus gorgona Fernández & Schaefer, 2005
- Trichomycterus guianensis (C. H. Eigenmann, 1909)
- Trichomycterus hatoensis Ardila Rodríguez, 2025
- Trichomycterus heterodontus (C. H. Eigenmann, 1917)
- Trichomycterus hualco Fernández & Vari, 2009
- Trichomycterus humboldti W. Costa & Katz, 2021
- Trichomycterus illuvies V. Reis & de Pinna, 2022
- Trichomycterus immaculatus (C. H. Eigenmann & R. S. Eigenmann, 1889)
- Trichomycterus ingaiensis Katz & W. Costa, 2021
- Trichomycterus ipatinga V. Reis & de Pinna, 2022
- Trichomycterus itacambirussu Triques & Vono, 2004
- Trichomycterus itacarambiensis Trajano & de Pinna, 1996
- Trichomycterus itatiayae A. Miranda Ribeiro, 1906
- Trichomycterus jacupiranga Wosiacki & Oyakawa, 2005
- Trichomycterus jequitinhonhae Triques & Vono, 2004
- Trichomycterus kankuamo Ardila Rodríguez, 2016
- Trichomycterus knerii Steindachner, 1882
- Trichomycterus landinga Triques & Vono, 2004
- Trichomycterus largoperculatus W. Costa & Katz, 2022
- Trichomycterus latidens (C. H. Eigenmann, 1917)
- Trichomycterus latistriatus (C. H. Eigenmann, 1917)
- Trichomycterus laucaensis Arratia, 1983
- Trichomycterus lauryi Donin, Ferrer & Carvalho, 2020
- Trichomycterus lauzannii Miranda & Fernández, 2020
- Trichomycterus lewi Lasso & Provenzano, 2003
- Trichomycterus listruroides W. Costa, Katz & Azevedo-Santos, 2023
- Trichomycterus longibarbatus W. Costa, 1992
- Trichomycterus luetkeni Katz & W. Costa, 2021
- Trichomycterus macareguaensis Ardila Rodríguez, 2024
- Trichomycterus macrophthalmus Barbosa & W. Costa, 2012
- Trichomycterus macrotrichopterus Barbosa & W. Costa, 2010
- Trichomycterus maculosus Barbosa & W. Costa, 2010
- Trichomycterus maldonadoi Ardila Rodríguez, 2011
- Trichomycterus manaurensis Ardila Rodríguez, 2016
- Trichomycterus maracaiboensis (Schultz, 1944)
- Trichomycterus maracaya Bockmann & Sazima, 2004
- Trichomycterus mariamole Barbosa & W. Costa, 2010
- Trichomycterus megantoni Fernández & Quispe Chuquihuamaní, 2007
- Trichomycterus melanopygius V. Reis, Santos, Britto, Volpi & de Pinna, 2020
- Trichomycterus meridae Regan, 1903
- Trichomycterus migrans (Dahl, 1960)
- Trichomycterus mimonha W. Costa, 1992
- Trichomycterus mimosensis Barbosa, 2013
- Trichomycterus minus Fernández & Vari, 2012
- Trichomycterus mirissumba W. Costa, 1992
- Trichomycterus mogotensis Ardila Rodríguez, 2017
- Trichomycterus mondolfi (Schultz, 1945)
- Trichomycterus montesi Ardila Rodríguez, 2016
- Trichomycterus motatanensis (Schultz, 1944)
- Trichomycterus mutabilicolor W. Costa, 2022
- Trichomycterus nabusimakensis Ardila Rodríguez, 2018
- Trichomycterus nietoi Ardila Rodríguez, 2014
- Trichomycterus nigricans Valenciennes, 1832
- Trichomycterus nigroauratus Barbosa & W. Costa, 2008
- Trichomycterus nigromaculatus Boulenger, 1887
- Trichomycterus novalimensis Barbosa & W. Costa, 2010
- Trichomycterus ocanaensis Ardila Rodríguez, 2011
- Trichomycterus oroyae (C. H. Eigenmann & R. S. Eigenmann, 1889)
- Trichomycterus pantherinus Alencar & W. Costa, 2004
- Trichomycterus paquequerensis (P. Miranda Ribeiro, 1943)
- Trichomycterus pauciradiatus Alencar & W. Costa, 2006
- Trichomycterus pirabitira Barbosa & Azevedo-Santos, 2012
- Trichomycterus piratymbara Katz, Barbosa & W. Costa, 2013
- Trichomycterus piurae (C. H. Eigenmann, 1922)
- Trichomycterus potschi Barbosa & W. Costa, 2003
- Trichomycterus pradensis Sarmento-Soares, Martins-Pinheiro, Aranda & Chamon, 2005
- Trichomycterus pseudosilvinichthys Fernández & Vari, 2004
- Trichomycterus puna Fernández, Contrera & Bize, 2023
- Trichomycterus punctatissimus Castelnau, 1855
- Trichomycterus punctulatus Valenciennes, 1846
- Trichomycterus puriventris Barbosa & W. Costa, 2012
- Trichomycterus quechuorum (Steindachner, 1900)
- Trichomycterus quintus W. Costa, 2020
- Trichomycterus ramosus Fernández, 2000
- Trichomycterus regani (C. H. Eigenmann, 1917)
- Trichomycterus reinhardti (C. H. Eigenmann, 1917)
- Trichomycterus retropinnis Regan, 1903
- Trichomycterus riojanus (Berg, 1897)
- Trichomycterus riosae Ardila Rodríguez, 2025
- Trichomycterus rivulatus Valenciennes, 1846
- Trichomycterus roigi Arratia & Menu-Marque, 1984
- Trichomycterus romeroi (Fowler, 1941)
- Trichomycterus rosablanca Mesa S., Lasso, Ochoa & DoNascimiento, 2018
- Trichomycterus rubbioli Bichuette & Rizzato, 2012
- Trichomycterus rubiginosus Barbosa & W. Costa, 2010
- Trichomycterus ruficaudatus Costa, Mattos, Amorim, Gago & Katz, 2025
- Trichomycterus ruitoquensis Ardila Rodríguez, 2007
- Trichomycterus sainthilairei Katz & W. Costa, 2021
- Trichomycterus sanchezi Ardila Rodríguez, 2024
- Trichomycterus sandovali Ardila Rodríguez, 2006
- Trichomycterus santaeritae (C. H. Eigenmann, 1918)
- Trichomycterus santanderensis Castellanos-Morales, 2007
- Trichomycterus santuarioensis Ardila Rodríguez, 2024
- Trichomycterus saquarema W. Costa, Katz, Vilardo & Amorim, 2022
- Trichomycterus saturatus W. Costa, Katz & Azevedo-Santos, 2023
- Trichomycterus septemradiatus Katz, Barbosa & W. Costa, 2013
- Trichomycterus simacotaensis Ardila Rodríguez, 2024
- Trichomycterus sketi Castellanos-Morales, 2011
- Trichomycterus spectrum DoNascimiento & Prada-Pedreros, 2020
- Trichomycterus spegazzinii (Berg, 1897)
- Trichomycterus spelaeus DoNascimiento, Villarreal & Provenzano, 2001
- Trichomycterus spilosoma (Regan, 1913)
- Trichomycterus steindachneri DoNascimiento, Prada-Pedreros & Guerrero-Kommritz, 2014
- Trichomycterus stellatus (C. H. Eigenmann, 1918)
- Trichomycterus straminius (C. H. Eigenmann, 1917)
- Trichomycterus striatus (Meek & Hildebrand, 1913)
- Trichomycterus sucrensis Ardila Rodríguez, 2018
- Trichomycterus taczanowskii Steindachner, 1882
- Trichomycterus taenia Kner, 1863
- Trichomycterus taeniops Fowler, 1954
- Trichomycterus tantalus S. Reis, Vieira & de Pinna, 2022
- Trichomycterus tenuis Weyenbergh, 1877
- Trichomycterus tete Barbosa & W. Costa, 2011
- Trichomycterus tetuanensis García-Melo, Villa-Navarro & DoNascimiento, 2016
- Trichomycterus therma Fernández & Miranda, 2007
- Trichomycterus tiraquae (Fowler, 1940)
- Trichomycterus tomarrazonensis Ardila Rodríguez, 2025
- Trichomycterus torcoromaensis Ardila Rodríguez, 2016
- Trichomycterus transandianus (Steindachner, 1915)
- Trichomycterus travassosi (P. Miranda Ribeiro, 1949)
- Trichomycterus trefauti Wosiacki, 2004
- Trichomycterus uberabensis W. Costa, Azevedo-Santos & Katz, 2023
- Trichomycterus uisae Castellanos-Morales, 2008
- Trichomycterus unicolor (Regan, 1913)
- Trichomycterus urbanoi Ardila Rodríguez, 2025
- Trichomycterus valenciae Ardila Rodríguez, 2025
- Trichomycterus valleduparensis Ardila Rodríguez, 2018
- Trichomycterus varii Fernández & Andreoli Bize, 2018
- Trichomycterus vermiculatus (C. H. Eigenmann, 1917)
- Trichomycterus vinnulus S. Reis & de Pinna, 2022
- Trichomycterus vitalbrazili Vilardo, Katz & W. Costa, 2020
- Trichomycterus vittatus Regan, 1903
- Trichomycterus weyrauchi (Fowler, 1945)
- Trichomycterus wiwa Ardila Rodríguez, 2018
- Trichomycterus yuska Fernández & Schaefer, 2003
- Trichomycterus zapatocaensis Ardila Rodríguez, 2023
