= Telmatobius peruvianus =

Conservation status
- Vulnerable (IUCN 3.1)

Scientific classification
- Kingdom: Animalia
- Phylum: Chordata
- Class: Amphibia
- Order: Anura
- Family: Telmatobiidae
- Genus: Telmatobius
- Species: T. peruvianus

Binomial name
- Telmatobius peruvianus Wiegmann, 1834

Species of amphibian

Telmatobius peruvianus, also known as the Peru water frog, is a species of frog in the family Telmatobiidae. This semiaquatic frog is endemic to Andean highlands in southeastern Peru and far northern Chile.

== Habitat ==
This frog is found in streams and rivers in the Andean highlands, where it has been observed between 1980 and 4300 meters above sea level.

The frog's known range overlaps one protected park in it, Vilacota Maure Regional Conservation Area, but scientists have not confirmed that the frog lives there.

== Reproduction ==
This frog reproduces year-round. The tadpoles swim in the deepest parts of the streams.

== Threats ==
This frog is classified as vulnerable to extinction. Principal threats include habitat loss associated with mining and agriculture, pollution, and collection for human consumption medicine. Scientists believe the fungal disease chytridiomycosis might kill this frog because it has killed so many of its congeners, but they have yet to observe the causitive fungus Batrachochytrium dendrobatidis on T. peruvianus specimens.
