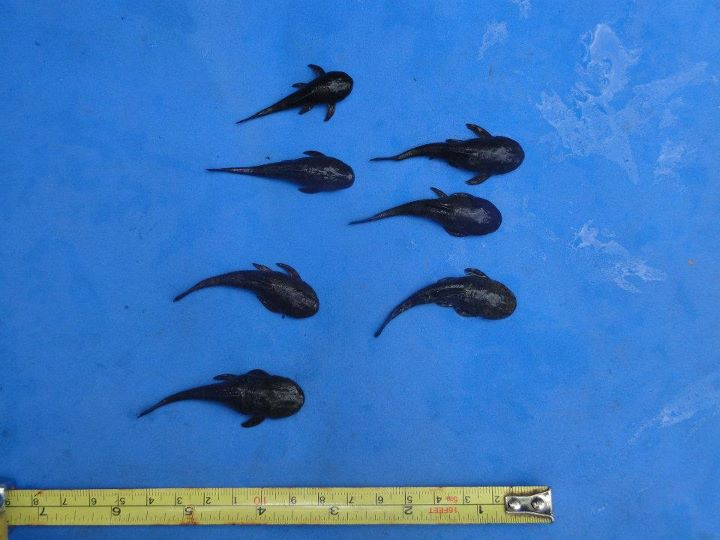

Conservation status
- Near Threatened (IUCN 3.1)

Scientific classification
- Kingdom: Animalia
- Phylum: Chordata
- Class: Actinopterygii
- Order: Siluriformes
- Family: Loricariidae
- Subfamily: Rhinelepinae
- Genus: Rhinelepis
- Species: R. aspera

Binomial name
- Rhinelepis aspera Spix & Agassiz, 1829

= Rhinelepis aspera =

Species of fish

Rhinelepis aspera is a species of freshwater ray-finned fish belonging to the family Loricariidae, the armored catfishes, and the subfamily Rhinelepinae, the rhinelepine plecos. This catfish occurs in South America, where it occurs in the São Francisco and upper Paraná River basins of Brazil and Paraguay. This species grows to a total length of 49 cm (19 in).
