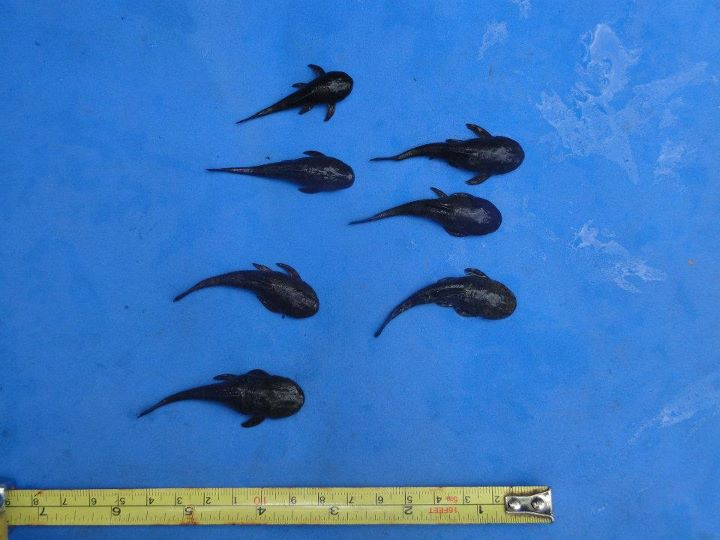
- Rhinelepis aspera

Scientific classification
- Kingdom: Animalia
- Phylum: Chordata
- Class: Actinopterygii
- Order: Siluriformes
- Family: Loricariidae
- Subfamily: Rhinelepinae
- Genus: Rhinelepis; Agassiz, 1829

Type species
- Rhinelepis aspera Spix & Agassiz, 1829

= Rhinelepis =

Genus of fishes

Rhinelepis is a genus of freshwater ray-finned fishes belonging to the family Loricariidae, the armored catfishes, and the subfamily Rhinelepinae, the rhinelepine plecos. The fishes in this genus are found in South America.

== Taxonomy ==
Rhinelepis was first proposed as a genus in 1829 by the Swiss-American naturalist Louis Agassiz with Rhinelepis aspera as its type species by monotypy, a species first described by Johann Baptist von Spix and Agassiz in 1829 with its type locality given as Rio São Francisco, at Januária, 15°29’37”S, 44°21’25”W, Minas Gerais. This is the type genus of the subfamily Rhinelepinae, which is in the family Loricariidae, in the suborder Loricarioidei of the order Siluriformes, the catfishes.

== Species ==
Rhinelepis contains the following species:

- Rhinelepis aspera Spix & Agassiz, 1829
- Rhinelepis strigosa Valenciennes, 1840

== Appearance and anatomy ==
Rhinelepis species are large and heavily plated, though the plates on the abdomen (belly) develop later than in Pseudorinelepis. They are generally charcoal gray without any markings. The head is long and fat. The fins are short and the adipose fin is entirely absent. The gill opening is much larger than that of most loricariids. The cheeks lack elongate odontodes.

== Distribution ==
Rhinelepis catfishes are found in South America in the basins of the São Francisco, Paraná and Uruguay river basins in Argentina, Brazil, Paraguay and Uruguay.
