= Pogonopoma =

Scientific classification
- Kingdom: Animalia
- Phylum: Chordata
- Class: Actinopterygii
- Order: Siluriformes
- Family: Loricariidae
- Subfamily: Rhinelepinae
- Genus: Pogonopoma; Regan, 1904

Type species
- Plecostomus wertheimeri Steindachner, 1867

Synonyms
- Pogonopomoides Gosline, 1947

Genus of fishes

Pogonopoma is a genus of freshwater ray-finned fishes belonging to the family Loricariidae, the armored catfishes, and the subfamily Rhinelepinae, the rhinelepine plecos. The fishes in this genus are found in rivers in south and southeast Brazil.

== Taxonomy ==
Pogonopoma is one of three genera currently valid in the subfamily Rhinelepinae. Pogonopomoides, previously a valid genus, was placed in synonymy with Pogonopoma. This genus and Rhinelepis have a sister group relationship. The subfamily Rhinelepinae is classified in the family Loricariidae within the suborder Loricarioidei of the order Siluriformes, the catfishes.

== Species ==
Pogonopoma contains the following valid species:

- Pogonopoma obscurum Quevedo & R. E. dos Reis, 2002
- Pogonopoma parahybae (Steindachner, 1877)
- Pogonopoma wertheimeri (Steindachner, 1867)

== Appearance and anatomy ==
As loricariids, Pogonopoma species all exhibit a suckermouth and an at least slightly flattened ventral surface. However, unlike many loricariids, they have circular pupils, which differs from most members of the family that have an omega iris. Pogonopoma species are heavily armored except on their abdomen (the belly in the case of loricariids), which is relatively unplated.

P. wertheimeri is a cylindrically shaped loricariid. The cheek is covered in long, thin, non-evertible odontodes that form a dense patch.

P. parahybae appears to be more of an intermediate between P. wertheimeri and Rhinelepis. It is fairly flattened, and also has longer pectoral and pelvic fins compared to other species of the tribe Rhinelepini. The gill openings are not as large as those in Rhinelepis. Also, this species lacks long cheek odontodes and the adipose fin.

P. obscurum, unlike P. wertheimeri, simultaneously lacks an adipose fin and cheek odontodes. Its dorsal fin base is also longer than of other members of this genus.
