= Pogonopoma wertheimeri =

Conservation status
- Vulnerable (IUCN 3.1)

Scientific classification
- Kingdom: Animalia
- Phylum: Chordata
- Class: Actinopterygii
- Order: Siluriformes
- Family: Loricariidae
- Subfamily: Rhinelepinae
- Genus: Pogonopoma
- Species: P. wertheimeri

Binomial name
- Pogonopoma wertheimeri (Steindachner, 1867)

Synonyms
- Plecostomus wertheimeri Steindachner, 1867

Species of fish

Pogonopoma wertheimeri is a species of freshwater ray-finned fish belonging to the family Loricariidae, the armored catfishes, and the subfamily Rhinelepinae, the rhinelepine plecos. This catfish is endemic to Brazil, where it is found in the Mucuri River, São Mateus River, and Doce River. This species is usually found in stretches of river with medium to strong water current and a bottom formed by rocks or sand. However, they are also found in the Juparanã Lagoon, close to the mouth of the Doce River, which is a lentic habitat. This species grows to a standard length of 22.3 cm (8.8 in).
