= Cathorops manglarensis =

Scientific classification
- Domain: Eukaryota
- Kingdom: Animalia
- Phylum: Chordata
- Class: Actinopterygii
- Order: Siluriformes
- Family: Ariidae
- Genus: Cathorops
- Species: C. manglarensis

Binomial name
- Cathorops manglarensis Marceniuk, 2007

Species of fish

Cathorops manglarensis is a species of catfish in the family Ariidae. It was described by Alexandre Pires Marceniuk in 2007. It is a tropical, fresh and saltwater catfish which occurs in Colombia. It reaches a standard length of 19.5 cm (7.7 in).

The species epithet "manglarensis" refers to the preferred habitat of the species, in mangroves.
