= Cathorops belizensis =

Conservation status
- Data Deficient (IUCN 3.1)

Scientific classification
- Domain: Eukaryota
- Kingdom: Animalia
- Phylum: Chordata
- Class: Actinopterygii
- Order: Siluriformes
- Family: Ariidae
- Genus: Cathorops
- Species: C. belizensis

Binomial name
- Cathorops belizensis Marceniuk & Betancur-R., 2008
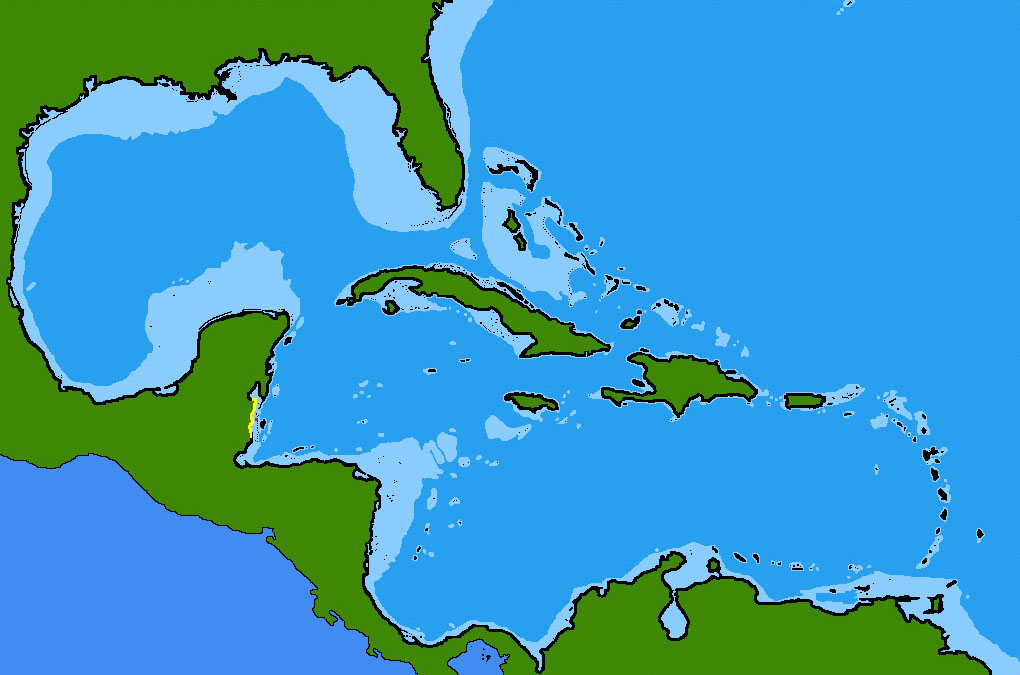

Species of fish

Cathorops belizensis, the Belize sea catfish, is a species of sea catfish. It is found in mangrove channels in Belize City. Maximum recorded body length is 32 cm.
