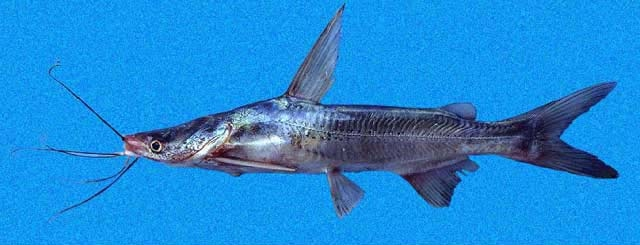
- Cathorops hypophthalmus

Scientific classification
- Kingdom: Animalia
- Phylum: Chordata
- Class: Actinopterygii
- Order: Siluriformes
- Family: Ariidae
- Subfamily: Ariinae
- Genus: Cathorops; D. S. Jordan & C. H. Gilbert, 1883

Type species
- Arius hypophthalmus (Steindachner, 1876)

= Cathorops =

Genus of fishes

Cathorops is a genus of catfishes in the family Ariidae found in the Atlantic and Pacific Oceans. These species are found in the eastern and western Central and South America in brackish and freshwater habitats. This genus is a strongly supported clade of this family. It consists of a natural group in which the monophyly is well-defined by morphological and molecular evidence and the genus probably includes several unrecognized species from both American coasts.

== Species ==
There are currently 22 recognized species in this genus:

- Cathorops agassizii (C. H. Eigenmann & R. S. Eigenmann, 1888)
- Cathorops aguadulce (Meek, 1904) (Estuarine sea catfish)
- Cathorops arenatus (Valenciennes, 1840)
- Cathorops belizensis Marceniuk & Betancur-R., 2008 (Belizean sea catfish)
- Cathorops dasycephalus (Günther, 1864) (Big-belly sea catfish)
- Cathorops festae (Boulenger, 1898)
- Cathorops fuerthii (Steindachner, 1876) (Congo sea catfish)
- Cathorops higuchii Marceniuk & Betancur-R., 2008 (Higuchi's sea catfish)
- Cathorops hypophthalmus (Steindachner, 1876) (Gloomy sea catfish)
- Cathorops kailolae Marceniuk & Betancur-R., 2008 (Kailola's sea catfish)
- Cathorops liropus (Bristol, 1897) (Conguito sea catfish)
- Cathorops manglarensis Marceniuk, 2007
- Cathorops mapale Betancur-R. & Acero P, 2005 (Mapalé sea catfish)
- Cathorops melanopus (Günther, 1864) (Dark sea catfish)
- Cathorops multiradiatus (Günther, 1864) (Box sea catfish)
- Cathorops nuchalis (Günther, 1864) (Orinoco sea catfish)
- Cathorops raredonae Marceniuk, Betancur-R. & Acero P, 2009 (Raredon's sea catfish)
- Cathorops spixii (Agassiz, 1829) (Madamango sea catfish)
- Cathorops steindachneri (C. H. Gilbert & Starks, 1904) (Steindachner's sea catfish)
- Cathorops taylori (Hildebrand, 1925) (Taylor's sea catfish)
- Cathorops tuyra (Meek & Hildebrand, 1923) (Besudo sea catfish)
- Cathorops wayuu Betancur-R., Acero P & Marceniuk, 2012 (Wayuu sea catfish)
