= Cathorops higuchii =

Conservation status
- Least Concern (IUCN 3.1)

Scientific classification
- Domain: Eukaryota
- Kingdom: Animalia
- Phylum: Chordata
- Class: Actinopterygii
- Order: Siluriformes
- Family: Ariidae
- Genus: Cathorops
- Species: C. higuchii

Binomial name
- Cathorops higuchii Marceniuk & Betancur-R., 2008
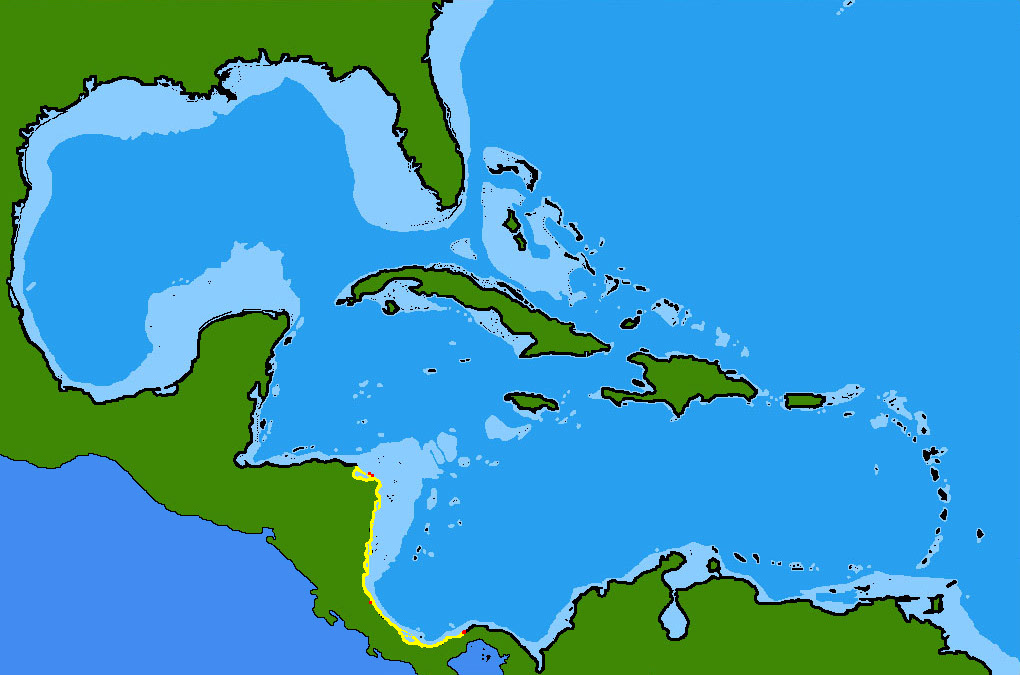

Species of fish

Cathorops higuchii, the Higuchi's sea catfish, is a species of sea catfish. It is named after Horácio Higuchi, a scientist from Museu Paraense Emílio Goeldi, Brazil. The species is found in estuaries and coastal waters of the western Atlantic from eastern Honduras to Colón, Panama. Maximum recorded body length is 35 cm.

== Etymology ==
The catfish is named in honor of Horácio Higuchi, of the Museu Paraense Emílio Goeldi in Belém, Brazil, because of his contribution to the taxonomy, systematics and morphology of South American ariids.
