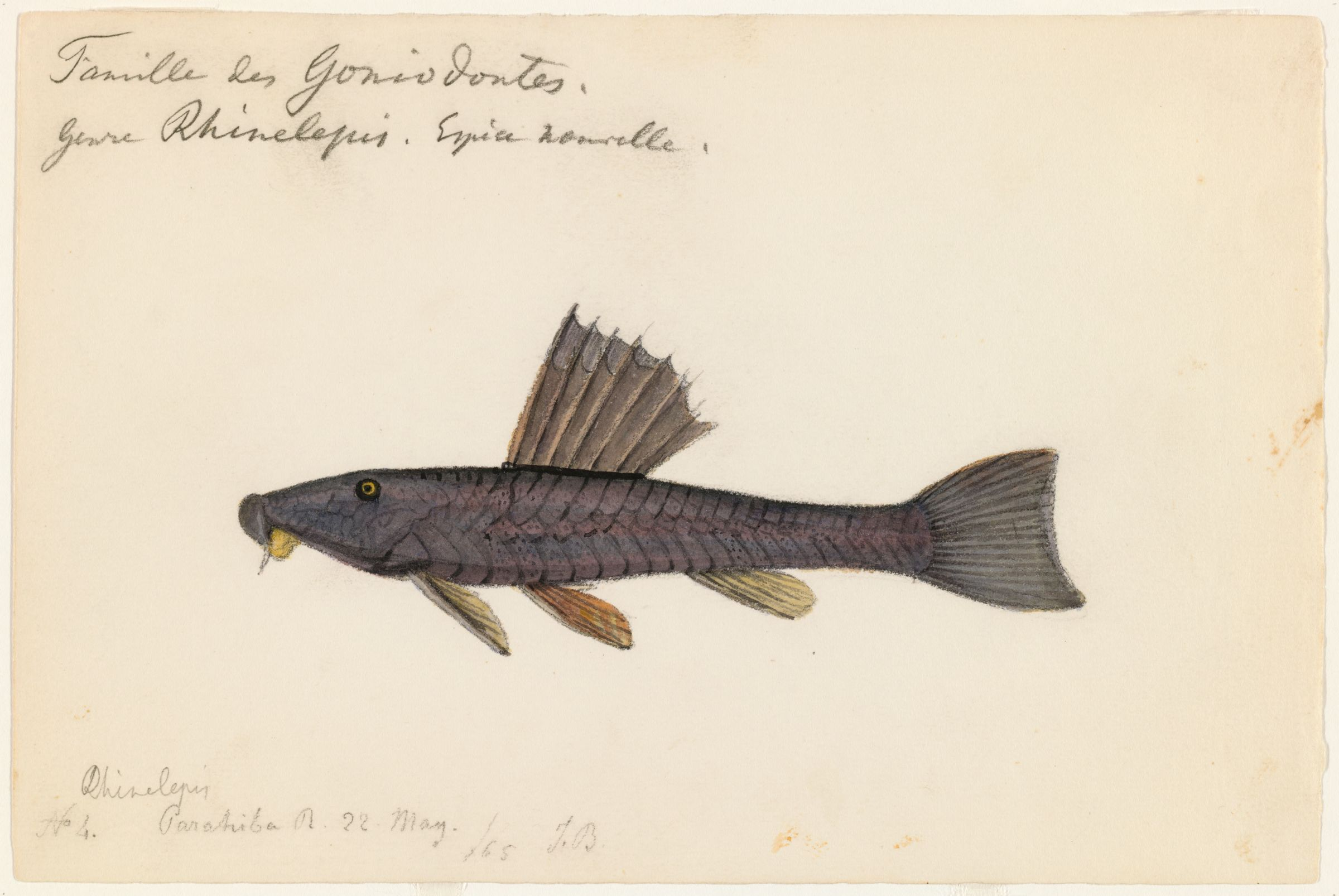

Conservation status
- Vulnerable (IUCN 3.1)

Scientific classification
- Kingdom: Animalia
- Phylum: Chordata
- Class: Actinopterygii
- Order: Siluriformes
- Family: Loricariidae
- Genus: Pogonopoma
- Species: P. parahybae

Binomial name
- Pogonopoma parahybae (Steindachner, 1877)

Synonyms
- Rhinelepis parahybae Steindachner, 1877; Pogonopomoides parahybae (Steindachner, 1877)

= Pogonopoma parahybae =

Species of fish

Pogonopoma parahybae is a species of freshwater ray-finned fish belonging to the family Loricariidae, the armored catfishes, and the subfamily Rhinelepinae, the rhinelepine plecos. This catfish is endemic to Brazil, where it is found in the Paraíba do Sul river basin, where it occurs in areas of medium to strong water current usually associated with rocky substrate. This species grows to a standard length of 26.3 cm (10.4 in).
