= Rhinelepis strigosa =

Conservation status
- Least Concern (IUCN 3.1)

Scientific classification
- Kingdom: Animalia
- Phylum: Chordata
- Class: Actinopterygii
- Order: Siluriformes
- Family: Loricariidae
- Subfamily: Rhinelepinae
- Genus: Rhinelepis
- Species: R. strigosa

Binomial name
- Rhinelepis strigosa Valenciennes, 1840

Species of fish

Rhinelepis strigosa is a species of freshwater ray-finned fish belonging to the family Loricariidae, the armored catfishes, and the subfamily Rhinelepinae, the rhinelepine plecos. This catfish occurs in South America, where it occurs in the Paraná, Paraguay, and Uruguay river basins in Argentina, Brazil, Paraguay, and Uruguay. This species grows to a total length of 48 cm (19 in).
