= Cathorops raredonae =

Scientific classification
- Domain: Eukaryota
- Kingdom: Animalia
- Phylum: Chordata
- Class: Actinopterygii
- Order: Siluriformes
- Family: Ariidae
- Genus: Cathorops
- Species: C. raredonae

Binomial name
- Cathorops raredonae Marceniuk, Betancur-R. & Acero P., 2009

Species of fish

Cathorops raredonae, the curator sea catfish or Raredon's sea catfish, is a species of catfish in the family Ariidae. It was described by Alexandre Pires Marceniuk, Ricardo Betancur-Rodríguez and Arturo Acero Pizarro in 2009. It is a tropical, marine and freshwater-dwelling fish which occurs between Mexico and El Salvador.

== Etymology ==
The fish is named in honor of Sandra J. Raredon (b. 1954), of the Division of Fishes in the National Museum of Natural History, Washington, D.C., for her valuable assistance.
