= Papillate sea catfish =

Conservation status
- Least Concern (IUCN 3.1)

Scientific classification
- Kingdom: Animalia
- Phylum: Chordata
- Class: Actinopterygii
- Order: Siluriformes
- Family: Ariidae
- Genus: Cathorops
- Species: C. kailolae

Binomial name
- Cathorops kailolae Marceniuk & Betancur-R., 2008

Species of fish

The papillate sea catfish (Cathorops kailolae), also known as the Kailola's sea catfish, is a species of sea catfish in the family Ariidae. It was described by Alexandre Pires Marceniuk and Ricardo Betancur-Rodríguez in 2008. It is a tropical fresh and saltwater catfish which occurs in Central America. It reaches a standard length of 25.4 cm (10.0 in).

The species epithet "kailolae" refers to ichthyologist Patricia J. Kailola, and is cited as being given in honour of her contributions to the systematics for the family Ariidae.
