= Pogonopoma obscurum =

Conservation status
- Vulnerable (IUCN 3.1)

Scientific classification
- Kingdom: Animalia
- Phylum: Chordata
- Class: Actinopterygii
- Order: Siluriformes
- Family: Loricariidae
- Subfamily: Rhinelepinae
- Genus: Pogonopoma
- Species: P. obscurum

Binomial name
- Pogonopoma obscurum Quevedo & R. E. dos Reis, 2002

Species of fish

Pogonopoma obscurum is a species of freshwater ray-finned fish belonging to the family Loricariidae, the armored catfishes, and the subfamily Rhinelepinae, the rhinelepine plecos. This catfish is endemic to Brazil where it occurs in the upper reaches of the Uruguay River, in the states of Rio Grande do Sul and Santa Catarina, southern Brazil. This species is fairly common and inhabits stretches of the main river and its tributaries, with relatively rapid water currents over bottoms usually formed by rocks and boulders. This species grows to a standard length of 25 cm (9.8 in).
