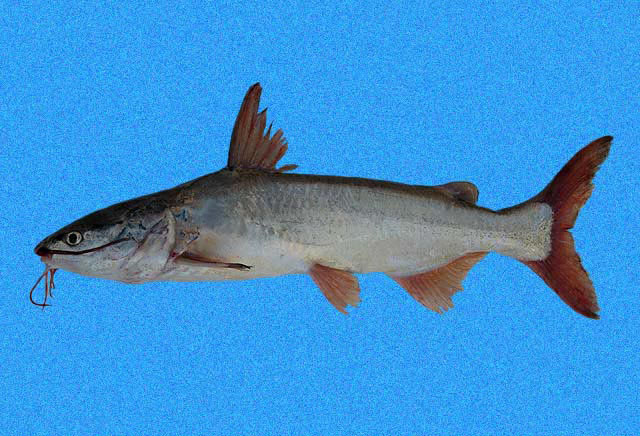

Conservation status
- Data Deficient (IUCN 3.1)

Scientific classification
- Kingdom: Animalia
- Phylum: Chordata
- Class: Actinopterygii
- Order: Siluriformes
- Family: Ariidae
- Genus: Cathorops
- Species: C. wayuu

Binomial name
- Cathorops wayuu Betancur-R., Acero P & Marceniuk, 2012
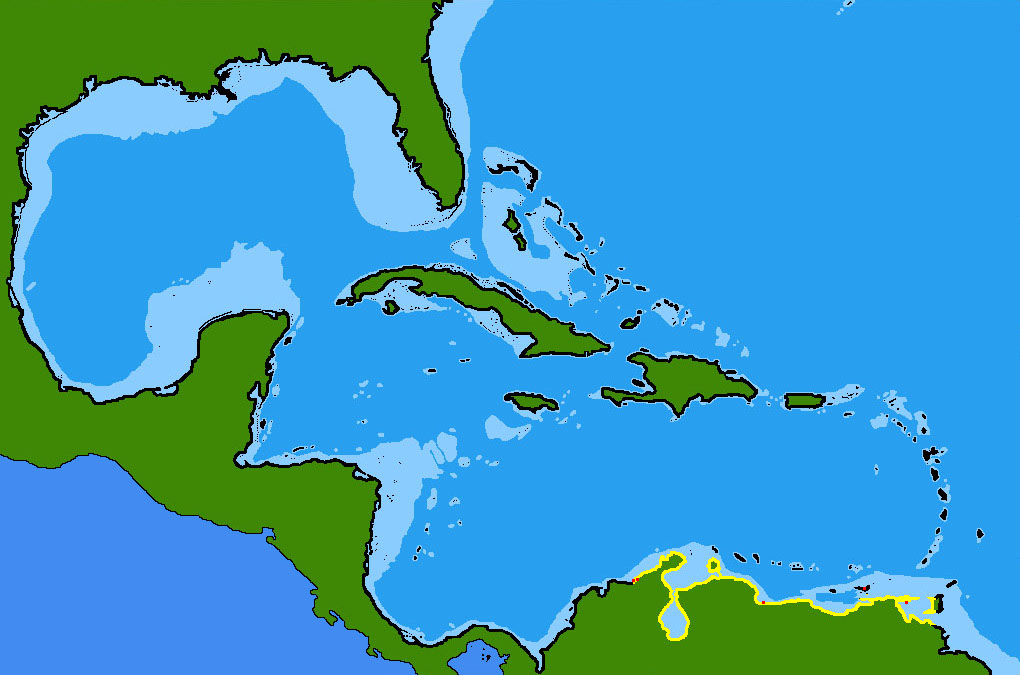

= Cathorops wayuu =

Species of fish

Cathorops wayuu, the Wayuu sea catfish, is a species of sea catfish. It is found in shallow coastal and estuarine waters from Camarones in Colombia to the Gulf of Paria in Venezuela. Maximum recorded body length is 31.4 cm.
