= Mapalé =

Afro-Colombian dance

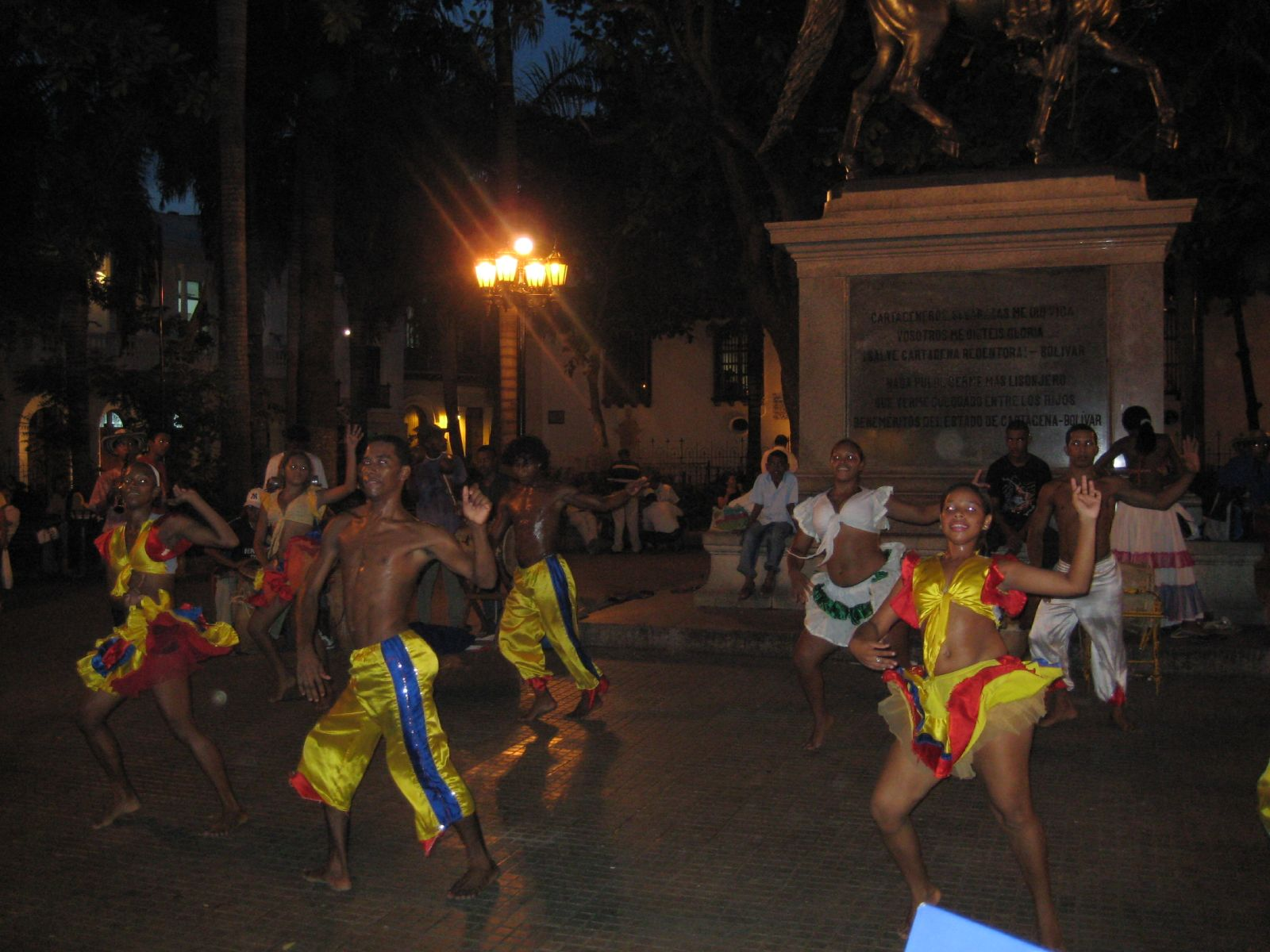
Mapalé

The Mapalé is an Afro-Colombian style of dance that was imported by slaves. It represented fishermen after a long day of work. Its name comes from the Cathorops mapale (fish) when they are out of the water. The dance moves are compared with the agility and strength of those who are performing them. The movements represent the fish out of the water (men), while the women represent the sea.

== History ==
The Mapalé was born as a song and dance of fishermen's work. It emerged on the Colombian Caribbean coast, thanks to the cultural influence of trafficked Africans who mainly came from Angola. When they managed to escape their captors, they founded quilombos or communities in remote places such as Palenque de San Basilio, where they affirmed their cultural heritage. Born in the Caribbean, it was introduced along the banks of the Magdalena River. It continues to be danced in descendants communities from Colombia to Panama to Peru and Ecuador.

Originally the dance was performed at night and accompanied by the yamaró and quitambre drums, the palms of the hands, and singing. Subsequently, its theme emphasized sexual rejoicing and became more frenetic. The choreography evolved from its African essence, both in its simple costumes, and in the machete (a work tool used in fishing). Some definitions indicate that the rhythm comes from a festival because of the abundant fish. The Mapalé has strong movements for which you must have good body management and discipline.

== Clothing ==
Costumes, both for men and for women, vary according to the dance and the performer.

=== Men ===
Men wear trousers that reach the heels, sometimes adorned with fringes or washers in the mouth of the leg.

=== Women ===
Women wear short skirts with fringes, raffias or small ruffles that emphasize the accelerated movement of their hips. They wear flat shoes or go barefoot and wear turbans of flags on their heads.

== Steps ==
The Mapalé couples dance apart or together, with short steps, very fast rhythm and with constant clapping. Choreographed routines may begin with forming two rows, one in front of the other and in a confrontation between man and woman moving forward and backward. This continues with free and individual exhibitions by the men with the purpose of pleasing their partners, who take turns responding to the confrontations. Their movements are frenetic and deliberately erotic. The women have different yet exciting and erotic movements of their own.
