= Cathorops agassizii =

Scientific classification
- Kingdom: Animalia
- Phylum: Chordata
- Class: Actinopterygii
- Order: Siluriformes
- Family: Ariidae
- Genus: Cathorops
- Species: C. agassizii

Binomial name
- Cathorops agassizii (C. H. Eigenmann & R. S. Eigenmann, 1888)

Synonyms
- Tachisurus agassizii C. H. Eigenmann & R. S. Eigenmann, 1888; Arius agassizi (C. H. Eigenmann & R. S. Eigenmann, 1888); Arius agassizii (C. H. Eigenmann & R. S. Eigenmann, 1888); Arius pleurops Boulenger, 1897

Species of fish

Cathorops agassizii is a species of sea catfish in the family Ariidae. It was described by Carl H. and Rosa Smith Eigenmann in 1888, originally under the genus Tachisurus. It is a tropical freshwater fish which is known from Guyana and Brazil. It reaches a maximum length of 32 cm (13 in).
