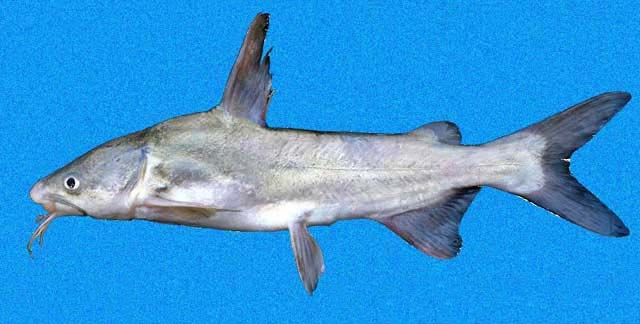

Conservation status
- Data Deficient (IUCN 3.1)

Scientific classification
- Domain: Eukaryota
- Kingdom: Animalia
- Phylum: Chordata
- Class: Actinopterygii
- Order: Siluriformes
- Family: Ariidae
- Genus: Cathorops
- Species: C. tuyra

Binomial name
- Cathorops tuyra (Meek & Hildebrand, 1923)
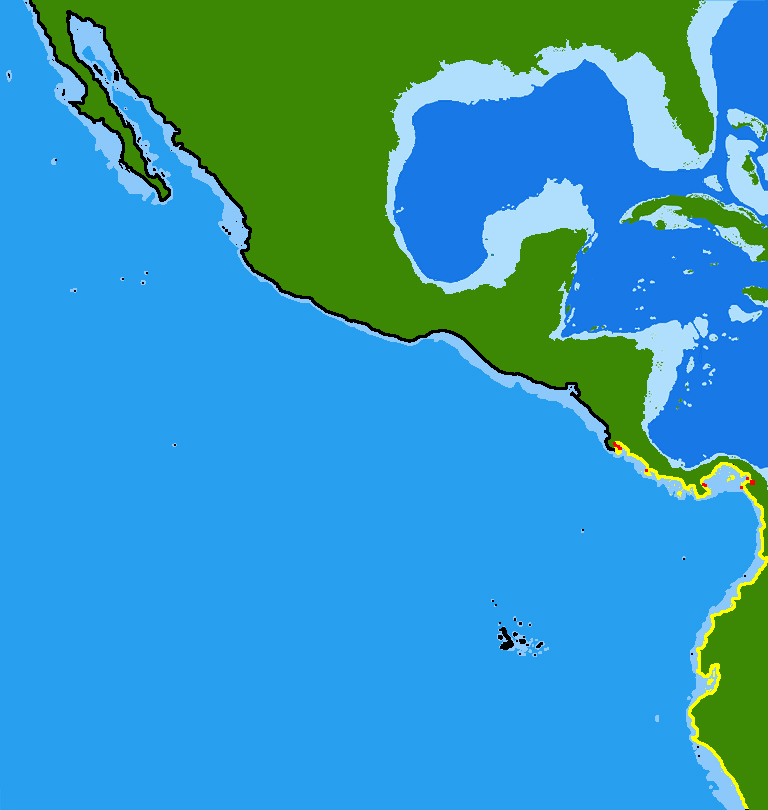

Synonyms
- Arius tuyra; Tachysurus tuyra

= Cathorops tuyra =

Species of fish

Cathorops tuyra, the Besudo sea catfish, is a species of sea catfish. It is found in shallow coastal and estuarine waters of the eastern Pacific from Costa Rica to southern Peru. Maximum recorded body length is 29 cm.
