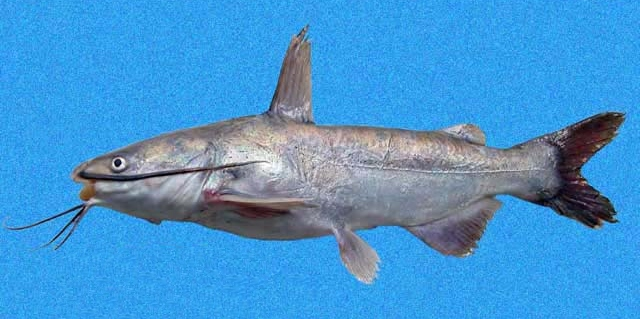

Conservation status
- Data Deficient (IUCN 3.1)

Scientific classification
- Domain: Eukaryota
- Kingdom: Animalia
- Phylum: Chordata
- Class: Actinopterygii
- Order: Siluriformes
- Family: Ariidae
- Genus: Cathorops
- Species: C. fuerthii

Binomial name
- Cathorops fuerthii (Steindachner, 1876)
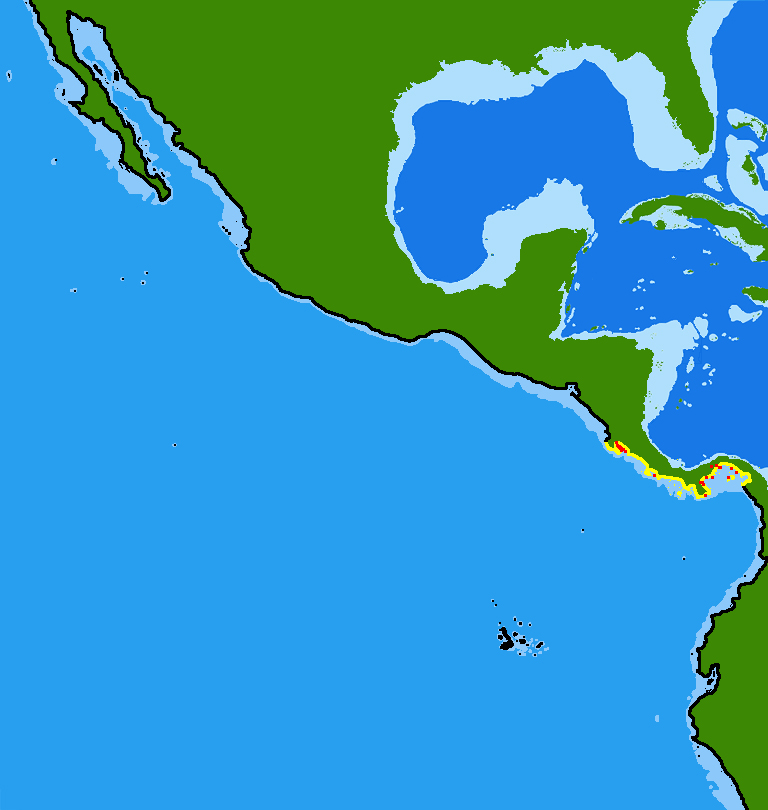

Synonyms
- Arius fuerthii; Arius fürthii; Arius melanopus; Galeichthys furthii; Tachisurus furthii; Tachysurus evermanni; Tachysurus furthii; Tachysurus liropus; Tachysurus melanopus

= Cathorops fuerthii =

Species of fish

Cathorops fuerthii, the Congo sea catfish, is a species of sea catfish. It is found in muddy and brackish waters at depths down to 20 m in the eastern Pacific from Mexico to Ecuador. Maximum recorded body length is 28 cm.
