= Cathorops festae =

Scientific classification
- Kingdom: Animalia
- Phylum: Chordata
- Class: Actinopterygii
- Order: Siluriformes
- Family: Ariidae
- Genus: Cathorops
- Species: C. festae

Binomial name
- Cathorops festae (Boulenger, 1898)

Species of fish

Cathorops festae is a species of sea catfish in the family Ariidae. It was described by George Albert Boulenger in 1898. It is known from Peru and Ecuador.
