= Cathorops nuchalis =

Scientific classification
- Domain: Eukaryota
- Kingdom: Animalia
- Phylum: Chordata
- Class: Actinopterygii
- Order: Siluriformes
- Family: Ariidae
- Genus: Cathorops
- Species: C. nuchalis

Binomial name
- Cathorops nuchalis (Günther, 1864)

Synonyms
- Arius nuchalis Günther, 1864; Tachysurus nuchalis (Günther, 1864); Tachisurus nuchalis (Günther, 1864); Arius laticeps Günther, 1864; Cathorops laticeps (Günther, 1864)

Species of fish

Cathorops nuchalis, the Orinoco sea catfish, is a species of catfish in the family Ariidae. It was described by Albert Günther in 1864. It is a tropical, fresh and saltwater catfish which occurs between Venezuela and Guyana. It reaches a standard length of 24.5 cm (9.6 in).
