= Cathorops melanopus =

Scientific classification
- Domain: Eukaryota
- Kingdom: Animalia
- Phylum: Chordata
- Class: Actinopterygii
- Order: Siluriformes
- Family: Ariidae
- Genus: Cathorops
- Species: C. melanopus

Binomial name
- Cathorops melanopus (Günther, 1864)

Synonyms
- Arius melanopus Günther, 1864; Tachisurus melanopus (Günther, 1864)

Species of fish

Cathorops melanopus, the dark sea catfish, is a species of catfish in the family Ariidae. It was described by Albert Günther in 1864. It is a tropical, freshwater catfish which occurs in Guatemala. It reaches a total length of 23 cm (9.1 in).
