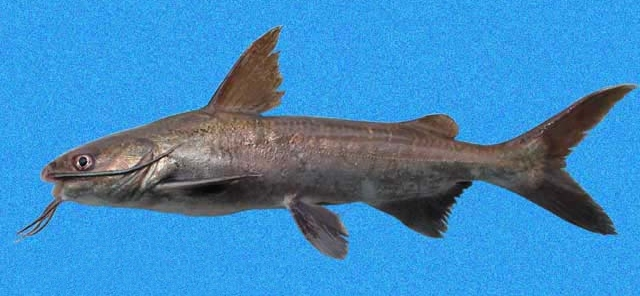

Conservation status
- Least Concern (IUCN 3.1)

Scientific classification
- Domain: Eukaryota
- Kingdom: Animalia
- Phylum: Chordata
- Class: Actinopterygii
- Order: Siluriformes
- Family: Ariidae
- Genus: Cathorops
- Species: C. dasycephalus

Binomial name
- Cathorops dasycephalus (Günther, 1864)
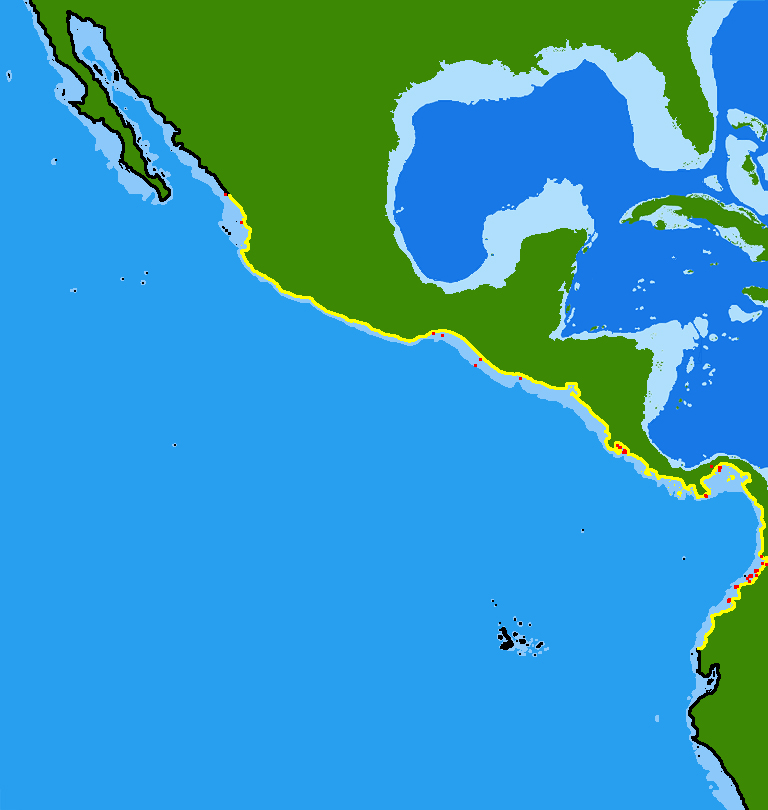

Synonyms
- Ariopsis dasycephalus; Arius dasycephalus; Galeichthys dasycephalus; Galeichthys longicephalus; Hexanematichthys dasycephalus; Hexanematichthys longicephalus; Tachisurus dasycephalus; Tachisurus longicephalus

= Cathorops dasycephalus =

Species of fish

Cathorops dasycephalus, the big-belly sea catfish, is a species of sea catfish. It is found in clear waters at depth between 10 and 30 m in the eastern Pacific from central Mexico to Ecuador. Maximum recorded body length is 29 cm.
