= Cathorops arenatus =

Conservation status
- Least Concern (IUCN 3.1)

Scientific classification
- Domain: Eukaryota
- Kingdom: Animalia
- Phylum: Chordata
- Class: Actinopterygii
- Order: Siluriformes
- Family: Ariidae
- Genus: Cathorops
- Species: C. arenatus

Binomial name
- Cathorops arenatus (Valenciennes, 1840)
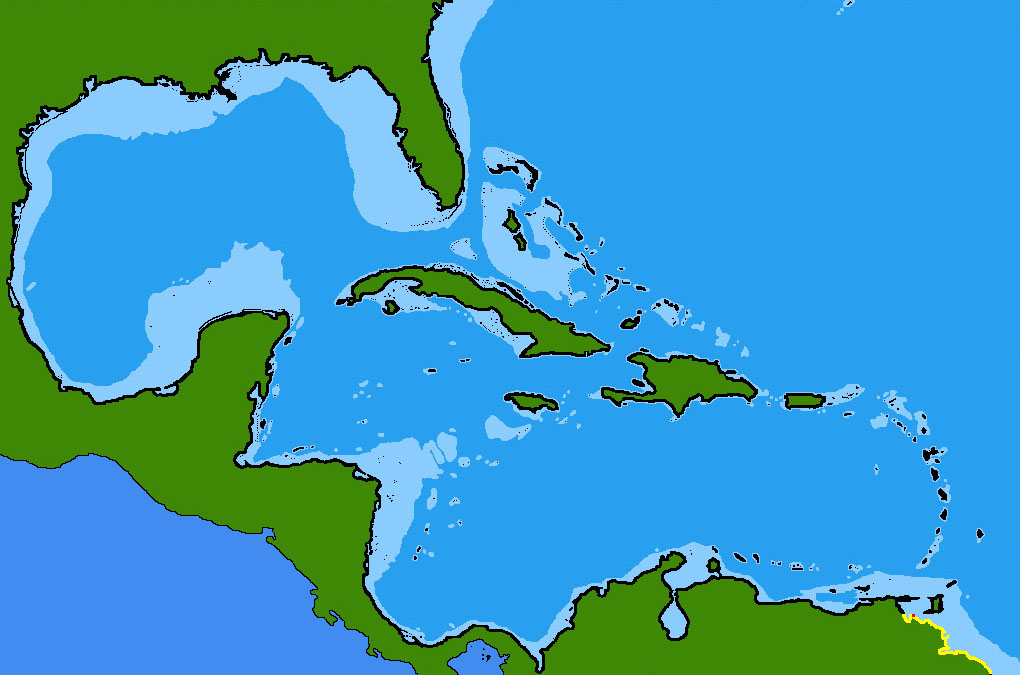

Synonyms
- Arius arenatus; Arius fissus; Cathorops fissus

Species of fish

Cathorops arenatus, the yellow sea catfish, is a species of sea catfish. It is found in the western Atlantic from the Gulf of Paria in Venezuela to Maranhão in Brazil. Maximum recorded body length is 25 cm.
