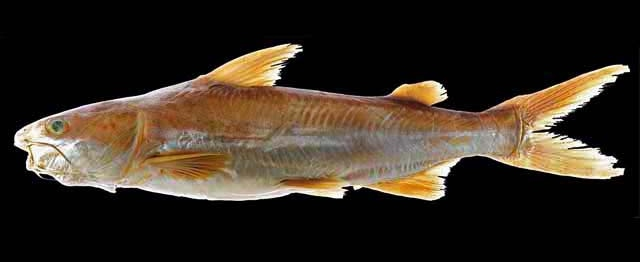

Conservation status
- Data Deficient (IUCN 3.1)

Scientific classification
- Domain: Eukaryota
- Kingdom: Animalia
- Phylum: Chordata
- Class: Actinopterygii
- Order: Siluriformes
- Family: Ariidae
- Genus: Cathorops
- Species: C. taylori

Binomial name
- Cathorops taylori (Hildebrand, 1925)
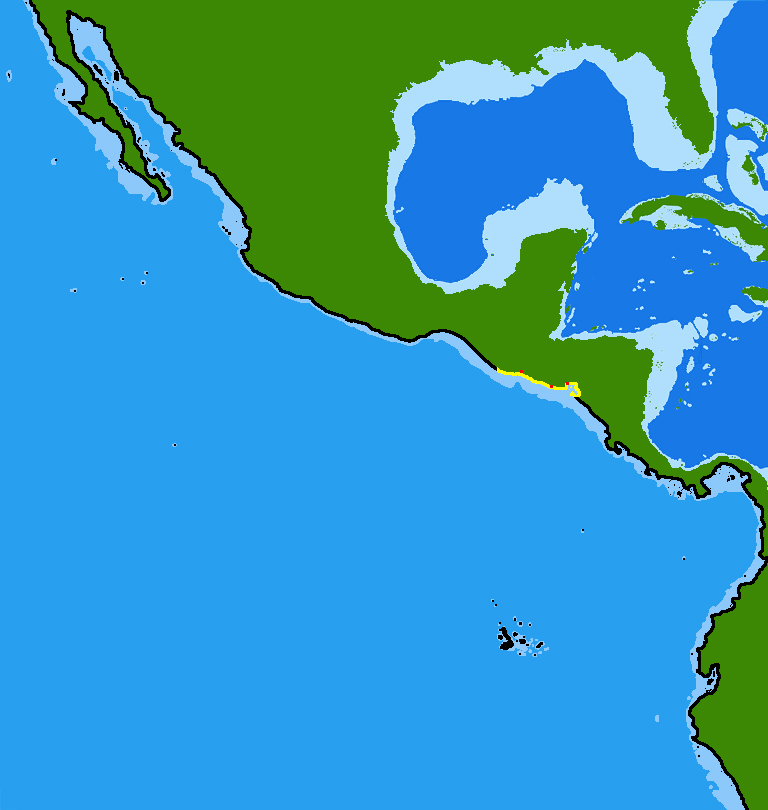

Synonyms
- Arius taylori

= Cathorops taylori =

Species of fish

Cathorops taylori, the Taylor's sea catfish, is a species of sea catfish. It is found in estuaries at depths below 20 m from Mexico to El Salvador in the Eastern Pacific. Maximum recorded body length is 28.3 cm.
