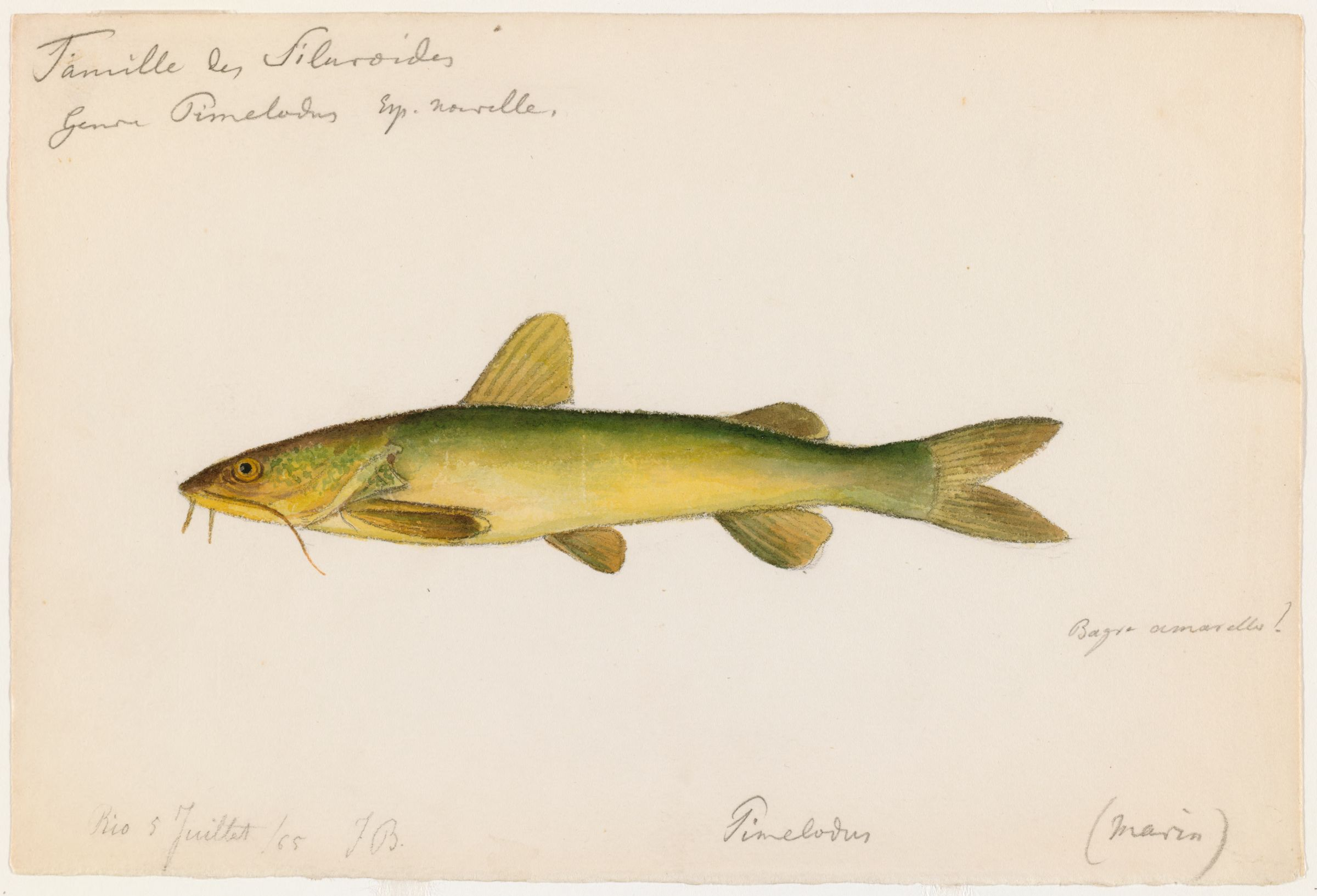

Scientific classification
- Kingdom: Animalia
- Phylum: Chordata
- Class: Actinopterygii
- Order: Siluriformes
- Family: Ariidae
- Genus: Cathorops
- Species: C. spixii

Binomial name
- Cathorops spixii (Agassiz, 1829)

Synonyms
- Pimelodus spixii Agassiz, 1829; Arius spixii (Agassiz, 1829); Arius spixi (Agassiz, 1829); Cathorops spixi (Agassiz, 1829); Pimelodus albidus Spix & Agassiz, 1829; Arius nigricans Valenciennes, 1834

= Cathorops spixii =

Species of fish

Cathorops spixii, the Madamango sea catfish, raspfin sea catfish or spring cuirass, is a species of catfish in the family Ariidae. It was described by Louis Agassiz in 1829. It is a tropical, marine and brackish water-dwelling catfish which occurs between Colombia and Brazil. It inhabits a depth range between 1 and 50 m (3.3 and 164.0 ft). It reaches a maximum total length of 30 cm (12 in), more commonly reaching a TL of 20 cm (7.9 in).

Cathorops spixii feeds on a variety of crustaceans, including amphipods, copepods, isopods; as well as bony fish and benthic invertebrates. It is preyed upon by Arius parkeri and Elops saurus. It is marketed commercially.

The species epithet refers to biologist Johann Baptist von Spix.
