= Conguito sea catfish =

Scientific classification
- Domain: Eukaryota
- Kingdom: Animalia
- Phylum: Chordata
- Class: Actinopterygii
- Order: Siluriformes
- Family: Ariidae
- Genus: Cathorops
- Species: C. liropus

Binomial name
- Cathorops liropus (Bristol, 1897)

Synonyms
- Tachysurus liropus Bristol, 1897

Species of fish

The Conguito sea catfish (Cathorops liropus) is a species of catfish in the family Ariidae. It was described by Susan Brown Bristol in 1897. It is a tropical, freshwater catfish which occurs in Mexico. It reaches a standard length of 19.7 cm (7.8 in).
