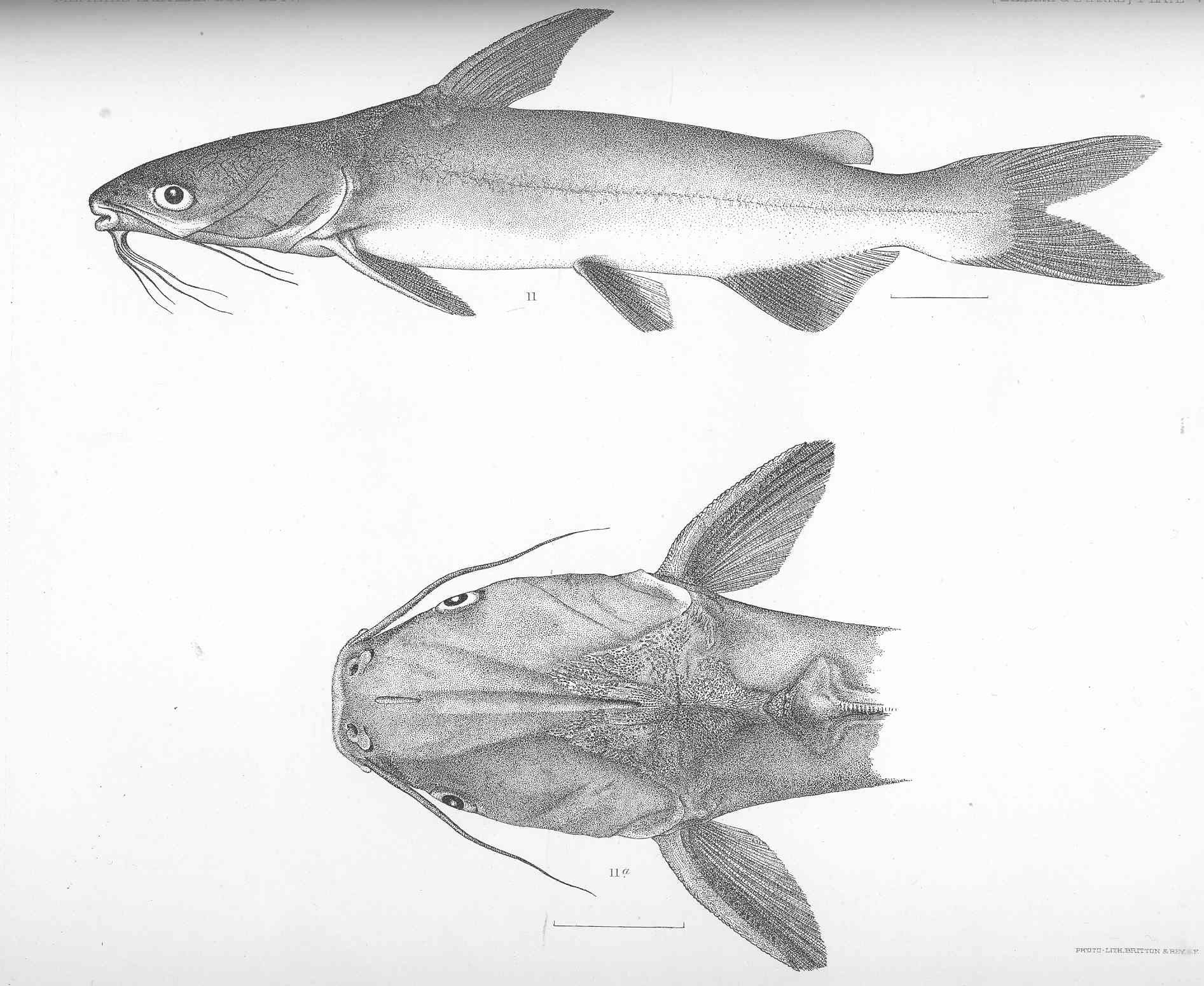

Scientific classification
- Domain: Eukaryota
- Kingdom: Animalia
- Phylum: Chordata
- Class: Actinopterygii
- Order: Siluriformes
- Family: Ariidae
- Genus: Cathorops
- Species: C. multiradiatus

Binomial name
- Cathorops multiradiatus (Günther, 1864)

Synonyms
- Arius multiradiatus Günther, 1864; Bagrus arioides Kner, 1863; Tachysurus emmelane Gilbert, 1898; Tachysurus equatorialis Starks, 1906

= Cathorops multiradiatus =

Species of fish

Cathorops multiradiatus, the box sea catfish, is a species of catfish in the family Ariidae. It was described by Albert Günther in 1864. It is a tropical, marine catfish which occurs in Guatemala, Costa Rica, El Salvador, Colombia, Peru, Ecuador, Mexico, Nicaragua, Honduras, and Panama. It dwells at a maximum depth of 20 m (66 ft). It reaches a 30 cm (12 in).

Due to its wide distribution and population density, as well as a lack of major threats or perceived decline in population, the IUCN redlist lists the box sea catfish as Least Concern. It is commercially marketed both fresh and frozen.
