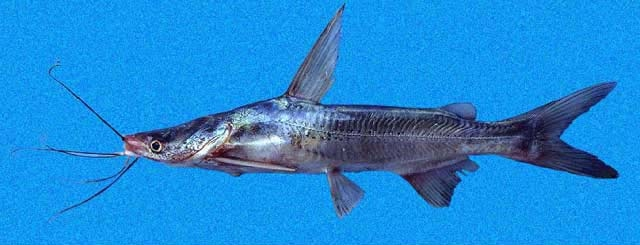

Conservation status
- Least Concern (IUCN 3.1)

Scientific classification
- Domain: Eukaryota
- Kingdom: Animalia
- Phylum: Chordata
- Class: Actinopterygii
- Order: Siluriformes
- Family: Ariidae
- Genus: Cathorops
- Species: C. hypophthalmus

Binomial name
- Cathorops hypophthalmus (Steindachner, 1876)
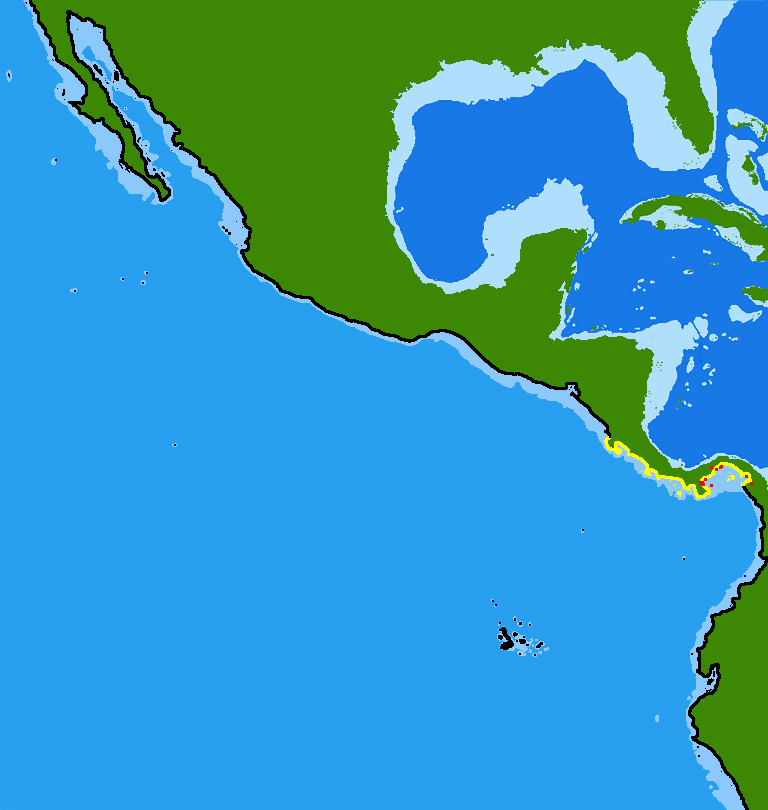

Synonyms
- Arius hypophthalmus; Cathorops gulosus; Galeichthys hypophthalmus; Tachisurus gulosus; Tachisurus hypophthalmus

= Cathorops hypophthalmus =

Species of fish

Cathorops hypophthalmus, the gloomy sea catfish, is a species of sea catfish. It is found in coastal and estuarine waters of Costa Rica and Panama. Maximum recorded body length is 35 cm.
