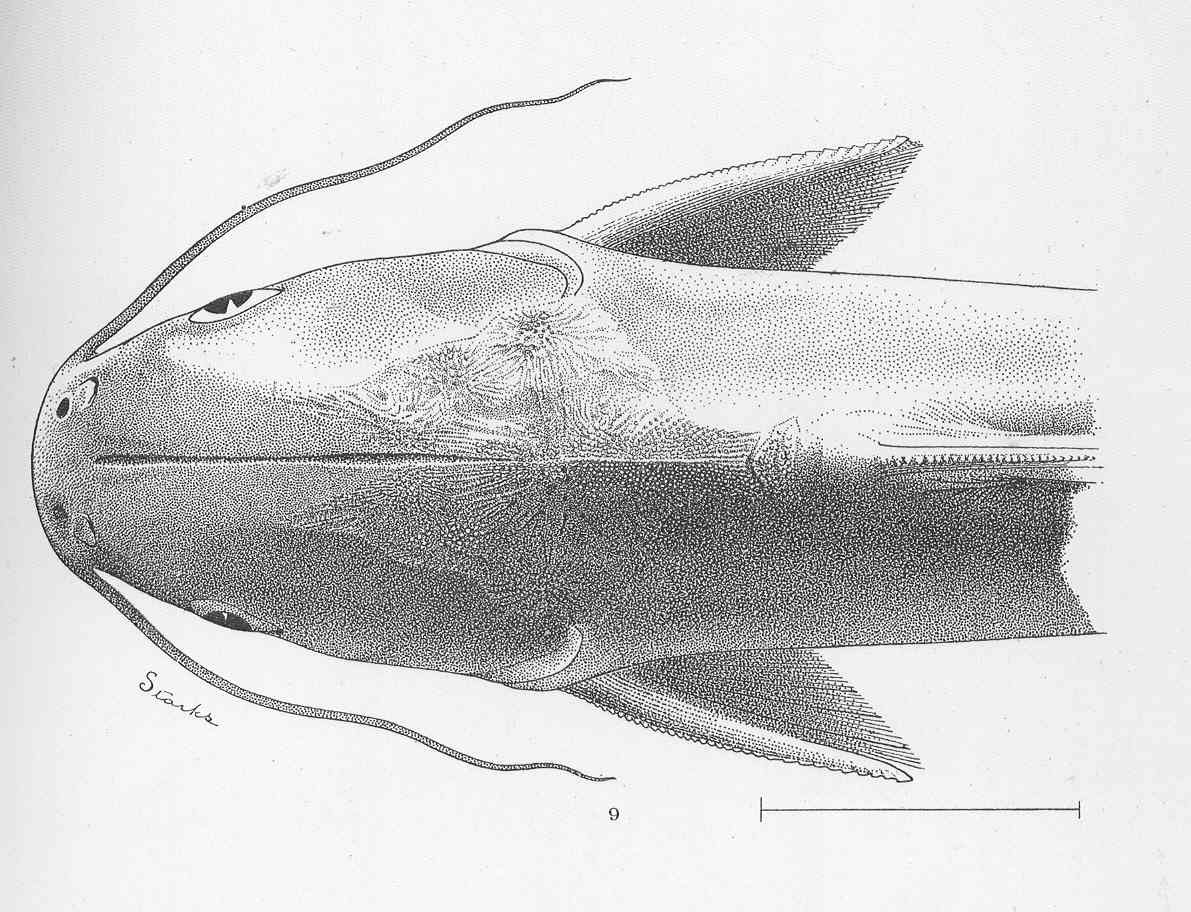

Conservation status
- Data Deficient (IUCN 3.1)

Scientific classification
- Domain: Eukaryota
- Kingdom: Animalia
- Phylum: Chordata
- Class: Actinopterygii
- Order: Siluriformes
- Family: Ariidae
- Genus: Cathorops
- Species: C. steindachneri

Binomial name
- Cathorops steindachneri (Gilbert & Starks, 1904)

Synonyms
- Tachysurus steindachneri Gilbert & Starks, 1904; Arius steindachneri (Gilbert & Starks, 1904); Cathorops steindechneri (Gilbert & Starks, 1904)

= Cathorops steindachneri =

Species of fish

Cathorops steindachneri, or Steindachner's sea catfish, is a species of catfish in the family Ariidae. It was described by Charles Henry Gilbert and Edwin Chapin Starks in 1904. It is a tropical, marine and freshwater-dwelling catfish which occurs between Costa Rica and Peru. It dwells at a maximum depth of 20 m (66 ft). It reaches a maximum total length of 36 cm (14 in), more commonly reaching a TL of 20 cm (7.9 in).

The fish is named in honor of Austrian ichthyologist Franz Steindachner.

Due to insufficient statistical information on the species, the IUCN redlist lists Cathorops steindachneri as Data Deficient. It notes that pollution and coastal development pose a threat for the species. It is marketed commercially, although its small size makes it an uncommon food fish.
