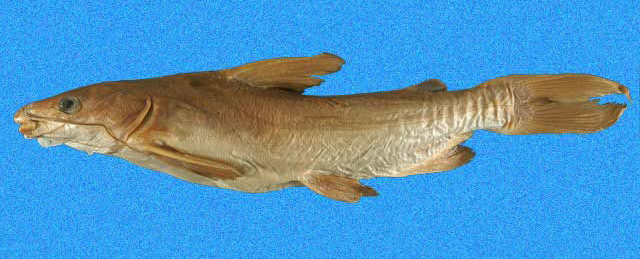

Scientific classification
- Kingdom: Animalia
- Phylum: Chordata
- Class: Actinopterygii
- Order: Siluriformes
- Family: Ariidae
- Genus: Cathorops
- Species: C. aguadulce

Binomial name
- Cathorops aguadulce (Meek, 1904)
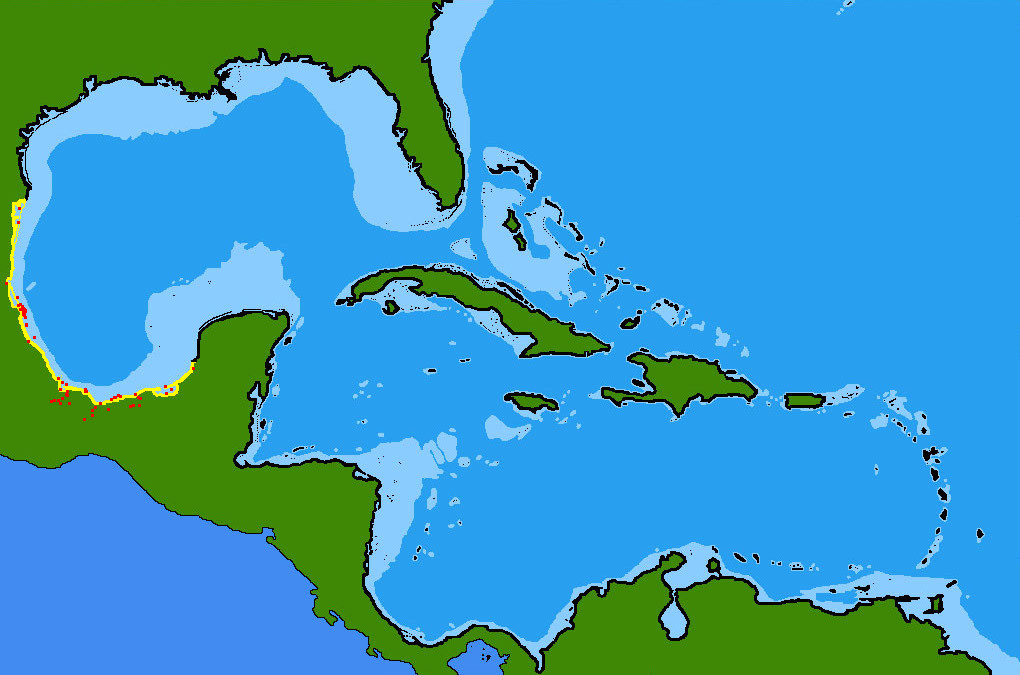

Synonyms
- Galeichthys aguadulce Meek, 1904; Arius aguadulce (Meek, 1904)

= Estuarine sea catfish =

Species of fish

The estuarine sea catfish (Cathorops aguadulce), also known as the Aguadulce sea catfish, is a species of sea catfish in the family Ariidae. It was described by Seth Eugene Meek in 1904, originally under the genus Galeichthys. It is a tropical fish which is known from Mexico to Guatemala, where it typically inhabits freshwater rivers, lagoons, and drainages, also sometimes dwelling in marine waters. It reaches a maximum standard length of 22.7 cm (8.9 in).
