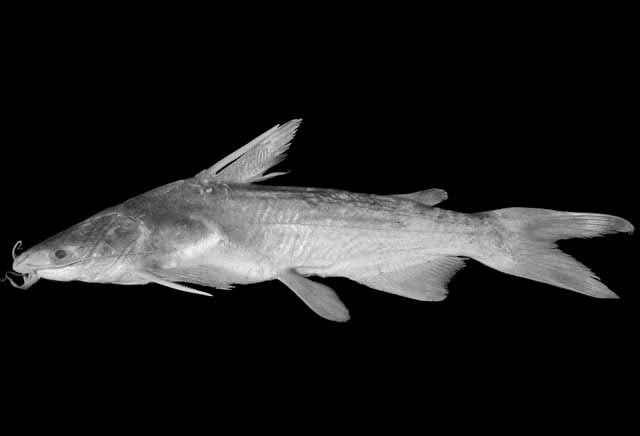

Scientific classification
- Domain: Eukaryota
- Kingdom: Animalia
- Phylum: Chordata
- Class: Actinopterygii
- Order: Siluriformes
- Family: Ariidae
- Genus: Cathorops
- Species: C. mapale

Binomial name
- Cathorops mapale Betancur-R. & Acero, 2005

= Cathorops mapale =

Species of fish

The Mapale sea catfish (Cathorops mapale), is a species of sea catfish in the family Ariidae. It is a tropical fish which is known from Colombia to west Venezuela, where it typically inhabits freshwaters, brackish, in coastal lagoons and near-shore marine waters. It reaches a maximum standard length of 30.6 cm (12.0 in).
