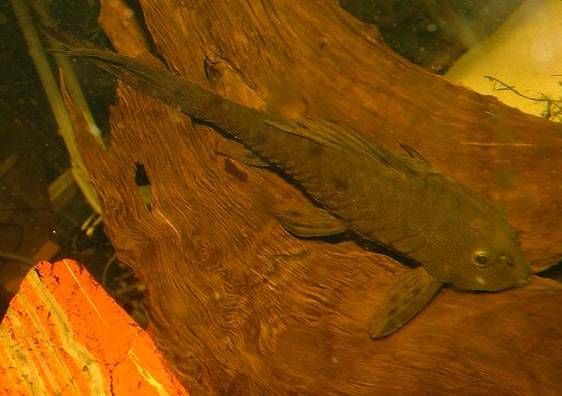

Conservation status
- Least Concern (IUCN 3.1)

Scientific classification
- Kingdom: Animalia
- Phylum: Chordata
- Class: Actinopterygii
- Order: Siluriformes
- Family: Loricariidae
- Subfamily: Rhinelepinae
- Genus: Pseudorinelepis; Bleeker, 1862
- Species: P. genibarbis

Binomial name
- Pseudorinelepis genibarbis (Valenciennes, 1840)

Synonyms
- Genus: Canthopomus C. H. Eigenmann, 1910; Canthopomus C. H. Eigenmann & Allen, 1942; Monistiancistrus Fowler, 1940; Species: Rinelepis genibarbis Valenciennes, 1840; Rhinelepis agassizii Steindachner, 1877; Pseudorinelepis agassizii (Steindachner 1877); Plecostomus pellegrini Regan, 1904; Pseudorinelepis pellegrini (Regan, 1904); Monistiancistrus carachama Fowler, 1940

= Pseudorinelepis =

Genus of fishes

Pseudorinelepis is a monospecific genus of freshwater ray-finned fish belonging to the family Loricariidae, the armoured suckermouth catfishes, and the subfamily Rhinelepinae. The only species in this genus is Pseudorinelepis genibarbis, the pine-cone pleco. This catfish is found in the Amazon basin of Brazil, Ecuador and Peru.

== Taxonomy ==
Pseudorinelepis was first proposed as a genus in 1862 by the Dutch ichthyologist, herpetologist and physician Pieter Bleeker, with Rinelepis genibarbis designated as its type species. R. genibarbis was first formally described in 1840 by Achille Valenciennes, with its type locality thought to be Brazil.

Pseudorinelepis is one of three genera contained in the subfamily Rhinelepinae, formerly regarded as a tribe in the subfamily Hypostominae, of the family Loricariidae in the suborder Loricarioidei in the Siluriformes, the catfish order.

Canthopomus and Monistiancistrus are synonyms of the genus Pseudorinelepis. Previously, Pseudorinelepis was a genus of four species, but now the other three species are synonymous with P. genibarbis.

== Appearance and anatomy ==
P. genibarbis is large and bulky and reaches a length of 35.6 centimetres (14.0 in) SL. The armor plates along the side of the fish are thick, are keeled, and encase the whole body. The adipose fin is not present. Like other members of Rhinelepini, they do not have the omega iris that is typical in most species of Loricariids. In Iquitos, Peru, it is known as carachama sin costilla, which actually means "Loricariid without ribs"; this refers to the trait that it shares with other Rhinelepini catfish that do not have ribs past the sixth vertebra.

This species is highly variable in coloration. P. genibarbis may be completely dark brown to black, mottled with tan to dark brown background and black streaks, or light tan with large, sparse spots located at base of lateral plates, fin membranes, and abdomen.

Males have longer odontodes on the cheek that are denser and more numerous than in females. It has been suggested that breeding males may also have orange on the cheeks and dorsal and caudal fin spines, although this may be restricted to fish from the Branco River.

== Ecology ==
P. genibarbis is found in small, sluggish streams, floodplain lakes, and large rivers. Water quality measurements showed that the water tended to be low in oxygen, but neutral (pH 7.0).

P. genibarbis is able to swallow air, like many other Loricariids. However, this species is not an obligate air-breather. When disturbed, it is able to swallow air to become neutrally buoyant and swim in the water column.

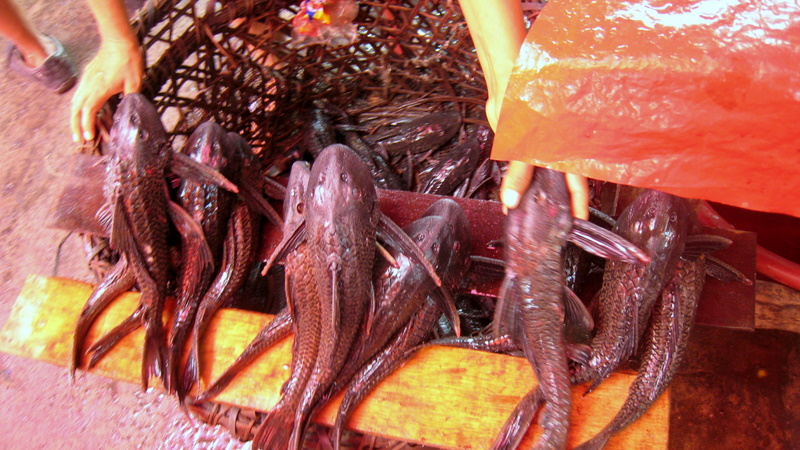
Carachama fish on the market, Peru

== In captivity ==
This species is an armored catfish which, since the 1990s, has started to be offered quite regularly as an aquarium fish under the name "Pineapple Pleco". The term "pleco" here is of course a popular generalisation, as taxonomy has never placed this fish in the former genus Plecostomus. The armour is also pleasantly spiked along the sides of the fish, which causes the pineapple resemblance celebrated in the commercial name of the species. Additionally, under the L-number system used by hobbyists, it as referred to as both L152 and L095.

There is quite a degree of colour variation, which is probably the main reason for the confusion over species. Some males having orange cheeks, which is why "orange cheek Pleco" is another common name found in circulation. This is not made any easier by the fact that the fish will gradually darken if left in a tank with a darker substrate and lighten when kept on a lighter substrate. These changes take some time (hours or days) to effect, they do not happen quickly, so there is no real "chameleon" effect here, but no doubt it is a useful survival mechanism.

From the viewpoint of the aquarist the fish is peaceful, sociable with others of its own type, non-territorial and omnivorous. Unsurprisingly, therefore, they do well in soft water, although pH values of up to 7.5 are acceptable, and the temperature range may fluctuate gently between 23 and 27 °C (73 and 81 °F).

Spawning in captivity has not yet been reliably reported. Sexual dimorphism is slight, being determined mainly by a more rounded body shape in the females, and orange "cheeks", this refers to the operculum, in the males.

The fish will, unlike most hypostomines, feed on flake from the water surface, turning upside-down to do so. It is also able to augment water-dissolved oxygen with atmospheric oxygen, but does not need to do so, having fully functional gills, so when this fish does gulp it is a useful warning that the aeration in the tank is low.

== See also ==
- List of freshwater aquarium fish species
