= Johann Baptist von Spix =

German biologist (1781–1826)

Johann Baptist Von Spix
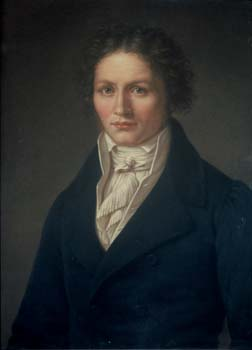
- Born: Johann Baptist Spix; 9 February 1781; Höchstadt an der Aisch, Prince-Bishopric of Bamberg
- Died: 13 March 1826 (aged 45); Munich, Kingdom of Bavaria, German Confederation
- Scientific career
- Fields: Biology
- Academic advisors: Georges Cuvier
- Notable students: Carl Friedrich Philipp von Martius
- Author abbrev. (botany): Spix
- Author abbrev. (zoology): Spix

Johann Baptist Ritter von Spix (9 February 1781 – 13 March 1826) was a German biologist. From his expedition to Brazil, he brought to Germany a large variety of specimens of plants, insects, mammals, birds, amphibians and fish. They constitute an important basis for today's National Zoological Collection in Munich. Numerous examples of his ethnographic collections, such as dance masks and the like, are now part of the collection of the Museum of Ethnography in Munich.

== Biography ==
Spix was born in Höchstadt, Germany, the seventh of eleven children. His childhood home is the site of the Spix Museum, open to the public since 2004. He studied philosophy in Bamberg and graduated with a doctoral degree. Later he studied theology in Würzburg. After attending lectures of the young professor F. W. J. Schelling, Spix became interested in nature. He quit his theology studies and began studying medicine, which he finished with a second doctoral degree in 1807.

After a short time working as a physician in Bamberg, he was appointed by King Maximilian I Joseph of Bavaria as a student of zoology in Munich at the Bavarian Academy of Sciences and Humanities in Munich in 1808. He received a scholarship to go to Paris to learn scientific zoology with Georges Cuvier and others. From there he also made a first excursion to the sea coast of Normandy in Northern France. Later he travelled to Southern France and Italy, collecting animals for the zoological collection of the Bavarian Academy of Sciences and Humanities and investigating marine animals.

In 1810, Spix came back to Munich where he sorted the zoological collection and wrote his first publication on starfish and other marine animals. After this first fundamental publication, a book about the history of zoological classification, published in 1811, he was appointed member of the Bavarian Academy of Sciences. Spix was also appointed the first conservator, now inline with the title director, of the Bavarian zoological collection, considered as the foundation of the Zoologische Staatssammlung München. He published several further works, the most important being a comparative morphology of the skulls of many different animals, including men, primates, reptiles, birds, and others. This book, the Cephalogenesis, published in 1815, was written in Latin and illustrated with beautiful lithographs.

== Expedition to Brazil ==
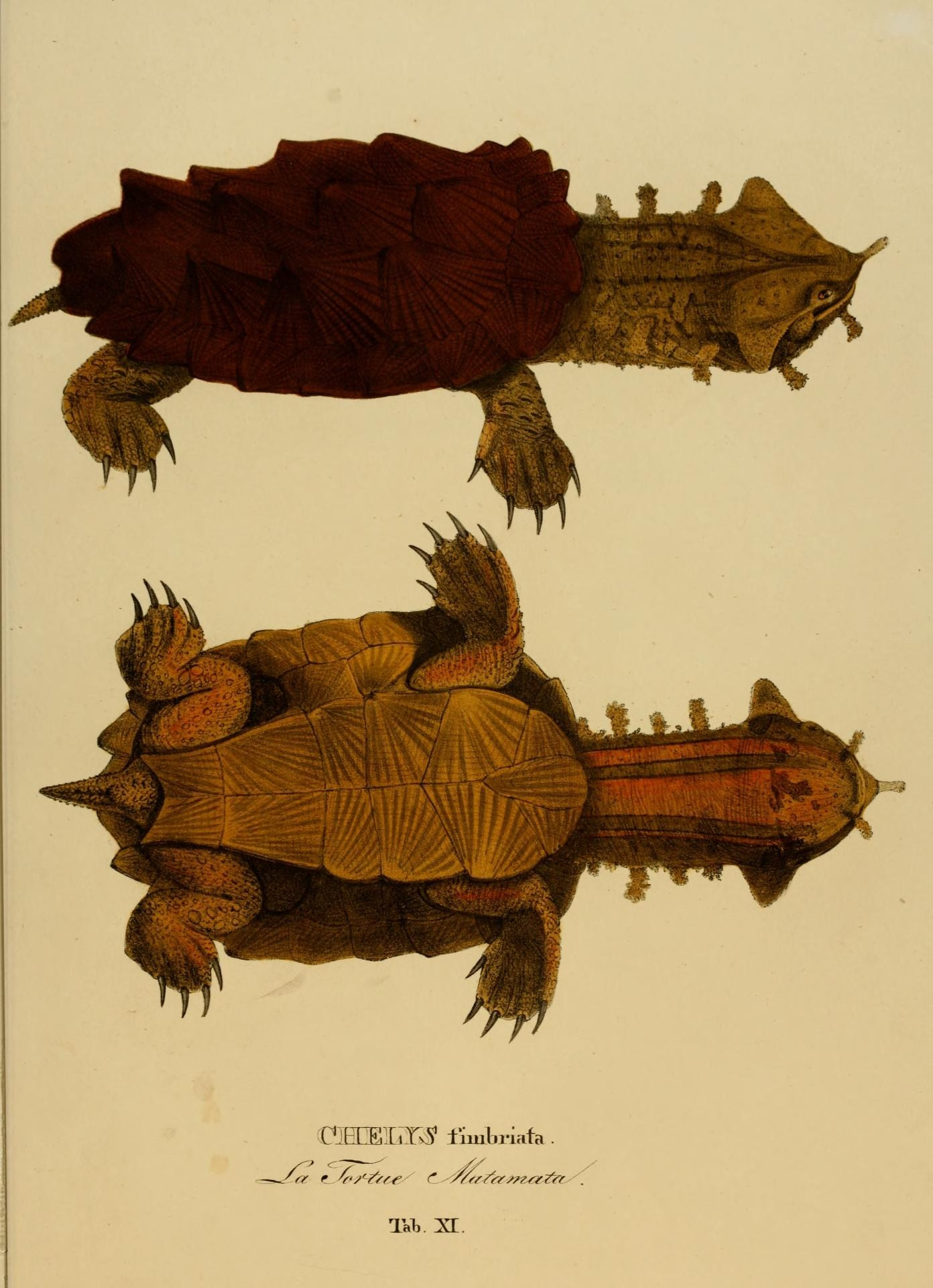
Illustration of a mata mata collected by Spix in Brazil

In 1817, Spix and Carl Friedrich Philipp von Martius travelled to Brazil with a group of Austrian naturalists who accompanied Maria Leopoldina of Austria. First they went to Rio de Janeiro, but they soon left the Austrian group and travelled on their own through Brazil. Spix and Martius travelled from southern Rio de Janeiro to northern São Paulo. During this part of their journey, they were accompanied by the Austrian painter Thomas Ender. Then they continued to Ouro Preto and Diamantina, in the province of Minas Gerais, where they described the mining of diamonds. From there, they went further into the continent and then back to the coast of Salvador.

They crossed the dry Caatinga in northeast Brazil, suffering from different severe diseases, and almost dying several times of thirst. During the whole journey, they collected and described animals and plants, but also everything else of scientific interest. They also described indigenous people and their habits, as well as anything of possible economic importance. They additionally investigated the giant Bendegó meteorite. They discovered fossil fishes of the Santana Formation.

The last part of the expedition was the journey up to the Amazon River, then in the Captaincy of Grão-Pará. There Spix and Martius went on separate routes to explore the region. Spix went to Tabatinga, to the border of Peru, and from Manaus up the Negro River. Martius travelled by boat to the Yupurá River, and from there he brought to Munich two Brazilian indigenous children from two different tribes, the Juri and the Miranha. The children were baptized Johannes and Isabella. Spix and Martius returned in 1820 to Munich with specimens of thousands of plants, animals, and ethnological objects. The zoological specimens formed the basis of the collection of the Natural History Museum in Munich, the ethnological objects of Spix and Martius are the basis of the Museum für Völkerkunde München (now: Museum Fünf Kontinente).

== Publications ==
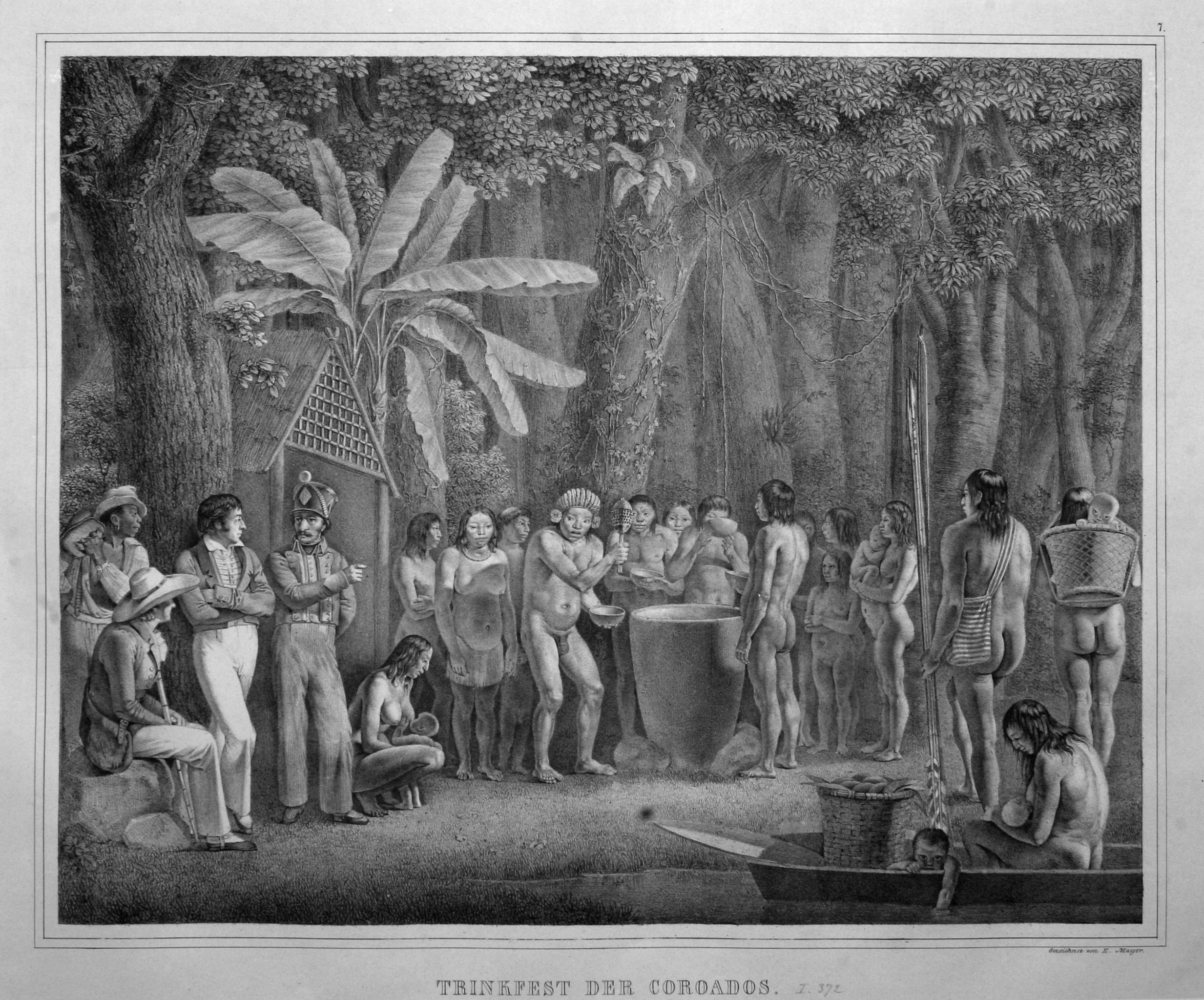
Travels in Brazil, in the years 1817-1820

Spix was honoured and knighted by the king of Bavaria. He worked hard on his zoological materials and prepared a description of the journey together with Martius. This description was printed in three volumes in 1823, 1828 and 1831, translated into English (first volume only) and Portuguese, which are still of great importance. Spix died during the preparation of the second volume, but Martius finished its publication using the notes of Spix and himself. Spix described and named many birds, primates, bats, and reptiles. Altogether he described some 500 to 600 species and subspecies. Furthermore, several species are named after him. Among Spix's most renowned discoveries is the species Spix's macaw, named after the explorer by the German naturalist Georg Marcgrave. He died on 13 May 1826 in Munich, possibly from a tropical disease acquired on his expedition.

== Legacy ==
Spix is commemorated in the scientific names of three species of South American reptiles: Acanthochelys spixii, a turtle; Chironius spixii, a snake; and Micrurus spixii, a venomous coral snake.

Birds named for Spix include Spix's guan (Penelope jacquacu), Spix's macaw (Cyanospitta spixii), Spix's warbling-antbird (Hypocnemis striata), Spix's woodcreeper (Xiphorhynchus spixii), and Spix's spinetail (Synallaxis spixi).

Mammals named for Spix include Spix's disk-winged bat (Thyroptera tricolor), Spix's red-handed howler (Alouatta discolor), Spix's white-fronted capuchin (Cebus unicolor), Spix's night monkey (Aotus vociferans), and Spix's yellow-toothed cavy (Galea spixii).

The catfish Cathorops spixii was named in his honor in 1829.

Asolene spixii is named for Spix.

The University of Bamberg, Germany, has established an annual international visiting professorship that carries Spix' name.

== Works ==
- 1811: Geschichte und Beurtheilung aller Systeme in der Zoologie nach ihrer Entwicklungsfolge von Aristoteles bis auf die gegenwärtige Zeit. Schrag'sche Buchhandlung I-XIV; 710pp.
- 1815: Cephalogenesis sive Capitis Ossei Structura, Formatio et Significatio per omnes Animalium Classes, Familias, Genera ac Aetates digesta, atque Tabulis illustrata, Legesque simul Psychologiae, Cranioscopiae ac Physiognomiae inde derivatae.-Typis Francisci Seraphici Hübschmanni, Monachii: 11 and 72pp; 9 Taf.
- 1823: Simiarum et Vespertilionum Brasiliensium species novae ou Histoire Naturelle des espècies nouvelles de singes et de chauves - souris observées et recueillies pendant le voyage dans l'interieur du Brésil exécuté par ordre de S M Le Roi de Bavière dans les années 1817, 1818, 1819, 1820. Typis Francisci Seraphi Hybschmanni, Monachii: I - VIII, 1-72, 28 tables.
- 1824a: Animalia nova sive species novae Testudinum et Ranarum, quas in itinere per Brasiliam annis MDCCCXVII - MDCCCXX Iussu et Auspiciis Maximiliani Josephi I. Bavariae Regis suscepto collegit et descripsit. Typis Franc. Seraph. Hübschmanni, Monachii: 1-29, 22 tables - 1981 Soc. for the Study of Amphibians and Reptiles with an introduction by P. E. Vanzolini
- 1824b: Avium species novae, quas in itinere per Brasiliam Annis MDCCCXVII - MDCCCXX Iussu et Auspiciis Maximiliani Josephi I. Bavariae Regis suscepto collegit et descripsit. Typis Franc. Seraph. Hübschmanni, Monachii: Tom. I, 1-90, 91 tabes; Tom. II, 1-85, 109 Taf.
- Spix & Wagler 1824: Serpentum Brasiliensium Species novae ou Histoire Naturelle des especes nouvelles de Serpens, Recueillies et observées pendent le voyage dans l'interieur du Brésil dans les Années 1817, 1818, 1819, 1820 ... publiée par Jean de Spix, ... écrite dàprès les notes du Voyageur par Jean Wagler. Typis Franc. Seraph. Hübschmanni, Monachii: 1-75, 26 Taf. - reprinted 1981 Soc. for the Study of Amphibians and Reptiles, Oxford; with an introduction by P. E. Vanzolini
- Spix & Martius 1823–1831: Reise in Brasilien auf Befehl Sr. Majestät Maximilian Joseph I. König von Baiern in den Jahren 1817–1820 gemacht und beschrieben. 3 Volumes and one Atlas - Verlag M. Lindauer, München. 1388pp. (Bd. II und III edited by C.F.Ph. v. Martius) - reprint, 1967, F. A. Brockhaus Komm. Ges. Abt. Antiquarium, Stuttgart - also English (1st vol.) and Portuguese translations available.

== See also ==
- Category:Taxa named by Johann Baptist von Spix

== Sources ==
- Adler, Kraig (1989), "Spix, J. B. von (1781–1826)", in Contributions to the History of Herpetology – Society for the Study of Amphibians and Reptiles, page 23.
- (in German) Fittkau, E. J. (1995); Johann Baptist Ritter von Spix. Rundgespräche d. Kommission f. Ökologie, Tropenforschung - Bayer. Akad. d. Wissenschaften. 10: 29–38.
- Sanders, A. P. M. (1975). "Spix, Johann Baptist von". In Charles Coulston Gillispie (ed.). Dictionary of Scientific Biography. Vol. 12. New York: Charles Scribner's Sons. p. 578. ISBN 0-684-10114-9.
- (in German) Schönitzer, Klaus; Ein Leben für die Zoologie – Die Reisen und Forschungen des Johann Baptist Ritter von Spix, Allitera Verlag, edition monacensia, München 2011, 224 S. ISBN 978-3-86906-179-5.
- Vanzolini, Paulo Emilio (1981), "The scientific and political contents of the Bavarian expedition to Brasil". In Herpetology of Brasil. Edited by: Soc. for the study of amphibians and reptiles, Oxford, pages IX –XXIX. The book is mainly a reprint of herpetological works from Spix, see also the introduction by K. Adler, pages v–vii.
