= Rhinelepinae =

Scientific classification
- Kingdom: Animalia
- Phylum: Chordata
- Class: Actinopterygii
- Order: Siluriformes
- Family: Loricariidae
- Subfamily: Rhinelepinae; Armbruster, 2004

Genera
- see text

Subfamily of fishes

Rhinelepinae, the rhinelepine plecos, is a subfamily of freshwater ray-finned fishes belonging to the family Loricariidae, the armoured suckermouth catfishes. The catfishes in this subfamily are found in the Neotropics.

== Taxonomy ==
Rhinelepinae was originally proposed as a tribe, the Rhinelepini, because it is a well diagnosed monophyletic clade currently containing three genera: Pogonopoma, Pseudorinelepis, and Rhinelepis. When the tribe was first proposed, Pogonopomoides was a valid genus, but it is now a synonym of Pogonopoma. Pseudorinelepis is the most basal, and Rhinelepis and Pogonopoma are more derived sister groups. The subfamily is recognised by Catalog of Fishes as belonging to the Loricariidae in the suborder Loricarioidei within the catfish order Siluriformes.

== Genera ==
Rhinelepinae contains the following genera:

- Pogonopoma Regan, 1904
- Pseudorinelepis Bleeker, 1862
- Rhinelepis Agassiz, 1829

== Appearance and anatomy ==
Rhinelepinae species are generally medium to large-sized Loricariids. Rhinelepinae species are unique among Loricariidae for having a normal, circular iris as opposed to the bilobed, omega iris. These species end to have relatively thick armor plates on their bodies. In Iquitos, Peru, Pseudorinelepis genibarbis is known as carachama sin costilla, which actually means "Loricariid without ribs"; this refers to the trait that it shares with other Rhinelepini catfish; members of this tribe do not have ribs past the sixth vertebra.

One of the characters that binds this group together is a large U-shaped diverticulum of the digestive tract; this is always filled with air. The first part of the diverticulum is modified from the esophagus and consists of thick musculature; this passes a short distance before reaching the second, main, U-shaped part of the diverticulum. In Rhinelepis and Pseudorinelepis, the diverticulum functions as an accessory respiratory organ. In Rhinelepis, the diverticulum is more attached to the abdominal wall and the interior of the diverticulum is more textured. In Pogonopoma, the diverticulum is similar to a swim bladder and may be used as a hydrostatic organ; the first part of the diverticulum is greatly reduced and the second part is larger and has a smooth interior surface and less vascularized.

== Distribution ==
Rhinilepinae has an interesting biogeography and reveal information about the aquatic systems of South America. There is a split between the species that inhabit Amazon and those that inhabit the eastern river systems. Pseudorinelepis, the most basal group, is found only in the Amazon basin. Pogonopoma, is found in the Mucuri, Paraíba do Sul, and Uruguay River systems in southeastern Brazil. Rhinelepis is found in São Francisco River and Paraná River. It is also thought to have spread through to the Paraíba by a sharing of its headwaters with the Paraná in the past, which eventually got separated into two basins.

The oldest group, Pseudorinelepis, inhabits the Amazon area, while the distribution of the newer, more derived groups occurs in Southern Brazil, which is comparatively older.
