= Alexandre Pires Marceniuk =

- Education: Catholic University of Santos; University of São Paulo
- Known for: Taxonomy, phylogenetics and biogeography of marine and estuarine fishes
- Scientific career
- Fields: Ichthyology
- Workplaces: Universidade de Mogi das Cruzes

Alexandre Pires Marceniuk is a Brazilian ichthyologist and university professor.

== Career ==
Marceniuk earned a bachelor's degree in Biological Sciences from the Catholic University of Santos from 1988 to 1992 and a master's degree in Biological Sciences (Zoology) from the University of São Paulo from 1994 to 1997.

He specializes in taxonomy, phylogenetics, and biogeography of marine and estuarine fishes, particularly species in the family Ariidae.

In 2007, together with his colleague Naércio Aquino de Menezes, he described the new genus Amphiarius. The genus was established in their work:

Marceniuk, A. P. & Menezes, N. A. (2007). "Systematics of the family Ariidae (Ostariophysi, Siluriformes), with a redefinition of the genera". Zootaxa 1416: 1–126.

Marceniuk is a professor at the Universidade de Mogi das Cruzes in Mogi das Cruzes, São Paulo, Brazil.

== Taxa described by Marceniuk ==
- Amphiarius
- Ariopsis canteri
- Ariopsis jimenezi
- Carlarius

== Selected publications ==
=== Book ===
- Marceniuk, Alexandre P. & Alexandre W. S. Hilsdorf (2010). Peixes das cabeceiras do Rio Tietê e Parque das Neblinas. Bauru, São Paulo: Canal 6 Editora. ISBN 978-85-7917-130-7.

=== Articles ===
- Marceniuk, A. P., Caires, R., Siccha-Ramirez, R. & Oliveira, C. (2016). "Review of the harvestfishes, genus Peprilus (Perciformes: Stromateidae), of the Atlantic coast of South America". Zootaxa 4098 (2): 311–332. Abstract.
- Marceniuk, A. P., Marchena, J. & Betancur-R, R. (2016). "Cathorops festae (Boulenger 1898) (Siluriformes; Ariidae), a valid species from Ecuador and Peru". Zootaxa 4170 (1): 137–148. Abstract.
- Silva, W. C. d., Marceniuk, A. P., Sales, J. B. L. & Araripe, J. (2016). "Early Pleistocene lineages of Bagre bagre (Linnaeus, 1766) (Siluriformes: Ariidae), from the Atlantic coast of South America, with insights into the demography and biogeography of the species". Neotropical Ichthyology 14 (2): e150184. Full text.
- Marceniuk, A. P., Acero P., A., Cooke, R. & Betancur-R., R. (2017). "Taxonomic revision of the New World genus Ariopsis Gill (Siluriformes: Ariidae), with description of two new species". Zootaxa 4290 (1): 1–42. Abstract.
- Marceniuk, Alexandre Pires et al. (2019). "The bony fishes (Teleostei) caught by industrial trawlers off the Brazilian North coast, with insights into its conservation". Neotropical Ichthyology 17 (2): e150184, 38 pp. Full text.

== Taxonomic author abbreviation ==
The author abbreviation Marceniuk is used to indicate Alexandre Pires Marceniuk as the authority for the description and taxonomy of zoological taxa.
