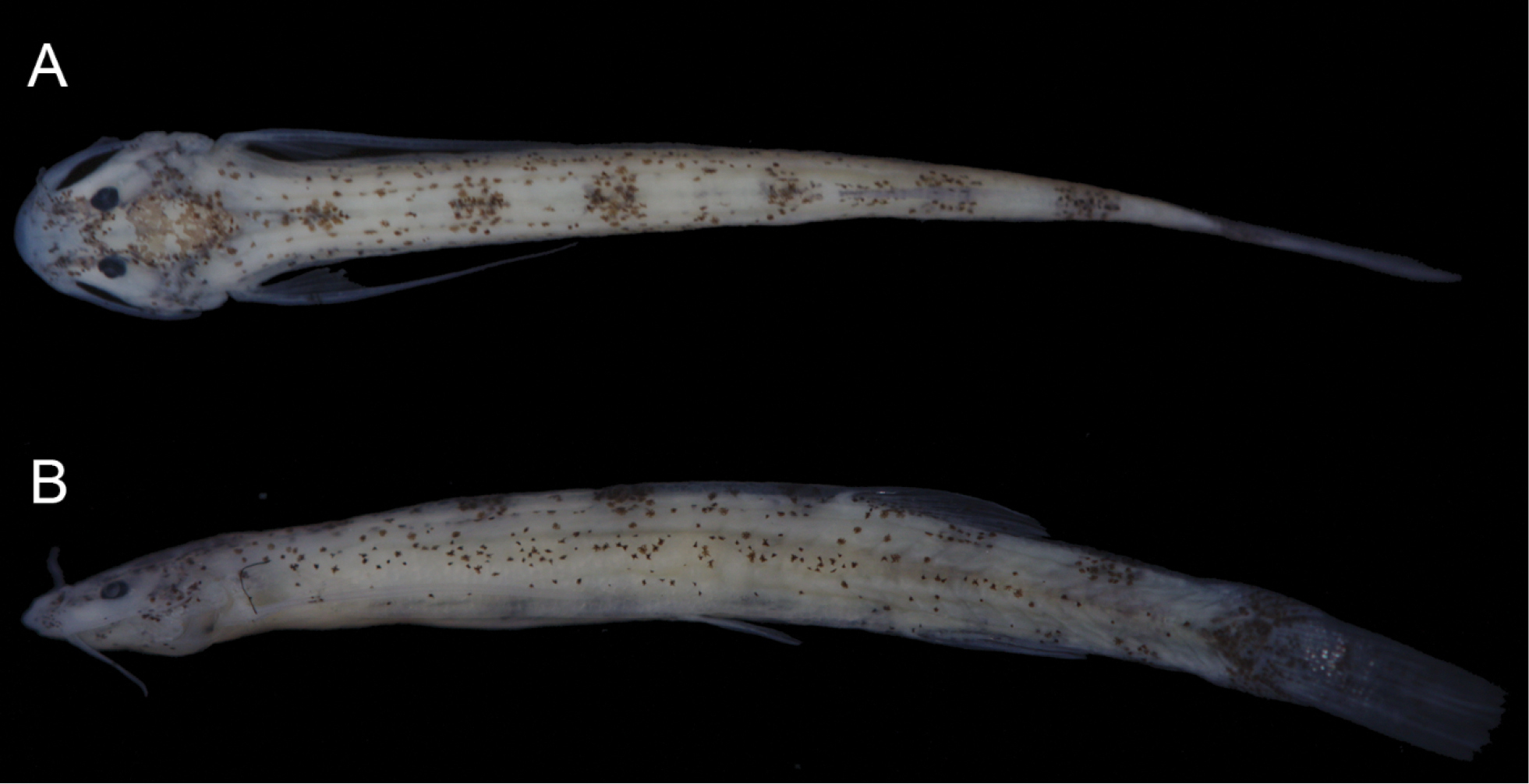

Scientific classification
- Kingdom: Animalia
- Phylum: Chordata
- Class: Actinopterygii
- Order: Siluriformes
- Family: Trichomycteridae
- Genus: Hyaloglanis
- Species: H. obliquus

Binomial name
- Hyaloglanis obliquus (Henschel, Bragança, Rangel-Pereira & W. J. E. M. Costa, 2020)

Synonyms
- Ammoglanis obliquus Henschel, Bragança, Rangel-Pereira & W. J. E. M. Costa, 2020

= Hyaloglanis obliquus =

Species of pencil catfish

Hyaloglanis obliquus is a species of freshwater ray-finned fish belonging to the family Trichomycteridae and the subfamily Glanapteryginae, the miniature pencil catfishes. This species is endemic to the Rio Preto da Eva drainage in the central Brazilian Amazon. This species reaches a length of 1.55 cm (0.61 in).

== Description ==
Hyaloglanis obliquus, a minute catfish species reaching a maximum adult size of 15.5 cm (6.1 in), is described from the Rio Preto da Eva drainage in the central Brazilian Amazon. It is distinguished from all of its congeners in possessing an exclusive combination of character states, including the presence and number of premaxillary and dentary teeth, number of interopercular and opercular odontodes, presence of cranial fontanel, number of dorsal-fin rays, number of anal-fin rays, number of caudal-fin rays, number of pelvic-fin rays, number of pectoral-fin rays, absence of pelvic splint, antorbital morphology, and absence of supraorbital and autopalatine morphology. It is considered to be a member of a clade also including Hyaloglanis pulex and Salpynx amapaensis due to the unique oral, antorbital, and autopalatine morphology. Hyaloglanis obliquus is regarded as more closely related to H. pulex than to any other congener, as both species exhibit a similar colour pattern, an absence of the metapterygoid, and the presence of two finger-like projections on the chin region.

== Distribution ==
Known only from its type locality in Rio Preto da Eva drainage, Amazonas river basin, northern Brazil.

== Etymology ==
From the Latin obliquus, meaning oblique, referring to the conspicuous diagonal banded coloration pattern of living specimens.

== Ecological notes ==
This species is known only from a small clearwater tributary of Preto da Eva river, which is a left margin tributary of the Amazonas river. Individuals were found associated with a sand-bank lying on the centre of an artificial widening of the main course, next to a road. The stream course margins were lined by gallery rainforest, and the water column was about 1 m (3 ft) deep with a weak current. The sand-bank was composed of yellow coarse sand and with a few patches of small banks of macrophytes. Capture was accomplished by scooping of the superficial layer of sand with fine hand-nets. Specimens of Potamoglanis and Ammocryptocharax were frequently captured together with Hyaloglanis obliquus. This area as a whole is under high deforestation pressure due to local human occupation.
