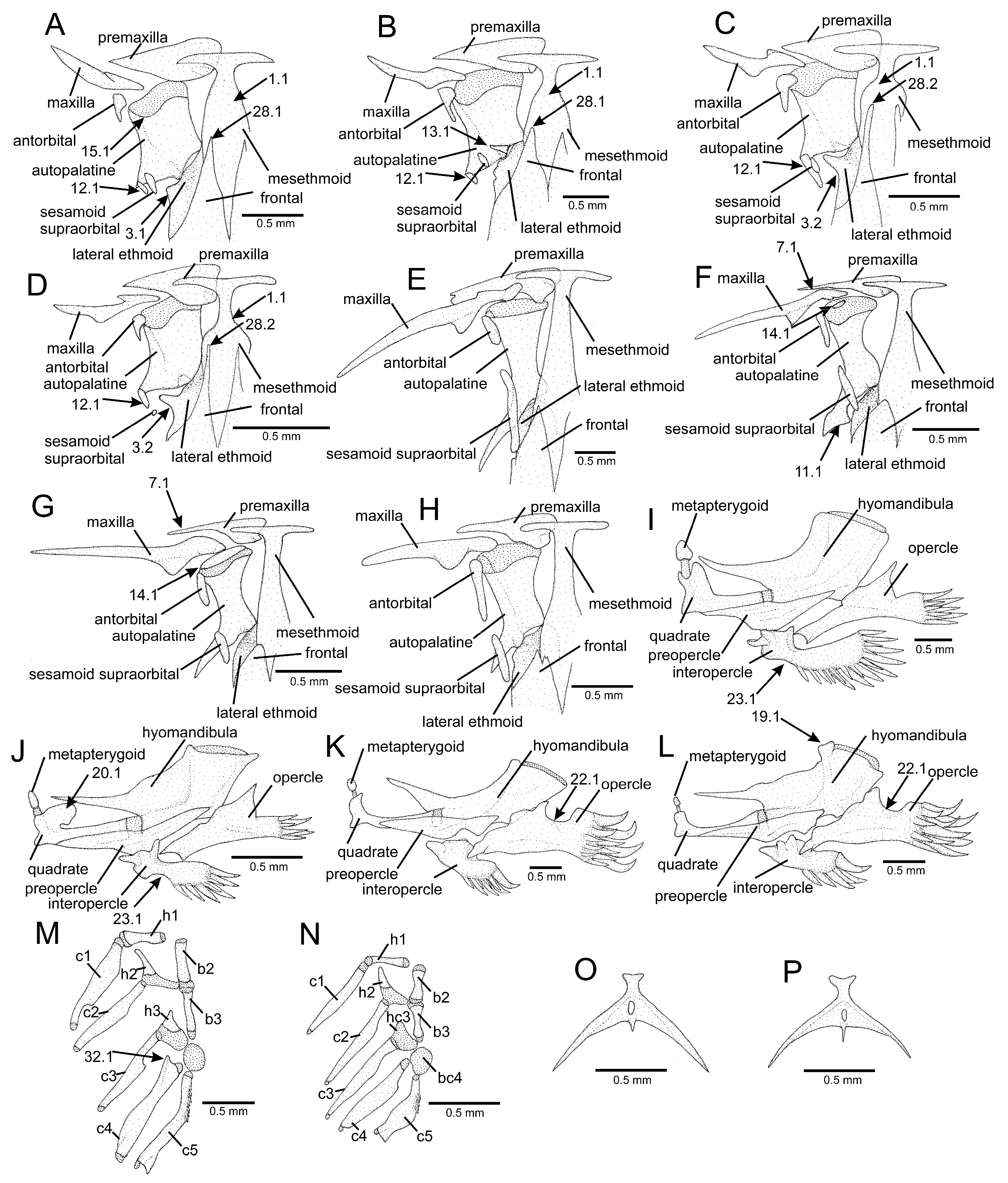
- Osteological features in the Microcambevinae: (A–H) mesethmoidal region and adjacent bones, middle and left portions, dorsal view; (I–L) left jaw suspensorium and opercular series, lateral view; (M,N) ventral branchial arch, middle and left portions, dorsal view; (O–P), parhypural, ventral view, of: (A) Listrura (Prolistrura) camposi; (B,I) Listrura (Paralistrura) tetraradiata; (C,J,N,O) Listrura (Listrura) macacuensis; (D,P) Listrura (Listrura) macaensis; (E,K) Microcambeva (Pterocambeva) ribeirae; (F) Microcambeva (Microcambeva) jucuensis; (G) Microcambeva (Microcambeva) barbata; (H,L,M) Microcambeva (Trichocambeva) filamentosa

Scientific classification
- Kingdom: Animalia
- Phylum: Chordata
- Class: Actinopterygii
- Order: Siluriformes
- Family: Trichomycteridae
- Subfamily: Glanapteryginae
- Genus: Listrura de Pinna, 1988

Type species
- Listrura nematopteryx de Pinna, 1988

Synonyms
- Paralistrura W. J. E. M. Costa & Katz, 2021; Prolistrura W. J. E. M. Costa & Katz, 2021

= Listrura =

Genus of fishes

Listrura is a genus of freshwater ray-finned fishes belonging to the family Trichomycteridae and the subfamily Glanapteryginae, the miniature pencil catfishes. The fishes in this genus are found in South America.

== Taxonomy ==
Listrura was first described in 1988 for two species from southeastern Brazil, the first record of the subfamily Glanapteryginae outside of the Amazon River basin. It was described for the species L. nematopteryx and L. camposi; L. camposi had been assigned to the genus Eremophilus, while L. nematopteryx had been misidentified as another species of Eremophilus. L. tetraradiata was described in 2002 from the Rio de Janeiro State in Brazil. L. boticario was described later in 2002 from southern Brazil. L. picinguabae was described in 2006. This genus is currently monophyletic.

With the description of L. tetraradiata in 2003, it was hypothesized that L. tetraradiata possibly constitutes the sister group to a clade comprising the only other two previously described species of Listrura, L. camposi and L. nematopteryx. As of 2006, two species of Listrura, L. camposi and L. boticario, were known only from their holotypes. The lack of osteological information for these species impedes a complete analysis of phylogenetic relationships within the genus. It was hypothesized that L. nematopteryx and L. picinguabae comprise a monophyletic assemblage, given the fact that the pectoral fin of these species consists of a single ray and the ray is in the form of a long filament, a condition not present in any other trichomycterids thus far described.

Listrura is the most basal member of the subfamily Glanapteryginae; it is sister to a clade formed by the other three genera, Glanapteryx, Pygidianops, and Typhlobelus.

== Species ==
There are currently 14 recognized species in this genus:

- Listrura bernunssa Medeiros, Donin, Ferrer, S. M. Q. Lima & de Pinna, 2024
- Listrura boticario de Pinna & Wosiacki, 2002
- Listrura camposi Miranda-Ribeiro, 1957
- Listrura costai Villa-Verde, Lazzarotto & S. M. Q. Lima, 2012
- Listrura depinnai Villa-Verde, Ferrer & L. R. Malabarba, 2014
- Listrura elongata W. J. E. M. Costa, Feltrin, Mattos, Vilardo & Katz, 2025
- Listrura gyrinura W. J. E. M. Costa, Feltrin & Katz, 2023
- Listrura macacuensis W. J. E. M. Costa & Katz, 2021
- Listrura macaensis W. J. E. M. Costa & Katz, 2021
- Listrura menezesi Villa-Verde, de Pinna, V. J. C. Reis & Oyakawa, 2022
- Listrura nematopteryx de Pinna, 1988
- Listrura picinguabae Villa-Verde & W. J. E. M. Costa, 2006
- Listrura tetraradiata Landim & W. J. E. M. Costa, 2002
- Listrura urussanga W. J. E. M. Costa, Feltrin & Katz, 2023

== Distribution ==
Listrura is endemic to small coastal river basins of southeastern Brazil. L. boticario originates from Da Figueira and Guaraqueçaba River basins, Paraná State. L. camposi inhabits the Poço Grande River, a tributary of the Juquiá River in the São Paulo State, and Ribeirão da Ilha of Florianópolis in Santa Catarina State. L. nematopteryx is distributed in the Imbariê Creek and basin of the Estrela River system of Piabetá in the Rio de Janeiro State, and Picinguaba in the São Paulo State. L. picinguabae is only known from small tributaries to the da Fazenda River in the São Paulo State. L. tetraradiata is from the Ibicuíba River of the Araruama Lagoon system.

== Description ==
The body is elongate and may be cylindrical. These fish have three pairs of barbels. The mouth is subterminal. These fish are lacking in pelvic fins. The caudal fin is rounded. The caudal skeleton is compact and fused. Listura species grow to about 3.7–4.9 cm (1.5–1.9 in) SL.

== Ecology ==
Listrura occur in shallow-water leaf-litter deposits underlain by mud or deeper layers of leaf litter. Listrura inhabits extremely small, shallow, and temporary water bodies, marginal to main water courses covered with vegetation; no species of Listrura is known to occur in creeks or rivers, except apparently as stray or colonizing specimens. L. picinguabae inhabits narrow and shallow (about 20 cm or 7.9 in deep) streams in dense tropical forest; it is encountered buried in the litter bottom. L. tetraradiata has been found in small, clear water forest streams; these habitats are shallow (about 40 cm or 16 in deep), with large rocks on the banks and gravel and sand on the bottom. L. tetraradiata has been found to have copepods, insect larvae, and mites in their stomach contents.
