= Glanapteryx =

Scientific classification
- Kingdom: Animalia
- Phylum: Chordata
- Class: Actinopterygii
- Order: Siluriformes
- Family: Trichomycteridae
- Subfamily: Glanapteryginae
- Genus: Glanapteryx; Myers, 1927

Type species
- Glanapteryx anguilla Myers, 1927

Genus of fishes

Glanapteryx is a genus of freshwater ray-finned fishes belonging to the family Trichomycteridae and the subfamily Glanapteryginae, the miniature pencil catfishes. These fishes are found in South America.

== Taxonomy ==
Glanapteryx is a monophyletic genus. Glanapteryx has been proposed as the sister group to a clade composed of Pygidianops and Typhlobelus, with Listrura the sister group to those three.

== Species ==
There are currently two recognized species in this genus:

- Glanapteryx anguilla Myers, 1927
- Glanapteryx niobium de Pinna, 1998

== Distribution and habitat ==
G. anguilla originates from the Negro and Orinoco River basins of Brazil and Venezuela, growing to a length of about 6.1 centimetres (2.4 in) TL. G. niobium reaches about 5.5 cm (2.2 in). These species lack an anal fin.

Glanapteryx anguilla has been found in small forest streams with sandy substrate covered by leaf litter.
