= Salpynx ix =

Conservation status
- Least Concern (IUCN 3.1)

Scientific classification
- Kingdom: Animalia
- Phylum: Chordata
- Class: Actinopterygii
- Order: Siluriformes
- Family: Trichomycteridae
- Genus: Salpynx
- Species: S. ix

Binomial name
- Salpynx ix (Wosiacki, Montag and Coutinho, 2011)

Synonyms
- Stenolicmus ix Wosiacki, Coutinho & de Assis Montag, 2011

Species of fish

Salpynx ix is a species of catfish in the family Trichomycteridae, also called the Pencil or Parasitic Catfishes. It was described from the Curuá River, in the Brazilian state of Pará, which is part of the Amazon River basin.

== Taxonomy ==
Salpynx ix was first formally described as Stenolicmus ix in 2011 by Wolmar Benjamin Wosiacki, Luciano Fogaça de Assis Montag and Daniel Pires Coutinho with its type locality given as a tributary of Igarapé Curuá, a left tributary of the Amazon River. In 2025 Mario de Pinna, Vinicius José Carvalho Reis and Carlos DoNascimiento proposed the new genus Salpynx, describing two new species and reclassifying two others, S. ix and S. amapaensis in the new genus. This genus is classified in the subfamily Glanapteryginae, the miniature pencil catfishes, in the family Trichomycteridae, the pencil and parasitic catfishes.

== Etymology ==
Salpynx ix is a member of the genus Salpynx, this name is based on that of a brass, trumpet like instrument in Ancient Greece, the salpinx, with a y replacing the i to prevent confusion with the term salpinx tube used in anatomy. This is an allusion to the type locality of the type species of the genus, S. trombetensis, the Rio Trombetas, the "trumpet river" in Portuguese . The specific name, ix, is Mayan for "jaguar", a reference to the grouped pattern of blotches on the skin of this fish.

== Description ==
Salpynx ix is physically similar to Stenolicmus sarmientoi, with which it was formerly considered to be congeneric. The head of this species is relatively small, and more dorso-ventrally compressed than the body, the overall dorsal surface of which is flat. Its branchial membranes are united to the isthmus, and its gill openings are unconstricted. The eyes, which sit dorso-laterally on the head, are small, with well-defined margins and distinct, integument-covered lenses. The posterior naris is round in shape, and similar in size to the eyes.

The coloration of this species is mostly a uniform tan or cream that lightens somewhat ventrally. The spots, from which the species was named, are present on the dorsal surface and appear as dark brown, irregular blotches.

== Distribution and habitat ==
Salpynx ix is only known from its type locality, which is an unnamed tributary of the Rio Curuá in the lower Amazon basin near Alenquer, Pará State, Brazil. The holotype of this species was collected from a lotic area in a small stream which was approximately 5 m (16 ft) wide and less than 1 m (3 ft) deep. The margins of the stream were dominated by amphibious vegetation and a large amount of leaf litter was present on the bottom of the stream, though the fish itself is thought to dwell in the sand. S. ix was found to co-occur with 15 other species of fishes from orders such as the Characiformes, Perciformes, and other catfishes (Siluriformes).
