= Ammoglanis =

Scientific classification
- Kingdom: Animalia
- Phylum: Chordata
- Class: Actinopterygii
- Order: Siluriformes
- Family: Trichomycteridae
- Subfamily: Sarcoglanidinae
- Genus: Ammoglanis; Costa, 1994

Type species
- Ammoglanis diaphanus Costa, 1994

Species
- 2, see text.

Genus of fishes

Ammoglanis is a genus of pencil catfishes native to South America.

== Taxonomy ==
The relationships of the genus Ammoglanis are unknown; it is thought that this genus along with undescribed forms are the sister group to a large intrafamilial clade composed of several genera and subfamilies. In the interim, this genus is included within Sarcoglanidinae. Species formerly included here have been moved to Hyaloglanis and Salpynx.

== Species ==
There are currently two recognized species in this genus:

- Ammoglanis diaphanus Costa, 1994
- Ammoglanis multidentatus Costa, Mattos & Santos, 2019

== Distribution ==
A. diaphanus originates from a stream tributary to the Javaés River of the Araguaia River basin in Tocantins, Brazil. A. multidentatus originates from the Rio São José drainage, upper Rio Paraguaçu basin, Bahia State (Brazil).

== Description ==
Ammoglanis species grow to about 1.5–1.9 centimetres (0.59–0.75 in) SL.

== Ecology ==
A. diaphanus inhabits shallow, narrow, clear water, moderately swift-flowing stream and is found buried in the sand. It feeds on Diptera larvae and cladocerans.
