= Pygidianops amphioxus =

Scientific classification
- Kingdom: Animalia
- Phylum: Chordata
- Class: Actinopterygii
- Division: Teleostei
- Order: Siluriformes
- Family: Trichomycteridae
- Genus: Pygidianops
- Species: P. amphioxus

Binomial name
- Pygidianops amphioxus de Pinna & Kirovsky, 2011

Species of fish

Pygidianops amphioxus is a species of miniature pencil catfish found in fast flowing streams located within the Amazon basin in Brazil. These fish, like others that spend a large amount of time under substrate, almost entirely lack pigment. Unlike their close relatives, P. amphioxus is very fossorial, spending all of its time quickly swimming under the sand. Based on gut contents, the fish feed on a mix of fly larvae and copepods. Based on their anatomy, it has been suggested that these fish reproduce by internal fertilization. This is rare among catfish and is the first time it was recorded amount members of its family.

== Taxonomy ==
The first specimens assigned to Pygidianops amphioxus were collected in Adolfo Ducke Forest Reserve; more were later found at a few other localities within the lower Amazon and Rio Negro basins, all in Brazil. Before the proper description of the species, individuals now assigned to it were mentioned in a few papers such as a 2005 study of fish communities in Central Amazonian streams by Fernando P. Mendonça and coauthors. In 2010, it was also he main focus of a masters thesis by Marla Soares Carvalho. In 2011, the species was named by Mário C. C. de Pinna and Alexandre L. Kirovsky. The specific name "amphioxus" is in reference to the cephalochordate of the same name due to their superficial similarities in body shape.

== Description ==
Pygidianops amphioxus is a strange catfish compared to other members of the genus in body morphology. P. amphioxus is a small catfish with a maximum body length of slightly over 35 millimetres (1.4 in). Rather than being simply elongate as in P. cuao and other species, the body of P. amphioxus has been described as eel-like. Throughout the length of the body, the depth of the body stays consistently thin. While the cross section of the body anteriorly is rounded, it becomes more compressed towards the back. While the head is fairly elongate proportionally, it is still small: only making up 10-12% of the standard length. The head is the widest at the front and is dorsally almost trapezoidal in shape. Three pairs of barbels with blunt ends are present, each being about half the length of the head. The frontmost or maxillary barbels point foreword in life. The other two pairs, being the nasal and rictal barbels, are located near the eyes and mouth respectively. Both pairs of nostrils are simple, lacking occlusion valves. The nostrils on each side are connected by a sinusoidal ridge which forms a small lobe between them. The eyes of P. amphioxus are located dorsally just behind the posterior nostril, at about the half way point of the head. They are small and directed anterolaterally. Towards the back of the head, there are a total of five latero-sensory pores which are associated with the infraorbital pore, preopercular canal and lateral line.

The pectoral fins of P. amphioxus are very reduced, being made up of just a single fin ray and resulting in them looking very similar to the catfish's barbels. The only other fin on the fish is the caudal fin which is continuous with the profile of the body. It is made up of between 11 and 13 unbranched fin rays. Though the fish look delicate, they have been described as being fairly tough when being touched.

=== Coloration ===
As in other burrowing fish, the pigmentation of P. amphioxus is reduced with the body mainly being a light pink in life. Largely, the only color on the head comes from dark brain pigments which create a web-like pattern. The small eyes of the fish are also very dark. Postcranially, two faint dark lines made up of scattered chromatophores run along the length of the dorsal fin-fold. Some dark pigments are also present on the pectoral fins. This coloration results in the fish becoming nearly invisible when on the sandy bottom of streams. Even the dark eyes are only visible only when seen very close up.

=== Sexual dimorphism ===
Sexual dimorphism is not apparent with the main differences being in body length and reproductive anatomy. Females on average are slightly larger than males with the males studied being 25–29 millimetres (0.98–1.14 in) and females being over 29 millimetres (1.1 in). The genital papilla, forming a tube behind the anus, are also sexually dimorphic. While they are they are triangular in males, they are pleated in females. This differenced is very distinct compared to most other catfish and is usually associated with internal fertilization. This would make P. amphioxus the first member of Trichomycteridae known to use this reproductive strategy.

== Habitat and distribution ==
Pygidianops amphioxus has a large range compared to other members of Glanapteryginae, being found along a straight line measuring 900 kilometres (560 mi) from its easternmost to westernmost occurrence; the species ranges from the Rio Daraá (a tributary of the upper Rio Negro) to the Rio Nhamundá (a tributary of the Amazon). All known individuals of the fish have been found in lowland "terra firme" streams. These bodies of water are located in the middle of forests with streambeds made up of sand and some larger rocks that form small waterfalls. Leaf litter is present in some areas of the stream though it is uncommon. These streams are on average 70 centimetres (28 in) deep though some areas can be up to 2.5 metres (8.2 ft). Dense vegetation is found on the banks of these streams.

== Ecology ==
Pygidianops amphioxus has been found in the sandy, shaded areas of clear streams where the water is fast flowing. Though their distribution appears scattered, they are found most commonly in sandy areas that are either at a sharp turn in the stream or just under a waterfall. These fish remain under sand even when awake, being more fossorial than closely related species that are believed to burrow only when escaping predators. The diet of P. amphioxus is largely made up of invertebrates, such as nonbiting-midge larvae and harpacticoidan copepods, that also live in the sand (psammon). This diet also results in the accidental consumption of sand grains and detritus. It has been suggested that the catfish find their prey by chemically sensing them as in some cave catfish. Once close, the prey is most likely captured by suction feeding. Unlike what is expected of a burrowing animal, it has been noted by researchers that the fish move very fast through the sand. This extends to moving into the sand as well with them being described as "diving" into the substrate.
