= Hyaloglanis natgeorum =

Scientific classification
- Kingdom: Animalia
- Phylum: Chordata
- Class: Actinopterygii
- Order: Siluriformes
- Family: Trichomycteridae
- Genus: Hyaloglanis
- Species: H. natgeorum

Binomial name
- Hyaloglanis natgeorum (Henschel, Lujan & Baskin, 2020)

Synonyms
- Ammoglanis natgeorum Henschel, Lujan & Baskin, 2020

Species of pencil catfish

Hyaloglanis natgeorum is a species of freshwater ray-finned fish belonging to the family Trichomycteridae and the subfamily Glanapteryginae, the miniature pencil catfishes. This species was described from a marginal habitat of the lower Atabapo River, which is a left-bank blackwater tributary of the upper Orinoco River in Amazonas, Venezuela.
