= Hyaloglanis =

Scientific classification
- Kingdom: Animalia
- Phylum: Chordata
- Class: Actinopterygii
- Order: Siluriformes
- Family: Trichomycteridae
- Subfamily: Glanapteryginae
- Genus: Hyaloglanis de Pinna, V. J. C. Reis & DoNascimiento, 2025, 2025

Type species
- Ammoglanis pulex de Pinna & Winemiller, 2000

Species
- 4, see text.

Genus of fishes

Hyaloglanis is a genus of freshwater ray-finned fishes belonging to the family Trichomycteridae and the subfamily Glanapteryginae, the miniature pencil catfishes. These fishes are found in South America.

== Taxonomy ==
The phylogenetic position of H. pulex is problematic. It seems to be closely related to Ammoglanis diaphanus due to some derived characters of the internal anatomy, but a conclusive assessment of its relationships has been prevented by its paedomorphic features and scarcity of study material. This generic placement seems to be well supported.

== Species ==
There are currently four recognized species in this genus:

- Hyaloglanis natgeorum Henschel, Lujan & Baskin, 2020
- Hyaloglanis nheengatu (Canto, Hercos & Ribeiro, 2022)
- Hyaloglanis obliquus Henschel, Bragança, Rangel-Pereira & W. J. E. M. Costa, 2020
- Hyaloglanis pulex (de Pinna & Winemiller, 2000)

== Distribution ==
H. pulex originates from the Paria Grande River, the Pamoni River, and Caño Garrapata of Venezuela. H. obliquus is only known from the Rio Preta da Eva drainage basin.

== Description ==
Hyaloglanis species are mostly transparent "glass" fish, with a mostly hyaline body, which is reflected in the generic name. They grow to about 1.5–1.9 centimetres (0.59–0.75 inches) SL. H. pulex is among the smallest known vertebrates. H. pulex can be distinguished from A. diaphanus by a number of characteristics, including the presence of a faint pattern of eight bands formed by internal chromatophores and the lack of teeth.

== Ecology ==
H. pulex is found in sand banks near the shorelines of clear water and slightly tea-stained streams. Apparently fossorial by daylight, it is found buried in coarse clear sand at the stream edge, in areas shaded by dense tropical rainforest. The waters are with slow current, pH varying between 5.5–6.2, and temperature between 27.5–28 °C (81.5–82.4 °F). H. pulex is thought to feed on microscopic fauna like protozoa, rotifers, and nematodes since it inhabits interstitial spaces among sand grains in nutrient-poor, clear-water and backwater streams.
