= Malacoglanis =

Conservation status
- Least Concern (IUCN 3.1)

Scientific classification
- Kingdom: Animalia
- Phylum: Chordata
- Class: Actinopterygii
- Order: Siluriformes
- Family: Trichomycteridae
- Subfamily: Sarcoglanidinae
- Genus: Malacoglanis; Myers & Weitzman, 1966
- Species: M. gelatinosus

Binomial name
- Malacoglanis gelatinosus Myers & Weitzman, 1966

Monotypic genus of fish

Malacoglanis is a monospecific genus of freshwater ray-finned fish belonging to the family Trichomycteridae and the subfamily Sarcoglanidinae, the psammmophilic catfishes, the only species in the genus is Malacoglanis gelatinosus. This fish grows to about 2 centimetres (0.79 in) SL. and is native to the Caquetá River basin of Colombia. Stauroglanis is the sister group to a monophyletic group formed by Malacoglanis and Sarcoglanis.
