= Microcambeva =

Scientific classification
- Kingdom: Animalia
- Phylum: Chordata
- Class: Actinopterygii
- Order: Siluriformes
- Family: Trichomycteridae
- Subfamily: Sarcoglanidinae
- Genus: Microcambeva; Costa & Bockmann, 1994

Type species
- Microcambeva barbata Costa & Bockman, 1994

Species
- 9, see text.

Synonyms
- Pterocambeva (subgenus of Microcambeva) Costa & Katz, 2021; Trichocambeva (subgenus of Microcambeva) Costa & Katz, 2021

Genus of fishes

Microcambeva is a genus of catfishes (order Siluriformes) of the family Trichomycteridae.

== Species ==
There are currently nine recognized species in this genus:

- Microcambeva barbata W. Costa & Bockmann, 1994
- Microcambeva bendego Medeiros, Moreira, de Pinna & S. M. Q. Lima, 2020
- Microcambeva draco Mattos & S. M. Q. Lima, 2010
- Microcambeva filamentosa W. Costa, Katz & Vilardo, 2020
- Microcambeva jucuensis W. Costa, Katz, Mattos & Rangel-Pereira, 2019
- Microcambeva mucuriensis W. Costa, Katz, Mattos & Rangel-Pereira, 2019
- Microcambeva ribeirae W. Costa, S. M. Q. Lima & Bizerril, 2004
- Microcambeva watu Medeiros, Sarmento-Soares & S. M. Q. Lima, 2021

== Distribution ==
Microcambeva is thought to be widespread along coastal basins of southern, southeastern, and eastern Brazil. M. barbata originates from Atlantic coastal drainages of Rio de Janeiro and Espírito Santo states in Brazil. M. ribeirae originates from the Ribeira do Iguape River basin of southeastern Brazil. Two undescribed species of Microcambeva are known from the Doce River basin in Minas Gerais state and Jucuruçu River in Bahia state.

== Description ==
The two currently described species of Microcambeva have similar general morphology. M. ribeirae has a maximum recorded length of 4.8 centimetres (1.9 in) SL. M. ribeirae is distinguished from M. barbata by a series of morphological features, including the extent of the nasal barbels (to the nostril instead of the eye), the position of the eye (posterior half of head instead of on central portion), the first pectoral fin ray being shorter than the posterior ones (instead of the first ray being elongate and forming a prominent filament), the anal fin origin behind the vertical through the base of the last dorsal fin rays (instead of at this vertical), and others.

== Habitat ==
M. ribeirae has been found in clear, shallow streams (about 60 cm or 24 in deep) with a gray, sandy bottom in which the specimens were found entirely buried except for snout and barbels.
