= Sarcoglanis =

Conservation status
- Least Concern (IUCN 3.1)

Scientific classification
- Kingdom: Animalia
- Phylum: Chordata
- Class: Actinopterygii
- Order: Siluriformes
- Family: Trichomycteridae
- Subfamily: Sarcoglanidinae
- Genus: Sarcoglanis; Myers & Weitzman, 1966
- Species: S. simplex

Binomial name
- Sarcoglanis simplex Myers & Weitzman, 1966

Species of fish

Sarcoglanis is a monospecific genus of freshwater ray-finned fish belonging to the family Trichomycteridae and the subfamily Sarcoglanidinae, the psammmophilic catfishes, the only species in the genus is Sarcoglanis simplex. This fish originates from the upper Rio Negro basin of Brazil. Stauroglanis is the sister group to a monophyletic group formed by Malacoglanis and Sarcoglanis.
