= Ammocryptocharax vintonae =

Conservation status
- Least Concern (IUCN 3.1)

Scientific classification
- Kingdom: Animalia
- Phylum: Chordata
- Class: Actinopterygii
- Order: Characiformes
- Family: Crenuchidae
- Genus: Ammocryptocharax
- Species: A. vintonae

Binomial name
- Ammocryptocharax vintonae C. H. Eigenmann, 1909

Synonyms
- Ammochryptocharax vintonae Eigenmann, 1919; Characidium vintoni Eigenmann, 1909; Klausewitzia vintoni Eigenmann, 1909

Species of fish

Ammocryptocharax vintonae is a species of freshwater fish in the South American darter family (Crenuchidae) of the order Characiformes. It is found in several rivers in Guyana and Venezuela.

== Taxonomy ==
Ammocryptocharax vintonae was first described by Carl H. Eigenmann in 1909. It has also been referred to by the synonyms Ammochryptocharax vintonae, Characidium vintoni, and Klausewitzia vintoni. It is classified in the Crenuchidae family (the South American darters) in the order Characiformes. The holotype was collected from Shrimp Creek, Guyana.

== Ecology ==
A. vintonae occurs in Guyana and Venezuela, in the upper basins of the Caroní and Essequibo rivers. It is also found in the Potaro River and Mazaruni River. Canaima National Park is within its range.

This species prefers clear or black water, fast currents, and rocky substrates with a pH of 6.0–7.0 and a temperature of 23 °C (73 °F)–27 °C (81 °F). It grows up to 9.0 centimetres (3.5 in) in standard length.

The fish is assessed as a least concern species on the IUCN Red List due to its wide distribution. However, it is considered rare in its range, and its population is threatened by deforestation, mining, and pollution.
