= Ammoglanis diaphanus =

Conservation status
- Data Deficient (IUCN 3.1)

Scientific classification
- Kingdom: Animalia
- Phylum: Chordata
- Class: Actinopterygii
- Order: Siluriformes
- Family: Trichomycteridae
- Genus: Ammoglanis
- Species: A. diaphanus

Binomial name
- Ammoglanis diaphanus W. Costa, 1994

Species of pencil catfish

Ammoglanis diaphanus is a species of freshwater ray-finned fish belonging to the family Trichomycteridae and the subfamily Sarcoglanidinae, the psammmophilic catfishes. This catfish was described from a type locality of a stream which is tributary to the Javaés River, in the Araguaia River basin in Brazil. This species is now known to be found in the Araguaia and Tocantins riversystems in the states of Goias, Matto Grosso and Tocantins. This species reaches a length of 1.9 cm (0.75 in).
