= Ammocryptocharax elegans =

Conservation status
- Least Concern (IUCN 3.1)

Scientific classification
- Kingdom: Animalia
- Phylum: Chordata
- Class: Actinopterygii
- Order: Characiformes
- Family: Crenuchidae
- Genus: Ammocryptocharax
- Species: A. elegans

Binomial name
- Ammocryptocharax elegans Weitzman & Kanazawa, 1976

Species of fish

Ammocryptocharax elegans is a species of freshwater ray-finned fish belonging to the family Crenuchidae, the South American darters. This species was described in 1976 by Stanley Howard Weitzman and Robert H. Kanazawa, who proposed the new genus Ammocryptocharax for this species, designating this species as the type species of that genus. This species is found in the catchment of the Amazon in Brazil, Bolivia and Peru and in the upper Orinoco in Venezuela and Colombia.
