= Hyaloglanis pulex =

Conservation status
- Least Concern (IUCN 3.1)

Scientific classification
- Kingdom: Animalia
- Phylum: Chordata
- Class: Actinopterygii
- Order: Siluriformes
- Family: Trichomycteridae
- Genus: Hyaloglanis
- Species: H. pulex

Binomial name
- Hyaloglanis pulex (de Pinna & Winemiller, 2000)

Synonyms
- Ammoglanis pulex de Pinna & Winemiller, 2000

Species of pencil catfish

Hyaloglanis pulex is a species of freshwater ray-finned fish belonging to the family Trichomycteridae and the subfamily Glanapteryginae, the miniature pencil catfishes. This species is found in the Paria Grande River, the Pamoni River, and the Caño Garrapata in Venezuela. This species reaches a length of 1.5 cm (0.59 in).
