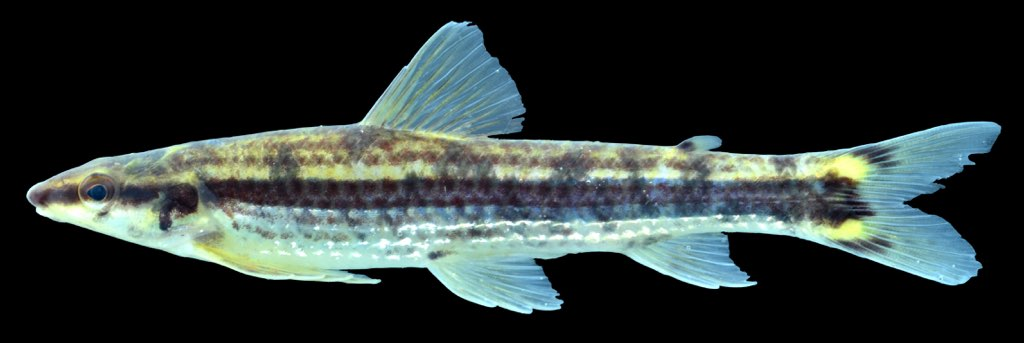

Conservation status
- Least Concern (IUCN 3.1)

Scientific classification
- Kingdom: Animalia
- Phylum: Chordata
- Class: Actinopterygii
- Order: Characiformes
- Family: Crenuchidae
- Genus: Ammocryptocharax
- Species: A. lateralis

Binomial name
- Ammocryptocharax lateralis C. H. Eigenmann, 1909

Synonyms
- Characidium laterale Eigenmann, 1909

= Ammocryptocharax lateralis =

Species of fish

Ammocryptocharax lateralis is a species of freshwater fish in the South American darter family (Crenuchidae) of the order Characiformes. It is found in multiple river basins in Guyana.

== Taxonomy ==
Ammocryptocharax lateralis was first described by Carl H. Eigenmann in 1909 under the basionym Characidium laterale. It is classified in the Crenuchidae family (the South American darters) in the order Characiformes.

== Ecology ==
Ammocryptocharax lateralis is found only in Guyana. It occurs in the Potaro River and Mazaruni River drainages of the Essequibo River basin, the Demerara River basin, and the Berbice River basin, with a type locality of Amatuk Falls in the Potaro River. It is found in rapids and near waterfalls, preferring clear or tea-colored water with rocky, gravelly, or sandy substrates and areas populated with plants of the Podostemaceae family. It grows up to 2.8 centimetres (1.1 in) in standard length.

Its habitat is threatened by gold mining. It may also be used in the aquarium trade. However, it is assessed as a least concern species on the IUCN Red List due to its widespread occurrence in Guyana. Its population is believed to be stable and is estimated to be no lower than 10,000 individuals, but as the nature of its rapids habitat makes it difficult to study, both its numbers and distribution may be underestimated.
