= Stauroglanis =

Conservation status
- Least Concern (IUCN 3.1)

Scientific classification
- Kingdom: Animalia
- Phylum: Chordata
- Class: Actinopterygii
- Order: Siluriformes
- Family: Trichomycteridae
- Subfamily: Sarcoglanidinae
- Genus: Stauroglanis de Pinna, 1989
- Species: S. gouldingi

Binomial name
- Stauroglanis gouldingi de Pinna, 1989

Species of fish

Stauroglanis is a monospecific genus of freshwater ray-finned fish belonging to the family Trichomycteridae and the subfamily Sarcoglanidinae, the psammmophilic catfishes, the only species in the genus is Stauroglanis gouldingi.

== Taxonomy ==
Stauroglanis was described as a new genus, and S. gouldingi as a new species by Mario C. C. de Pinna, in 1989. Stauroglanis is the sister group to a monophyletic group formed by Malacoglanis and Sarcoglanis. These genera, among others, are part of the subfamily Sarcoglanidinae.

== Distribution ==
This species is known from the Daraá River of the Rio Negro basin in Brazil.

== Description ==
In S. gouldingi, the eyes are large and conspicuous, the nasal barbels are present but very short, the snout region of the head is elongate, and the mouth subterminal and not suckerlike. It has an elongate body. The integument is very thin and transparent, and superficial muscles and some other internal structures are readily visible. This species grows to about 2.7 centimetres (1.1 in) SL. S. gouldingi has certain skeletal paedomorphic characteristics.

== Ecology ==
During the day, S. gouldingi is found on patches of loose sand where the water flow forms ephemeral sand ripples. This species is a mostly visually oriented microcarnivore, foraging on immature aquatic insects. One foraging tactic of the species is movement along the ripple grooves while scanning the bottom back and forth, alternating between adjacent grooves. Feeding activity peaks at late morning and afternoon. When disturbed, S. gouldingi buries in the sand, and at night it remains completely buried. Seasonal reproduction has been indicated in the wet months, whereas no reproductive individuals have been found in the dry months.

The expansion of unpaved roads and the removal of riparian vegetation degrade forest stream dynamics and the ephemeral microhabitat of S. gouldingi, which may result in its local extirpation.
