= Salpynx amapaensis =

Conservation status
- Least Concern (IUCN 3.1)

Scientific classification
- Kingdom: Animalia
- Phylum: Chordata
- Class: Actinopterygii
- Order: Siluriformes
- Family: Trichomycteridae
- Genus: Salpynx
- Species: S. amapaensis

Binomial name
- Salpynx amapaensis (Mattos, W. J. E. M. Costa & Gama, 2008)

Synonyms
- Ammoglanis amapaensis Mattos, W. J. E. M. Costa & Gama, 2008

Species of pencil catfish

Salpynx amapaensis is a species of freshwater ray-finned fish belonging to the family Trichomycteridae and the subfamily Glanapteryginae, the miniature pencil catfishes. This catfish is found in the Rio Mapaoni, of the Rio Jari basin, in the Município Serra do Navio, at the Parque Nacional Montanhas do Tumucumaque, with a GPS coordinate of 2°11'39"N, 54°35'16"W, in the Estado do Amapá, Brazil. This species reaches a length of 1.8 cm (0.71 in).
