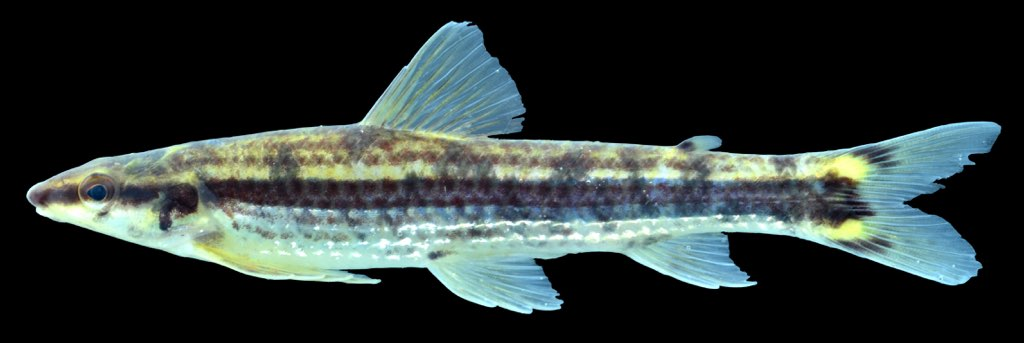
- Ammocryptocharax lateralis

Scientific classification
- Kingdom: Animalia
- Phylum: Chordata
- Class: Actinopterygii
- Order: Characiformes
- Family: Crenuchidae
- Subfamily: Characidiinae
- Genus: Ammocryptocharax; Weitzman & Kanazawa, 1976

Type species
- Ammocryptocharax elegans Weitzman & Kanazawa, 1976

= Ammocryptocharax =

Genus of fishes

Ammocryptocharax is a genus of freshwater ray-finned fishes belonging to the family Crenuchidae, the South American darters. These fishes are found in South America.

== Species ==
Ammocryptocharax contains the following species:

- Ammocryptocharax elegans Weitzman & Kanazawa, 1976
- Ammocryptocharax lateralis (C. H. Eigenmann, 1909)
- Ammocryptocharax minutus Buckup, 1993
- Ammocryptocharax vintonae (Eigenmann, 1909)
