= Sarcoglanidinae =

Scientific classification
- Kingdom: Animalia
- Phylum: Chordata
- Class: Actinopterygii
- Order: Siluriformes
- Family: Trichomycteridae
- Subfamily: Sarcoglanidinae; Myers & Weitzman, 1966

Type genus
- Sarcoglanis Myers & Weitzman, 1966

Genera
- see text

Subfamily of fishes

The Sarcoglanidinae, the psammmophilic catfishes, are a subfamily of freshwater ray-finned fishes belonging to family Trichomycteridae, the pencil catfishes and the parasitic catfishes. These catfishes are found in South America.

== Taxonomy ==
The subfamily Sarcoglanidinae was first established in 1966 for Sarcoglanis simplex and Malacoglanis gelatinosus. A third species of the subfamily – Stauroglanis gouldingi, was described about 25 years later. Descriptions of additional species have followed, though most genera remain monotypic. The relationships of the genus Ammoglanis with other sarcoglanidines are not well-established; however, this genus is currently included within Sarcoglanidinae.

This subfamily has been proposed to have a sister group relationship to Glanapteryginae. Like the members of this subfamily, many glanapterygines are sand-dwelling fish.

=== Genera ===
Sarcoglanidinae contains the following valid genera:

- Ammoglanis W. Costa, 1994
- Malacoglanis Myers & Weitzman, 1966
- Microcambeva W. Costa & Bockmann, 1994
- Sarcoglanis Myers & Weitzman, 1966
- Stauroglanis de Pinna, 1989
- Stenolicmus de Pinna & Starnes, 1990

== Distribution and habitat ==
All genera are endemic to the Amazon River system. Despite their scarcity in museum collections, sarcoglanidines possibly occur throughout the entire Amazon and the Orinoco basins.

Sarcoglanidines usually live in sandy banks of rivers and streams, feeding on minute arthropods.

== Description ==
Sarcoglanidines are all very small (to the extent of some species being considered 'miniaturized'), usually not exceeding 25 mm (1.0 in) in standard length (SL). Microcambeva ribeirae on the other hand, is the largest species, reaching 48 mm (1.9 in) SL. All except one species are poorly pigmented, with a translucent body in life. The three pairs of barbels present in other trichomycterids are also present in these fish, though nasal barbels tend to be reduced. In addition, some taxa have barbel-like structures on the ventral surface of their heads. Sarcoglanis simplex and Malacoglanis gelatinosus possess an uncommonly deep body, a hypertrophied sac-like adipose organ above the pectoral fin, and the absence of premaxillary teeth. These two species, along with Stauroglanis gouldingi, have few or no opercular and interopercular odontodes.

The subfamily has been characterized, among other things, by a toothless upper jaw, the presence of an adipose-like fin, and the pectoral-fin rays projecting beyond the fin membrane.
