= Salpynx =

Scientific classification
- Kingdom: Animalia
- Phylum: Chordata
- Class: Actinopterygii
- Order: Siluriformes
- Family: Trichomycteridae
- Subfamily: Glanapteryginae
- Genus: Salpynx de Pinna, V. J. C. Reis & DoNascimiento, 2025

Type species
- Salpynx trombetensis de Pinna, Reis & DoNascimiento, 2025

Species
- see text

Genus of fishes

Salpynx is a genus of freshwater ray-finned fishes belonging to the family Trichomycteridae and the subfamily Glanapteryginae, the miniature pencil catfishes. The catfishes in this genus are found in South America.

== Species ==
Salpynx contains the following valid species:

- Salpynx amapaensis (Mattos, W. J. E. M. Costa & Gama, 2008)
- Salpynx ephebus de Pinna, V. J. C. Reis & DoNascimiento, 2025
- Salpynx ix (Wosiacki, Coutinho & de Assis Montag, 2011)
- Salpynx trombetensis de Pinna, Reis & DoNascimiento 2025
