= Stenolicmus =

Conservation status
- Data Deficient (IUCN 3.1)

Scientific classification
- Kingdom: Animalia
- Phylum: Chordata
- Class: Actinopterygii
- Order: Siluriformes
- Family: Trichomycteridae
- Subfamily: Sarcoglanidinae
- Genus: Stenolicmus de Pinna & Starnes, 1990
- Species: S. sarmientoi

Binomial name
- Stenolicmus sarmientoi De Pinna & Starnes, 1990

Species of fish

Stenolicmus is a monospecific genus of freshwater ray-finned fish belonging to the family Trichomycteridae and the subfamily Sarcoglanidinae, the psammmophilic catfishes, the only species in the genus is Stenolicmus sarmientoi, a species endemic to Bolivia where it is found in the upper Apere River basin. This species grows to a length of 29.5 centimetres (11.6 in) NG.
