= Pygidianops =

Scientific classification
- Kingdom: Animalia
- Phylum: Chordata
- Class: Actinopterygii
- Order: Siluriformes
- Family: Trichomycteridae
- Subfamily: Glanapteryginae
- Genus: Pygidianops; Myers, 1944

Type species
- Pygidianops eigenmanni Myers, 1944

Genus of fishes

Pygidianops is a genus of freshwater ray-finned fishes belonging to the family Trichomycteridae and the subfamily Glanapteryginae, the miniature pencil catfishes. The catfishes in this genus are found in South America.

== Species ==
There are four recognized species in this genus:

- Pygidianops amphioxus de Pinna & Kirovsky, 2011
- Pygidianops cuao Schaefer, Provenzano, de Pinna & Baskin, 2005
- Pygidianops eigenmanni Myers, 1944
- Pygidianops magoi Schaefer, Provenzano, de Pinna & Baskin, 2005

== Distribution ==
P. eigenmanni is from the Rio Negro basin in Brazil. P. cuao is known only from Cuao River drainage basin. P. magoi is known only from lower Orinoco mainstem between Ciudad Bolívar and Barrancas in Venezuela.

== Description ==
Species of Pygidianops share the extreme reduction of pigmentation, loss of the dorsal fin, the loss or extreme reduction of pectoral fins, a reduced lateral line, and the reduction or complete loss of eyes in some species. These fish are markedly miniaturized, yet retain a relatively well-ossified skeleton comparable in both bone differentiation and degree of calcification to that observed in larger trichomycterids.

P. cuao is distinguished from congeners by the presence of diminutive eyes (vs. eyes absent in both other species), posterior naris absent (vs. nares bilaterally paired), and the presence of a triangular skin flap at mouth corner (vs. skin flap absent). P. magoi is distinguished from all congeners by the absence of pectoral and anal fins (vs. fins present), posterior naris absent (vs. present, nares bilaterally paired), four laterosensory pores on the head (vs. six), and by the presence of 9–10 caudal fin rays (vs. 12–13). With all of its fins lost except the caudal fin, P. magoi represents the most extreme fin loss among ostariophysans. P. eigenmanni lacks eyes but has its anal and pectoral fins.
