= Typhlobelus =

Scientific classification
- Kingdom: Animalia
- Phylum: Chordata
- Class: Actinopterygii
- Order: Siluriformes
- Family: Trichomycteridae
- Subfamily: Glanapteryginae
- Genus: Typhlobelus; Myers, 1944

Type species
- Typhlobelus ternetzi Myers, 1944

Genus of fishes

Typhlobelus is a genus of freshwater ray-finned fishes belonging to the family Trichomycteridae and the subfamily Glanapteryginae, the miniature pencil catfishes. The catfishes in this genus are found in South America.

== Species ==
There are currently five recognized species in this genus:

- Typhlobelus auriculatus de Pinna & Zuanon, 2013
- Typhlobelus guacamaya Schaefer, Provenzano, de Pinna & Baskin, 2005
- Typhlobelus lundbergi Schaefer, Provenzano, de Pinna & Baskin, 2005
- Typhlobelus macromycterus W. J. E. M. Costa & Bockmann, 1994
- Typhlobelus ternetzi Myers, 1944

== Distribution ==
T. guacamaya originates from the Cuao River in the Orinoco River basin of Venezuela. T. lundbergi inhabits the lower Orinoco River, between Ciudad Bolivar and Los Castillos de Guayana (near Ciudad Guayana), Venezuela. T. macromycterus is known from the Tocantins River near Tucuruí, Pará State, Brazil. T. ternetzi lives in the upper Rio Negro basin, Brazil.

== Description ==
Species of Typhlobelus share the extreme reduction of pigmentation, loss of the dorsal fin, the loss or extreme reduction of pectoral fins, a reduced lateral line, and the reduction or complete loss of eyes in some species. These fish are markedly miniaturized, yet retain a relatively well-ossified skeleton comparable in both bone differentiation and degree of calcification to that observed in larger trichomycterids.

T. guacamaya is distinguished from all congeners by the presence of three branchiostegal rays (vs. four in T. ternetzi and T. lundbergi, five in T. macromycterus), posterior naris absent (vs. present, nares bilaterally paired), and the lack of pleural ribs (vs. one pair of pleural ribs associated with the first free vertebra). T. lundbergi is distinguished from all congeners by the presence of four laterosensory pores on the head (vs. three). Both T. guacamaya and T. lundbergi are distinguished from ternetzi and T. macromycterus by the absence of eyes (vs. eyes present and vestigial); between T. ternetzi and T. lundbergi, the distinction may be between the presence or absence of eyes or eyespots. T. macromycterus has one or two odontodes on the opercle and five branchiostegal rays, while T. ternetzi and T. lundbergi have no odontodes and four branchiostegal rays.

These fish have greatly elongate, slender bodies. These fish have three pairs of barbels, all similar in length and general appearance. The mouth is ventral. Typhlobelus has a long duck-billed rostrum that protrudes anteriorly well beyond the bases of the maxillary barbels.
