= Preto da Eva River =

Coordinates: 3°10′13″S 59°09′04″W

Location
- Country: Brazil

Physical characteristics
- Source
  - location: Amazonas state
- Mouth
  - location: Amazon River at Amatari, Itacoatiara

Basin features
- River system: Amazon River

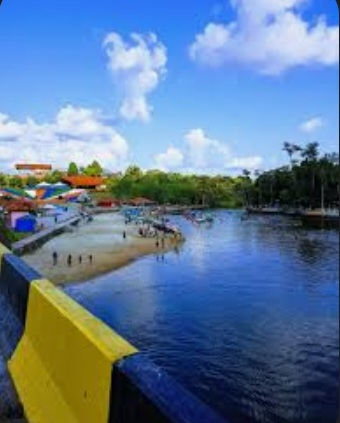
Río Preto da Eva.

Preto da Eva River (Portuguese: Rio Preto da Eva) is a left tributary of Amazon River in the Amazonas state in north-western Brazil.

== See also ==
- List of rivers of Amazonas
