= Glanapteryginae =

Scientific classification
- Kingdom: Animalia
- Phylum: Chordata
- Class: Actinopterygii
- Order: Siluriformes
- Family: Trichomycteridae
- Subfamily: Glanapteryginae; Myers, 1944

Type genus
- Glanapteryx Myers, 1927

Genera
- see text

Subfamily of fishes

The Glanapteryginae, the miniature pencil catfishes, are a subfamily of freshwater ra-finned fishes belonging to the family Trichomycteridae.

== Phylogeny ==
Monophyly of the subfamily is supported by five synapomorphies involving reductions in the fins, caudal skeleton, and laterosensory system. It has been proposed that the sister group to this subfamily is the Sarcoglanidinae. Listrura was formerly the sister group to the remainder of the subfamily but is now in Microcambevinae. Glanapteryx is sister to a clade formed by the sister taxa Pygidianops and Typhlobelus.

== Genera ==
Glanapteryginae contains the following vaild genera:

- Glanapteryx Myers, 1927
- Hyaloglanis de Pinna, V. J. C. Reis & DoNascimiento, 2025
- Listrura de Pinna, 1988
- Pygidianops Myers, 1944
- Salpynx de Pinna, V. J. C. Reis & DoNascimiento, 2025
- Typhlobelus Myers, 1944

== Distribution ==
Glanapteryx, Pygidianops, and Typhlobelus are distributed in the Orinoco and Amazon River basins. Listrura species are from Brazil, outside of the Amazon River basin. However, the distribution of glanapterygines may be greater than previously thought.

== Description ==
Most of the subfamily is constituted by 'miniaturized' species. Though miniature fish usually refers to fish that do not reach one inch (25.4 mm) standard length, Glanapteryx and Typhlobelus have been considered 'elongated miniatures' due to their paedomorphic features and small head sizes, despite their lengths exceeding an inch.

Pygidianops and Typhlobelus are the most modified glanapterygines, sharing extreme reduction or loss of pigmentation, fins, laterosensory system, and eyes; they are also miniaturized, yet retain the well-ossified skeleton comparable in both bone differentiation and degree of calcification to that observed in larger trichomycterids. All four of these genera are currently monophyletic.

== Habitat ==
Glanapterygine phylogeny indicates the evolution of the group followed a trend of decreasing dependence on leaf litter and increasing association with sand. Listrura species occur in shallow-water leaf-litter deposits underlain by mud or deeper layers of leaf litter. Little is known about the habitats of the species of Glanapteryx, but information available indicates they have been collected in association with leaf litter underlain with sand. By contrast, Pygidianops and Typhlobelus are entirely disassociated from leaf litter, and occupy exclusively clear water, loose sand; some species have been found to live exclusively in the substratum of the sand (rather than on the sand surface or in the water column above the sand), which could be the first vertebrates identified to be part of the meiofauna of benthic organisms. The latter two genera are more specialized for this lifestyle than any other catfishes, as evidenced by their loss of morphological traits. These two species also have paired keels, called metapleural keels, formed by long ridges of stiffened integument, extend along the entire ventral margin of the abdomen, ending posteriorly shortly posterior to the anus. These keels probably serve to stabilize the body while moving in sand.
