= Rio Grande do Sul =

State of Brazil

- State
- Flag Coat of arms
- Motto: Liberdade, Igualdade, Humanidade (Portuguese) "Liberty, Equality, Humanity"
- Anthem: Hino Rio-Grandense
- Location in Brazil
- Coordinates: 30°S 53°W
- Country: Brazil
- Region: South
- Capital and largest city: Porto Alegre

Government
  - Type: Unitary state
  - Governor: Eduardo Leite (PSD)
  - Vice Governor: Gabriel Souza (MDB)
  - Senators: Hamilton Mourão (REP); Luis Carlos Heinze (PP); Paulo Paim (PT)
  - Legislature: Legislative Assembly of Rio Grande do Sul

Area
  - Total: 281,707.149 km^{2} (108,767.738 sq mi)
  - Rank: 9th

Population (2025)
  - Total: 11,233,263
  - Rank: 6th
  - Density: 39.875676/km^{2} (103.27753/sq mi)
  - Rank: 13th
- Demonym(s): gaúcho, rio-grandense or sul-rio-grandense

GDP (2024)
  - Total: R$702.104 billion (US$130.286 billion)

HDI
  - Year: 2024
  - Category: 0.818 (6th) – very high
- Time zone: UTC-3 (BRT)
- Postal Code: 90000-000 to 99990-000
- ISO 3166 code: BR-RS
- Website: www.estado.rs.gov.br/inicial

Rio Grande do Sul (UK: /ˌriːuː ˌɡrændi duː ˈsʊl/, US: /- ˌɡrɑːndi duː ˈsuːl/, Brazilian Portuguese: [ˈʁi.u ˈɡɾɐ̃dʒ(i) du ˈsuw]; lit. 'Great River of the South') is a state in the southern region of Brazil. It is the fifth-most populous state and the ninth-largest by area and it is divided into 497 municipalities. Located in the southernmost part of the country, Rio Grande do Sul is bordered clockwise by Santa Catarina to the north and northeast, the Atlantic Ocean to the east, the Uruguayan departments of Rocha, Treinta y Tres, Cerro Largo, Rivera, and Artigas to the south and southwest, and the Argentine provinces of Corrientes and Misiones to the west and northwest. The capital and largest city is Porto Alegre. The state has the highest life expectancy in Brazil, and the crime rate is relatively low compared to the Brazilian national average. The state has 5.4% of the Brazilian population and it is responsible for 6.6% of the Brazilian GDP.

The state shares a gaucho culture with its neighbors Argentina and Uruguay. Before the arrival of Portuguese and Spanish settlers, it was inhabited mostly by the Guarani and Kaingang peoples (with smaller populations of Charrúa and Minuane). The first Europeans there were Jesuits, followed by settlers from the Azores. In the 19th century it was the scene of conflicts including the Ragamuffin War and the Paraguayan War. Large waves of German and Italian migration have shaped the state as well.

== Geography ==
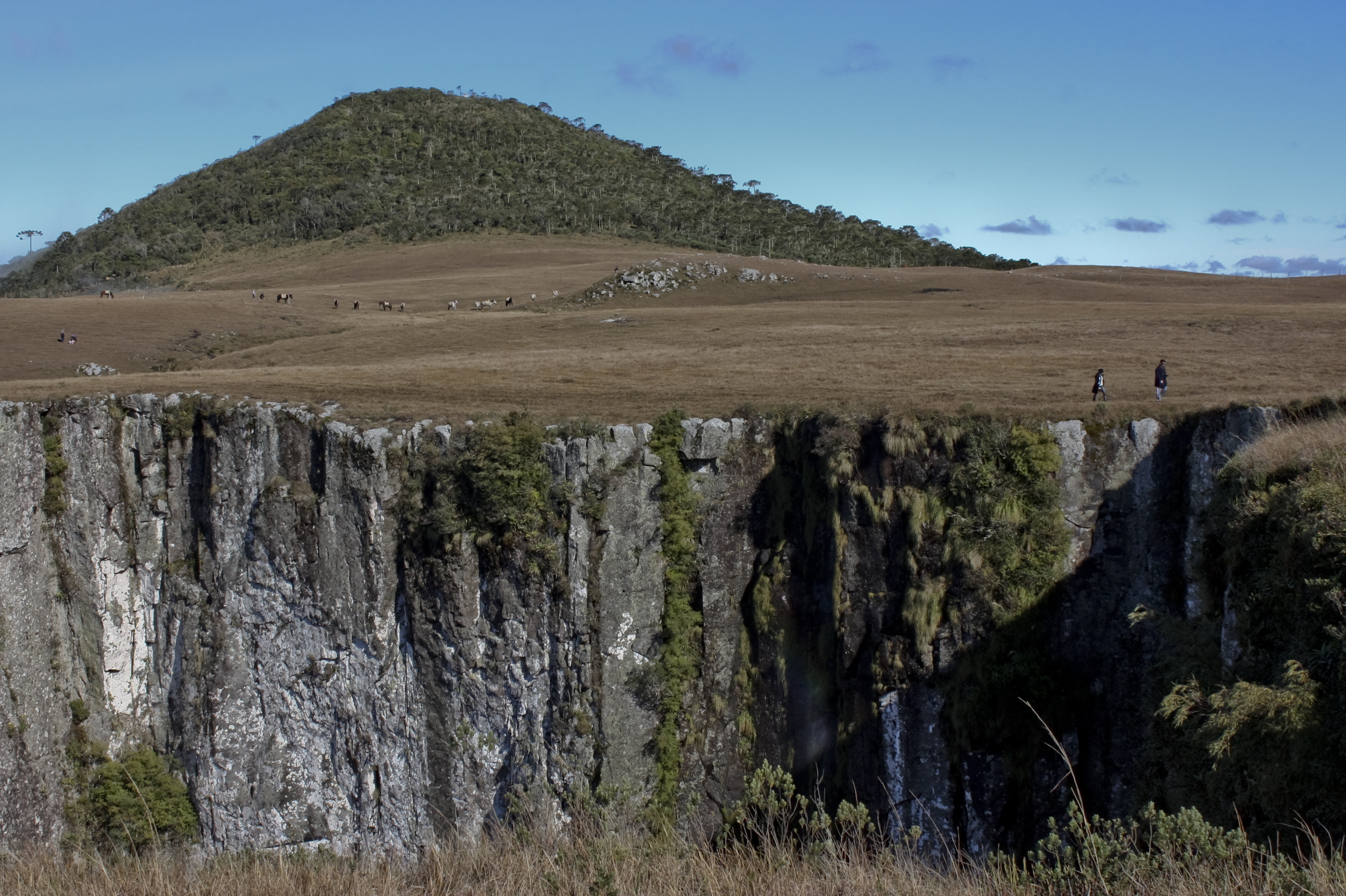
Pico do Monte Negro is the highest mountain in the state.

Map with municipal boundaries

Rio Grande do Sul is bordered to the northeast by the Brazilian State of Santa Catarina, to the southeast by the Atlantic Ocean, on the southwest by Uruguay, and to the northwest by the Argentine provinces of Corrientes and Misiones.

The northern part of the state lies on the southern slopes of the elevated plateau extending southward from São Paulo across the states of Paraná and Santa Catarina, and is much broken by low mountain ranges whose general direction across the trend of the slope gives them the appearance of escarpments. A range of low mountains extends southward from the Serra do Mar of Santa Catarina and crosses the state into Uruguay. West of this range is a vast grassy plain devoted principally to stock-raising – the northern and most elevated part being suitable in pasturage and climate for sheep, and the southern for cattle. East of it is a wide coastal zone only slightly elevated above the sea; within it are two great estuarine lagoons, the Lagoa dos Patos and Lagoa Mirim, which are separated from the ocean by two sandy, partially barren peninsulas. The coast is one great sand beach, broken only by the outlet of the two lakes, called the Rio Grande, which affords an entrance to navigable inland waters and several ports. There are two distinct river systems in Rio Grande do Sul – that of the eastern slope draining to the lagoons, and that of the Río de la Plata basin draining westward to the Uruguay River.

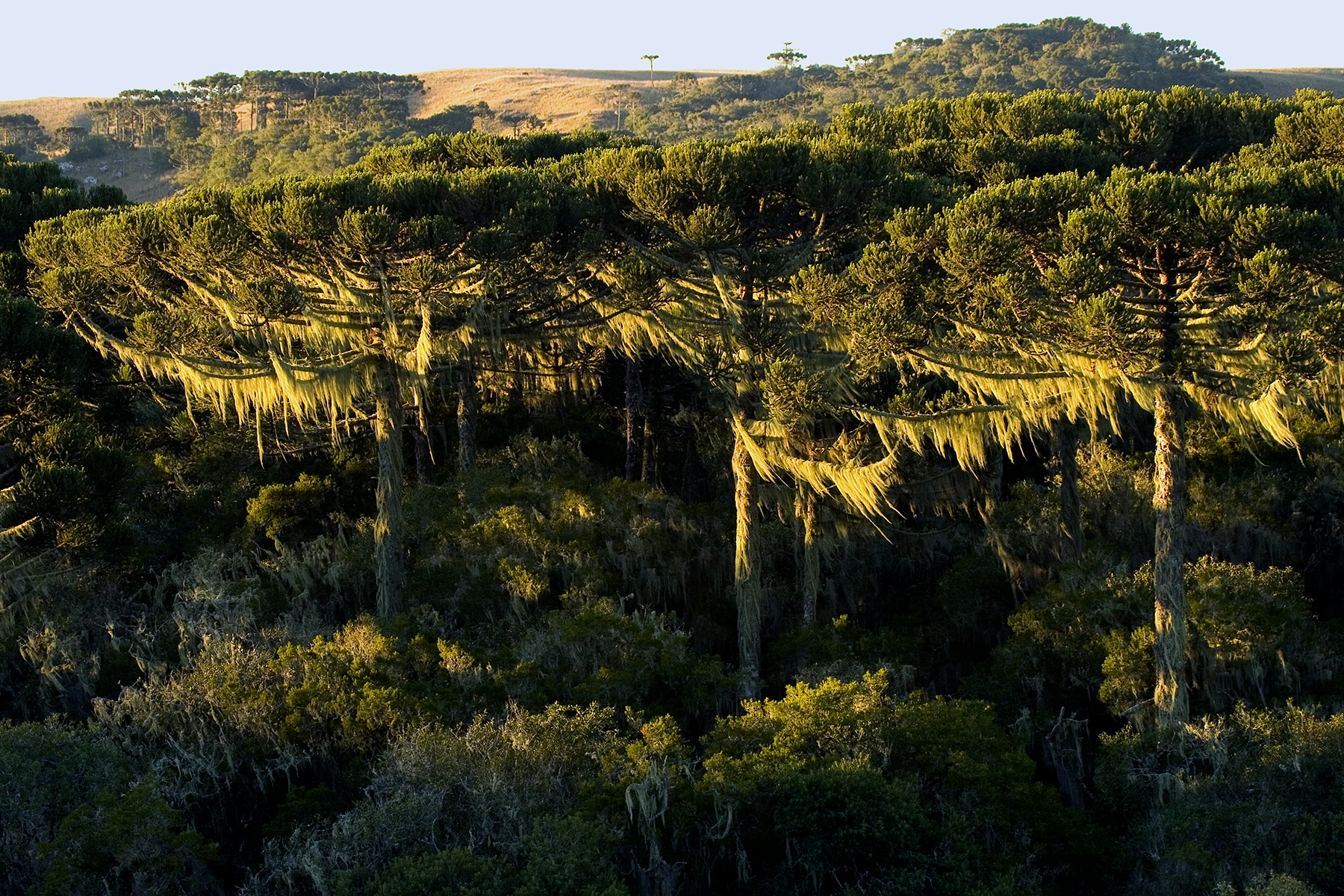
Araucaria forest in São Francisco de Paula

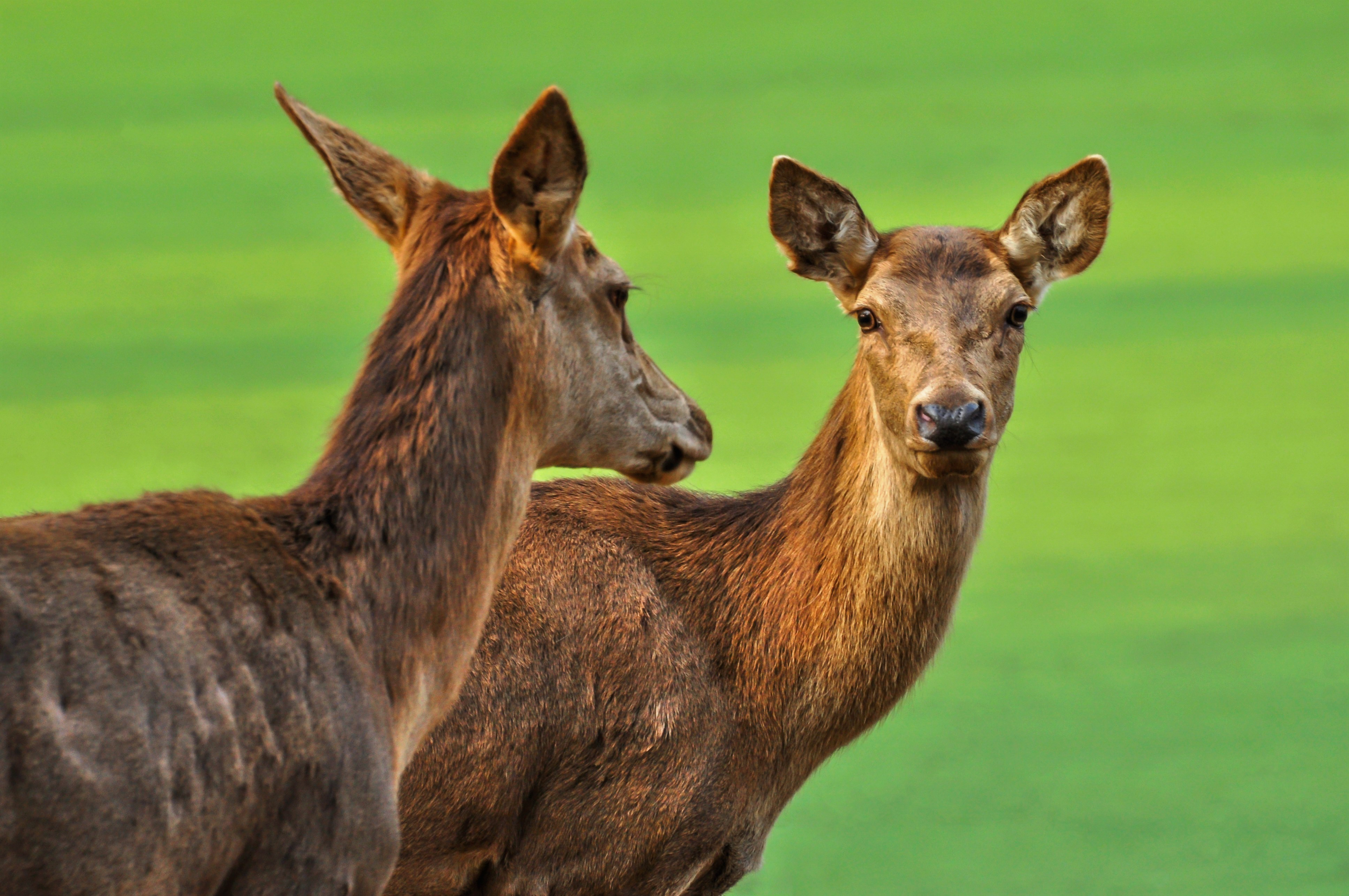
Pampas deer

The larger rivers of the eastern group are the Jacuí, Sinos, Caí, Gravataí and Camaquã, which flow into the Lagoa dos Patos, and the Jaguarão which flows into the Lagoa Mirim. All of the first named, except the Camaquã, discharge into one of the two arms or estuaries opening into the northern end of Lagoa dos Patos, which is called the Guaíba River, though technically it is not a river but a lake. The Guaíba River is broad, comparatively deep and about 56 kilometres (35 mi) long, and with the rivers discharging into it affords upwards of 320 kilometres (200 mi) of fluvial navigation. The Jacuí is one of the most important rivers of the state, rising in the ranges of the Coxilha Grande of the north and flowing south and southeast to the Guaíba estuary, with a course of nearly 480 kilometres (300 mi) It has two large tributaries, the Vacacaí from the south and the Taquari from the north, and many small streams. The Jaguarão, which forms part of the boundary line with Uruguay, is navigable 42 km up to and beyond the town of Jaguarão.

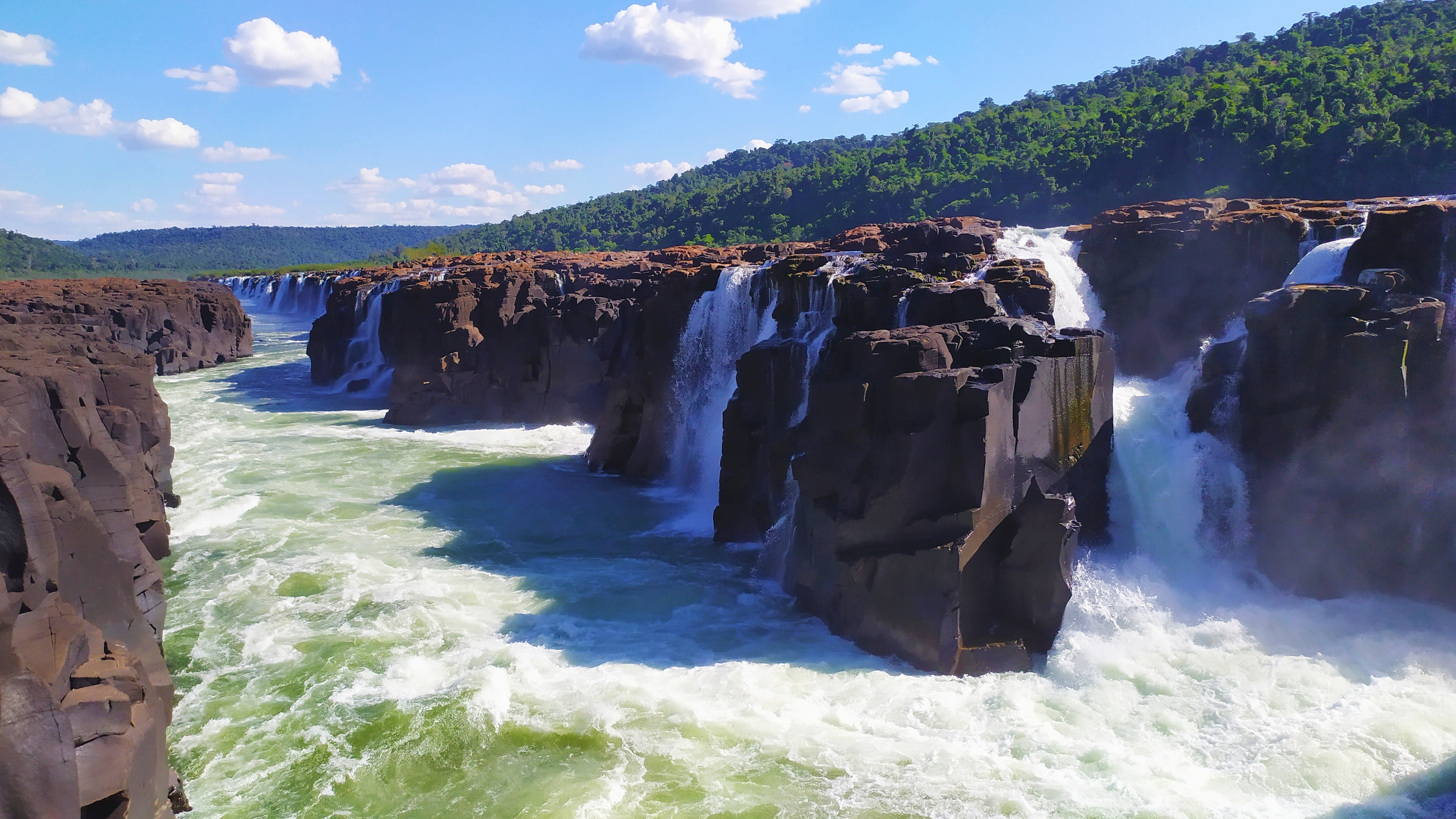
Yacumã Falls in the Turvo State Park are the second widest in the world.

In addition to the Lagoa dos Patos and Lagoa Mirim there are a number of small lakes on the sandy, swampy peninsulas that lie between the coast and these two, and there are others of a similar character along the northern coast. The largest lake is the Lagoa dos Patos (Lake of the Patos – an Indian tribe inhabiting its shores at the time of European discovery), which lies parallel with the coastline, northeast and southwest, and is about 214 kilometres (133 mi) long exclusive of the two arms at its northern end, 40 58 km long respectively, and of its outlet, the Rio Grande, about 39 km long. Its width varies from 35 to 58 km. The lake is comparatively shallow and filled with sand banks, making its navigable channels tortuous and difficult. The Lagoa Mirim occupies a similar position farther south, on the Uruguayan border, and is about 175 kilometres (109 mi) long by 10 to 35 km wide. It is more irregular in outline and discharges into Lagoa dos Patos through a navigable channel known as the São Gonçalo Channel. A part of the lake lies in Uruguayan territory, but its navigation, as determined by treaty, belongs exclusively to Brazil. Both of these lakes are evidently the remains of an ancient depression in the coastline shut in by sand beaches built up by the combined action of wind and current. They are of the same level as the ocean, but their waters are affected by the tides and are brackish only a short distance above the Rio Grande outlet.

Fully one-third of the state belongs to the Río de la Plata drainage basin. Of the many streams flowing northward and westward to the Uruguay, the largest are the Ijuí of the plateau region, the Ibicuí, which has its source near Santa Maria in the central part of the state and flows westward to the Uruguay a short distance above Uruguaiana, and the Quaraí River which forms part of the boundary line with Uruguay. The Uruguay River itself is formed by the confluence of the Canoas and Pelotas rivers. The Pelotas, which has its source in the Serra do Mar on the Atlantic coast, and the Uruguay River forms the northern and western boundary line of the state down to the mouth of the Quaraí, on the Uruguayan frontier.

=== Climate ===
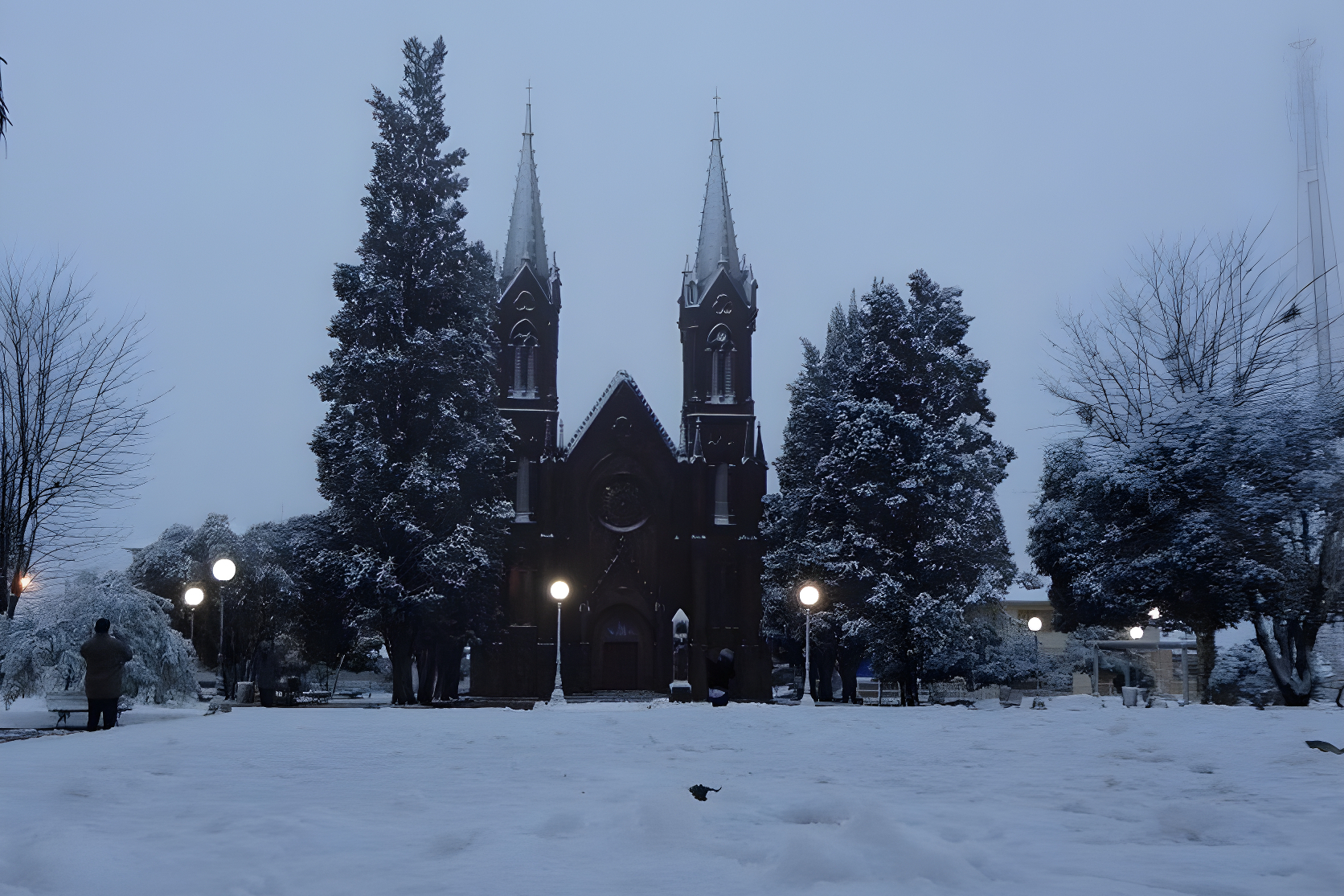
Snow in Vacaria, 2020

Rio Grande do Sul lies within the south temperate zone and is predominantly humid subtropical (Cfa, according to the Köppen climate classification). The climate is subtropical highland (Cfb) in the highest areas. There are four relatively well-defined seasons and rainfall is well distributed throughout the year, but occasional droughts can occur. The winter months, June to September, are characterized by heavy rains and by a cold southwesterly wind, called minuano, which sometimes lowers the temperature to below freezing, especially in the mountainous municipalities, where snowfalls can occur. The lowest official temperature registered in the state was −9.8 °C (14 °F) in Bom Jesus, on August 1, 1955. In summer, the temperature rises to 37 °C (99 °F), and heat related injuries are not uncommon.

=== Ecoregions ===
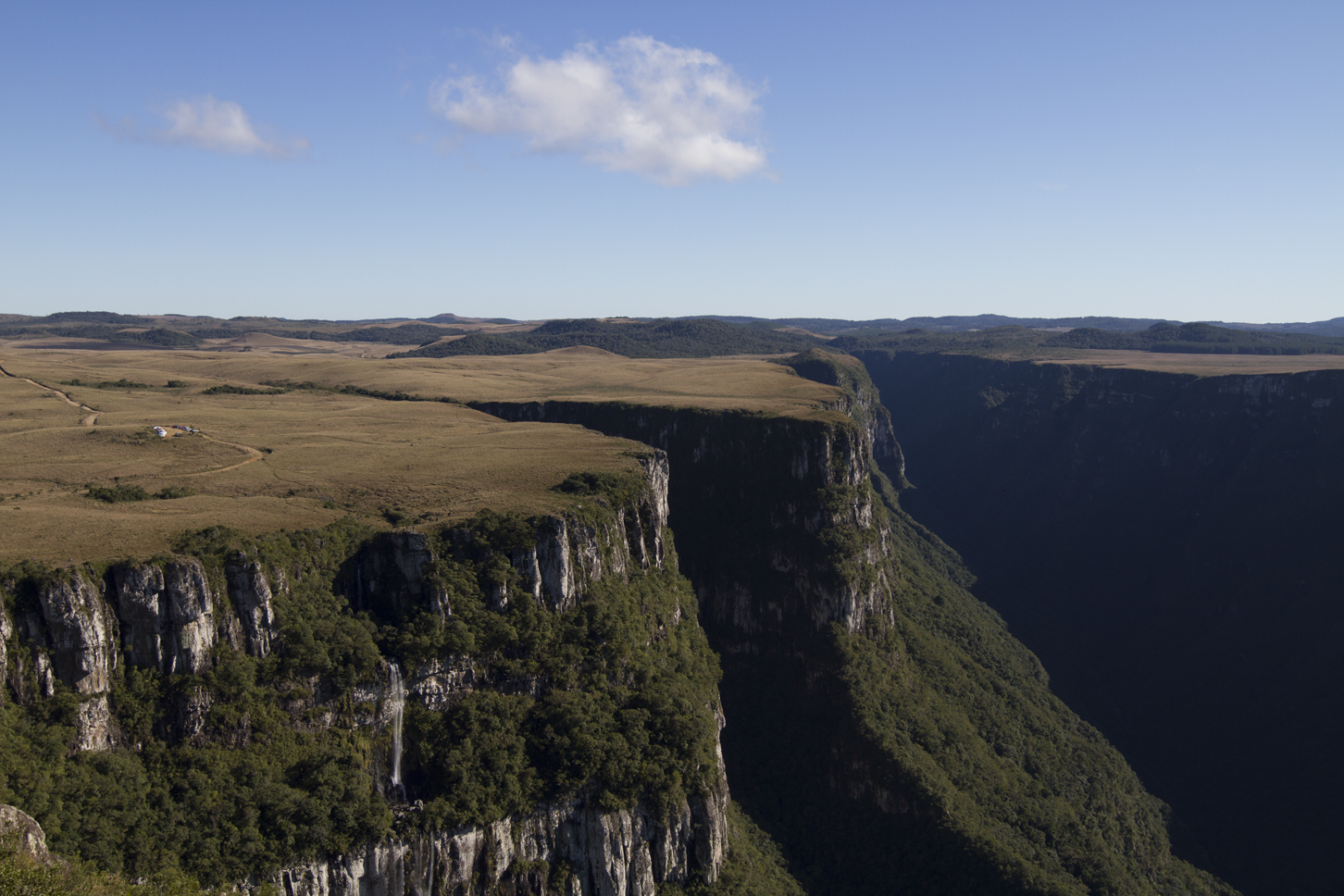
Canyon Fortaleza at the Aparados da Serra National Park

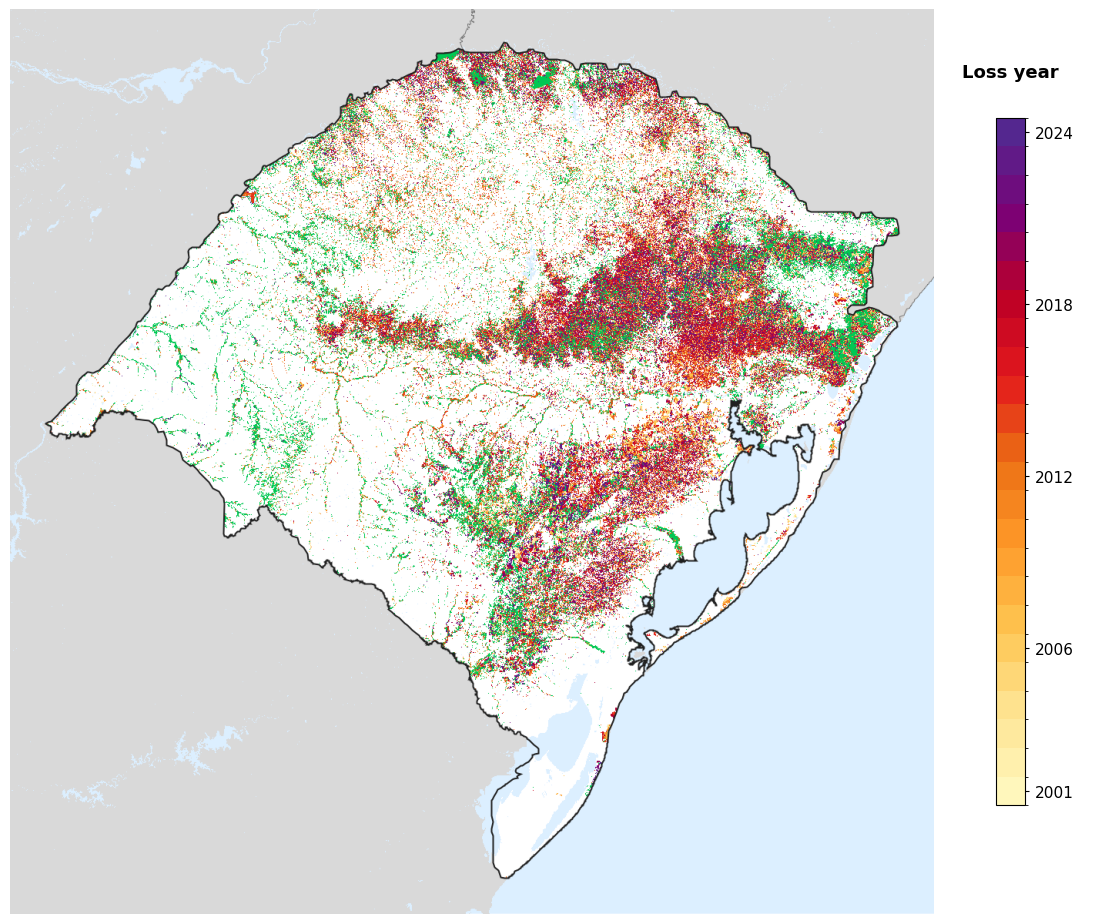
Tree-cover loss year in Rio Grande do Sul, 2001-2024, from the Global Forest Change dataset.

Several ecoregions cover portions of the state. In the northeastern corner of the state, between the Serra do Mar/Serra Geral and the Atlantic, lies the southern extension of the Serra do Mar coastal forests, a belt of evergreen tropical moist forests that extend north along the coastal strip as far as Rio de Janeiro state. The high plateau behind the Serra do Mar is occupied by the Araucaria moist forests, a subtropical forests characterized by evergreen, laurel-leaved forests interspersed with emergent Brazilian Pines (Araucaria angustifolia). The Alto Paraná Atlantic forests lie on the lower slopes of the plateau south and east of the Araucaria forests, including much of the lower basin of the Jacuí and its tributaries. These forests are semi-deciduous, with many trees losing their leaves in the winter dry season. The Atlantic Coast restingas, distinctive forests which grow on nutrient-poor coastal dunes, extend along the coast, as far as the Uruguayan border.

The southeastern portion of the state is covered by the Pampas, which extends south into Uruguay, in a plateau named Serras de Sudeste (Southeastern Mountain Ranges).

== Paleontology ==
The Caturrita Formation, rich in Triassic fossils, is located in the state of Rio Grande do Sul. Riograndia, a cynodont from these deposits, was named after the state in 2001. Other animals from Caturrita Formation include a dicynodont Jachaleria, a traversodontid Exaeretodon and a rhynchosaur Scaphonyx. The presence of Exaeretodon and Scaphonyx shows the relationships with the fauna of Ischigualasto Formation of Argentina while Jachaleria better correlates with the lower part of Los Colorados Formation. All three genera confirm the Late Triassic age of the deposits, older than the upper section of Los Colorados Formation.

== History ==
During the Brazilian Colonial period, the province of South Rio Grande was the scene of small wars and border skirmishes between Portugal and Spain for the region, the Sacramento Colony, and the Guarani Missions. It was also a focal point for internal rebellions in the 19th and the early 20th centuries.

=== Guarani Wars ===
According to the treaty of Tordesillas, the region was to be part of the Spanish possessions in South America. However, the Spanish were much more interested in the Pacific Coast, where gold, silver, and gems were quickly found. Even on the Atlantic coast, their attention was on the River Plate where they built the seaport of Buenos Aires, on its right bank. Consequently, Spanish settlement followed the course of the River Plate and its tributaries, especially the Paraná and Uruguay rivers, largely ignoring the Rio Grande do Sul area. The Spanish introduced livestock which escaped into the plains and attracted gauchos to the area.

The first Spanish to settle in the region that is now Paraguay, northwestern Argentina (Corrientes, Misiones), and Rio Grande do Sul were Jesuit missionary priests who came with the idea of converting the indigenous population to Catholic Christianity. To that end, they founded missionary villages known in Spanish as misiones or reducciones, populated by Guarani Indians.

In the early 17th century, the Jesuits founded missions to the east of the Uruguay river, and in the northwest of modern Rio Grande do Sul.

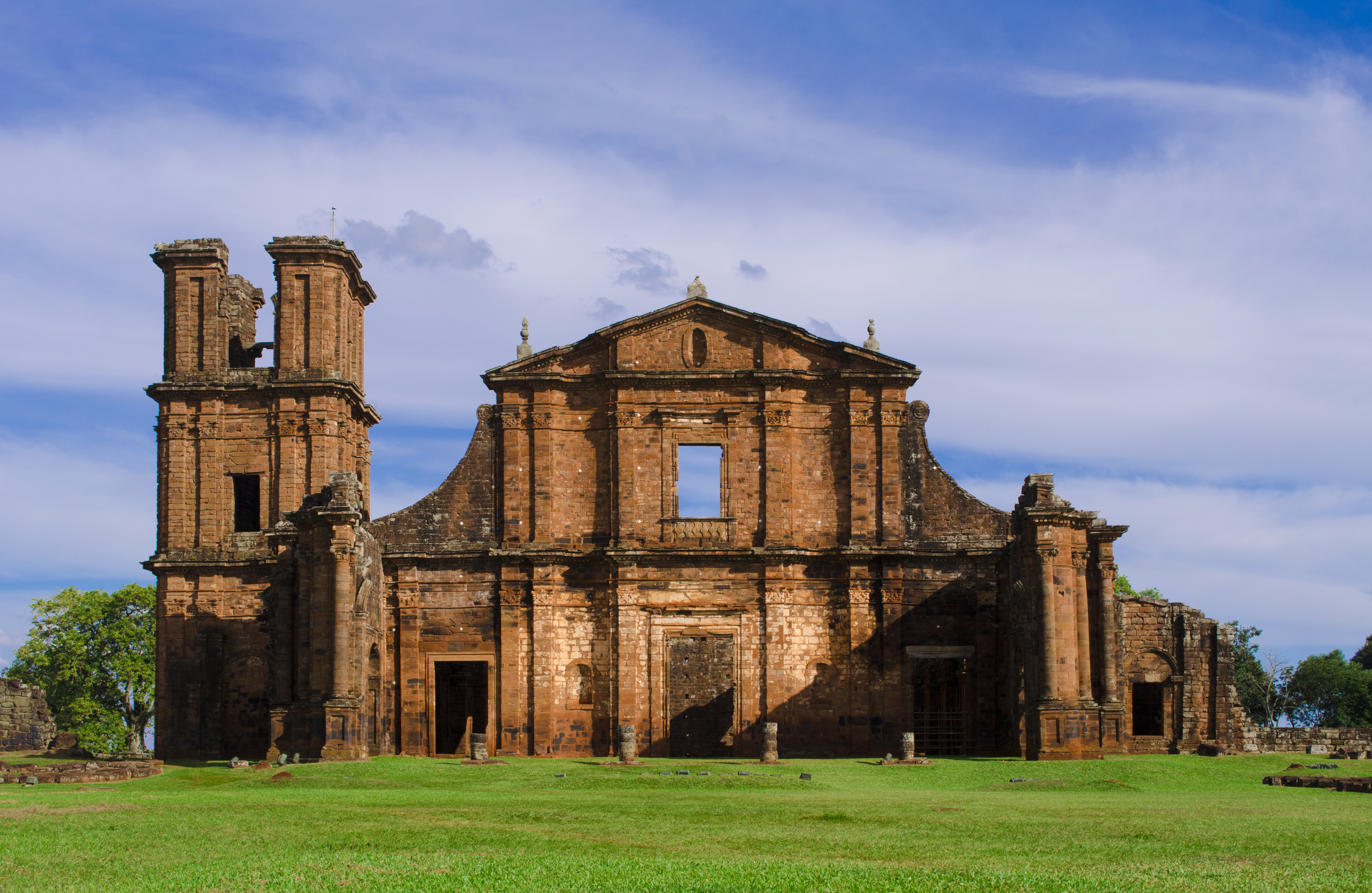
The historic town of São Miguel das Missões

The missions were destroyed and their Guarani inhabitants were enslaved in large raids by bandeirantes between 1636 and 1638; however, in 1687, the Jesuits were back in the region, having refounded seven reductions, the Misiones Orientales. The region remained under Spanish sovereignty, though in practice the Jesuits operated quite independently as consequence of the Spanish laws, up to the late 17th century. But in 1680, the Portuguese founded Colônia do Sacramento on the northern bank of the River Plate, in what is now Uruguay. War ensued and was intermittent until the independence of Uruguay in 1828.

The logistics of defending Colônia against the Spanish resulted in a government effort to settle Rio Grande do Sul's coastal region with Brazilian and Portuguese colonists. In 1737, a fortified village (today the city of Rio Grande) was built at the entrance of Lagoa dos Patos. In 1752, a group of Azorean settlers founded Porto Alegre; to the west, Rio Pardo was also founded. Towards the middle of the century, Brazilians and Portuguese arrived to the west of the region, clashing with the Jesuits and the Guaranis. Up to 1756, the Guaranis fought back, under the leadership of Sepé Tiaraju, who was popularly canonized as São Sepé (Saint Sepé). However, the Portuguese and Brazilians eventually crushed the resistance, destroyed the missions, and the region came definitely into Portuguese hegemony.

In 1738, the territory (which included the present state of Santa Catarina) became the Capitania d'el Rei and was made a dependency of Rio de Janeiro. Territorial disputes between Spain and Portugal led to the occupation by the Spaniards of the town of Rio Grande (then the capital of the capitania) and neighboring districts from 1763 to 1776, when they reverted to the Portuguese. The capture of Rio Grande in 1763 caused the removal of the seat of government to Viamão at the head of Lagoa dos Patos; in 1773, Porto dos Cazaes, renamed Porto Alegre, became the capital. These historic acts were planned and directed by Manuel Sepúlveda, who used the pseudonym José Marcelino de Figueiredo, to hide his identity. In 1801, news of war between Spain and Portugal led to the capture of the Sete Povos and some frontier posts.

In 1777, the Santo Ildefonso Treaty granted the coastal region to Portugal, and the Missões to Spain; but, in practice, both regions were populated by Portuguese and Brazilian settlers. In 1801, the Badajoz treaty handed the Misiones (Missões) to the Portuguese; only the borders between modern Uruguay and Rio Grande do Sul remained in dispute.

=== Cisplatine War ===
The districts of Santa Catarina and Rio Grande had been separated in 1760 for military convenience, and in 1807 the latter was elevated to the category of a "capitania-geral", with the designation of "Sao Pedro do Rio Grande", independent of Rio de Janeiro, and with Santa Catarina as a dependency. In 1812 Rio Grande and Santa Catarina were organized into two distinct comarcas, the latter becoming an independent province in 1822 when the Empire of Brazil was organized.

In 1816, the Portuguese captured Uruguay, which became a Province of Brazil (Província Cisplatina). This situation outlasted Brazil's independence from Portugal in 1822; in 1825, however, Juan Antonio Lavalleja proclaimed the independence of Uruguay; war followed, until in 1828 Brazil recognized Uruguayan independence.

=== Farroupilha Revolution ===
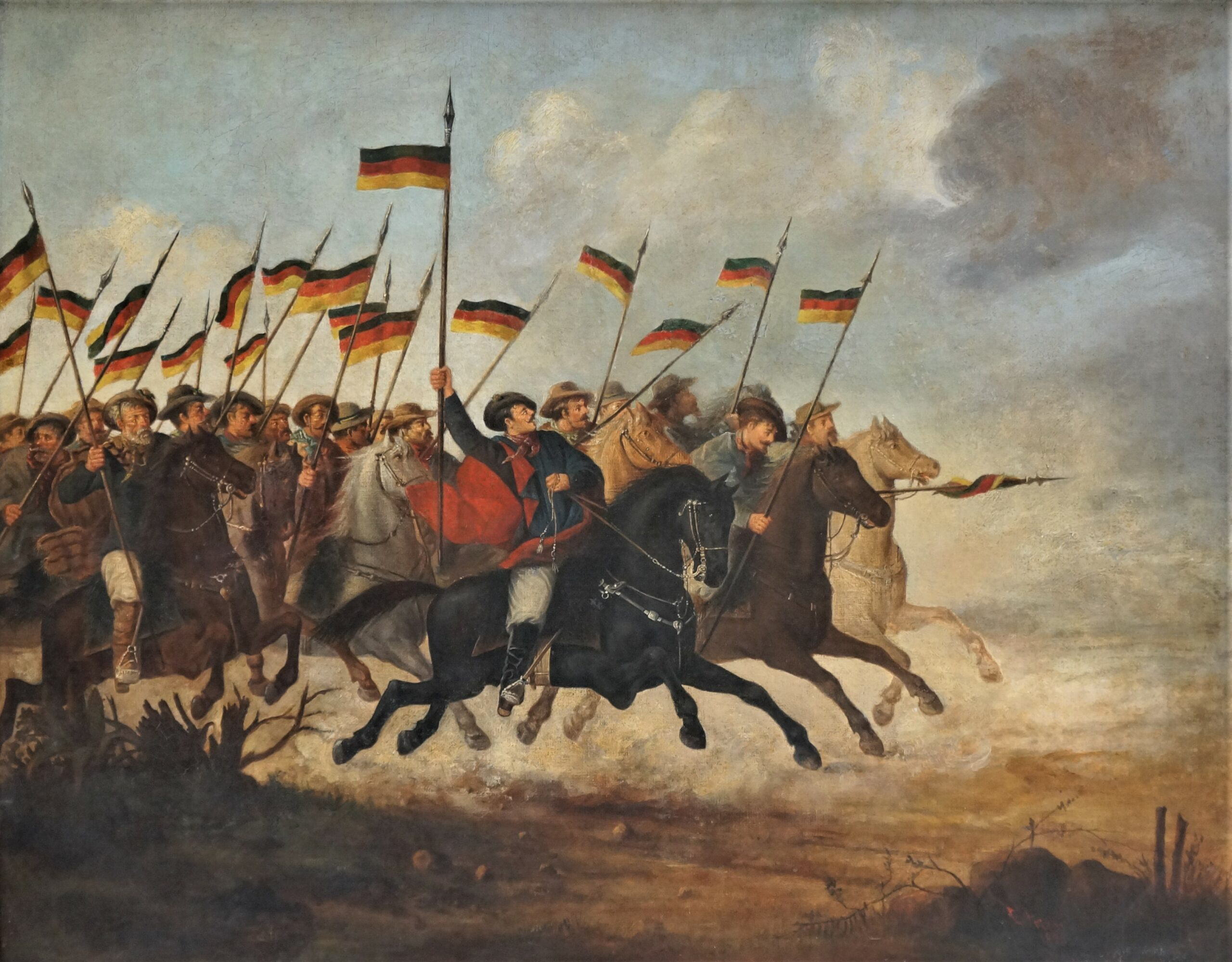
Rebel cavalry during the Farroupilha Revolution

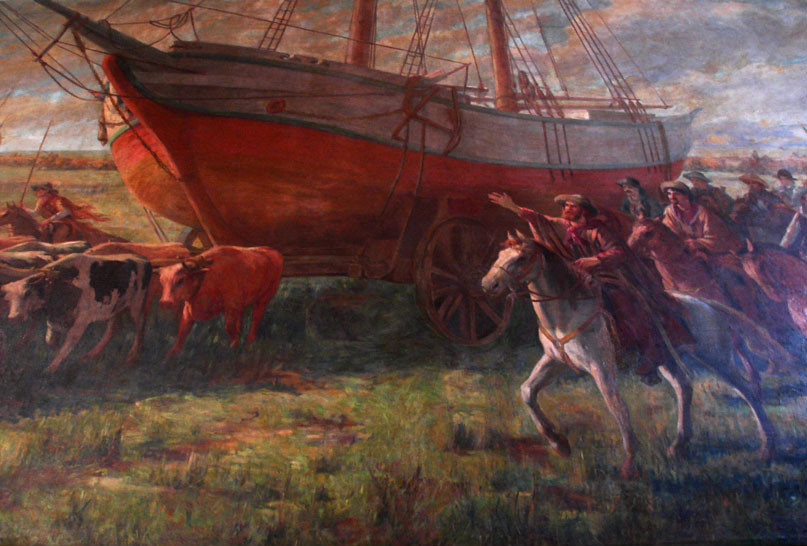
Giuseppe Garibaldi leading the Riograndense navy to Laguna. Painting by Lucílio de Albuquerque, 1916.

Populating Rio Grande do Sul was a constant concern of the Portuguese. To that end, the metropolitan Crown distributed land in the form of enormous latifundia.

In those large latifundia, cattle raising was the predominant economic activity. The Guaranis, under Jesuit rule, had started raising cattle in the Missões. The destruction of the Missões left astray immense herds, which went feral. Thus the newcomers from São Paulo and Santa Catarina settled by re-domesticating these feral herds, called "gado xucro".

The Azorean settlers, on the other hand, mainly introduced wheat crops in much smaller properties. Up to the beginning of the 19th century, wheat was the main export product of Rio Grande do Sul.

However, the introduction of charqueadas in the Southern coast, following the 1777 drought in Ceará, opened new opportunities to husbandry, as from them on, instead of moving herds by land to São Paulo, cattle could be sold in the relatively nearby region of Pelotas, to be slaughtered and processed there, and further transported by sea to Santos, Rio de Janeiro, and other Brazilian harbours. The cheap jerky was commonly used as food for the enslaved laborers in other parts of Brazil.

Up to 1830, political unrest in Argentina and Uruguay favoured the jerky producers of Pelotas. But with order restored in these countries, competition by Argentinian and Uruguayan jerky producers became a concern. The jerky industry of the Plata was favored by the superior quality of Argentinian and Uruguayan pastures, by their better seaports, and by their use of free labor, instead of slavery. Consequently, the regional elites soon started to demand customs protection for the gaúcho jerky against the product of the Rio de la Plata; on the failure of the Imperial government to address those concerns, political demands of greater autonomy, and ideas of a federal relationship towards the rest of Brazil were put forth.

These escalated into full rebellion in 1835. In 1834, the Imperial government issued an "Ato Adicional", allowing for elected Provincial legislative assemblies. The first gaúcha Legislative Assembly, inaugurated in April 1835, quickly confronted the Provincial President (appointed by the Regency on behalf of the Emperor, who was a minor). Rebellion broke out in the province on September 20, 1835; giving up hope of redress of the situation by the Imperial Government, the gaúchos proclaimed independence of the Riograndense Republic on September 11, 1836.

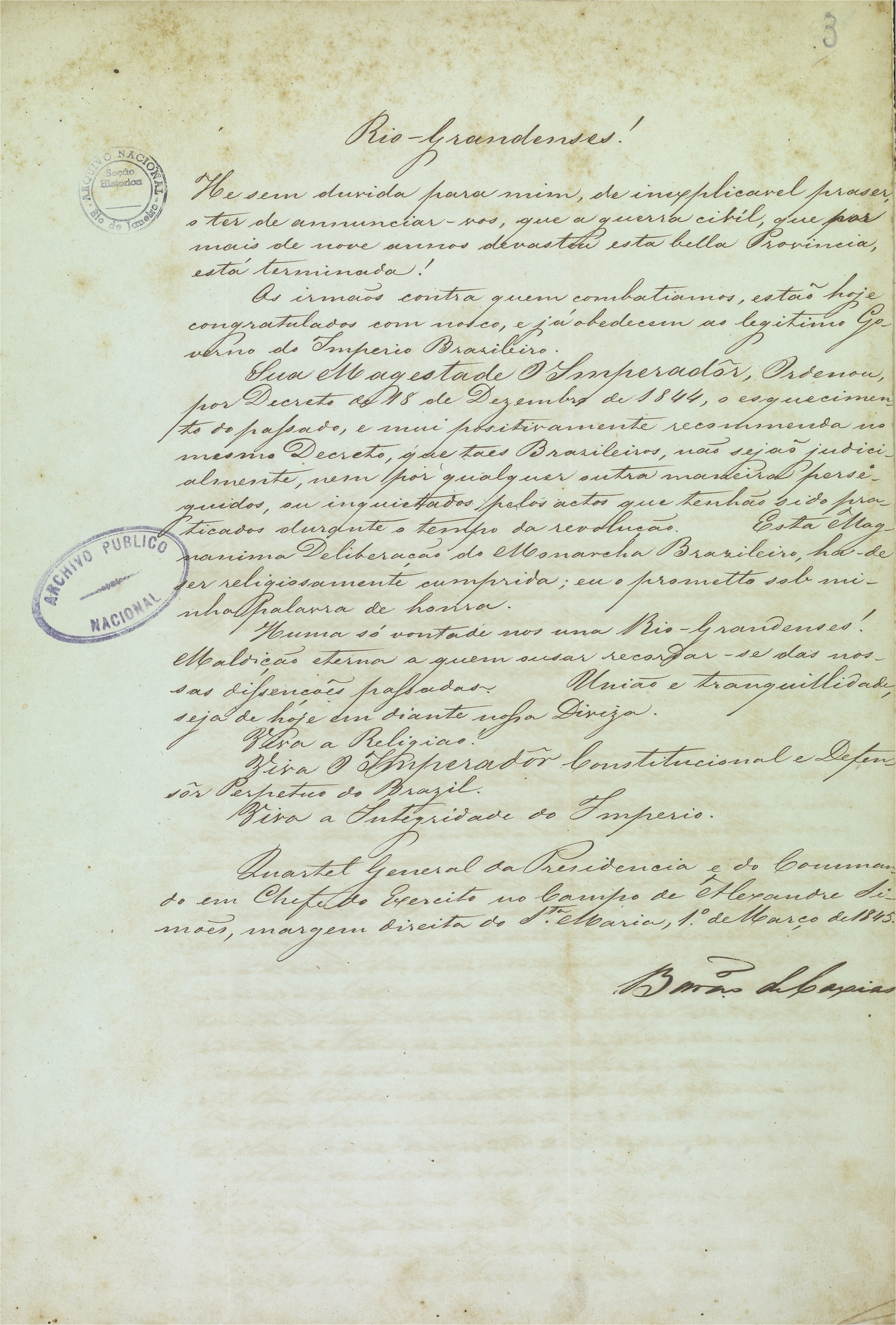
Declaration of the Baron of Caxias announcing the end of the Revolution Farroupilha, 1845. National Archives of Brazil

The ensuing Farroupilha Revolution (known locally as Guerra dos Farrapos) lasted ten years. The rebels stormed Porto Alegre, but were driven out from there in June 1836. From then on, the Empire was able to control most of the coastal region, achieving decisive strategic advantage from this. However, in 1839, the rebels were still able to invade Santa Catarina, where they proclaimed a Juliana Republic, in a federal relationship with Rio Grande do Sul (during the Santa Catarina campaign, Giuseppe Garibaldi joined the rebels for a while before he returned to Europe and eventually became a hero in his native Italy). The Empire soon retook initiative, though, and from them on the rebels fought in the defensive.

In 1842, the Empire assigned a new Provincial governor and military commander, the Baron, later Duke of Caxias. The inability of the rebels to secure contact with the world through a seaport, the dwindling economy of the Province, combined with Caxias' superior capabilities as military commander, led to the fall, in 1843, of important rebel strongholds, Caçapava do Sul, Bagé, and Alegrete. Economically exhausted and militarily defeated, the rebels accepted Caxias' terms of surrender. A general amnesty was declared, the rebellious officials were incorporated into the Imperial Army, slaves enrolled in the rebel Army were freed. Additionally, the Empire imposed a 25% tax on foreign jerky imports.

The province suffered greatly in the struggle, but recovered quickly, not only due to the import tax protection, but mainly due to renewed instability in Argentina and Uruguay: Rosas' government in Argentina continually interfered in Uruguayan affairs until 1851, and Buenos Aires was blockaded by the French and the English from 1845 to 1848.

=== Conflicts with neighbouring countries ===
At the mid-19th century, Rio Grande do Sul was repeatedly involved in war between Brazil and its neighbours. Those included war against Argentina and Uruguay (deposal of Juan Manuel Rosas, Argentinian dictator, and Manuel Ceferino Oribe y Viana, Uruguayan president, 1852) and intervention in Uruguay (deposal of Atanasio Cruz Aguirre, 1864). This, in turn, led to Paraguayan intervention, and the Paraguayan War, known in Portuguese as Guerra do Paraguai.

In the war against Rosas, 75% of the Brazilian troops were gaúchos. As the only Brazilian boundaries actually facing foreign armies able to project the Empire's power, Rio Grande do Sul and its gaúchos quickly developed a reputation as soldiers.

=== Paraguayan War ===
Map of Rio Grande do Sul in 1877 during the Empire of Brazil. National Archives of Brazil.

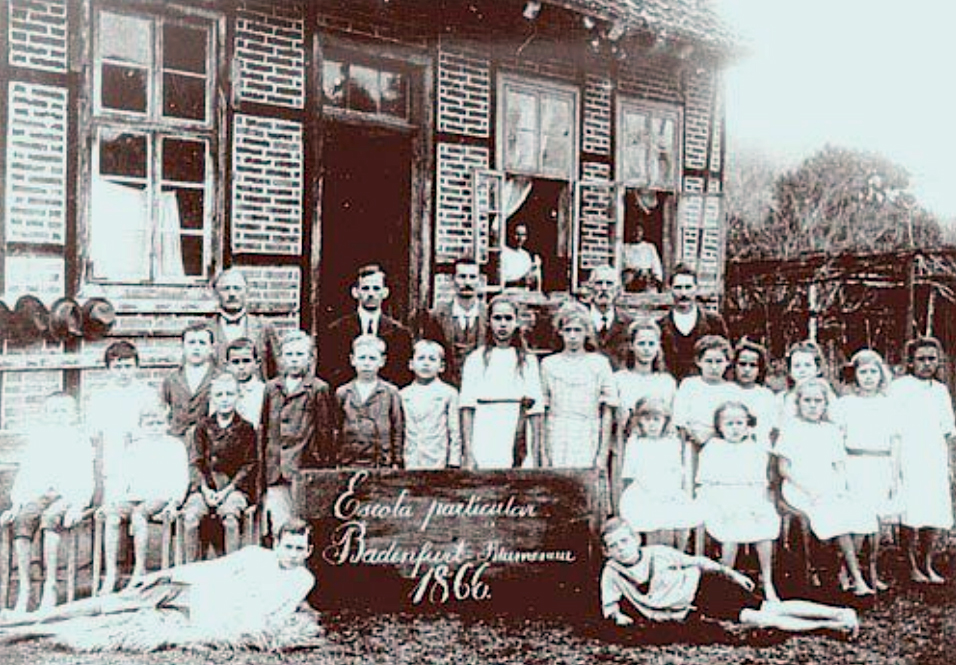
A German school in Estrela, 1866

During this long and bloody war against Paraguay, Rio Grande do Sul remained usually a secondary front. But in 1865 a Paraguayan division invaded the state, occupying Uruguaiana by August 5. By August 16, troops of the Triple Alliance put siege to Uruguaiana, and by September 17, an ultimatum was delivered to General Estigarribia, commander of the Paraguayan division. Having no possibility of breaking the siege or defending the position, the Paraguayans surrendered, under conditions, the following day.

But if the territory of Rio Grande do Sul was spared most action, its dwellers provided a very significant part of the Brazilian troops: about 34,000 soldiers, more than 25% of the Brazilian army. This military characteristic of Rio Grande do Sul lasted long after the Paraguayan War: In 1879, of a standing army of less than 15,000, more than 5,000 were in Rio Grande do Sul. On the other hand, during the late Empire, more Brazilian generals were from Rio Grande do Sul than from any other province. In 1889, of 25 generals born in Brazil, four were from Rio Grande do Sul; and of the three born abroad, two were born in Uruguay but made their careers in Rio Grande do Sul.

=== Late Empire ===
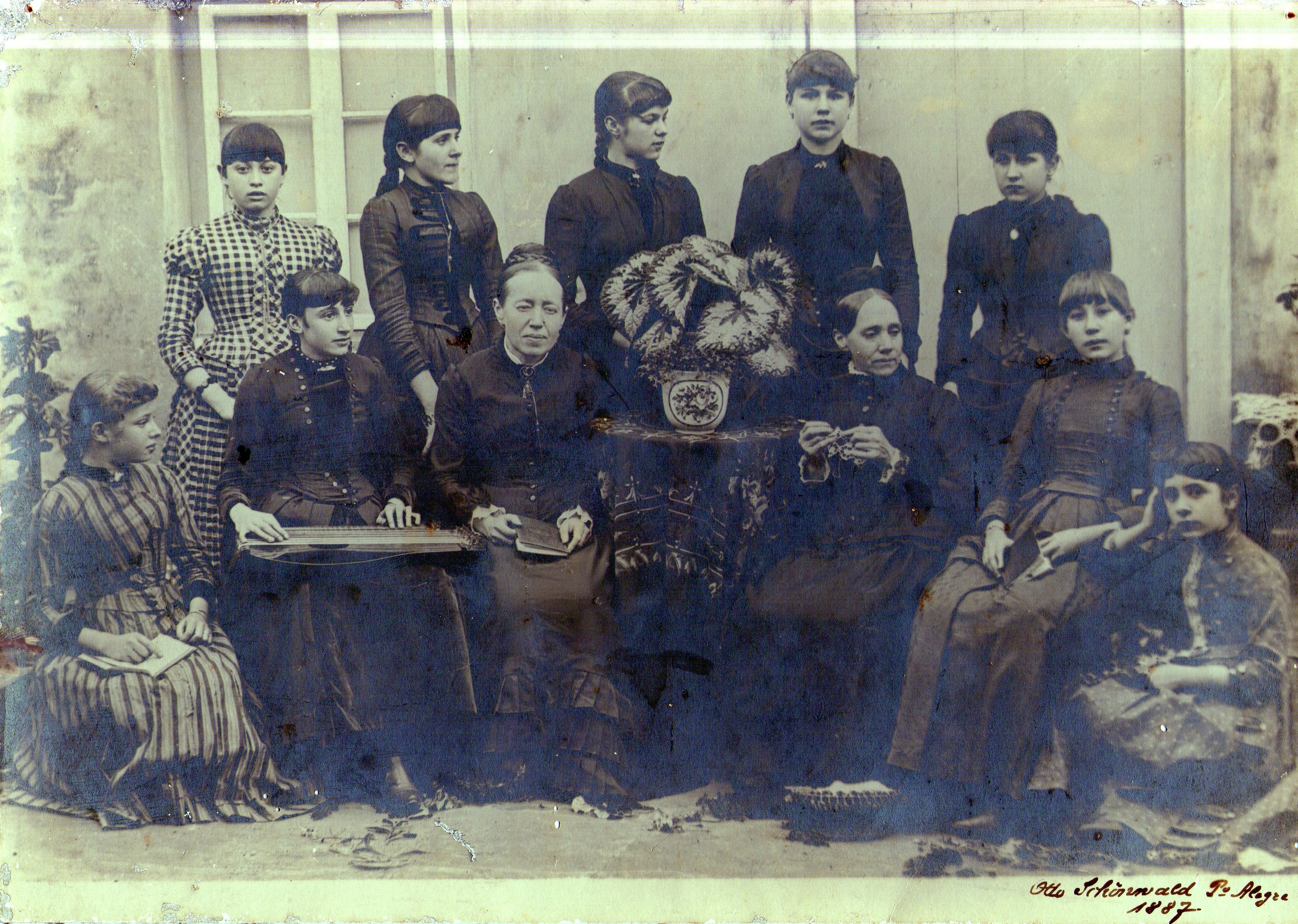
A German Protestant school for girls in Novo Hamburgo, 1886

Political agitation was frequent in Rio Grande do Sul, but no important revolution occurred after the Ponche Verde Treaty in 1845 until the presidency at Rio de Janeiro of General Floriano Peixoto, whose ill-considered interference with state governments led to the revolt of 1892–94, under Gumercindo Saraiva.

After the Paraguayan War, Rio Grande do Sul underwent important changes in its economy. Railways connected the countryside to Porto Alegre and Rio Grande. Together with the introduction of steam ships, this reduced the costs and duration of transportation, facilitating the province's exports. New cattle breeds were introduced, and barbed wire was used to demarcate properties.

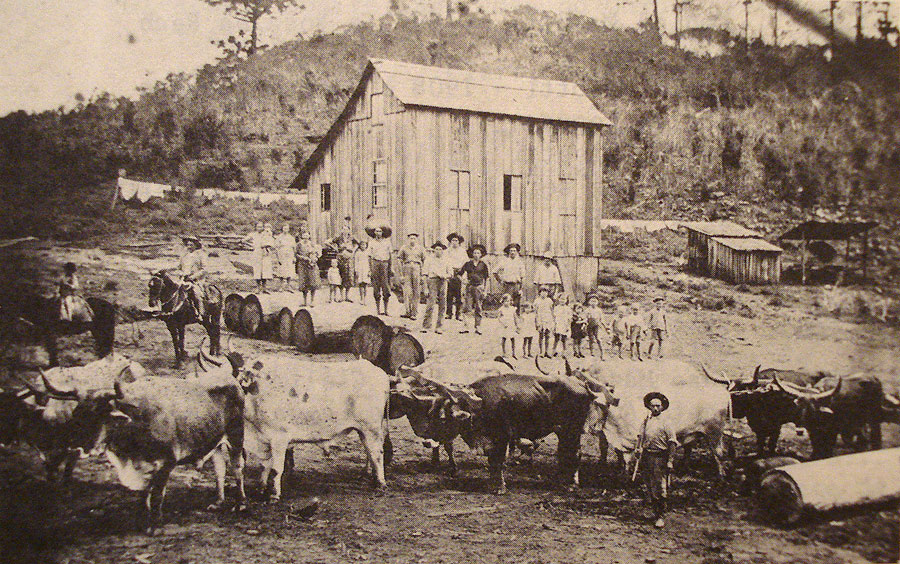
Italian immigrants in Rio Grande do Sul, late 19th century

As a consequence, the population of the province doubled between 1872 and 1890, from 434,813 inhabitants to 897,455. This was partly due to immigration: about 60,000 immigrants, mostly from Italy, and, in lesser numbers, from Germany, came to Rio Grande do Sul during this period. Most of the Italians settled in the Serra Gaúcha, and most of the Germans in the valleys of the Jacuí, Sinos, and Caí, as small landed proprietors, and agricultural producers. In the area of German settlements, a messianic movement, the Muckers (German for False Saints) erupted in 1874, and was smashed by the Brazilian Army.

Also during this period, the Liberal Party established its hegemony over the province, meaning control of the provincial legislature, the National Guard in Rio Grande do Sul, and most of the municipal governments. Before the War of the Triple Alliance, the Conservative and Liberal parties had alternated in local power, following the national tendency. But, from 1872 on, the Liberals, under the leadership of Gaspar da Silveira Martins, were able to retain provincial power, even when the Conservatives won at national level.

=== 1893 Revolution ===
In this struggle the revolutionaries occupied Santa Catarina and Paraná, capturing Curitiba, but were eventually overthrown through their inability to obtain munitions of war. An incident in this struggle was the death of Admiral Saldanha da Gama, one of the most brilliant officers of the Brazilian navy and one of the chiefs of the naval revolt of 1893–94, who was killed in a skirmish on the Uruguayan border towards the end of the conflict.

=== 1923 Revolution ===
In 1923, civil war again exploded between supporters of State President Borges de Medeiros and opposition linked to the Partido Libertador and Assis Brasil.

=== 1930 Revolution ===
In 1930, State President Getúlio Vargas, after unsuccessfully running in the presidential elections against the candidate of São Paulo, Júlio Prestes, led a revolt against the Federal government, and succeeded in overthrowing it. This eventually led to the Vargas dictatorship in 1937 and the period known as the Estado Novo. What is now the Rio Grande do Sul Military Brigade fought on the side of the state leadership and, as a result, was never reformed. In fact, the Brigade remains the only state militia in Brazil. (The Military Police is the federal force that polices in the other states.) A poignant example of the Brigade's quasi-autonomy is the participation of its servicemen in both the coup attempt of 1961 and the military coup in 1964.

== Demographics ==
Historical population
Year	Pop.	±%
1872	434,813	—
1890	897,455	+106.4%
1900	1,149,070	+28.0%
1920	2,182,713	+90.0%
1940	3,320,689	+52.1%
1950	4,164,821	+25.4%
1960	5,448,823	+30.8%
1970	6,755,458	+24.0%
1980	7,942,722	+17.6%
1991	9,135,479	+15.0%
2000	10,187,842	+11.5%
2010	10,693,929	+5.0%
2022	10,882,965	+1.8%

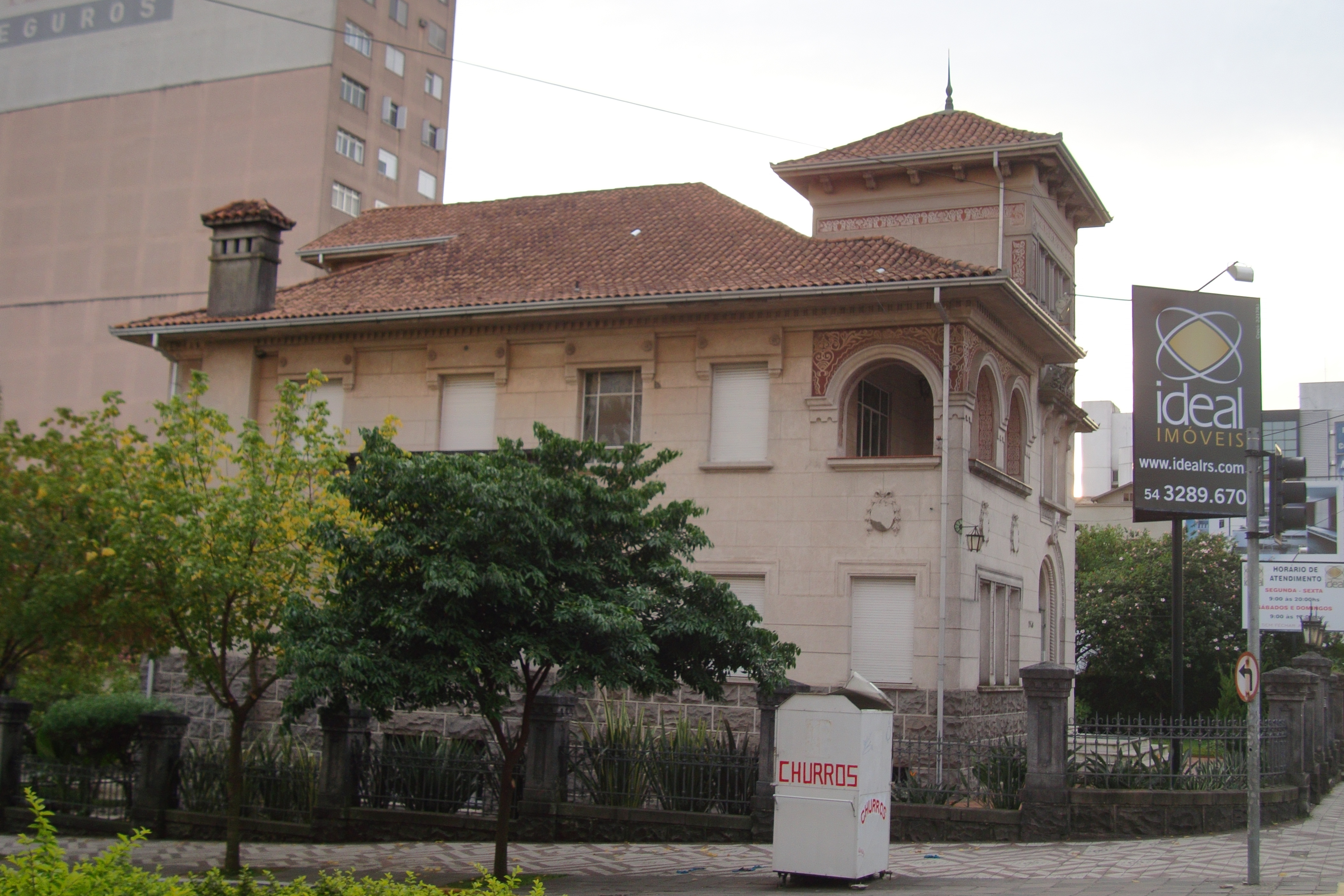
A 19th-century house built by Italian immigrants in Caxias do Sul

According to the IBGE of 2022, there were 10,882,965 people residing in the state. The population density was 38.63 inhabitants per square kilometre (100.1/sq mi).

Urbanization: 81% (2004); population growth: 1.2% (1991–2000); houses: 3,464,544 (2005).

The last 2022 census counted 8,534,229 white people (78.4%), 1,596,357 brown (Multiracial) people (14.7%), 709,837 black people (6.5%), 34,184 Amerindian people (0.3%), 8,158 Asian people (0.1%).

According to a genetic study from 2013, Brazilians in Rio Grande do Sul have an average of 73% European, 14% African and 13% Amerindian ancestry.

=== Ethnic groups ===
Ethnicities of Rio Grande do Sul in 2022
1. White (78.8%)
2. Pardo (mixed-race) (14.0%)
3. Black (6.10%)
4. Asian (0.30%)
5. Indigenous (0.10%)

People of Portuguese – mostly Azorean – background predominate in the coastal region. The Southwest, on the other hand, was originally populated by Pampean Indigenous. Like the other Gauchos from the La Plata Basin the population there was a result from the mixture of Spanish and Portuguese men with Amerindian women with a possible predominant Spanish ancestry and also a significant African contribution, resulting in a population that is 81.20% White.

These theoretical speculations about Spanish predominance among the population of Southwestern Rio Grande do Sul are widely presumed, but they contradict the historical knowledge about the region. In fact, there was always some Spanish colonial presence there, however in practice restricted to Jesuit religious initiatives towards the Amerindian populations, which had limited genetic impact in the demographic composition of aboriginal populations. On the other hand, it is broadly accepted that it is northern Uruguay that always has had an important Luso-Brazilian influence, which in fact impacts to this day the mixed Spanish-Portuguese language of northern Uruguay along the border with Brazil (borderlands).

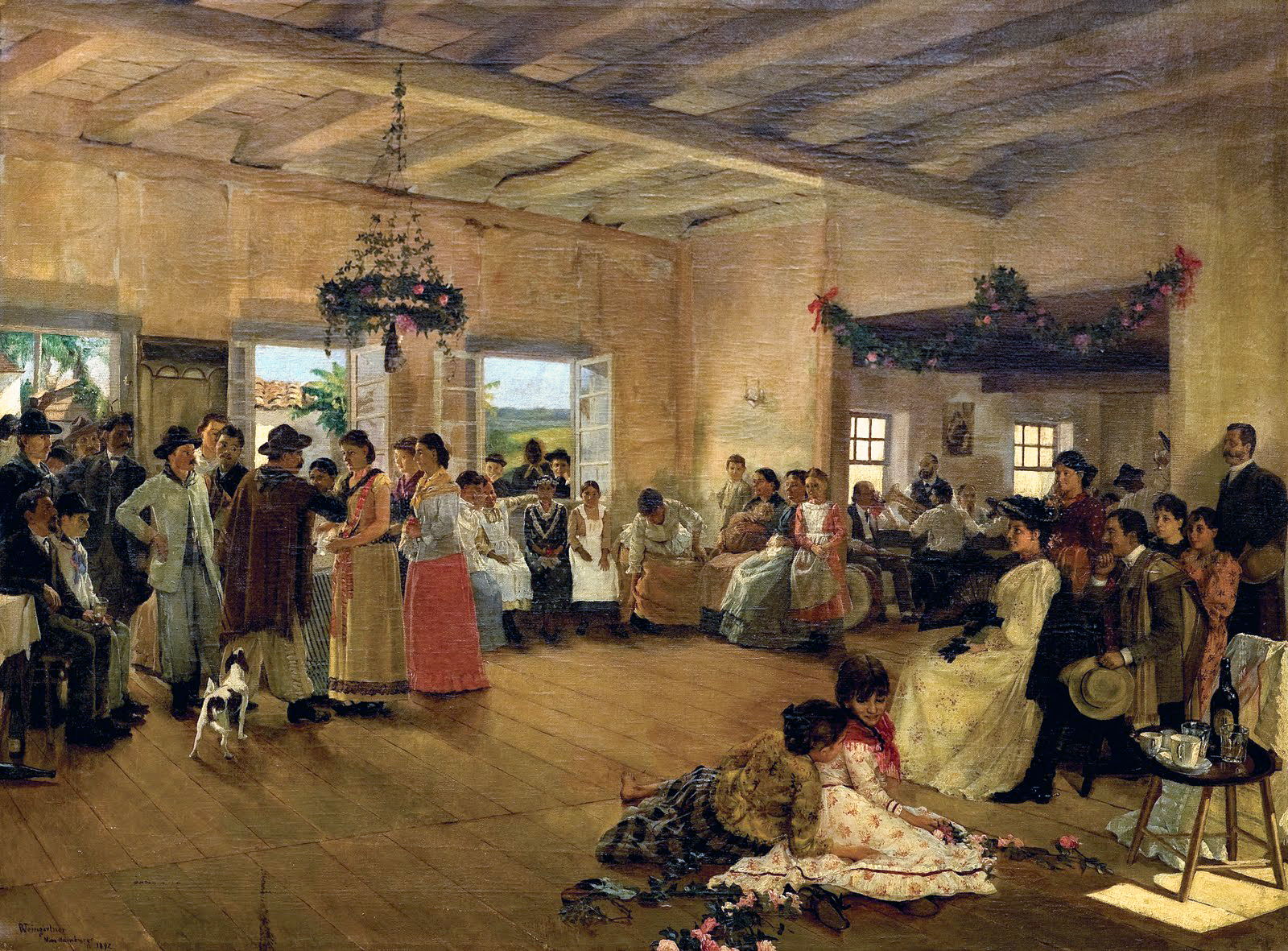
Kerb by Pedro Weingärtner, 1892. The work portrays a typical German festival in a rural community.

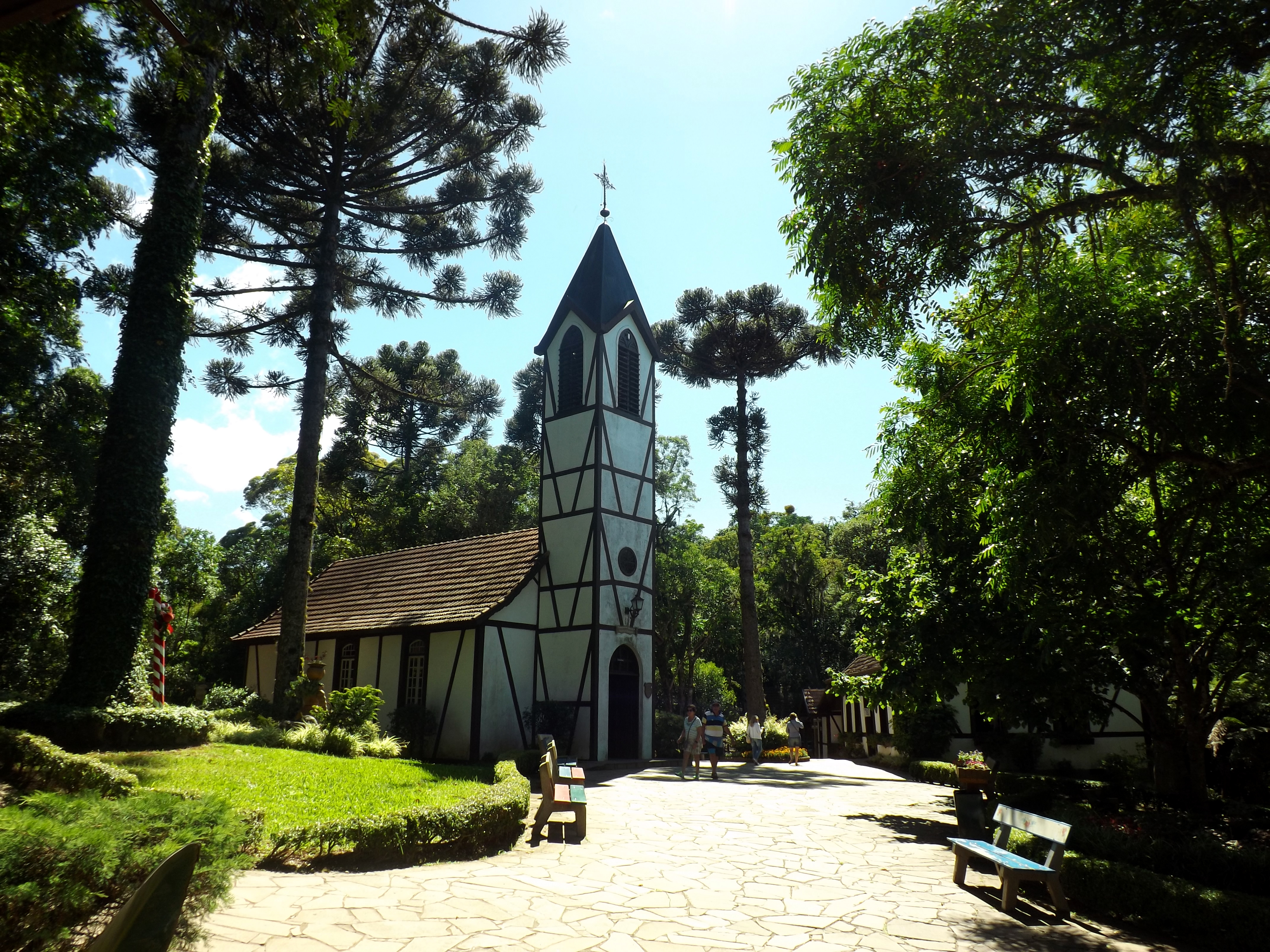
German architecture in Nova Petrópolis

People of German descent predominate in the Sinos Valley (Novo Hamburgo, São Leopoldo, Nova Hartz, Dois Irmãos, Morro Reuter, etc.) and in the center-eastern part of the State (Santa Cruz do Sul). People of Italian descent predominate in the mountains (Serra Gaúcha: Caxias do Sul, Bento Gonçalves, Farroupilha, Garibaldi, etc.). The Northern and Northwestern parts of the State also have significant numbers of people of both Italian and German descent. There are sizeable communities of Poles and Ukrainians across the state, notably in the northwest. People of African ancestry are concentrated in the capital city and in some cities in the litoral, such as Pelotas and Rio Grande.

According to Argentine demographer Miguel Ángel García, Italian immigrants were 60% of the total immigration to Rio Grande do Sul and according to French historian Jean Roche as of 1950 people of German descent made up 21.6% of the state's population.

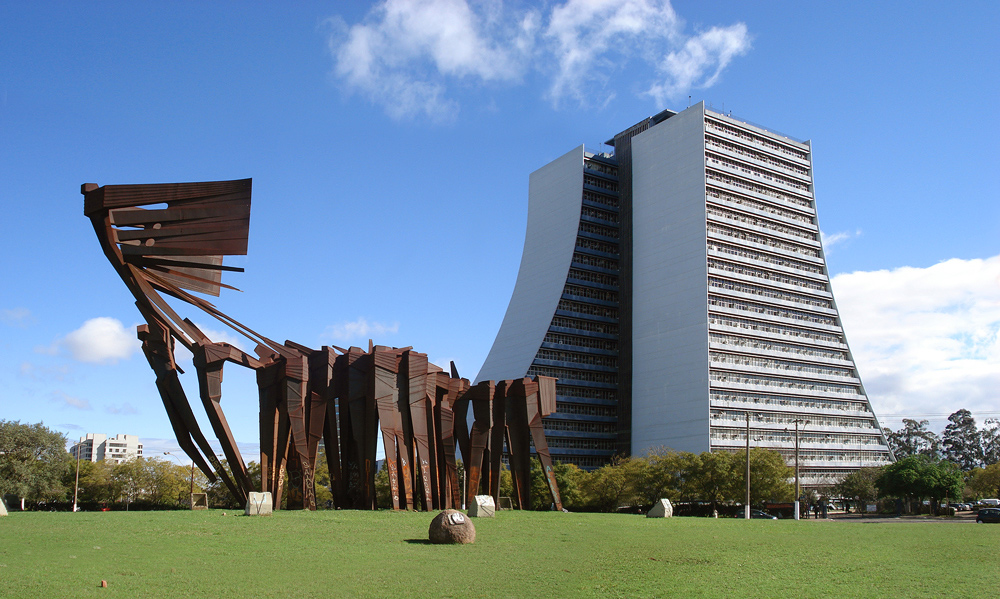
Monument in Porto Alegre to honor the Azorean immigrants

The region that is now Rio Grande do Sul was originally settled by Amerindian peoples, mostly Guaraní and Kaingangs and, to a lesser extent, Charrúas and Minuanes. European presence in the region started in 1627 with Spanish Jesuits. The Jesuits established Indian Reductions in the region; those reductions where populated exclusively by Amerindians, mainly Guarani, and certainly not by Europeans, either Spanish or Portuguese. Portuguese Jesuits established Indian Reductions in 1687 and dominated the region. Most of the Indians of the region became Catholics and went to live among the Jesuits. These reductions were destroyed by the Bandeirantes from São Paulo in the 18th century, who wanted to enslave the Indians. The Portuguese settlement in Rio Grande do Sul was largely increased between 1748 and 1756, with the arrival of two thousand immigrants from the Azores Islands, Portugal. They settled many parts of the state, including the nowadays capital, Porto Alegre. Blacks were 50 percent of Rio Grande do Sul's population in 1822. This proportion decreased to 25 percent in 1858 and to only 5.2 percent in 2005. Most of them were brought from Angola to work as slaves in the charqueadas.

German immigrants first arrived to Southern Brazil in 1824. They were attracted to Brazil to protect the country from invasions of the neighboring countries and to populate the empty interior of the southern region. The first city to be settled by them was São Leopoldo. In the next five decades, around 28 thousand Germans were brought to the region to work as small farmers in the countryside.

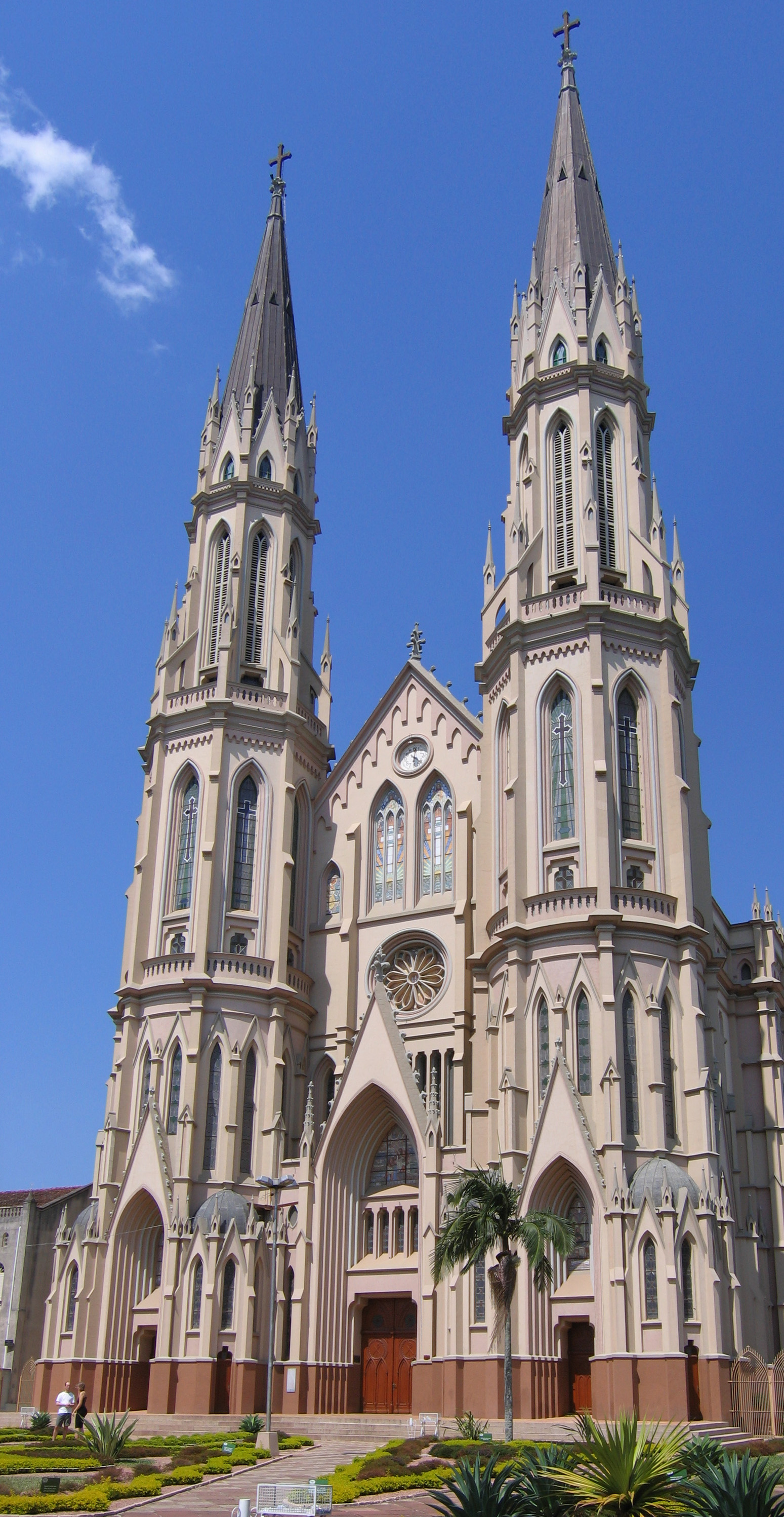
St. John the Baptist Cathedral in Santa Cruz do Sul

Italian immigrants started arriving in Rio Grande do Sul in 1875. They were mostly poor peasants from Trentino and Veneto, Northern Italy, who were attracted to Southern Brazil to get their own farms. Italian immigration to the region lasted until 1914, with a total of 100,000 Italians settling there in this period. Most of the immigrants worked as small farmers, mainly cultivating grapes in the Serra Gaúcha part of the state.

Other European immigrants migrated to Rio Grande do Sul, mostly from Eastern Europe. The Jewish Colonization Association assisted Russian-Jewish immigrants to settle on agricultural land in the state. A memoir of one such immigrant community, Filipson, Memórias da primeira colônia judaica no Rio Grande do Sul (Filipson: Memories of the First Jewish Colony in Rio Grande do Sul), was published by Frida Alexandr in 1967.

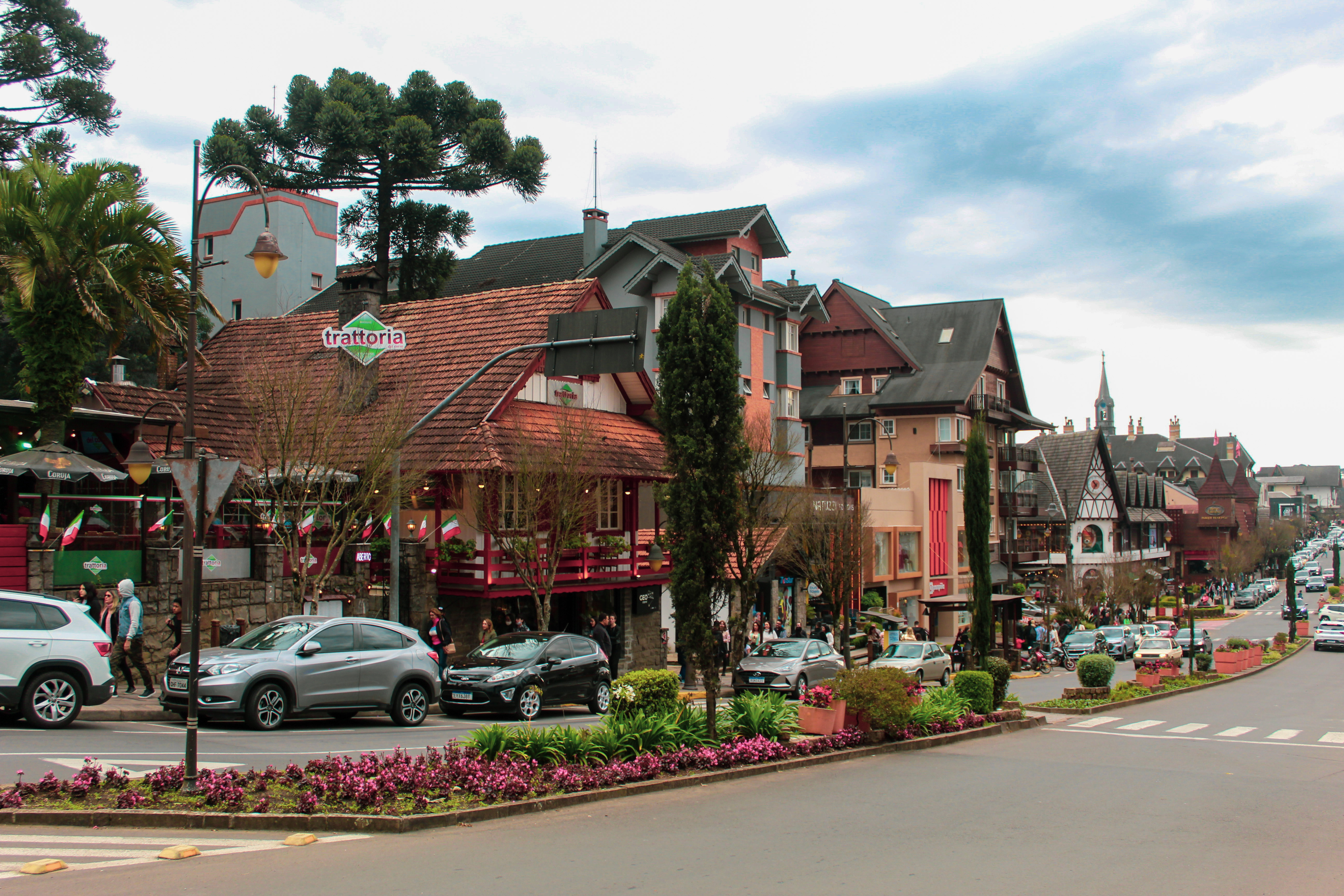
The town of Gramado, one of the most popular tourist destinations in Brazil, settled by Italian and German immigrants.

European genomic ancestry predominates throughout Brazil at 80%, except for the Southern Region (which includes Rio Grande do Sul), where it reaches 90%. "A new portrayal of each ethnicity contribution to the DNA of Brazilians, obtained with samples from the five regions of the country, has indicated that, on average, European ancestors are responsible for nearly 80% of the genetic heritage of the population. The variation between the regions is small, with the possible exception of the South, where the European contribution reaches nearly 90%. The results, published by the scientific magazine 'American Journal of Human Biology' by a team of the Catholic University of Brasília, show that, in Brazil, physical indicators such as skin colour, colour of the eyes and colour of the hair have little to do with the genetic ancestry of each person, which has been shown in previous studies".

As of 2013, there were fewer than 30,000 Nisei in Rio Grande do Sul. Japanese immigrant families from São Paulo State began arriving in Rio Grande do Sul in the 1930s. In 1956, the first 23 official immigrants came to the state, and 26 families arrived at Rio Grande in the years from 1956 through 1963. In 2013, Peter B. Clarke, author of Japanese New Religions in Global Perspective, wrote that "Nowadays we cannot speak of a Japanese colony in RS."

=== Largest cities ===
Largest cities or towns in Rio Grande do Sul (2019 estimative of Instituto Brasileiro de Geografia e Estatística)
Rank		Pop.	Rank		Pop.
1	Porto Alegre	1,483,771	11	Alvorada	210,305
2	Caxias do Sul	510,906	12	Passo Fundo	203,275
3	Pelotas	342,405	13	Sapucaia do Sul	141,075
4	Canoas	346,616	14	Uruguaiana	126,970
5	Santa Maria	282,123	15	Santa Cruz do Sul	130,416
6	Gravataí	281,519	16	Cachoeirinha	130,293
7	Viamão	255,224	17	Bagé	121,143
8	Novo Hamburgo	246,748	18	Bento Gonçalves	120,454
9	São Leopoldo	236,835	19	Erechim	105,862
10	Rio Grande	211,005	20	Guaíba	98,143

=== Religion ===
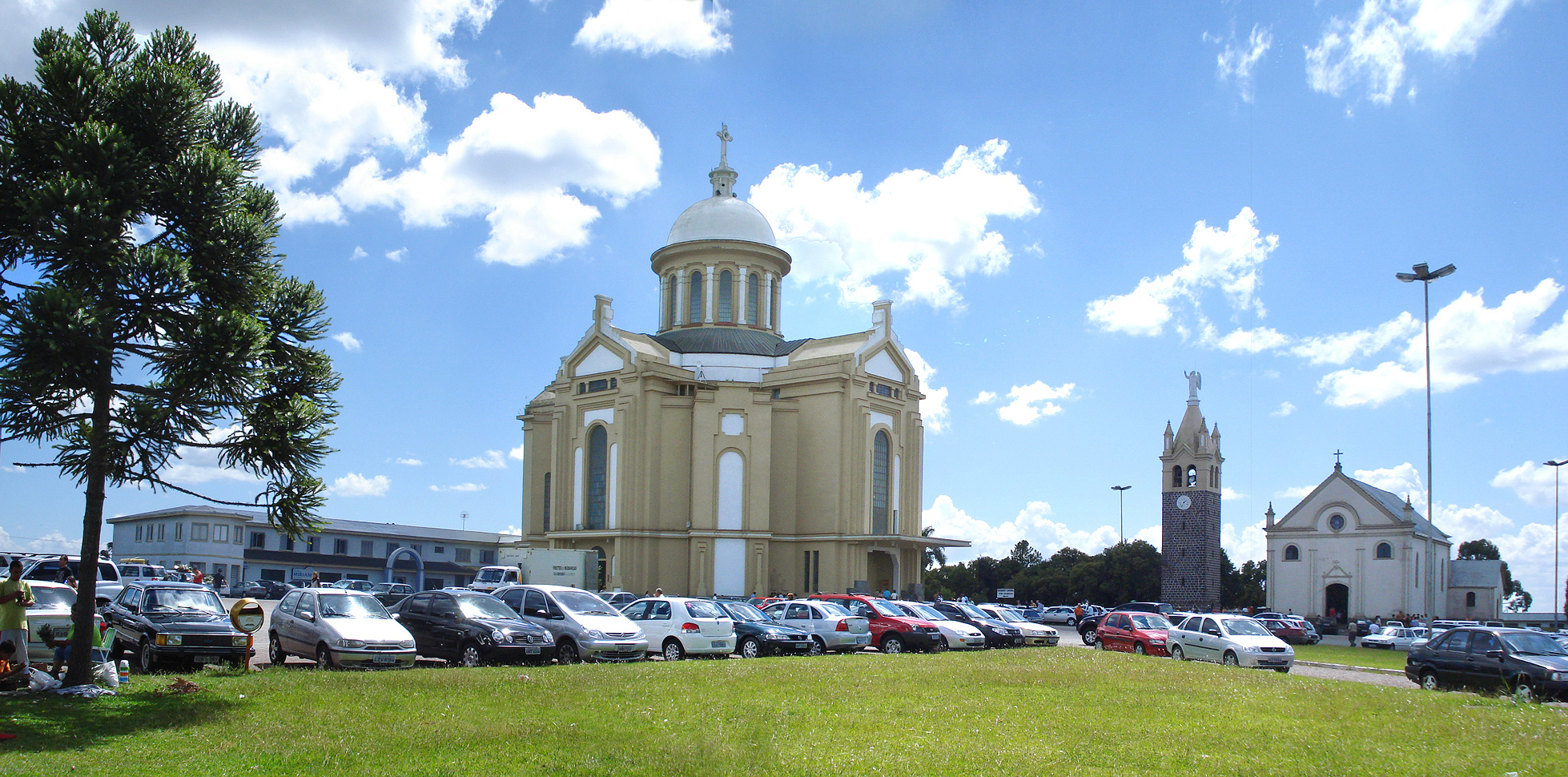
Our Lady of Caravaggio Sanctuary in Farroupilha

According to the 2022 Census, the population of Rio Grande do Sul aged over 10 declared their religion as follows: Roman Catholic (60.63%), Protestantism (21.35%), non-religious (8.82%), Umbanda and Candomblé practitioners (3.19%), Spiritists (2.86%), Indigenous traditions (0.03%), does not know or no declaration (0.08%), and other religions (3.04%).

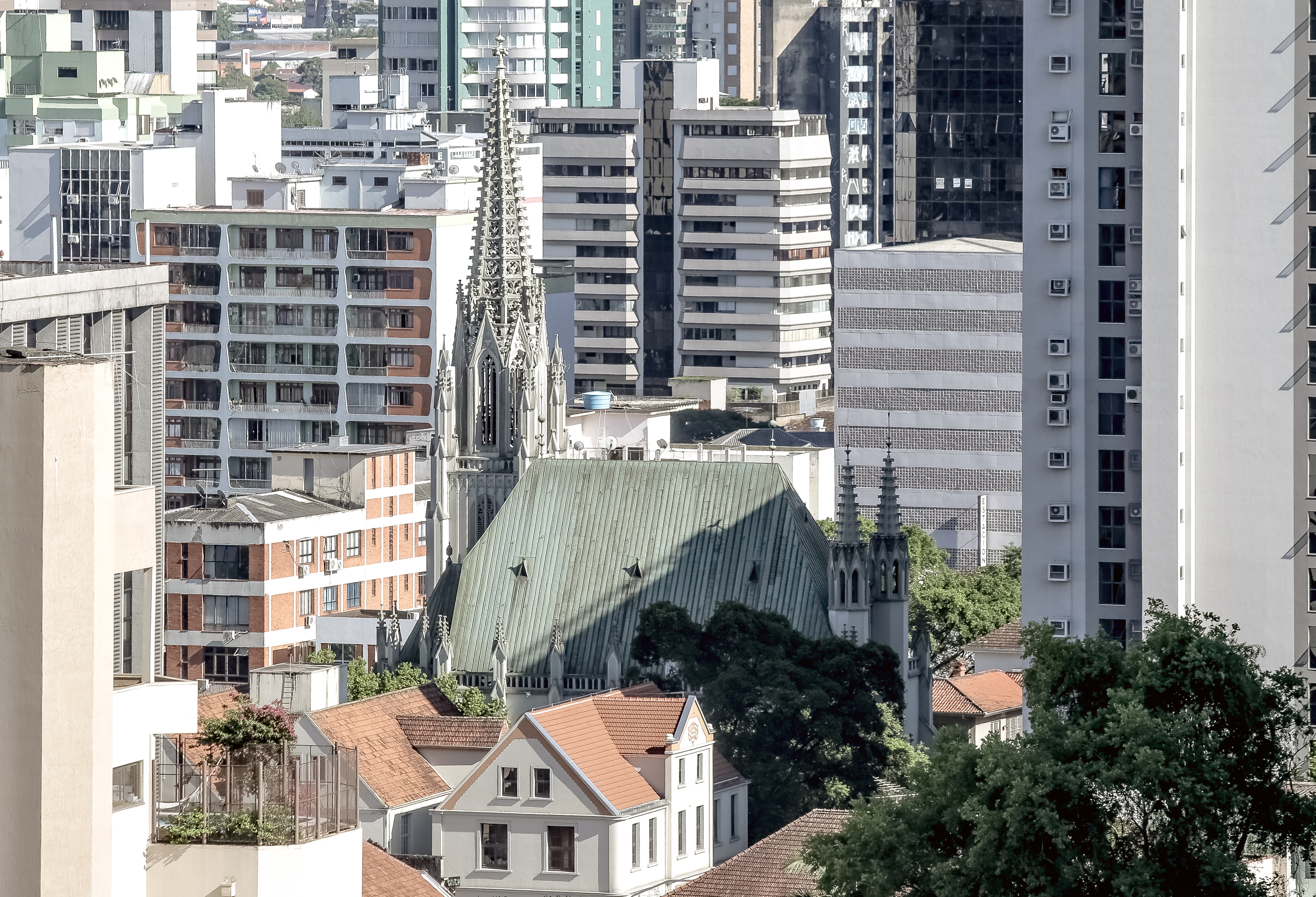
Aerial view of Lutheran Church in Novo Hamburgo

From a religious standpoint, Rio Grande do Sul is diverse. Of the ten municipalities with the highest percentages of Catholics in Brazil, nine are located in the state, including the most Catholic municipality in the country, Montauri (98.3%). Of the ten most Evangelical municipalities in Brazil by percentage, six are in Rio Grande do Sul, including the one with the highest percentage, Arroio do Padre (88.7%). The state has the highest percentage of practitioners of Umbanda and Candomblé among Brazil’s federative units, and nine of the ten municipalities with the highest number of practitioners of these religions are located in Rio Grande do Sul.

According to the territorial division of the Catholic Church in Brazil, Rio Grande do Sul belongs to the Southern Region III, and its territory is divided into four ecclesiastical provinces. These are formed by the archdioceses of Porto Alegre, which is divided into four suffragan dioceses: Caxias do Sul, Montenegro, Novo Hamburgo, and Osório; Pelotas, which is subdivided into two: Bagé and Rio Grande; Passo Fundo, subdivided into three: Erechim, Frederico Westphalen, and Vacaria; and Santa Maria, which is divided into five: Cachoeira do Sul, Cruz Alta, Santa Cruz do Sul, Santo Ângelo, and Uruguaiana.

Rio Grande do Sul also has a wide variety of Protestant or Reformed denominations. The Universal Church of the Kingdom of God, the Christian Congregation, Baptist churches, and the Assembly of God are the largest denominations. As mentioned, 18.32% of the state’s population declared themselves Evangelical, with 15.76% belonging to churches of Pentecostal origin, 8.43% to unspecified Evangelical churches, and 5.70% to mission churches.

=== Education ===
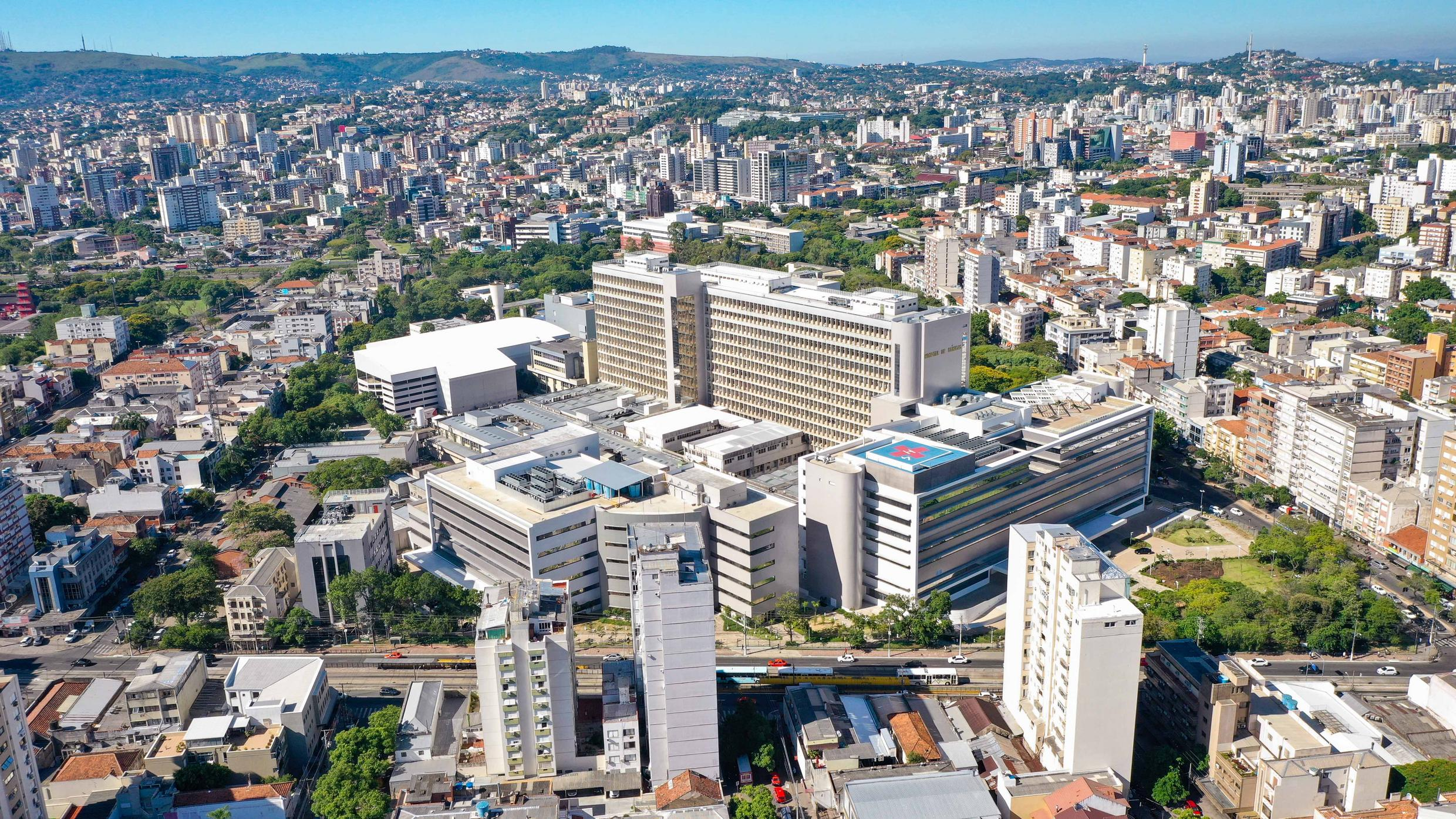
Federal University of Rio Grande do Sul Hospital is a nationwide reference, it is located in the centre of Porto Alegre.

Unisinos University in São Leopoldo.

There are more than 100 universities in the state. The largest public university is UFRGS and the largest private one is PUCRS.

In 2018, a total of 1,298,736 students were enrolled in elementary education. These students attended 5,926 elementary schools in the state of Rio Grande do Sul. Of these institutions, 5,166 were run by municipalities, 4,135 by the state government, 4 by the federal government, and 1,019 by the private sector. The teaching staff consisted of 73,770 teachers, of whom 44,018 taught in municipal schools, 31,433 in state schools, 143 in federal schools, and 12,960 in private institutions. In the same year, secondary education was provided by 1,503 schools, with 338,065 enrolled students taught by 27,771 teachers.

In 2019, the state literacy rate reached 97.4%, the fourth highest in Brazil and comparable to that of Singapore. The school attendance rate for the population aged 8 to 14 was 18.3. In 2008, 14.8% of the population of Rio Grande do Sul was considered functionally illiterate. The state’s Education Human Development Index (HDI–Education) is the eighth highest in Brazil, at 0.642.

The most important universities in the state include the Federal University of Rio Grande do Sul, the Federal University of Santa Maria, the Federal University of Pelotas, the Federal University of Health Sciences of Porto Alegre, the Federal University of Rio Grande, the University of Caxias do Sul, the University of Passo Fundo, the University of Vale do Rio dos Sinos, the Lutheran University of Brazil, Feevale University and Pontifical Catholic University of Rio Grande do Sul.

== Economy ==
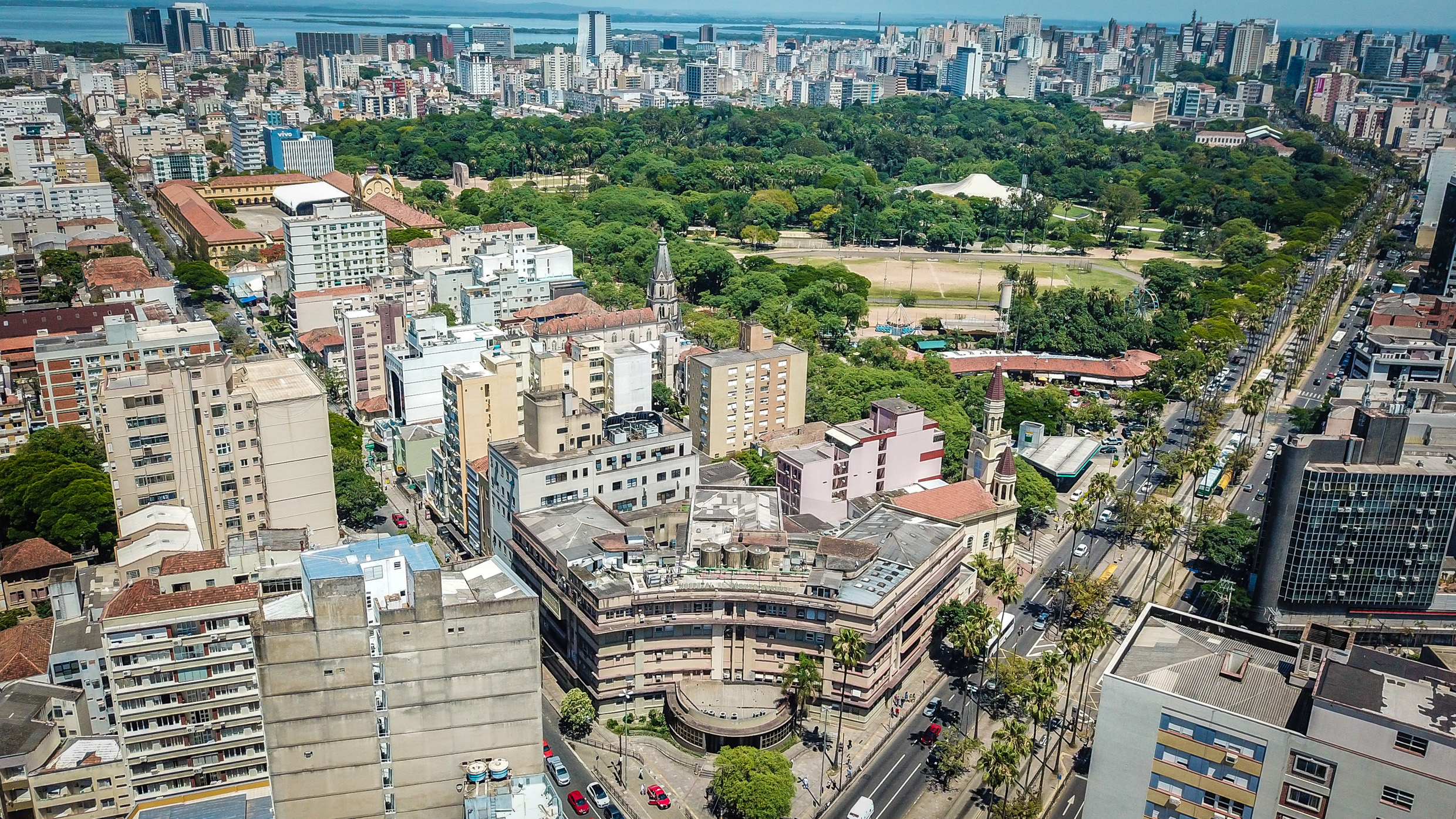
Porto Alegre, capital of Rio Grande do Sul

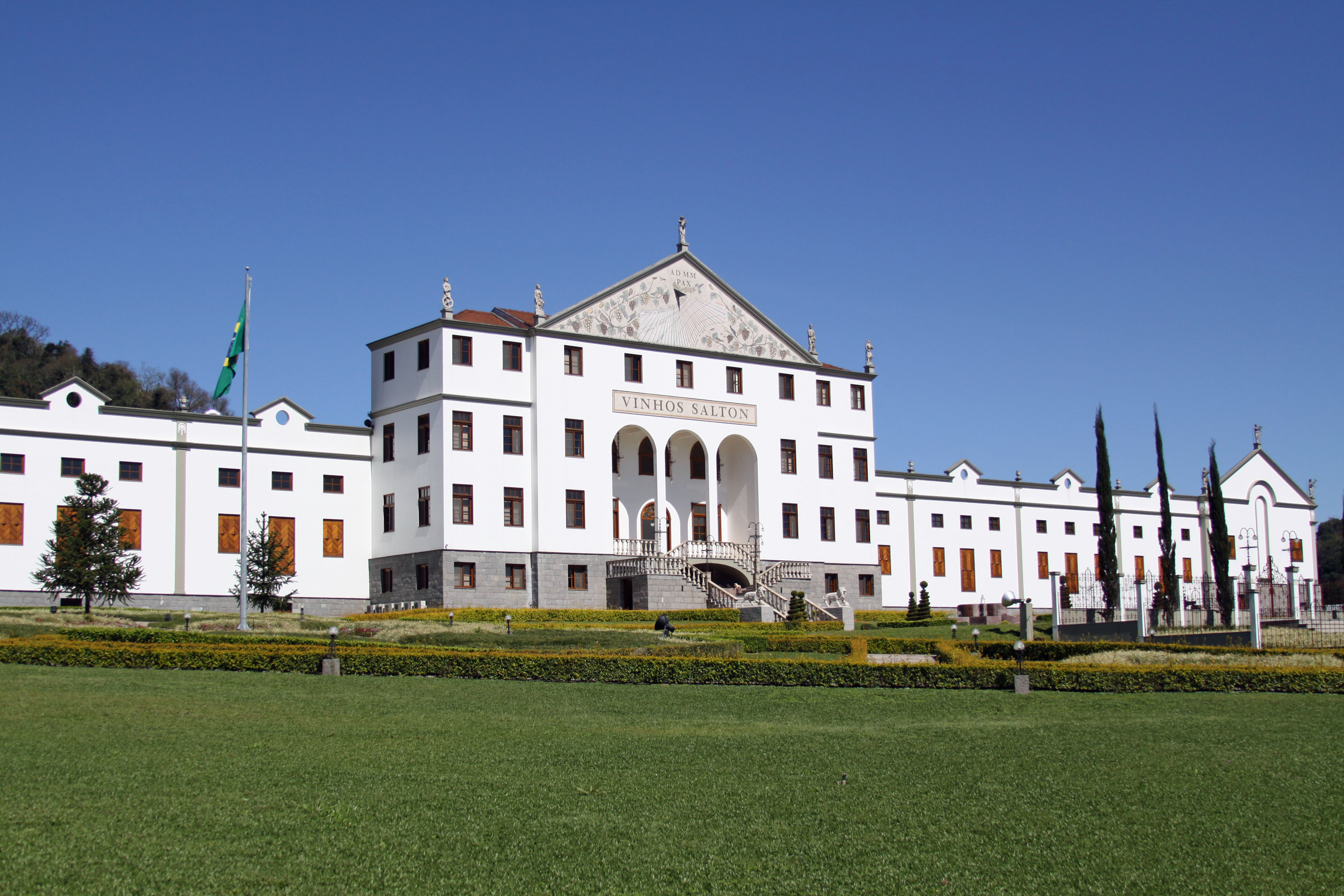
A winery in Bento Gonçalves. Rio Grande do Sul is the biggest wine producer in Brazil.

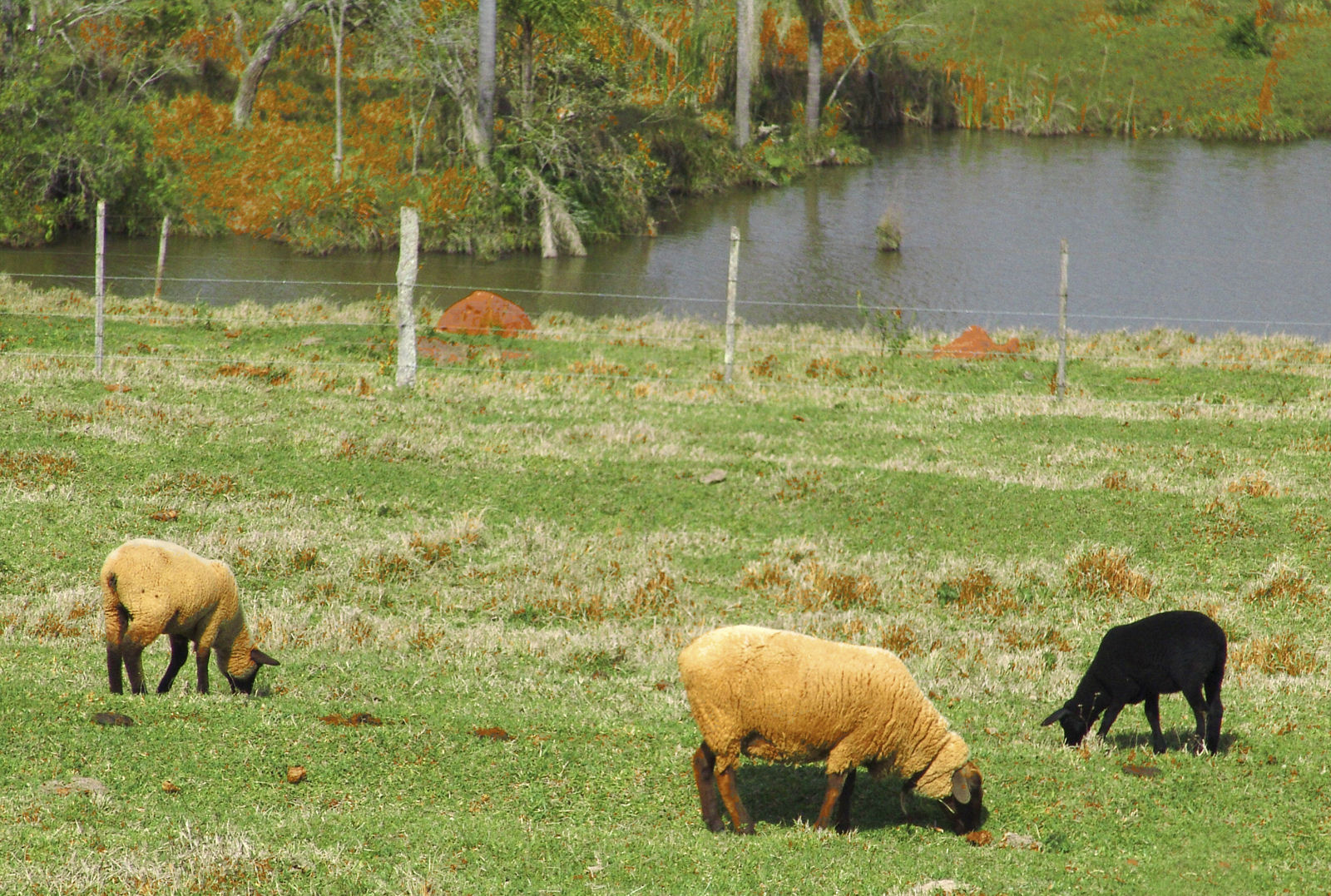
Sheep farming in Rio Grande do Sul

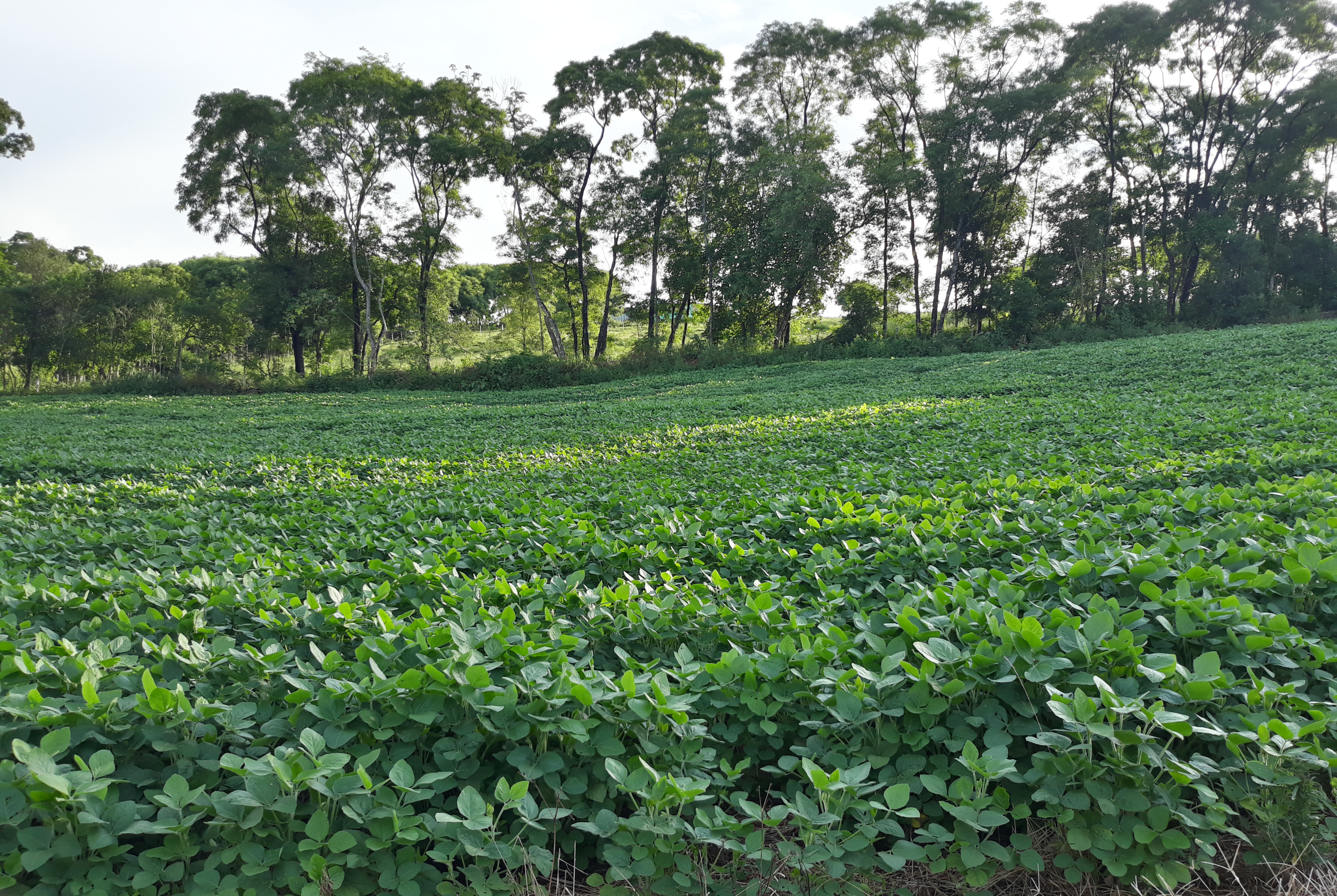
Soybean plantation in Novo Barreiro

The industrial sector is the largest component of GDP at 43%, followed by the service sector at 41%. Agriculture represents 16% of GDP (2004). Rio Grande do Sul exports: footwear 18%, soybeans 14%, tobacco 13.6%, vehicles 8%, frozen meat 7.2%, chemicals 6.8%, and leather 5% (2002).

Share of the Brazilian economy: 7% (2005).

One of the most prosperous Brazilian states, Rio Grande do Sul is known especially for its grain production, viticulture, ranching, and for its considerable industrial output.

In 1827, emigrants from Idar-Oberstein discovered the world's most important agate deposit in Rio Grande do Sul. As early as 1834, the first delivery of agate from Rio Grande do Sul had been made to Idar-Oberstein. The Brazilian agate exhibited very even layers, much more even than those seen in the local agates. This made them especially good for making engraved gems.

In agriculture, the state stands out in the production of soybeans, maize, wheat, rice, tobacco, grape, apple, cassava and yerba mate, in addition to also producing oat, barley, orange, peach, fig, tangerine, persimmon and strawberry.

In 2020, the South Region produced 32% of the national total of cereals, vegetables and oilseeds. There were 77.2 million tons, second place in Brazil, losing only to the Midwest. Rio Grande do Sul (14.3%) was the 3rd largest producer in the country.

Rio Grande do Sul is the largest producer of rice in the country, with 70.5% of Brazil's production, close to 7.3 million tons in 2020. It is also the largest producer of tobacco in Brazil, and is the largest exporter in the world. Brazil is the second largest producer in the world and leader in tobacco exports since the 1990s, with 98% of Brazilian production being carried out in the South Region. The state is responsible for 90% of the national production of grapes, and produces 90% of the wine produced in the country, 85% of the sparkling wine, and 90% of the grape juice, mainly in the area of Caxias do Sul and surroundings: 664.2 thousand tons of grape in 2018.

In soy, Rio Grande do Sul is the 3rd largest producer in the country, with about 16% of national production. It produced 19.3 million tons. In 2017, it was also 3rd largest producer of maize.

Rio Grande do Sul is also the largest national producer of wheat, with 2.3 million tons in 2019. The South Region is also the largest producer of oats in Brazil. In 2019, national production was close to 800 thousand tons, being almost all carried out in the South (Paraná and Rio Grande do Sul).

The three Southern States of the country are responsible for 95% of the national production of apple, and Santa Catarina appears at the top of the production list, disputing with Rio Grande do Sul. Rio Grande do Sul harvests 45% of Brazilian apples, and is the largest exporter of apples in the country. The region in the vicinity of Vacaria is the highlight: it concentrates 88% of the state's production and 37% of the national production.

In cassava production, Brazil produced a total of 17.6 million tons in 2018. The state was the 4th largest producer in the country, with almost 1 million tons.

About orange, Rio Grande do Sul was the 5th largest producer in Brazil in 2018, with a total of 367 thousand tons.

Rio Grande do Sul is the largest producer of peaches in Brazil, with half the volume harvested in Brazil in 2018. It is also the largest producer of fig in the country, according to data from 2018. In 2018, Rio Grande do Sul was the 3rd largest producers of tangerine in Brazil. Rio Grande do Sul is also responsible for 19% of Brazil's persimmon production, being the 2nd largest national producer. In 2019, in Brazil, there was a total production area of around 4 thousand hectares of strawberry. Rio Grande do Sul was the 3rd largest producer.

In 2019, Brazil produced about 900 thousand tons of yerba mate annually. Paraná is the largest producer in volume and Rio Grande do Sul in plantation areas (and where the sector is more industrialized). According to 2017 data, Paraná harvested 301 thousand tons of yerba mate by extractive method, while Rio Grande do Sul harvested 17 thousand tons. On the other hand, while the gauchos harvested 302 thousand tons of planted grass, the Paraná harvested 237 thousand tons in this method. The productive potential of yerba mate is still little explored in Brazil, with a good part of the harvest carried out by the extractive system and with low levels of productivity. However, many new producers are adopting more professional and efficient production systems, with technical acuity of management and globalized market vision. This tends to increase Brazil's export of this product.

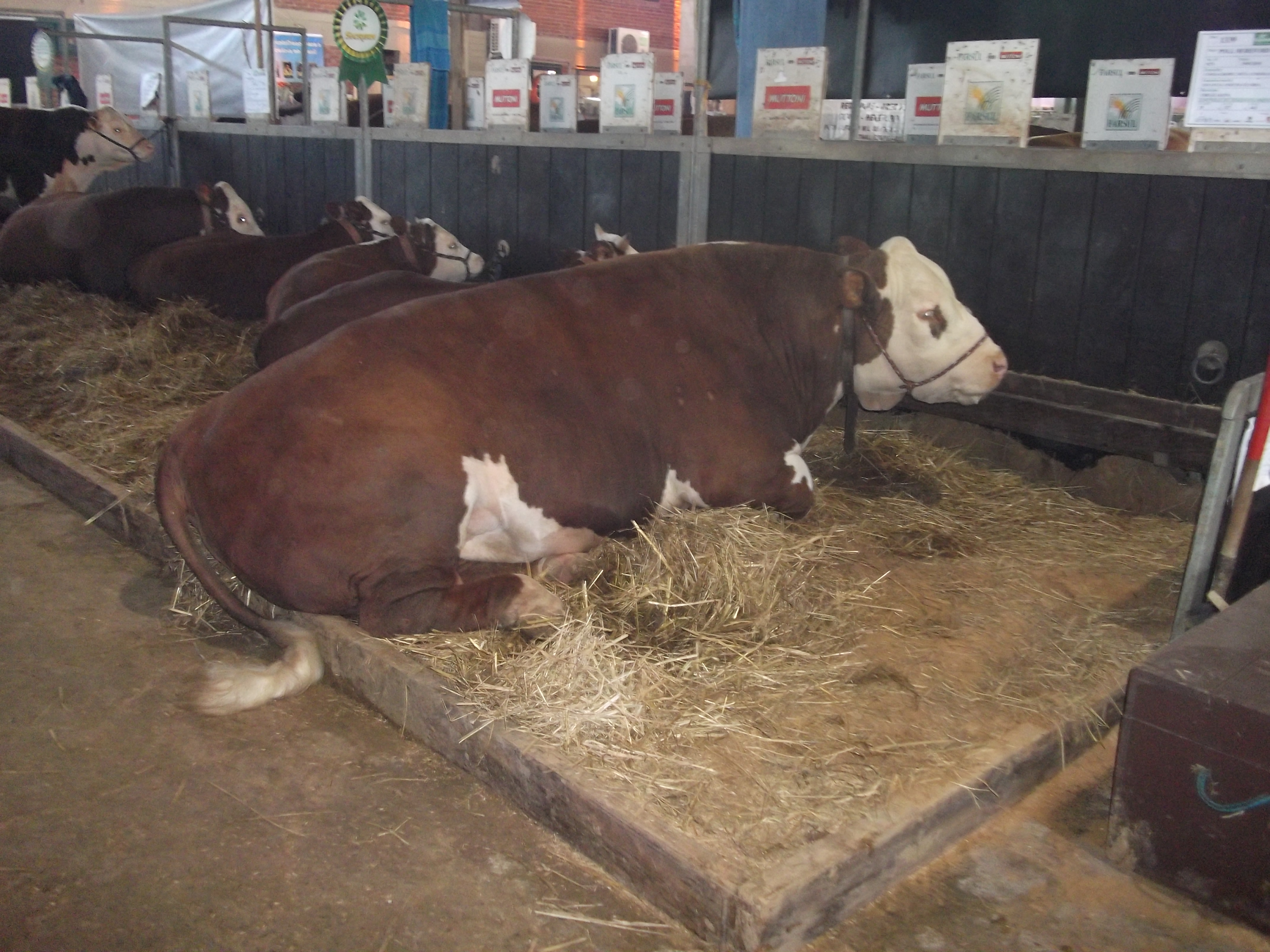
Expointer in Esteio is considered the largest livestock show in Latin America.

In 2018, the state's cattle herd was 12.5 million head, 7th place in the country, 6.5% of Brazil's cattle herd.

In 2019, Rio Grande do Sul produced a total of 4.5 billion liters of milk, making it the third largest producer in the country, with 13.0% of the country's total.

In sheep farming, in 2017 the South Region was the 2nd largest in the country, with 4.2 million heads. Rio Grande do Sul has 94% of the country's wool production.

In pork, the 3 southern states are the largest producers in the country. Brazil had 41.1 million head in 2017. Rio Grande do Sul (14.6%) is the 3rd largest producer.

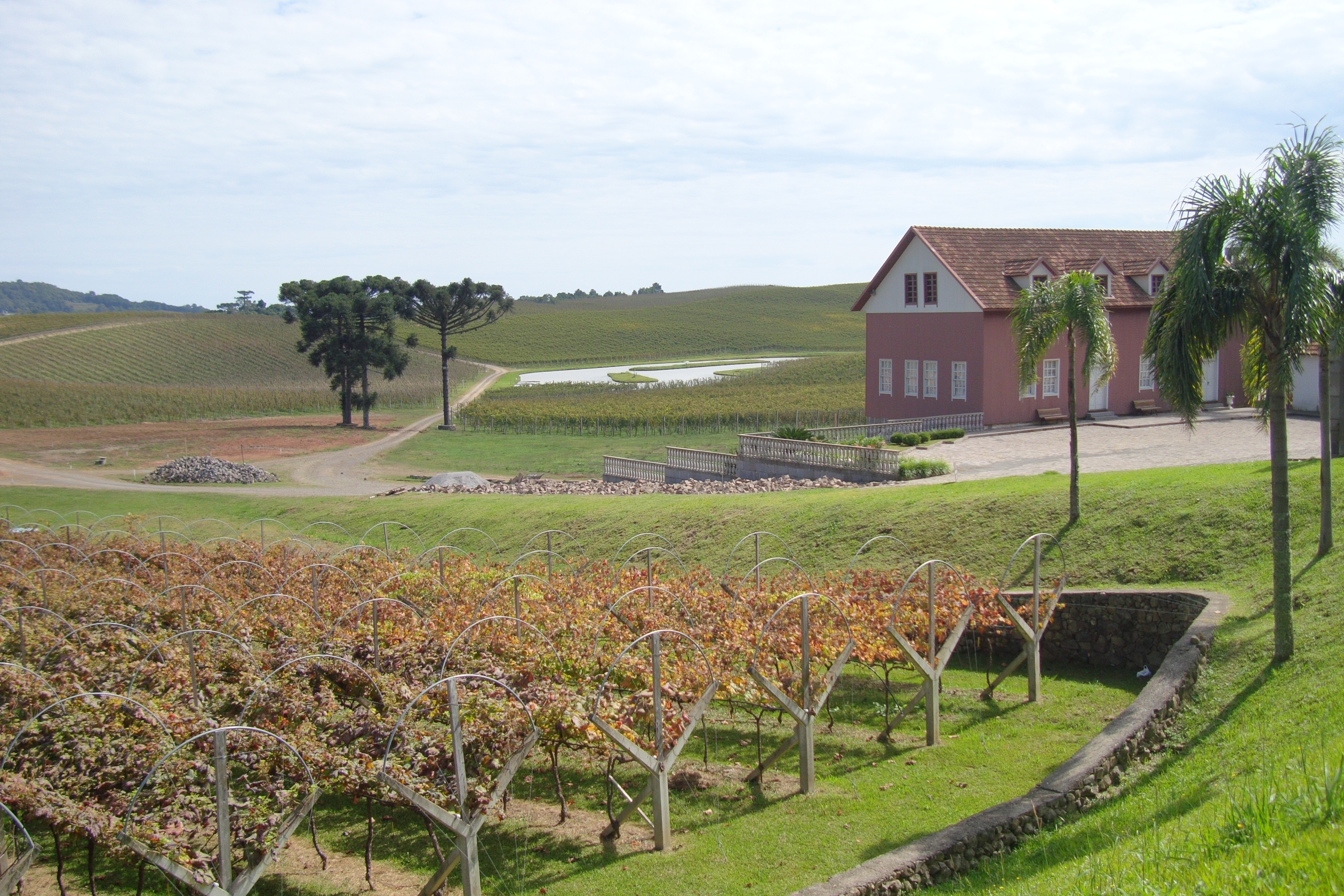
Vineyards in Flores da Cunha

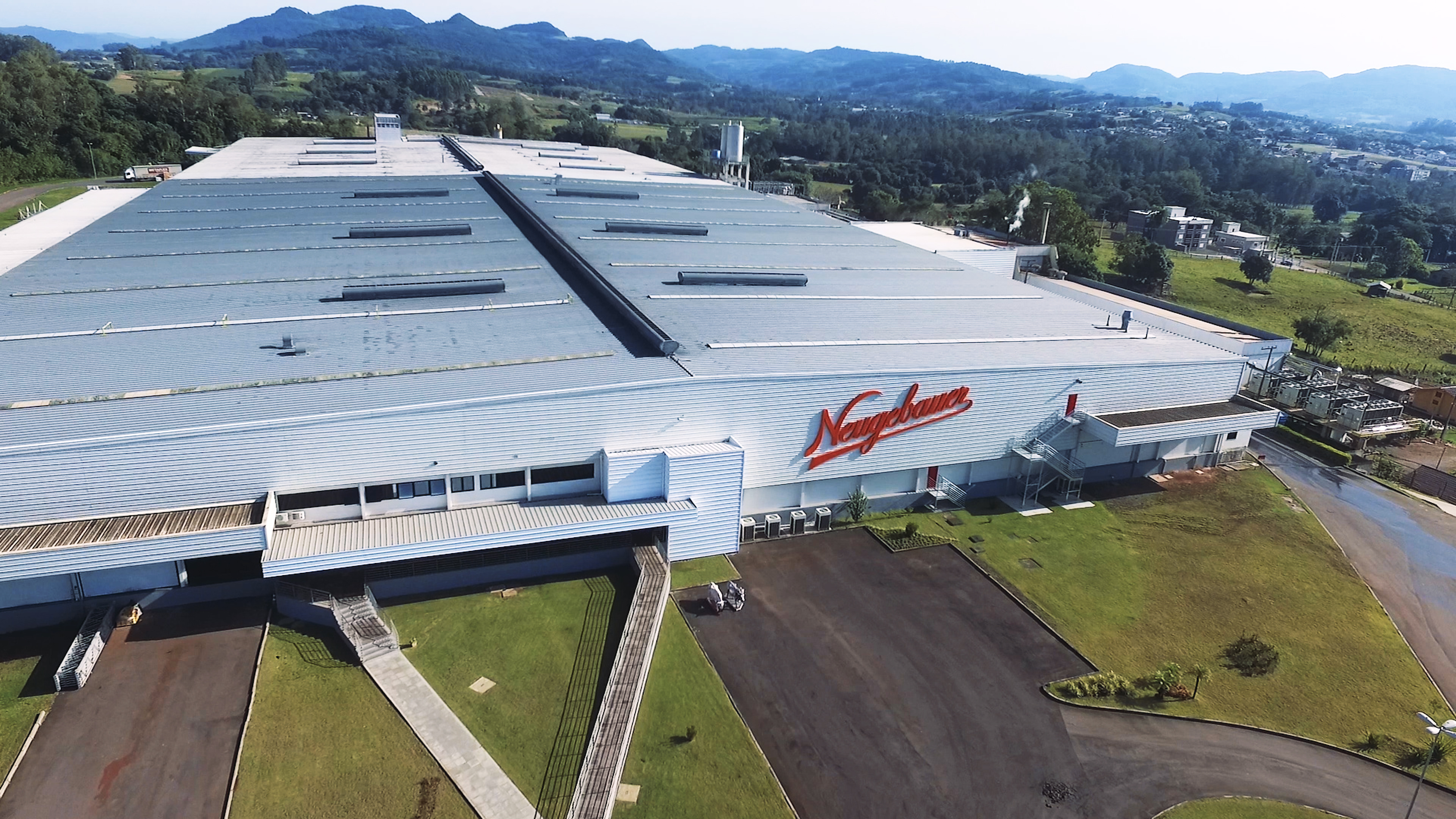
Neugebauer's headquarters in Arroio do Meio

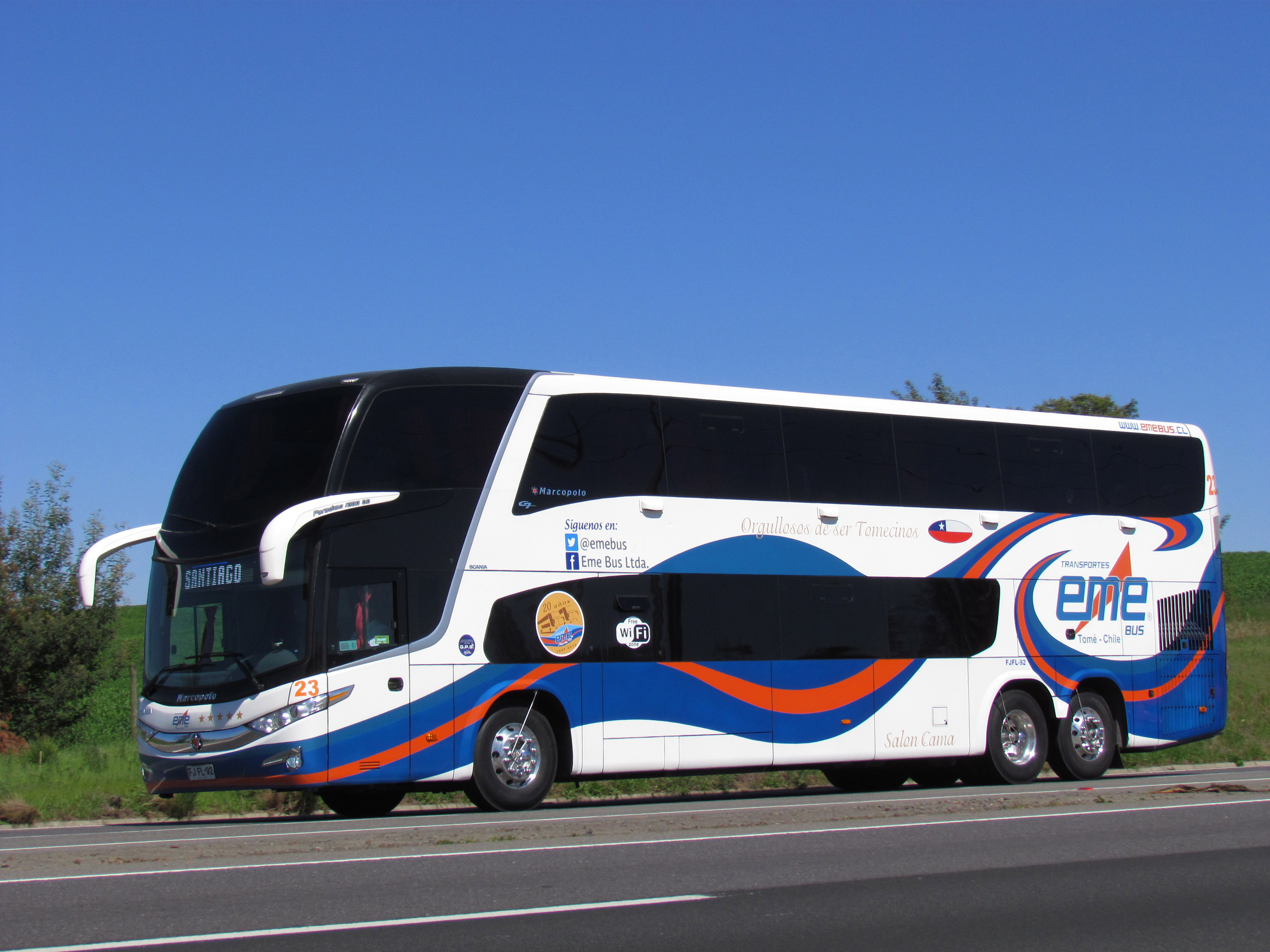
Marcopolo S.A. is a global bus and coach manufacturer with headquarters in Caxias do Sul.

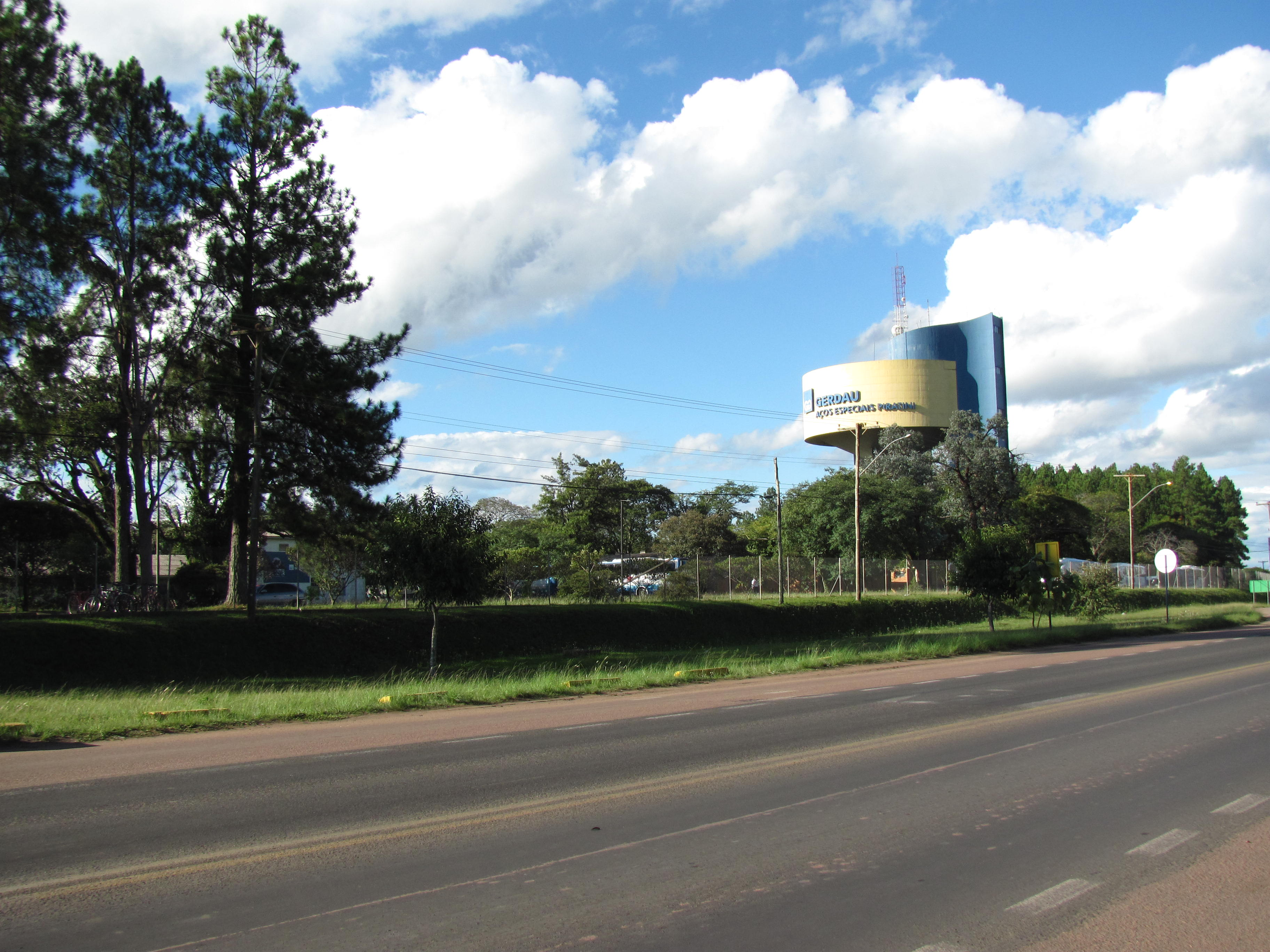
Gerdau plant in Charqueadas

The Brazilian poultry flock, in 2018, was of the order of 1.5 billion heads. In 2017, the main poultry producing states in Brazil were Paraná (25.3%), São Paulo (14.0%), and Rio Grande do Sul (11.0%). In terms of chickens, in 2017 there were 242.8 million heads in the country. Among the states that were the largest producers, São Paulo led with 21.9%, followed by Paraná (10.1%) and Rio Grande do Sul (8.8%). In the production of chicken eggs, the state ranks fifth in Brazil, with 8% of national production. There were 354 million dozen in 2018.

The South region was the main producer of honey in the country in 2017, accounting for 39.7% of the national total. Rio Grande do Sul was the largest producer in the country, with 15.2%.

Regarding mining, the state is a major producer of gemstones. Brazil is the world's largest producer of amethyst and agate, and Rio Grande do Sul is the largest producer in the country. Agate has local extraction since 1830. The largest producer of amethyst in Brazil is the city of Ametista do Sul. This stone was very rare and expensive worldwide, until the discovery of large deposits in Brazil, causing its value to drop considerably. There is also some jasper and opal in the state.

About industry, Rio Grande do Sul had an industrial GDP of R$82.1 billion in 2017, equivalent to 6.9% of the national industry. It employs 762,045 workers in the industry. The main industrial sectors are: Construction (18.2%), Food (15.4%), Industrial Public Utility Services, such as Electricity and Water (9.8%), Chemicals (6.8%), and Machinery and Equipment (6.6%). These 5 sectors concentrate 56.8% of the state's industry.

In the automotive sector, the state has a GM plant.

The leather-footwear sector (Footwear industry) stands out particularly in Novo Hamburgo, Sapiranga and Campo Bom, and in virtually all other municipalities in Vale dos Sinos. in 2019 Brazil produced 972 million pairs. Exports were around 10%, reaching almost 125 million pairs. Brazil is in the 4th position among the world producers, behind China (who produces more than 10 billion pairs), India and Vietnam, and in 11th place among the biggest exporters. The largest pole of production in Brazil is located here. The Brazilian state that most exports the product is Rio Grande do Sul: in 2019 it exported US$448.35 million. The majority of the product goes to United States, Argentina and France. Domestic consumption absorbs a large part of production. The state has or created some of the most important factories in Brazil in the sector.

In Food industry, In 2019, Brazil was the 2nd largest exporter of processed foods in the world, with a value of U $34.1 billion in exports. The Brazilian food and beverage industry's revenue in 2019 was R $699.9 billion, 9.7% of the country's Gross Domestic Product. In 2015, the industrial food and beverage sector in Brazil comprised 34,800 companies (not counting bakeries), the vast majority of which were small. These companies employed more than 1,600,000 workers, making the food and beverage industry the largest employer in the manufacturing industry. There are around 570 large companies in Brazil, which concentrate a good part of the total industry revenue. Rio Grande do Sul created food companies of national importance such as the Neugebauer chocolate factory; Vinícola Aurora and Vinícola Salton, two of the largest wineries in the country. and Camil Alimentos, which owns the brand Açúcar União, Arroz Carretero, among others.

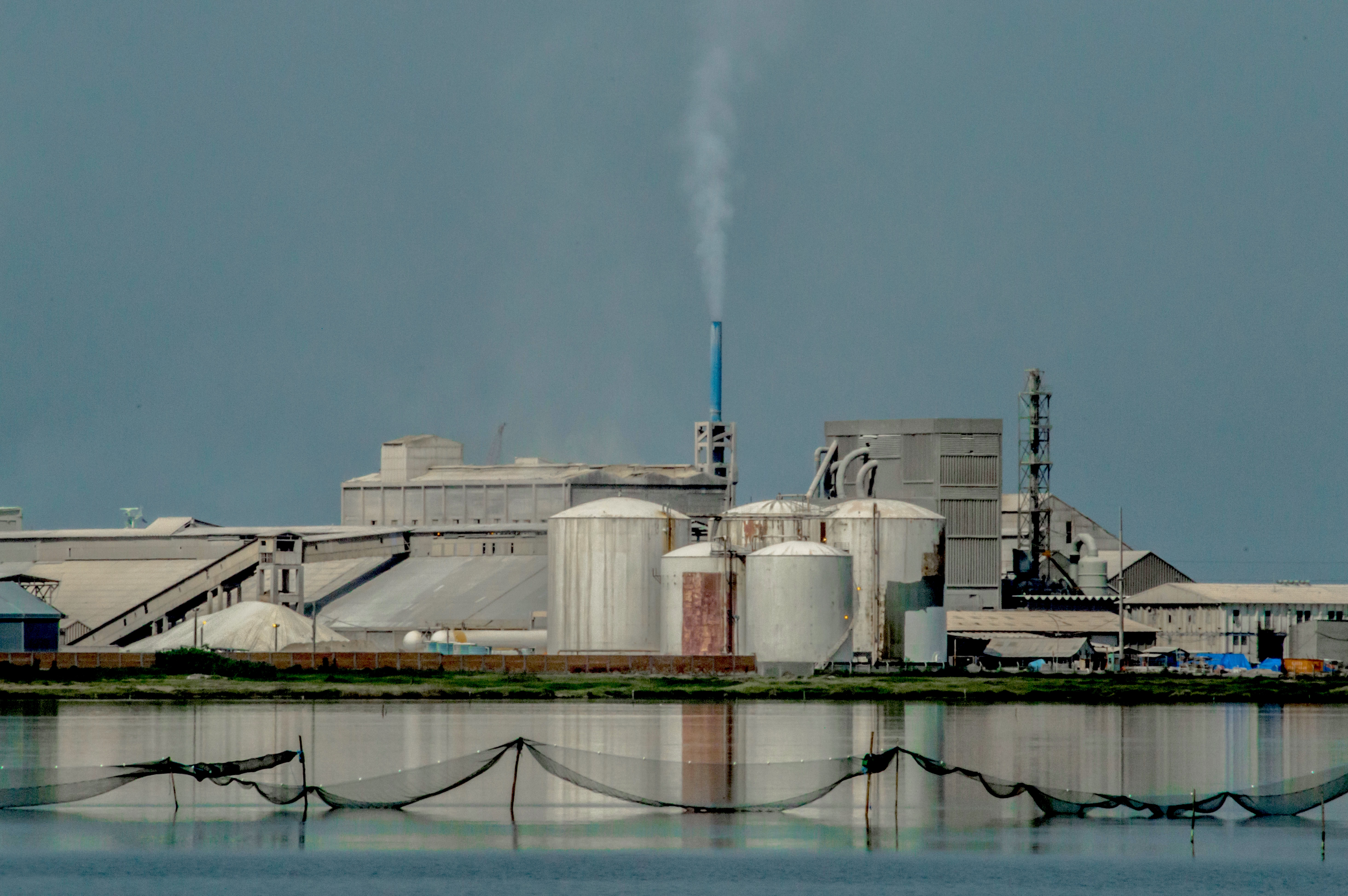
Fertilizer industry in Rio Grande

The mechanical and metallurgical industry also reach considerable expression, especially in Porto Alegre, Novo Hamburgo, São Leopoldo and Canoas, in addition to Gravataí, Sapucaia do Sul, Esteio and Sapiranga, which have large companies in the sector and which also belong to the Metropolitan Region of Porto Alegre. These centers are joined by São Jerônimo, which houses the Charqueadas steel plant. The steel mill Aços Finos Piratini is located in Charqueadas, which belongs to Gerdau. It is geared mainly to serve the automotive industry.

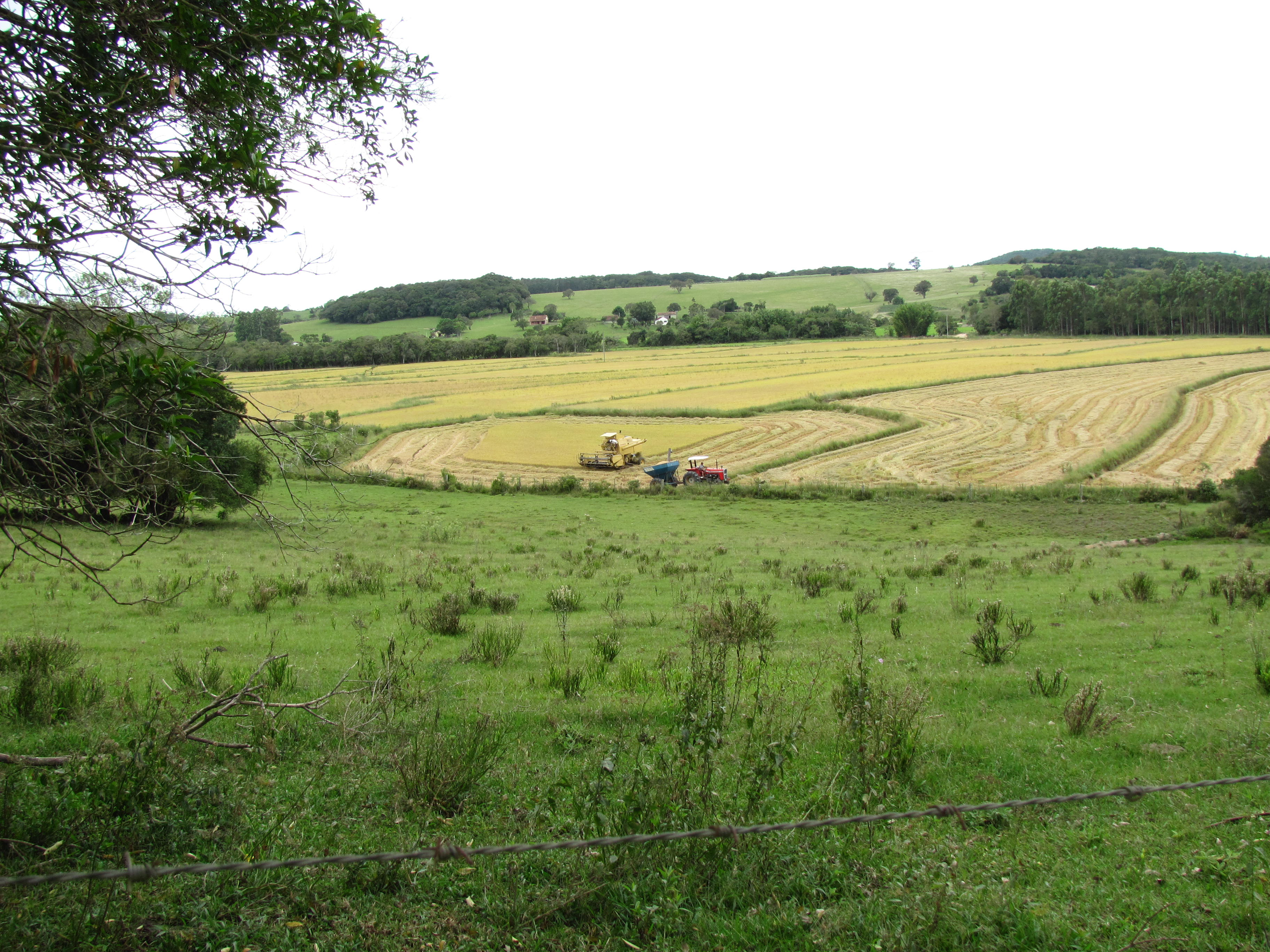
Rice farming in Mariana Pimentel

In the metallurgical business, Tramontina, originally from Rio Grande do Sul manufactures knives, pans, shovels and various utensils, employs more than 8,500 people and has 10 manufacturing units. Other companies in the state are Marcopolo, a manufacturer of bus bodies, which had a market value of R $2.782 billion in 2015, and Randon, a group of 9 companies specialized in solutions for the transportation, which brings together manufacturers of vehicles, auto parts, and road equipment – employs around 11,000 people and recorded gross sales in 2017 of R $4.2 billion.

Another industrial area is the so-called old colonization region, in which the municipalities of Caxias do Sul, Garibaldi, Bento Gonçalves, Flores da Cunha, Farroupilha and Santa Cruz do Sul are integrated. The manufacturing activity is marked by the production of wine and processing of agropastoral products, such as leather, lard, maize, wheat and tobacco.

In the rest of the state there are several dispersed industrial centers, all linked to the processing of agropastoral raw materials. In this group, Erechim, Passo Fundo, Santa Maria, Santana do Livramento, Rosário do Sul, Pelotas, Rio Grande and Bagé stand out.

== Infrastructure ==
=== Highways ===
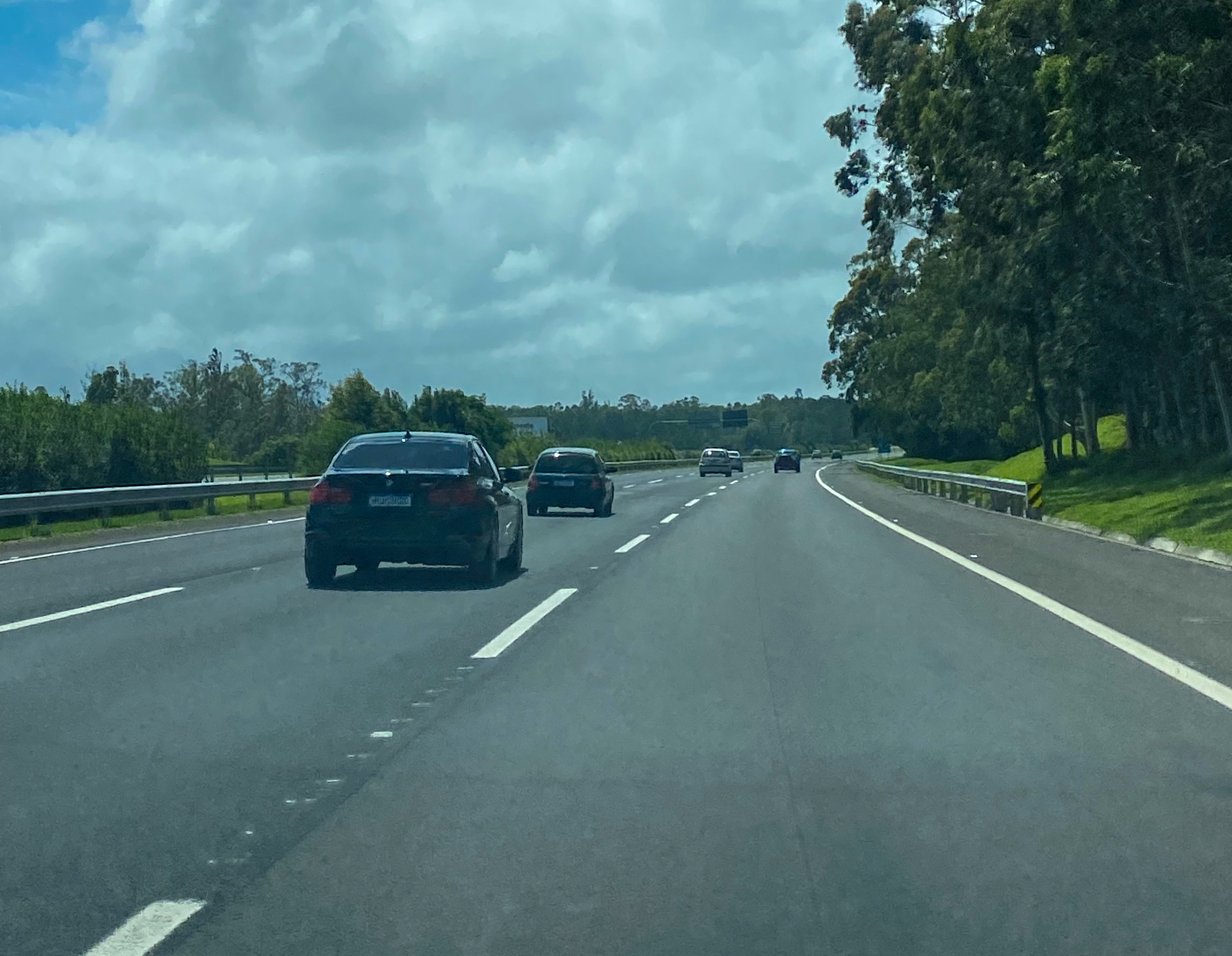
BR-290 near Porto Alegre

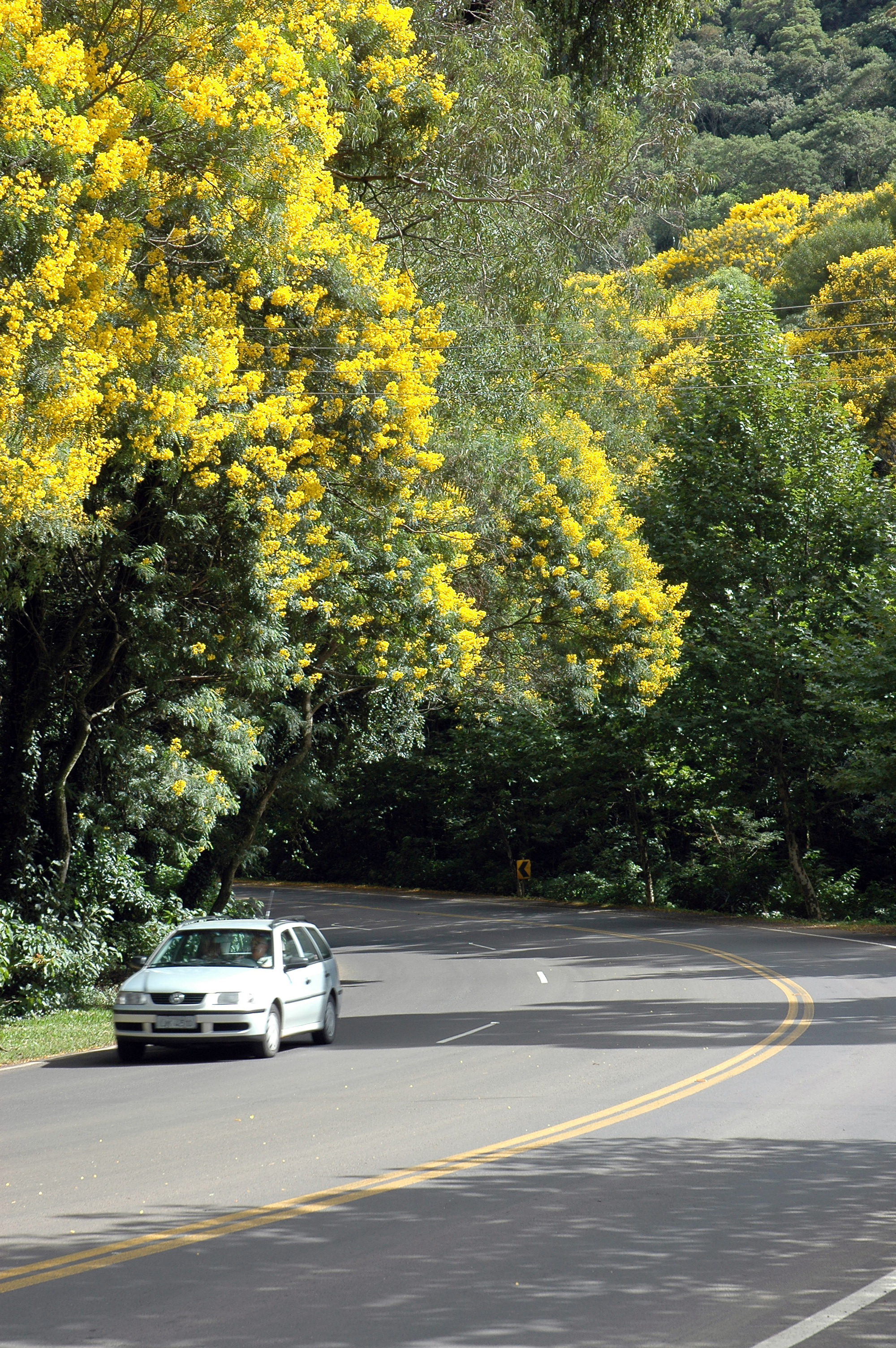
BR-116 Highway in Ivoti

The state has 153,960 km of highways, under national, state or municipal jurisdiction. The main highways are: BR-101, BR-116, BR-153, BR-158, BR-163, BR-285, BR-287, BR-290, BR-293, BR-386, BR-392 and BR-471. After decades of meager investments by successive State Governments, Rio Grande do Sul currently has a deficient road network and one of the worst in the southern half of the country: in 2020, there were still 54 cities without asphalt access (São Paulo, Rio de Janeiro, Santa Catarina and Mato Grosso do Sul had 100% of cities with asphalt access at the same time, Paraná and Minas Gerais had almost 100%). The State also has few duplicated highways, roughly in the vicinity of the capital Porto Alegre, most of which belong to the Federal Government; despite the large number of state highways, the State Government did little in this field. The situation only began to change in 2019, when the State carried out an economic and financial reorganization plan, and launched a specific program aimed at recovering and evolving the state's road network. This year, 62 municipalities still did not have access to asphalt: the project was to arrive in 2023 with 22 cities without access. Highway concessions held by Rio Grande do Sul, such as BR-287 and BR-386, carried out at the same time, aim to double the granted portions of these highways by 2035. Currently, 211 km of the BR-116 between Guaíba and Pelotas are being duplicated, and in 2022 there were already 148 km duplicated.

=== Ports ===
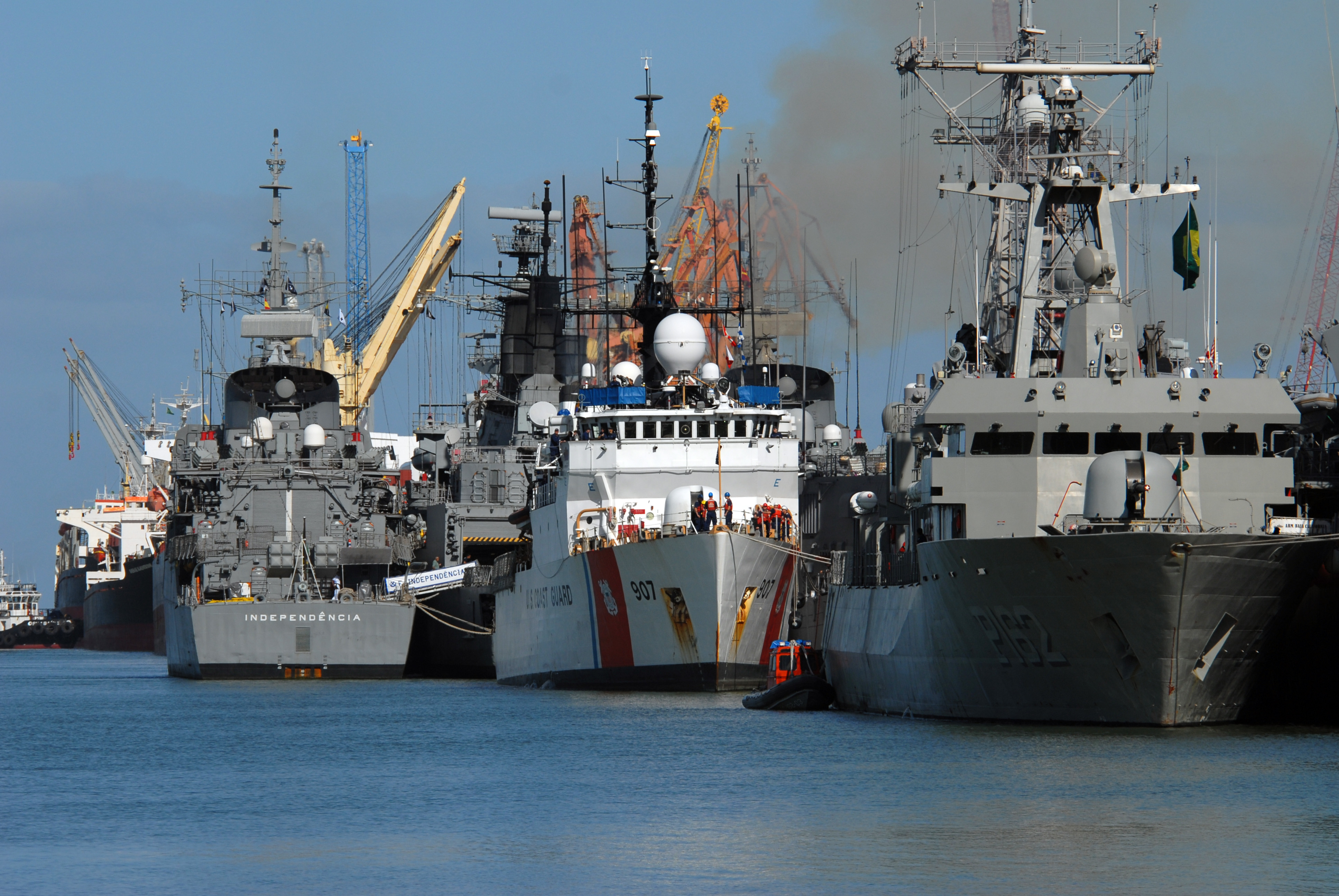
Port of Rio Grande

The Port of Rio Grande is of great importance for Mercosur, and also the main point of multimodality in the state, causing part of the road and rail system to focus on the Port of Rio Grande. The main ports are: Port of Rio Grande, Port of Porto Alegre, Port of Pelotas and Port of Estrela. The port terminals of Rio Grande, Porto Alegre and Pelotas handled, in 2021, 47.6 million tons of cargo, 45.18 million in the Port of Rio Grande alone.

=== International airports ===
==== Porto Alegre ====
With 37.6 thousand square meters of constructed area and four levels, the passenger terminal at Salgado Filho International Airport can receive 28 large airplanes simultaneously. The terminal has 32 check-in counters, ten boarding bridges, nine elevators and ten escalators. It has a totally automated aircraft movement control center and the main spaces are air conditioned.

The apron, surfaced with prestressed concrete, can serve jumbo jets like the Boeing 747-400.

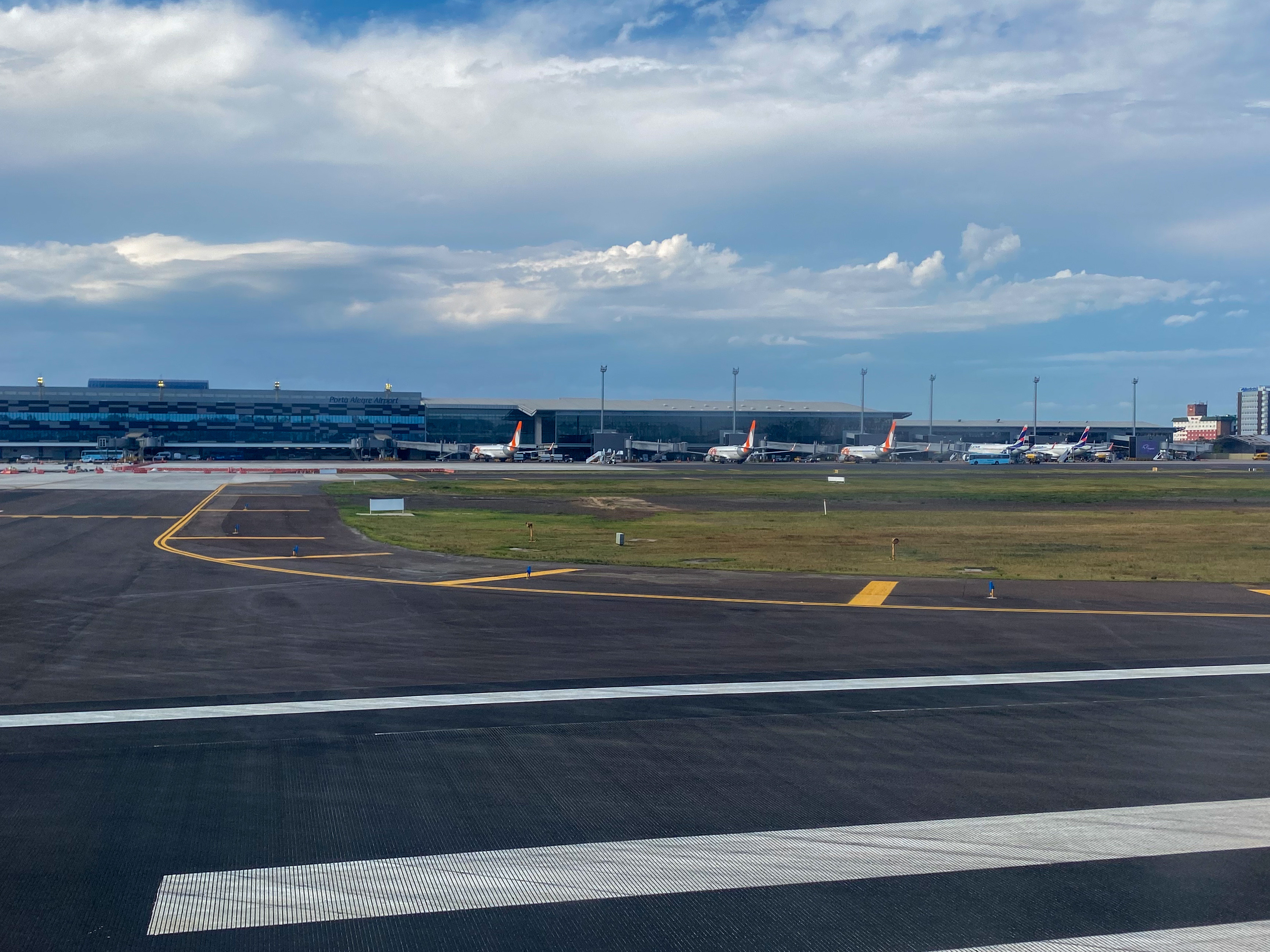
Salgado Filho International Airport

The garage structure has eight levels, 44 thousand square meters and 1,440 parking spaces. Another terminal, with 15 thousand square meters and capacity for 1.5 million passengers a year, serves general, executive and third-tier aviation (conventional piston-engine and turboprop planes). Porto Alegre Airport was the first one administered by Infraero to have integrated check-in. This service offers flexibility in use of terminal facilities and installations, enabling carriers to access their own data centers via shared-use computers from any check-in counter position. This makes it much easier to allocate counter space according to demand fluctuations, making for less idle space. The Aeroshopping area – a center for commerce and leisure – operates 24 hours a day with shops, services, a food court, along with a triplex cinema, the first to be established at a Brazilian airport. Salgado Filho International Airport also has an air cargo terminal, built in 1974, with 9,500 thousand square meters of area and capacity to handle 1,500 tons of export cargo and 900 tons of imports each month. The average daily movement (arrivals and departures) is 174 aircraft, flying scheduled routes connecting Porto Alegre directly or indirectly to all the country's other major cities, as well as smaller cities in the interior of the states of the South Region and São Paulo. There are also international flights with direct connections to cities of the Southern Cone.

==== Pelotas ====
The Pelotas International Airport is commonly used by the Brazilian Air Force as the last stop in Brazil on its flights to the Brazilian Antarctic Base.

==== Bagé ====
Comandante Gustavo Kraemer Airport opened on July 5, 1946. This airport came under Infraero administration on October 27, 1980. It is located on the rural outskirts of Bagé, 60 km (37 mi) from the Uruguayan border and 380 km (236 mi) from Porto Alegre. Comandante Gustavo Kraemer Airport does not operate with scheduled commercial flights. There are two daily flights carrying bank pouches, as well as air taxi services and executive jets. Most of the airport's users are businesspeople from the central part of Brazil who have interests in the region in breeding thoroughbred English and Arabian horses, cattle ranching, fruit growing, wine making, wood pulp and power generation.

==== Uruguaiana ====
Located on the border with Argentina (across the Uruguay River from the Argentine city of Paso de los Libres), Uruguaiana is considered the major inland port in Latin America, thanks to its strategic position with the countries of Mercosur. Rubem Berta International Airport, however, has only one flight, on Azul Brazilian Airlines, to Porto Alegre, – a situation Infraero intends to change, as was confirmed in an official visit to the airport in December 2004.

With more than 700 thousand square meters of constructed area, it is the largest airport in the interior of the state of Rio Grande do Sul.

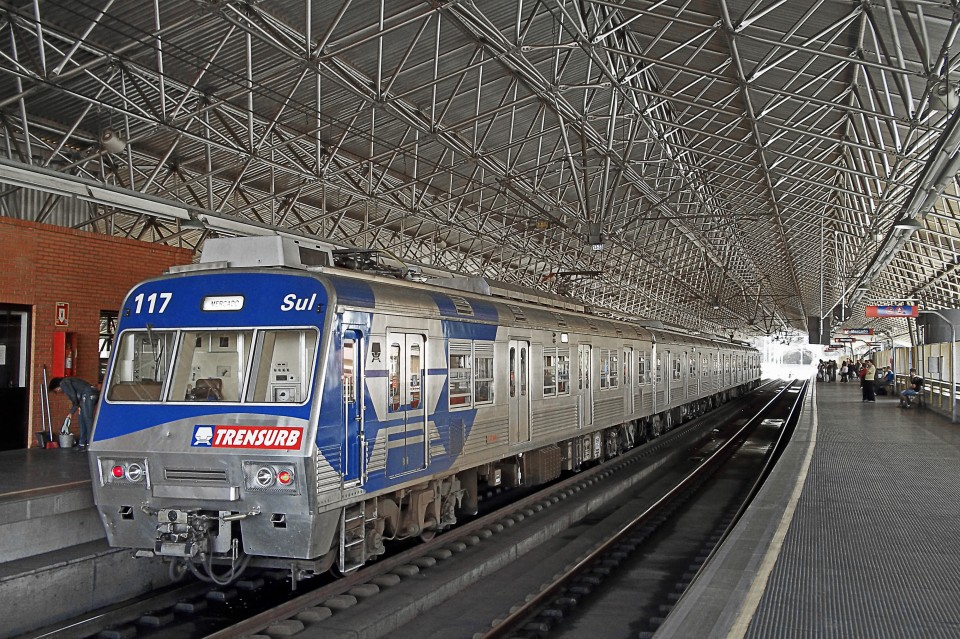
Great Porto Alegre Metro System in São Leopoldo

There are two highways, BR-290 and BR-472, running near the airport, besides a railroad line about 2,500 meters from the terminal. Located 9 km (6 mi) from the city center, this airport is at an elevation of 78 meters and the average annual temperature is 20C, with a good deal of variation from summer to winter. Located 630 km (391 mi) from the state capital (Porto Alegre), Uruguaiana was founded on May 29, 1746, and has a current population of 126,936. Farming and ranching are the main economic activities of the region, which has 1,509 rural properties.

=== National airports ===
==== Caxias do Sul ====
Hugo Cantergiani Airport (CXJ/SBCX) serves a vast region of important economical and touristic counties in the vicinities of Caxias do Sul, totalling 34 municipalities in this area of the "Serra Gaúcha". It is located at an altitude of 754 m (2 474 ft) as has one concrete runway (15/33) with the length of 2 000 m (6 562 ft) although only 1.650 m are usable if landing on runway 15. It is served on a daily basis by GOL and Azul airlines linking Caxias do Sul to São Paulo. It is equipped with a VASIS visual approach aid and is also certified for IFR approaches. References to these informations are published in the Portuguese version of this site.

=== Energy ===
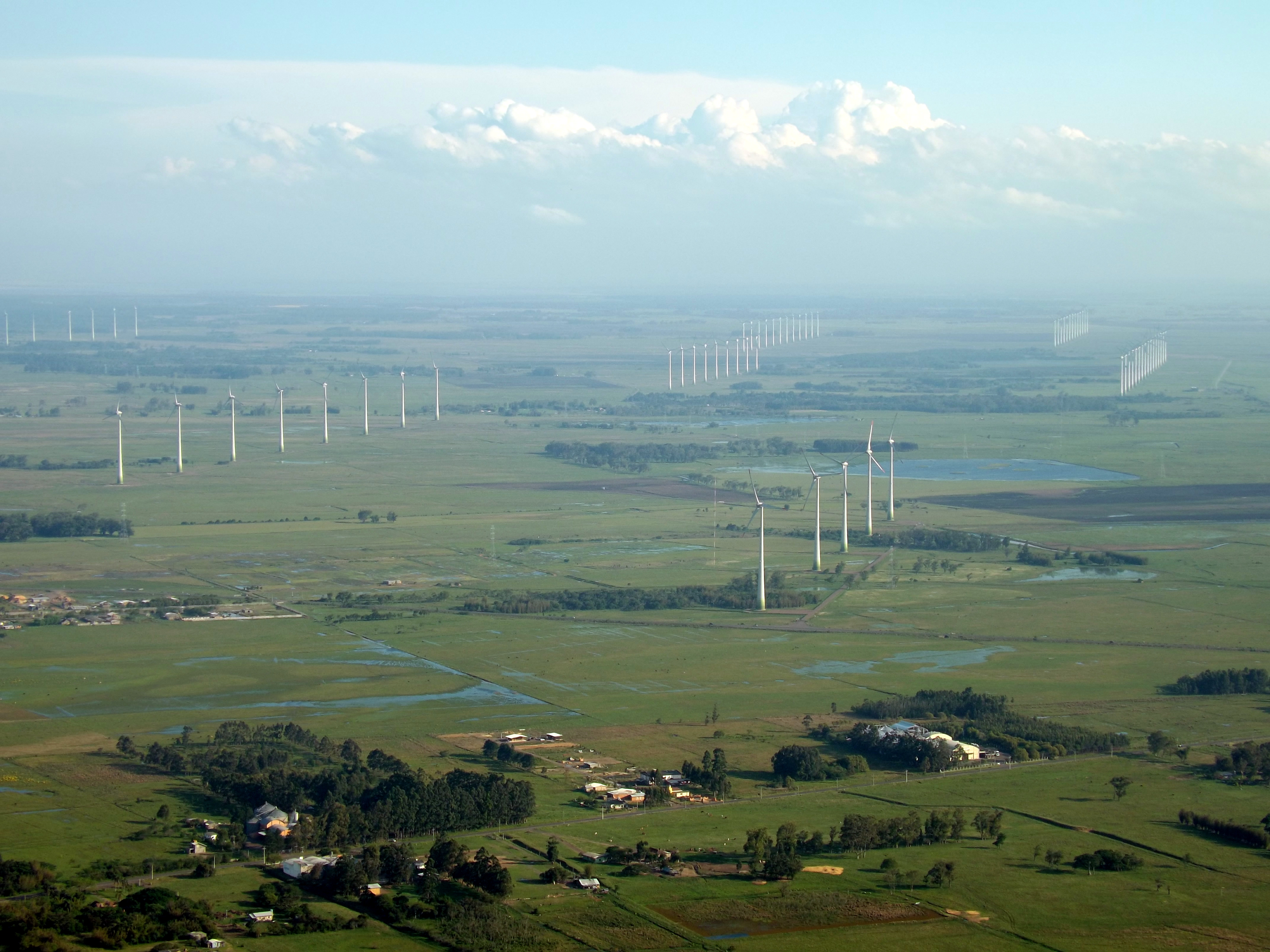
Osório wind farm is the largest wind power park in Latin America.

In 2021, Rio Grande do Sul had around 7.2 GW of installed electrical power, a relatively low number compared to the country's total, which was around 170 GW at the time. Of the total, 80.6% came from renewable sources - 49% corresponded to hydroelectric plants, 19.5% to wind energy and 8.2% to photovoltaic solar energy. The state has high potential for wind power installation due to the average wind speed being one of the highest in the country. There are currently several projects for new wind farms in progress, in addition to investments in the state's power transmission lines, which were limited. Most projects for offshore wind energy in Brazil, in 2021, were in Rio Grande do Sul, with installation scheduled for 2030.

In March 2022, Rio Grande do Sul was the 3rd Brazilian state with the most solar energy installed in the individual distributed micro generation modality.

The production of crude mineral coal in Brazil was 13.6 million tons in 2007. Santa Catarina produced 8.7 Mt (million tons); Rio Grande do Sul, 4.5 Mt; and Paraná, 0.4 Mt. Brazil has reserves of peat, lignite and hard coal. Coal totals 32 billion tons of reserves and is mainly in Rio Grande do Sul (89.25% of the total). The Candiota Deposit (in Rio Grande do Sul) alone has 38% of all national coal. As it's a coal of inferior quality, it's used only in the generation of thermoelectric energy and at the site of the deposit. The oil crisis in the 1970s led the Brazilian government to create the Energy Mobilization Plan, with intense research to discover new coal reserves. The Geological Survey of Brazil, through works carried out in Rio Grande do Sul and Santa Catarina, greatly increased the reserves of coal previously known, between 1970 and 1986 (mainly between 1978 and 1983). Good quality coal, suitable for use in metallurgy and in large volume (seven billion tons), was then discovered in several deposits in Rio Grande do Sul (Morungava, Chico Lomã, Santa Teresinha), but at relatively great depths (up to 1,200 m), which has hindered its use until now. In 2011, coal accounted for only 5.6% of the energy consumed in Brazil, but it is an important strategic source, which can be activated when, for example, the water levels in the dams are very low, reducing excessively the supply of hydroelectric power.

== Culture ==
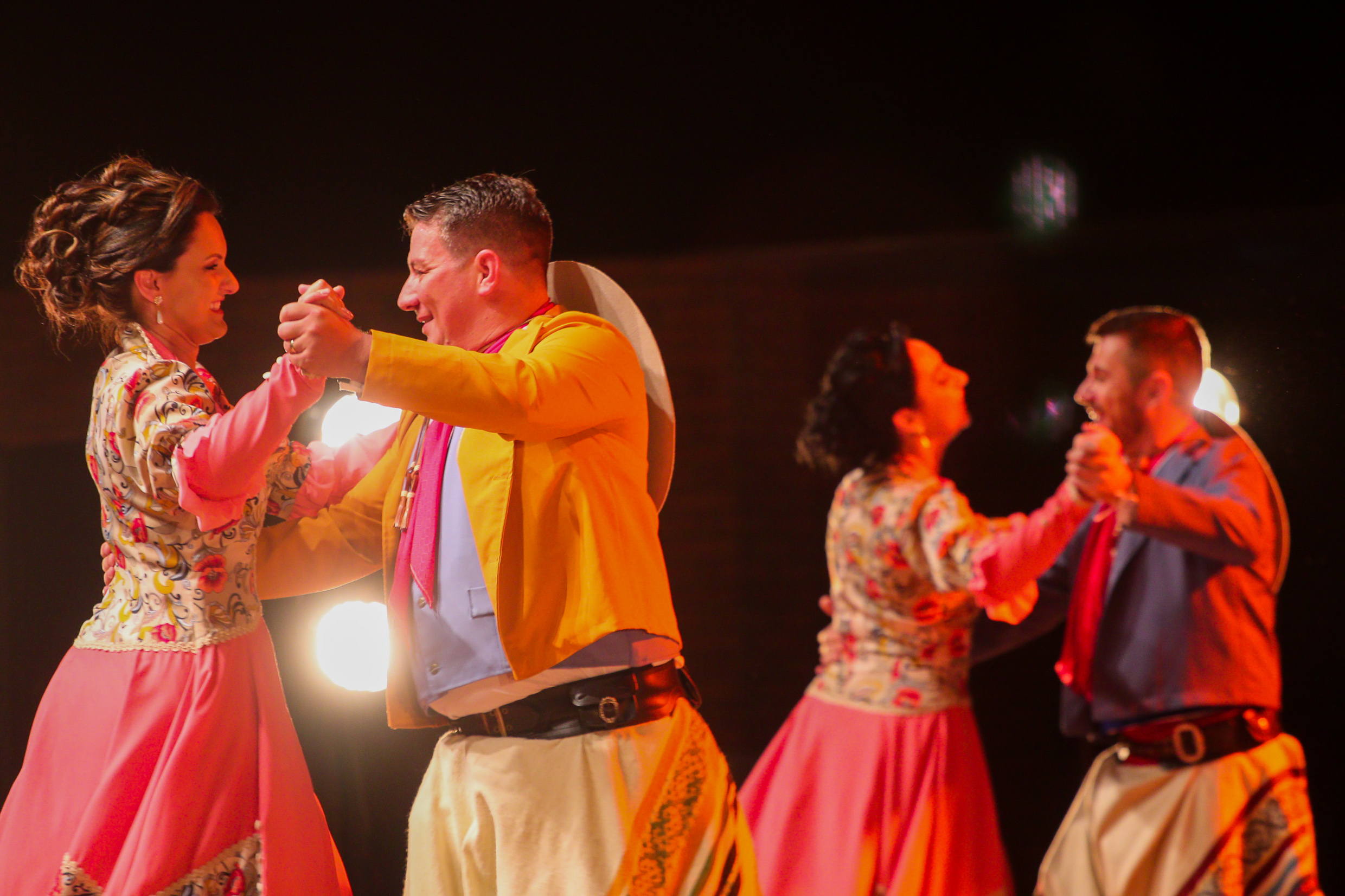
A typical dance from the gaucho culture of Rio Grande do Sul.

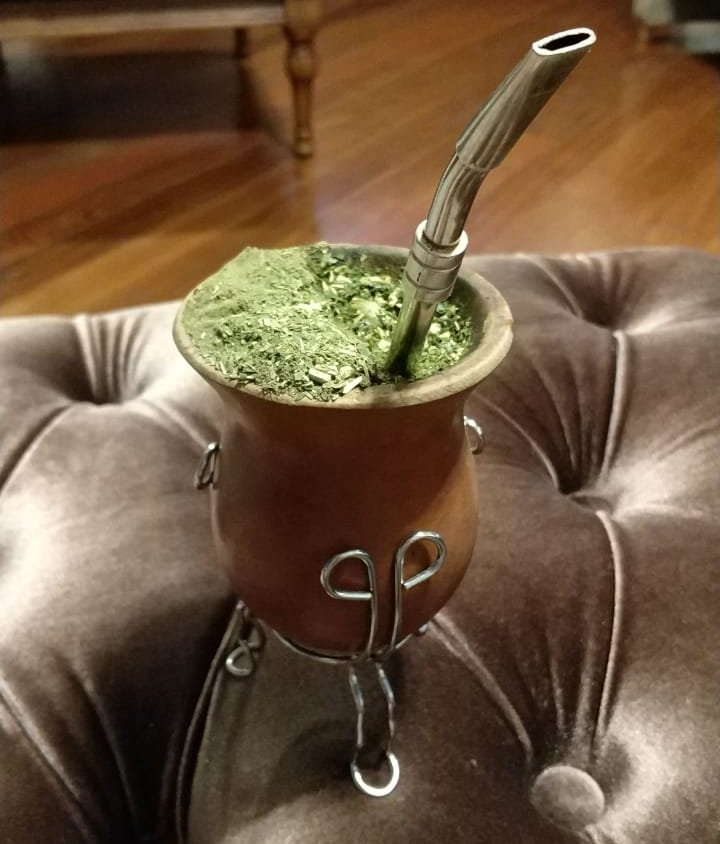
Chimarrão is a traditional drink made by soaking dried leaves of the holly species Ilex paraguariensis in hot water

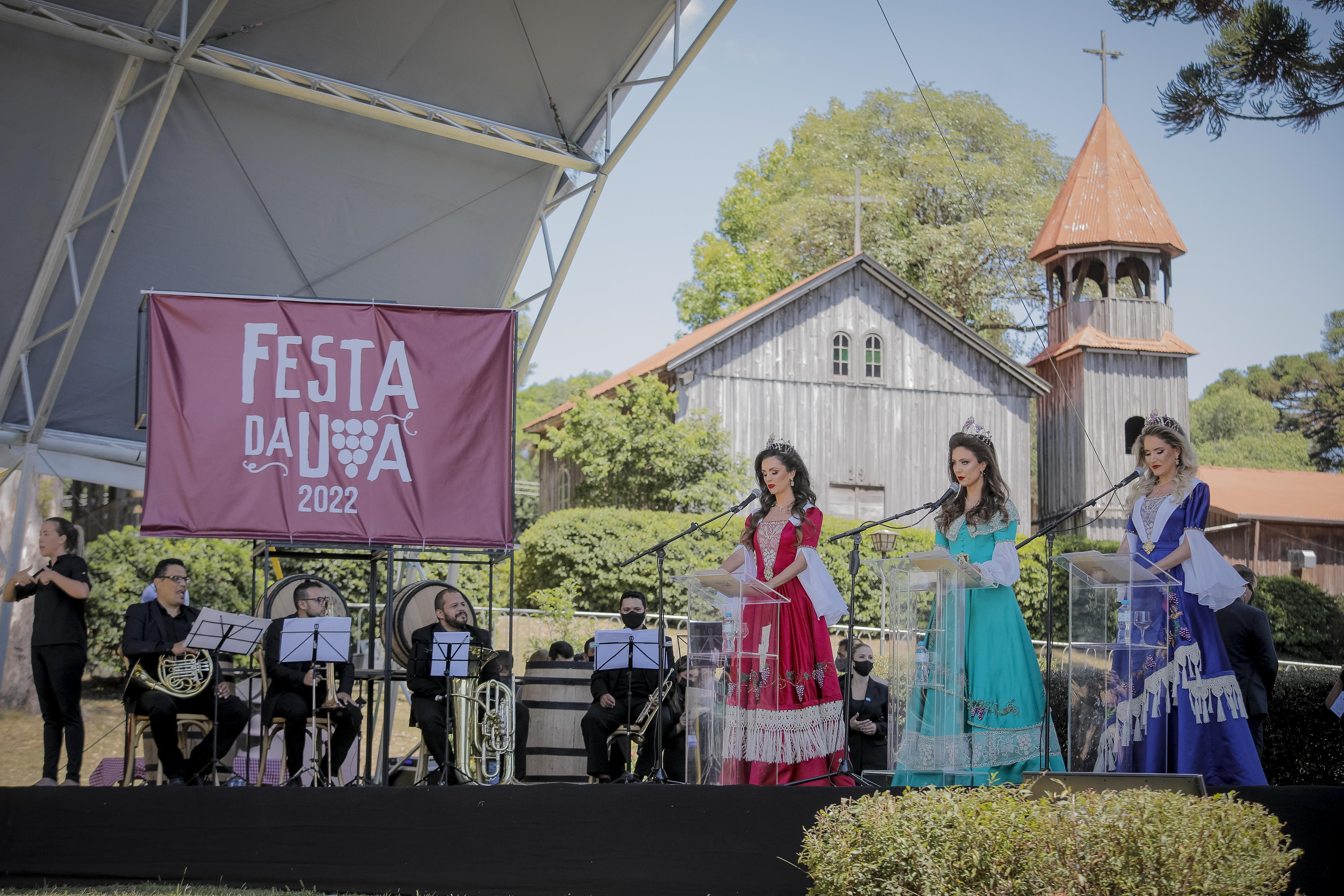
Grape Festival in Caxias do Sul

The state of Rio Grande do Sul is renowned as one of the most culturally rich states of Brazil. Rio Grande's music is a blend of many styles (most a continuum of rhythms found in neighboring countries), including the Chamamé, Milonga, Polca and Chacarera. Modern gaucho music or tchê music has been popular since the late 1980s. The inhabitants of the state are known in the country for drinking chimarrão, a local version of the mate drunk in neighbouring Uruguay and Argentina, and for consuming churrasco very regularly (a practice common due to the abundant sources of high quality meat), even going so far as considering this one of the most important elements of everyday life. Porto Alegre is home to Sport Club Internacional and Grêmio Foot-Ball Porto Alegrense. They are arch-rivals, one of the biggest rivalries in Brazil.

Each region of the state has its own cultural background. In the pampas (Southwest), the culture is still largely influenced by the old Gaúchos. Gaúcho is a term that can describe anyone born in the state of Rio Grande do Sul. However, it is also used to describe the 19th century rural workers of the region.

Other parts of the state have a slightly different culture, influenced mainly by German or Italian immigrants. After some generations, the descendants of immigrants were integrated in the local society, even though their cultural influences are still strong, mostly in the countryside. Despite these differences, the Gaucho people maintain a particular zeal for their culture and its variations.

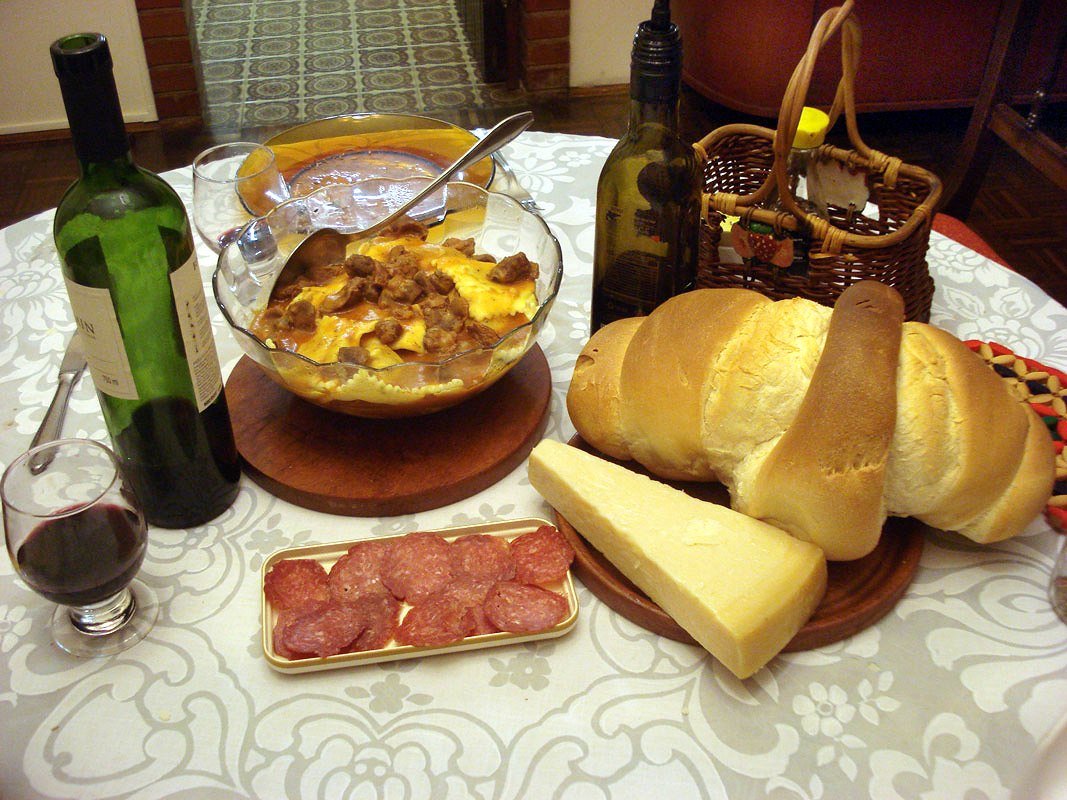
A typical meal in Rio Grande do Sul with wine, bread, cheese, and pasta with beef and salami

Although the Gaucho culture and its Portuguese-based language prevails in Rio Grande do Sul, the southernmost state of Brazil, sharing many of its folklore characteristics with neighboring horseback livestock raising, grassland centered cultures, such as found in Uruguay and in Argentina, the state also has other strong albeit less prominent cultural focus areas.

These are, notably the German-Brazilian cultural identity and the Riograndenser Hunsrückisch language (the estimated number of speakers are around 1,500,000), spoken in the state since 1824; it received official recognition by the state House of Representatives in 2012 by unanimous vote. Also, as the result of European immigration stated in the 19th century, the state has an Italian culture and language of its own, the Talian language (a Veneto-based language/dialect), spoken mostly in the highlands region, at the so-called Old Italian Colonies in the upper state (see Italian-Brazilian).

However, there are many other much smaller cultural minorities in the state (for example, the Afro-Brazilian community, the Guarani and Kaingang indigenous peoples, also Pomeranian, Polish, German-Jewish, etc.), However, these three are the predominant cultural expressions found in the state, each with living linguistic expressions which attest to their existence.

== Tourism and recreation ==
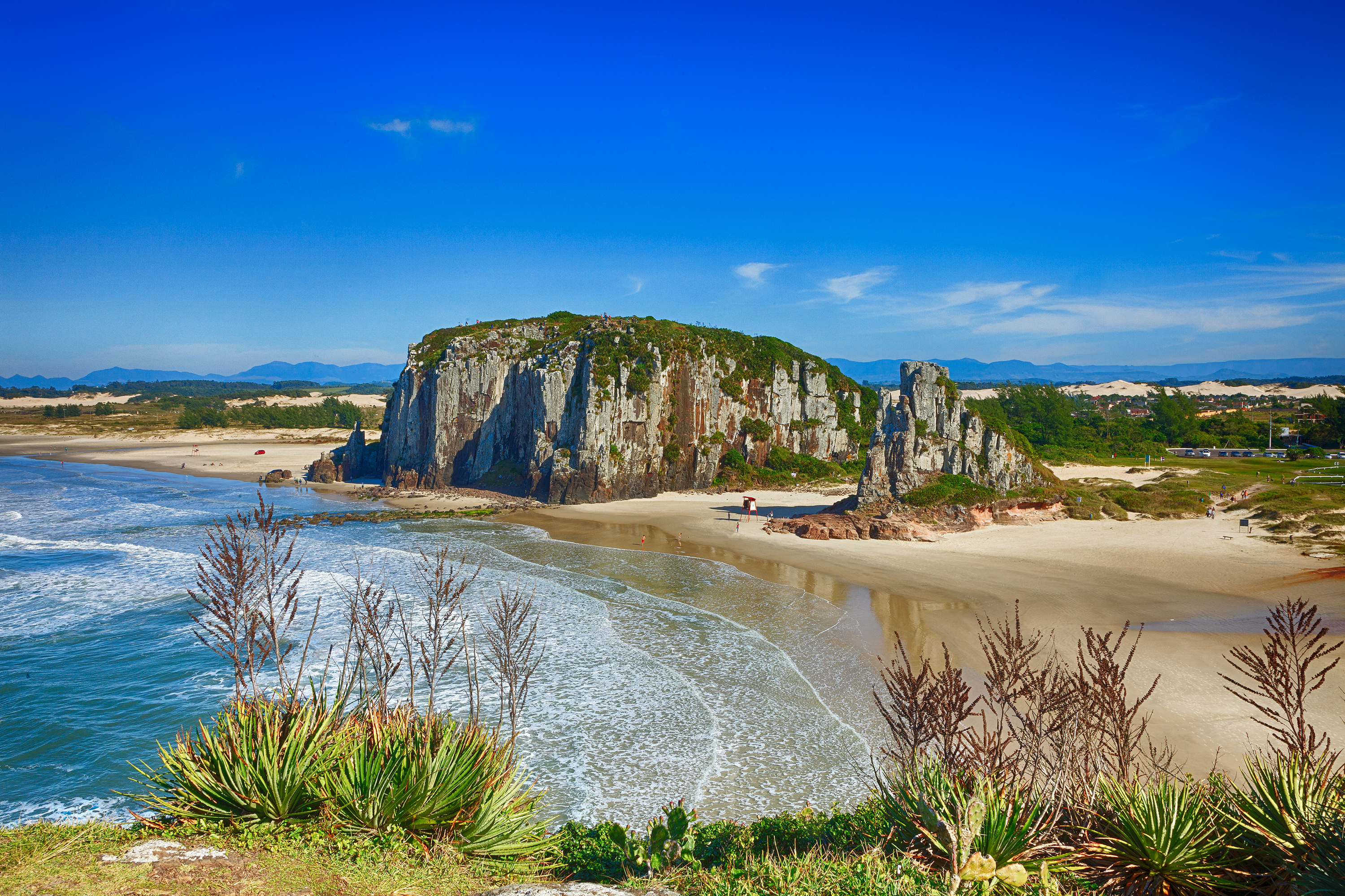
Guarita Beach in Torres

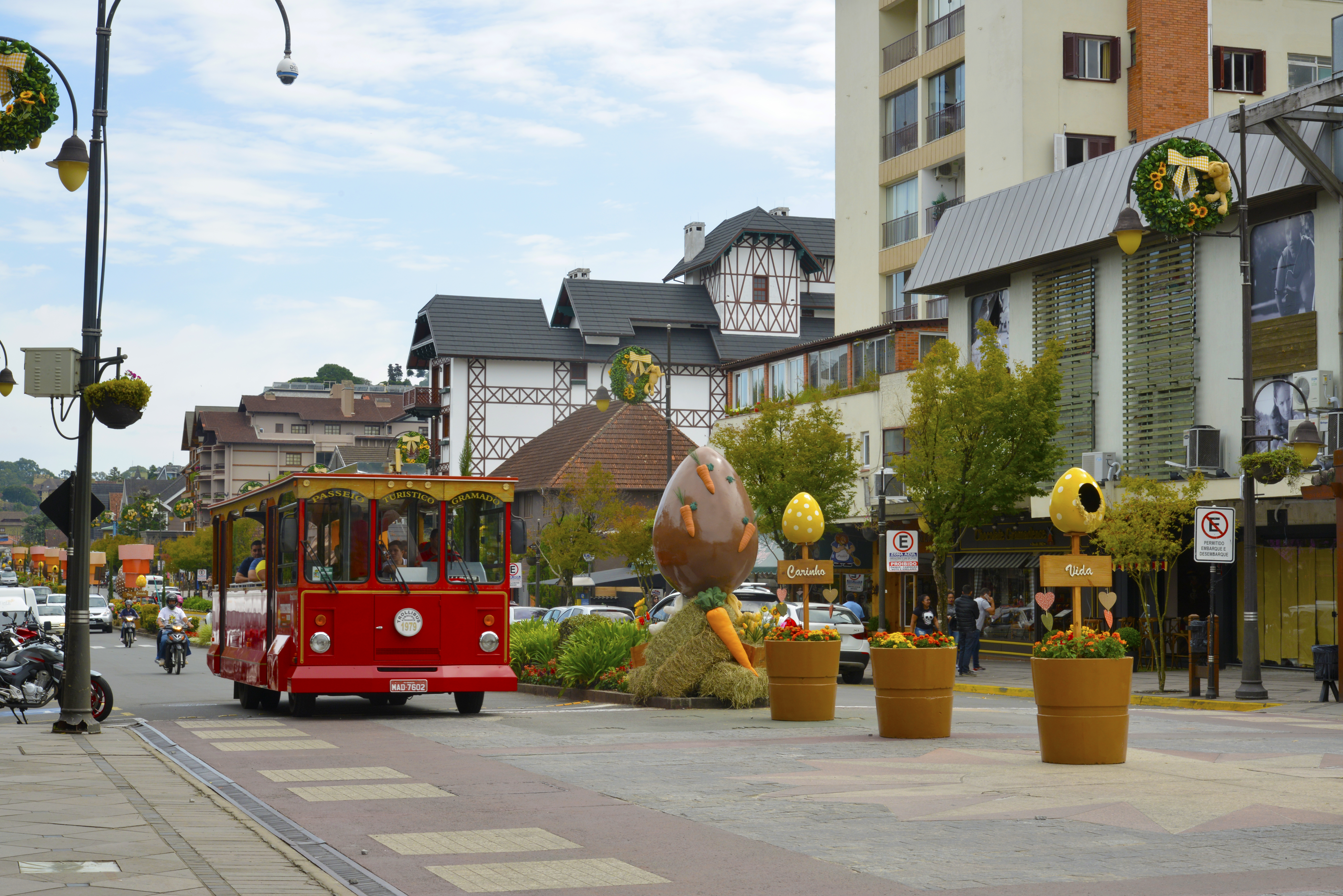
Gramado

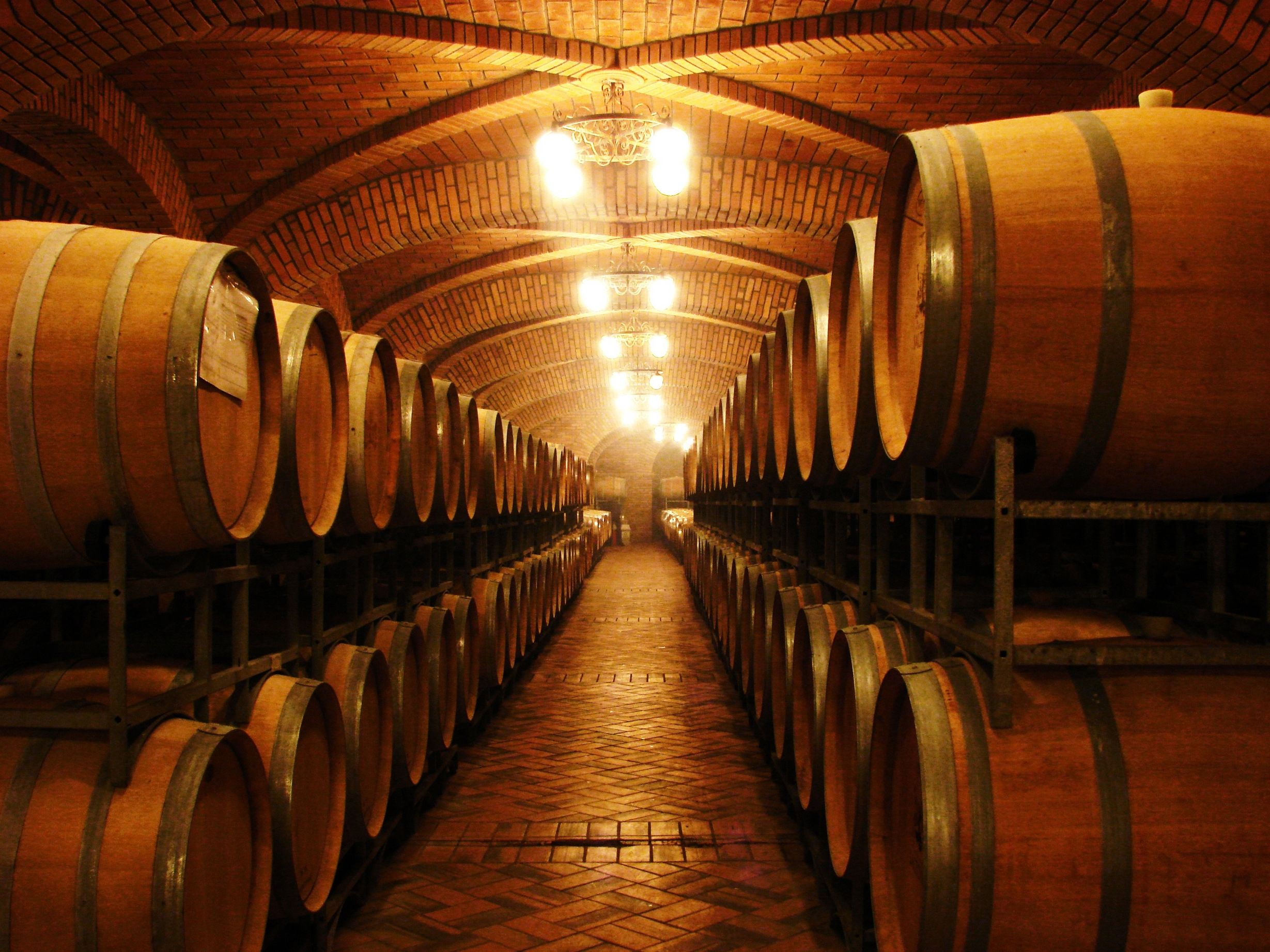
Enotourism is very popular in the region of Bento Gonçalves.

High-end tourism is very popular in the Germanesque cities of Gramado and Canela; their cold weather is among their attractions for internal tourism. Tourism is also high in the wine regions of the state, principally Caxias do Sul and Bento Gonçalves. The pampas of the native Brazilian Gaúcho are both a national and international curiosity to tourists and their customs are alive in the capital city of Porto Alegre as well as in the cities of the "interior" or western Rio Grande do Sul such as Santa Maria and Passo Fundo. The state is also home to the historic São Miguel das Missões, the ruins of an 18th-century Jesuit Mission. The state of Rio Grande do Sul and its cities have developed a series scenic routes to appeal to tourists. The Rota Romântica is a popular scenic drive that exhibits the diverse Germanic culture of the mountainous regions of the state referred to as the Serra Gaúcha. One can visit the state's Italian settlements through Caminhos da Colônia, tour the wine country through the Wine and Grapes Route and visit a subsection of the Rota Romântica called the Região das Hortênsias, the region filled with blue hydrangea flowers each spring.

In the far western area of the state are the remnants of Brazil's 17th century Jesuit missions or reductions (aldeias) to the Guaraní Indians.

Of all the ruins left behind by the vanished Guarani Missions, the most significant one is São Miguel or São Miguel Arcanjo, located nearby the present city of Santo Ângelo. There is an ongoing Light and Sound (or Som e Luz in Portuguese) show presented at the ruins of the São Miguel church.

== Language ==
As in all Brazil, Portuguese is the main spoken language. A few expressions of Spanish origin are common (such as "gracias" instead of "obrigado", or the vocative "tchê") etc., due to the proximity with Argentina and Uruguay and their common Gaucho past. Also a few words of German origin, particularly referring to cuisine, have entered the vocabulary, such as "chimia" (from "schmier") and "cuca" (from "Kuchen"). Words of Guarani language origin also make up the vocabulary, an example being the largely used word "guri", meaning "boy".

The Gaúchos use the pronoun "tu", instead of "você", the latter being the formal second person singular noun and the first being the informal noun equivalent. In the traditional Gaúcho dialect of the Pampas, the verb is conjugated correctly in the second person singular, as in European Portuguese (tu cantas, tu bates, tu partes, tu pões). In the colloquial Portuguese of Porto Alegre, however, the verb is conjugated in the second person as in the third person (tu canta, tu bate, tu parte, tu põe).

=== Gaúcho Portuguese phonology ===
==== Phonemes of Porto-alegrense Portuguese ====
	Labial	Alveolar	Postalveolar/ Palatal	Labiovelar	Velar/ Uvular/ Glottal
Nasal	m	n	ȷ̃	(w̃)	(ŋ) (ɰ̃)
Stop	p b	t d		kʷ ɡʷ	k ɡ
Fricative	f v	s z	ʃ ʒ		χ~ʁ~h~ɦ
Affricate			tʃ dʒ		
Lateral		l	lʲ		
Approximant/ Flap		ɾ	j	w	

Although this process is very common in the Southeast, in Gaúcho Portuguese the letters "s" and "z" are never pronounced as palato-alveolar consonants in coda position (e.g., pasto "pasture" is [ˈpaʃtu] in Rio de Janeiro, but [ˈpastu] in Porto Alegre).

In Rio Grande do Sul, as in most of Brazil, the letters "t" and "d" are pronounced as palato-alveolar affricate consonants, when immediately succeeded by the vowel "i" (a process of palatalization which, however, does not happen in the varieties of the Pampas). Moreover, the unstressed "e" and "o" are often reduced into [ɪ] and [ʊ], respectively. Therefore, in Porto Alegre, the unstressed "te" syllables are pronounced [tʃi], for example, while in the Pampas they are usually pronounced [tɪ]:

Porto Alegre: antigamente – [ɐ̃(n)ˌtʃiɡaˈmeȷ̃tʃʲ] or [ɐ̃(n)ˌtʃiɡaˈmentʃʲ]

Gaúcho Pampas: antigamente – [ɐ̃ˌtʃiɡaˈme̞nte̞]

(compare Spanish: antiguamente – [ãn̪t̪iɣ̞waˈmẽ̞n̪t̪e̞])

The dialect of the Pampas had experienced a stronger influence of Spanish language, while the dialect of Porto Alegre suffers modern influences of the Southeastern varieties.

Also, the vowel nasalization in Porto-alegrense Portuguese is far different from that seen in French, for example. In French, the nasalization extends uniformly through the entire vowel. In Porto Alegre, the nasalization begins almost imperceptibly, and then gets far stronger in the end of the vowel, therefore being closer to the nasalization of Hindi-Urdu phonology (see Anusvara). In some cases, the nasal archiphoneme actually represents the addition of a nasal consonant, like [m, n, ŋ, ȷ̃, w̃, ɰ̃].

manta = [ˈmɐ̃ntɐ]

tampa = [ˈtɐ̃mpɐ]

banco = [ˈbɐ̃ŋku]

bem = [bẽȷ̃]

bom = [bõʊ̯̃] or [ˈbõɰ̃] or [ˈbõŋ]

pan = [ˈpɐ̃ɰ̃] or [ˈpɐ̃ŋ]

It is also noteworthy that, in everyday speech, many unstressed vowels are not fully pronounced as they are supposed to be. For example:

toque = [ˈtɔkʲ]

mente = [ˈmẽȷ̃tʃ]

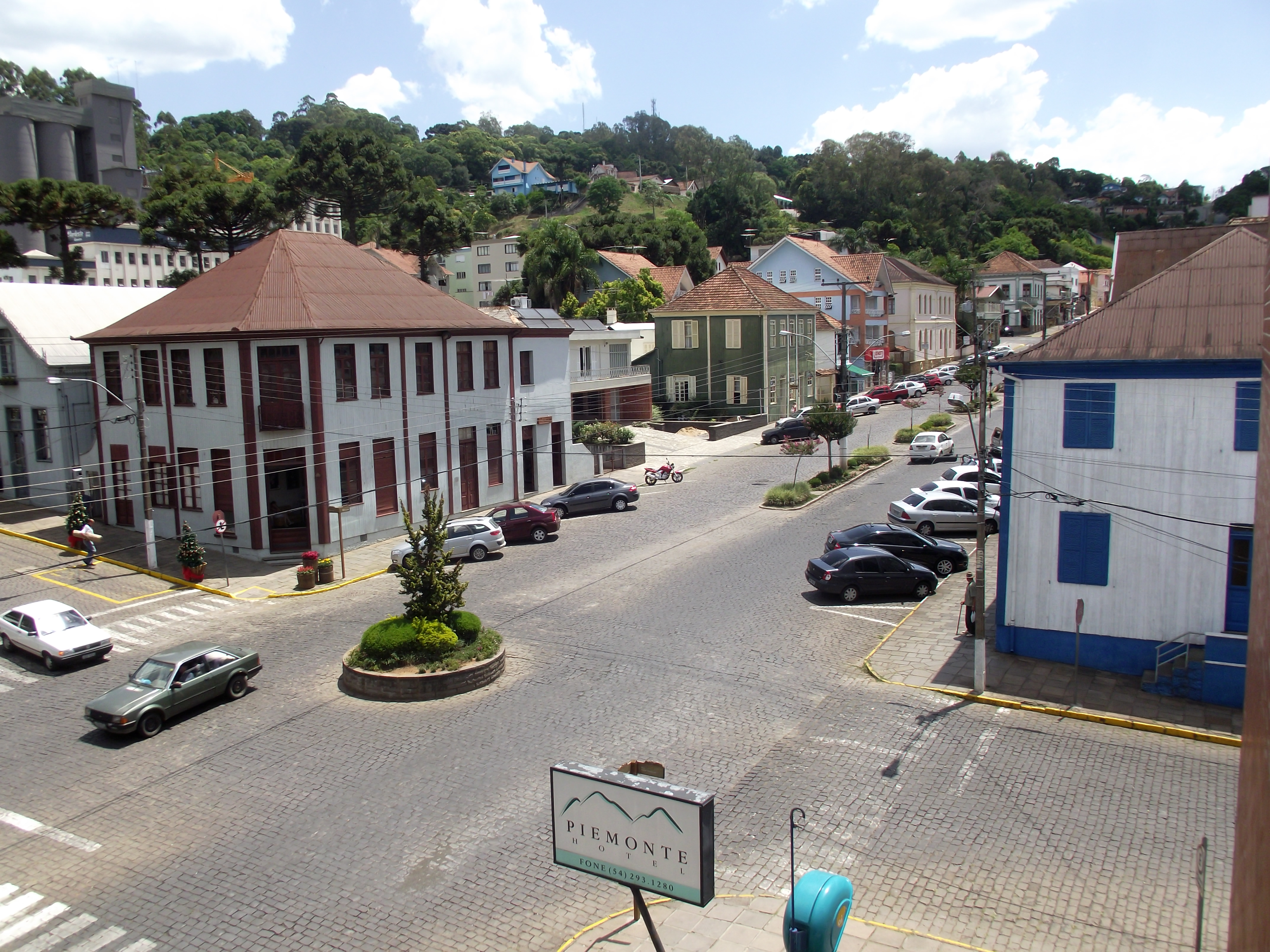
The town of Antônio Prado, where the Talian dialect is most commonly spoken among the inhabitants

pouco = [ˈpokʊ̥]

Essentially, the vowels [e] and [i] are both reduced and devoiced (or completely deleted) in word-final position, and sometimes also when unstressed and between consonants, always palatalizing the previous consonant. The vowels [o] and [u] are also reduced and devoiced to [ʊ̥], analogously to what happens in Japanese (see Japanese phonology#Devoicing). More rarely, [a] may become [ɐ̥] as well.

==== Example ====
Municipalities that the Talian is co-official in Rio Grande do Sul, highlighted in red: Bento Gonçalves, Caxias do Sul, Flores da Cunha, Nova Roma do Sul and Serafina Corrêa.

"Dom Sebastião I era o décimo-sexto Rei de Portugal, e sétimo da Dinastia de Avis. Era neto do rei João III, tornou-se herdeiro do trono depois da morte do seu pai, o príncipe João de Portugal, duas semanas antes do seu nascimento, e rei com apenas três anos, em 1557. Em virtude de ser um herdeiro tão esperado para dar continuidade à Dinastia de Avis, ficou conhecido como O Desejado; alternativamente, é também memorado como O Encoberto ou O Adormecido, devido à lenda que se refere ao seu regresso numa manhã de nevoeiro, para salvar a Nação."

[ˈdõʊ̯̃ sebasʃiˈɐ̃ʊ̯̃ pɾiˈmeɪ̯ɾʊ ˈɛɾɐʊ̯ ˈdɛsimʊ ˈsestʊ ˈhej dʒi poɾtuˈɡaw | i ˈsɛtʃimʊ da dʒinasˈʃia dʒi ˈavis ‖ ɛɾɐ ˈnɛtʊ dʊ ˈheɪ̯ ʒʊˈɐ̃ʊ̯̃ teɾˈseɪ̯ɾʊ ‖ toɾˈnoʊ̯ sjeɾˈdeɪ̯ɾʊ dʊ ˈtɾonʊ deˈpojz da ˈmɔɾtʃi dʊ sew ˈpaɪ̯ | ʊ ˈpɾinsipi ʒʊˈɐ̃ʊ̯̃ dʒi poɾtuˈɡaʊ̯ | ˈdu.as seˈmɐ̃nɐs ˈɐ̃tʃis dʊ sew nasiˈmentʊ | i ˈhej kũw̃ aˈpenɐs ˈtɾez ˈɐ̃nʊs | ẽȷ̃ ˈmiw kiˈȷ̃entʊz i siŋˈkwentɐɪ̯ ˈsɛtʃi ‖ ẽȷ̃ viɾˈtudʒi dʒi ˈseɾ ũw̃ eɾˈdeɪ̯ɾʊ tɐ̃ʊ̯̃ ɪspeˈɾadʊ paɾɐ ˈdaɾ kontʃinwiˈdadʒ a dʒinasˈʃia dʒi ˈavis | fiˈkoʊ̯ kõȷ̃eˈsidʊ ˈkomʊ | ʊ dezeˈʒadʊ ‖ aʊ̯ˈteɾnaˈtʃivaˈmẽȷ̃tʃ | ˈɛ tɐ̃mˈbẽȷ̃ memoˈɾadʊ ˈkomʊ | ʊ ẽȷ̃koˈbɛɾtʊ | ˈoʊ̯ | ʊ aˈdoɾmeˈsidʊ ‖ deˈvidwa ˈlenda ki si heˈfɛɾjaʊ̯ ˈseʊ̯ heˈɡɾɛsʊ ˈnũma mɐ̃ˈȷ̃ɐ̃ dʒi ˈnevʊˈejɾʊ ˈpaɾa saʊ̯ˈvaɾ a naˈsɐ̃ʊ̯̃ ‖]

OBS: The pronunciation may be subject to free variation.

Native Portuguese speaker from Porto Alegre, Rio Grande do Sul reading the above paragraph.

=== Minority languages ===
Minority languages spoken in Rio Grande do Sul include Indigenous languages (Guarani, Kaingang, etc.), and European derived languages (Talian, Riograndenser Hunsrückisch, East Pomeranian dialect of Low German, Yiddish and Polish).

Most of the German dialects speakers in southern Brazil spoke or eventually adopted Hunsrückisch so that it became the most commonly used German dialect in this part of the world and is still spoken by many people today (also referred to as Riograndenser Hunsrückisch to differentiate it from the Hunsrückisch spoken in Germany).

In its 180 years of history Riograndenser Hunsrückisch has been influenced by Portuguese and by other German dialects, such as Pfälzisch.

Talian is a Brazilian variety of the Venetian language, also often called Vêneto for that reason.

All minority languages in southern Brazil have experienced a significant degree of decline in the last few decades.

== Sport ==
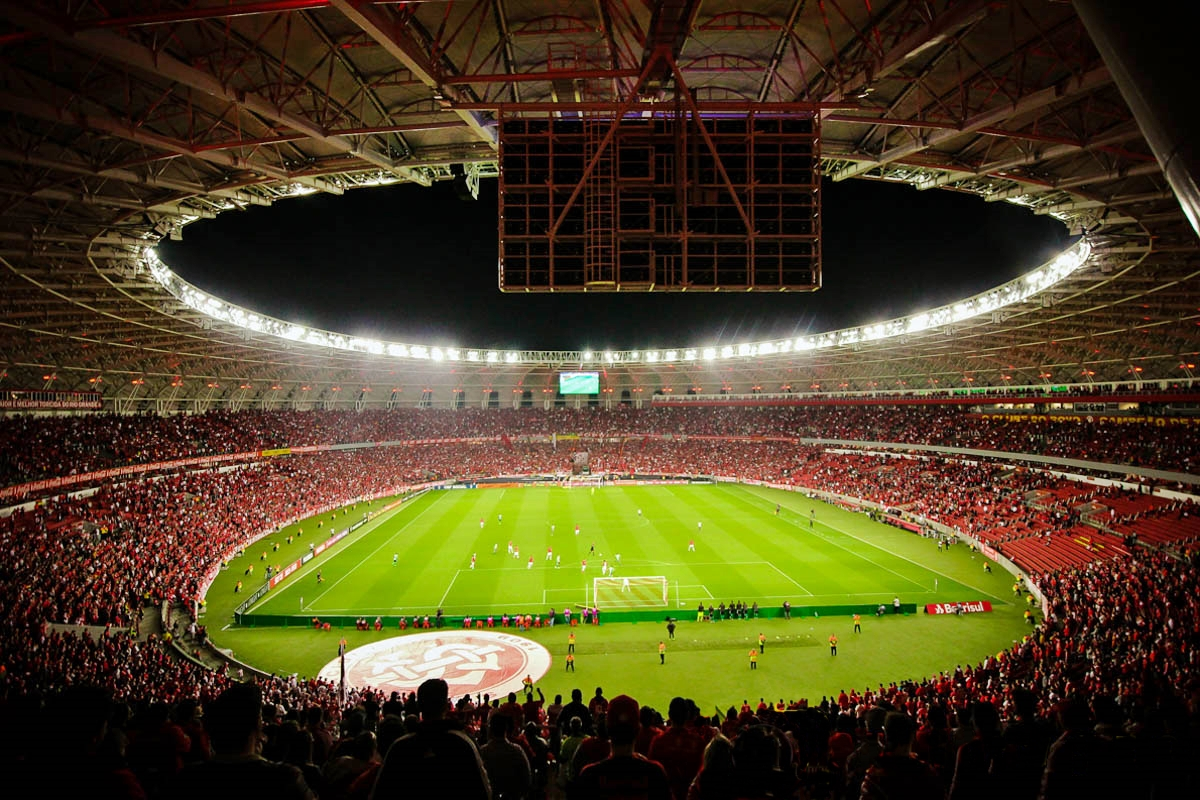
Estádio Beira-Rio was one of the venues for the 2014 FIFA World Cup.

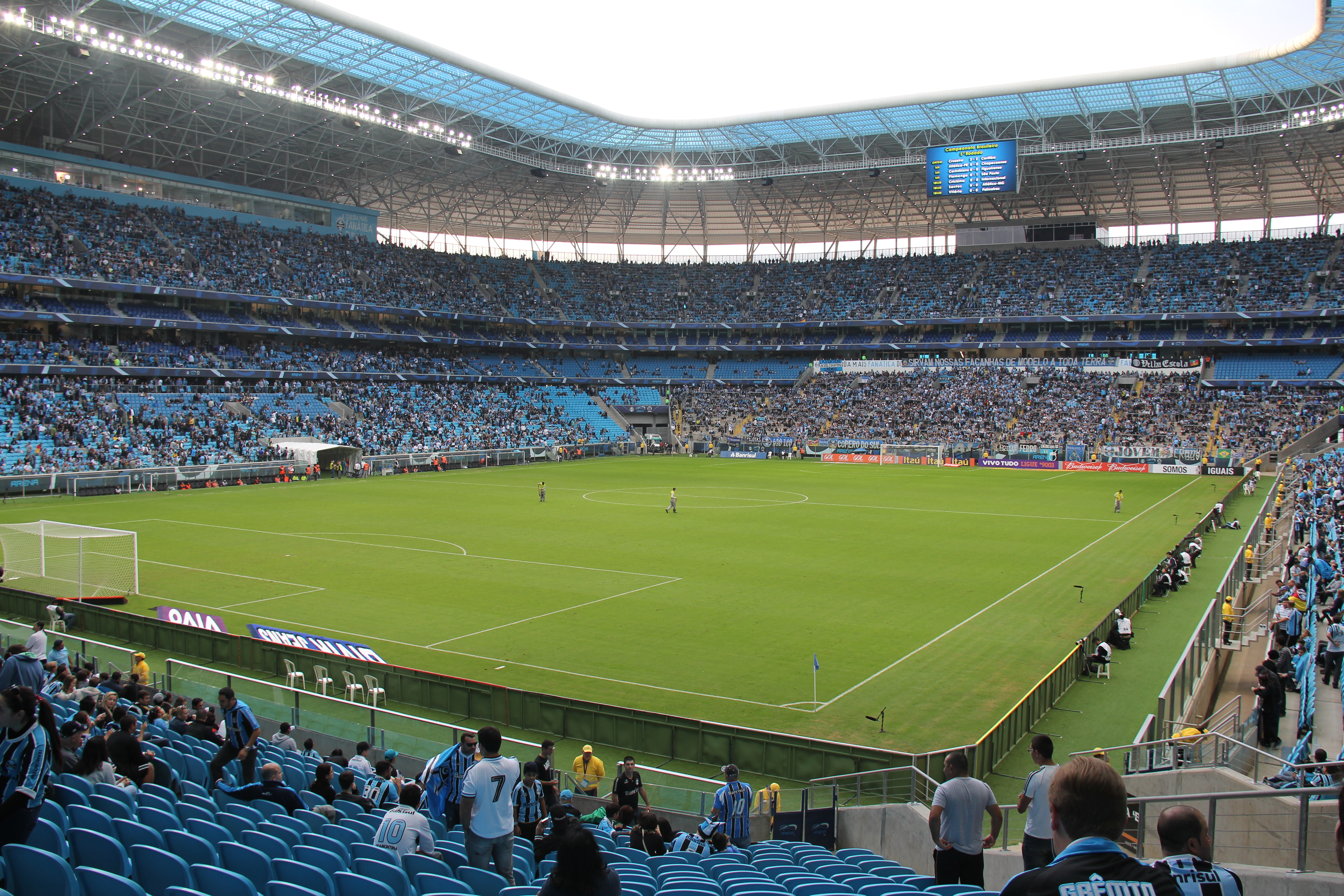
Arena do Grêmio

Rio Grande do Sul currently has eight football teams belonging to the divisions of the Brazilian Football Championship: Internacional, Grêmio, Juventude, Caxias, Brasil de Pelotas, Aimoré, Novo Hamburgo São José and Ypiranga. Sport Club Rio Grande, from the municipality of Rio Grande, is the oldest in Brazil and currently plays in the Campeonato Gaúcho of the Second Division.

Rio Grande do Sul is also a national and world reference in futsal, with teams such as Inter/Ulbra in Porto Alegre, ACBF in Carlos Barbosa, Atlântico in Erechim, Ulbra in Canoas, Assoeva in Venâncio Aires and Enxuta in Caxias do Sul. The municipality of Carlos Barbosa is considered the futsal capital in Brazil.

Olympic medalists who were born in the state include: Mayra Aguiar and Daniel Cargnin (judo); Fernando Scheffer (swimming); André Johannpeter (equestrian); André Heller, Gustavo Endres, Murilo Endres, Renan Dal Zotto, Paulão, Fernanda Garay, Carol Albuquerque, Éder, Janelson, Jorge Édson, Lucão, Marcus Vinícius and Thiago Alves (volleyball). Also from the state is Thomaz Koch, considered one of the greatest tennis players in the history of Brazil and Henrique Mecking, considered the greatest Brazilian chess player of all time, who came to be the 3rd best in the world; in addition to World Championships medalists such as Babi and Deonise in handball, João Derly and Maria Portela in judo, Daiane dos Santos in gymnastics and Samuel de Bona in the aquatic marathon.

== See also ==
- List of Rio Grande do Sul state symbols
- List of municipalities in Rio Grande do Sul
