= Indigenous peoples in Uruguay =

Uruguayos nativos (Spanish)

Total population
- 218,259 (2023 census); 6.4% of the population 2.4% as main ancestry

Regions with significant populations
- Uruguay

Languages
- Spanish

Religion
- Catholicism

Related ethnic groups
- Indigenous peoples in Argentina, Indigenous peoples in Brazil

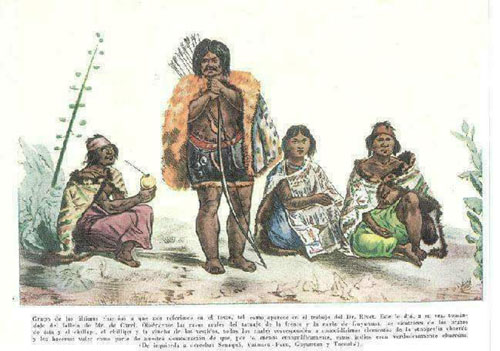
The last Charrúas.

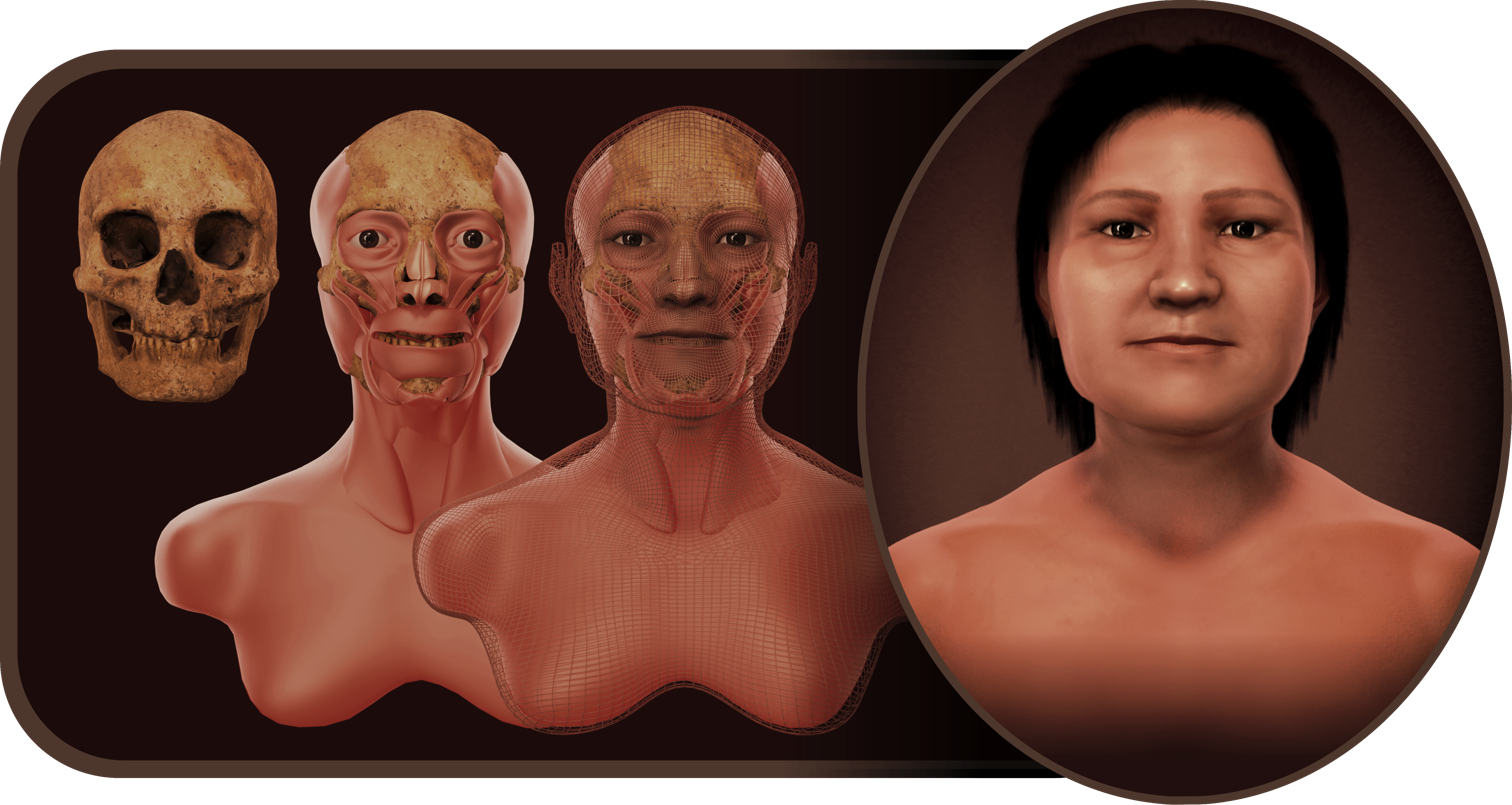
Facial reconstruction of the skull of an Indigenous woman who lived around 1600 years ago, found in Rocha Department, Uruguay.

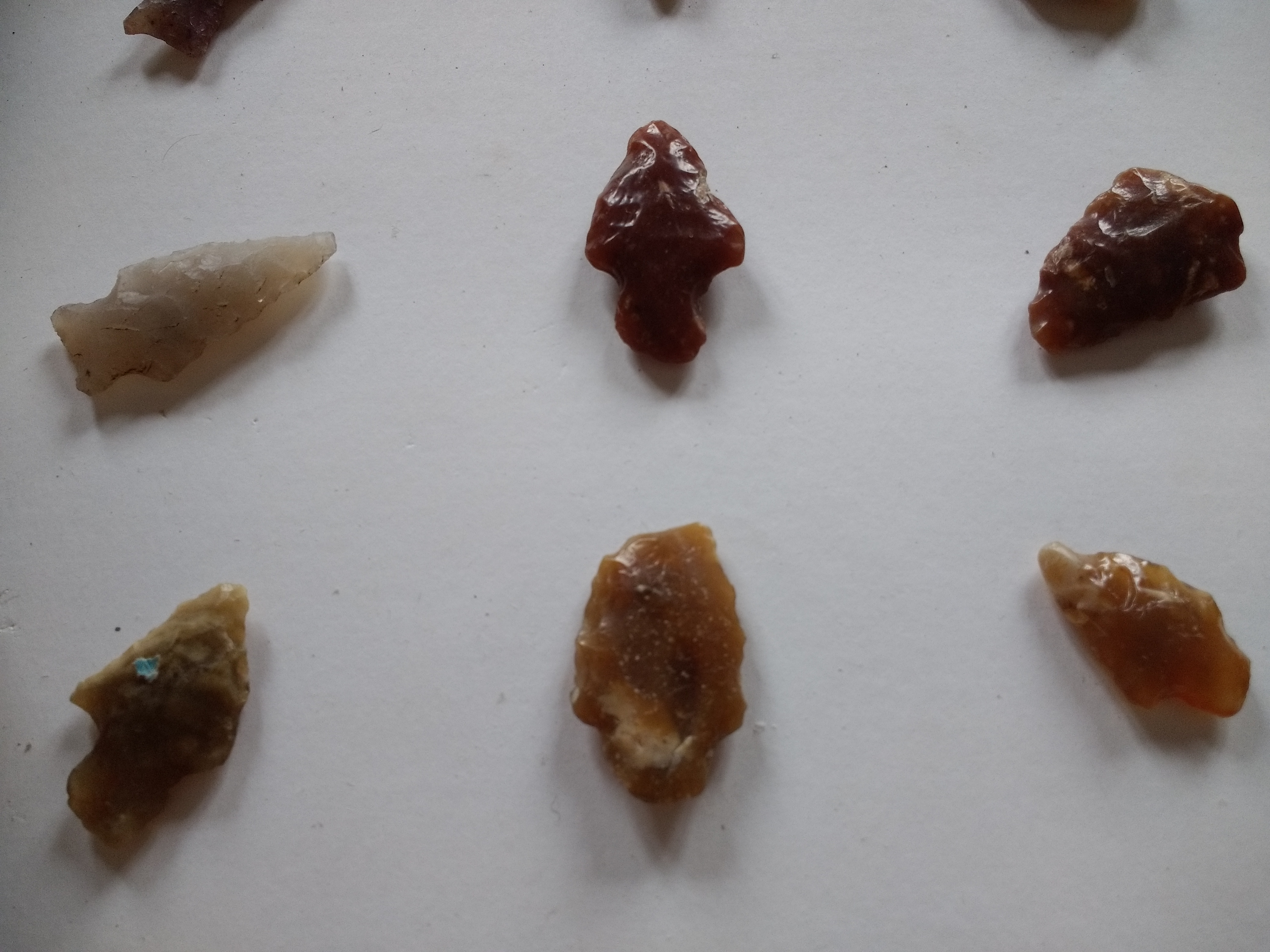
Arrowheads found in Colonia Department.

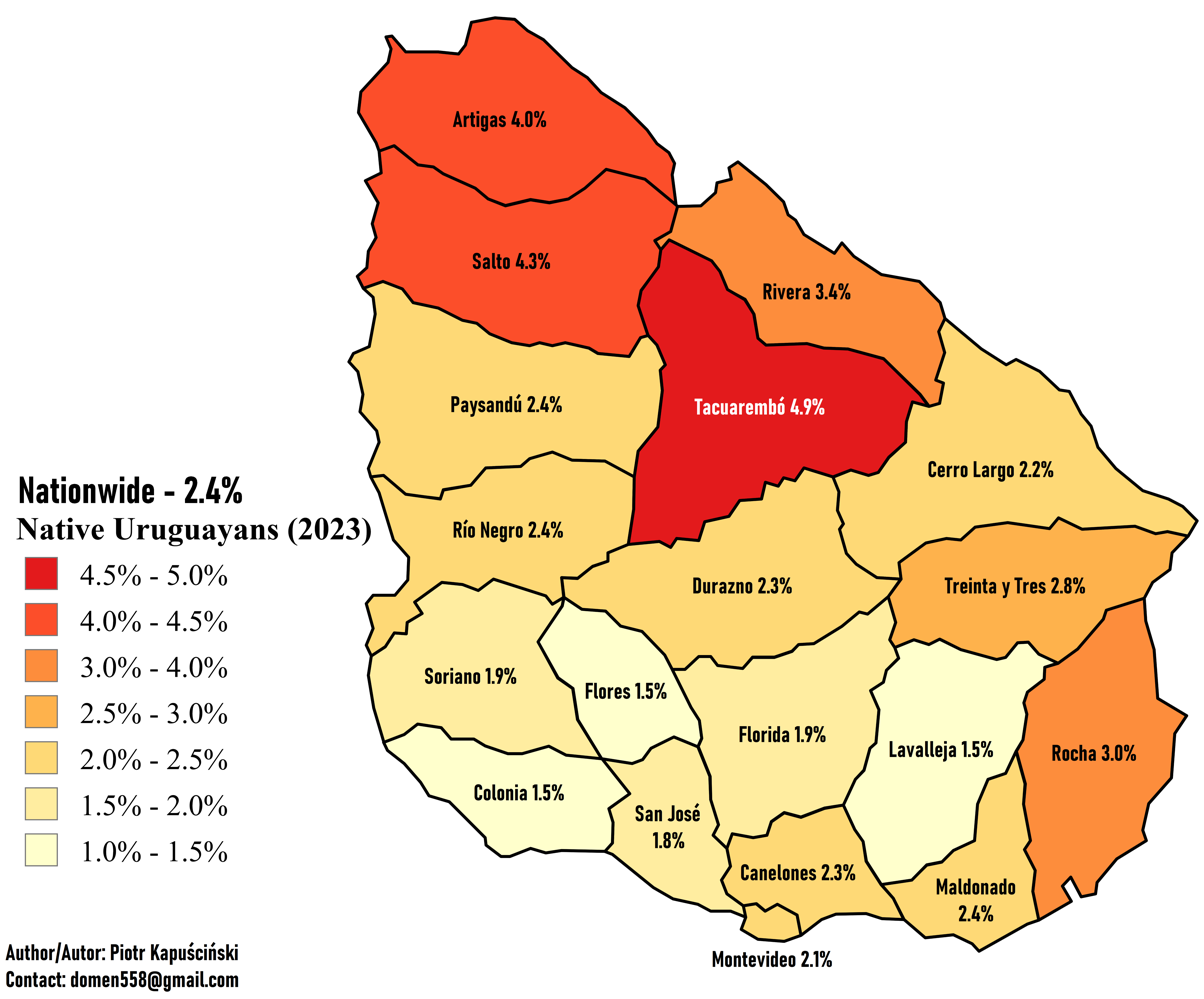
Distribution of Native Uruguayans by department according to the 2023 census

Indigenous peoples in Uruguay or Native Uruguayans, are the peoples who have historically lived in the modern state of Uruguay. Because of genocidal colonial practices, disease and active exclusion, only a very small share of the population is aware of the country's Indigenous history or has known Indigenous ancestry.

Scholars disagree about the first settlers in what is now Uruguay, but there is evidence of human presence from 10,000 BCE. Indigenous Uruguayans disappeared in the 1830s and, with the exception of the Guaraní, little is known about these peoples and even less about their genetic characteristics. The Charrúa peoples were perhaps the best-known Indigenous people of the Southern Cone in what was called the Banda Oriental. Other significant tribes were the Minuane, Yaro, Güenoa, Chaná, Bohán and Guaraní, and the Arachán. Languages once spoken in the area include Charrúa, Chaná, Güenoa, and Guaraní.

A 2005 genetic study showed 38% of Uruguayans had some Indigenous ancestry. In the 2023 Census, 6.4% of the population reported having some degree of indigenous ancestry and 2.4% of the population reported indigenous ancestry as their main ancestry. A 2004 DNA study in the American Journal of Human Biology suggested that the Native American contribution to Uruguay's genetic composition may be far higher than is commonly assumed.

== History ==
Thousands of years ago, a local culture developed in nowadays northern Uruguay, known as Hombre del Catalanense. Afterwards, in pre-colonial times, Uruguayan territory was inhabited by small tribes of nomadic Charrúa, Chana, Arachan and Guarani peoples. They were semi-nomadic people who survived by hunting, fishing and gathering and probably never numbered more than 10,000 – 20,000 people.

The genocide of the Charrúa culminated on April 11, 1831 with the Massacre of Salsipuedes, where most of the Charrúa men were killed by the Uruguayan army on the orders of President Fructuoso Rivera. The remaining 300 Charrúa women and children were divided as household slaves and servants among Europeans. By 1840 there were only 18 surviving Charrúa in Uruguay. According to the history professor and journalist Lincoln Maiztegui Casas, “the disappearance of the Charrúa people was a gradual process that took more than 200 years, and the root cause was territorial occupation by Europeans”.

== Significant peoples ==
=== Charrúa ===
The Charrúa are an Indigenous people or Indigenous Nation of the Southern Cone in present-day Uruguay and the adjacent areas in Argentina (Entre Ríos) and Brazil (Rio Grande do Sul). They were a semi-nomadic people who sustained themselves mainly through hunting and gathering. Since resources were not permanent in every region, they would constantly be on the move. Rain, drought, and other environmental factors determined their movement. For this reason they are often classified as seasonal nomads.

A large number of Charrúa people were massacred in a campaign in 1831 by the Uruguayan Army known as the Massacre of Salsipuedes. Though largely erased from modern histories, some communities of the Charrúa survived outside of Uruguay in Argentina and Brazil. It is believed that there are approximately between 160,000 and 300,000 individuals in Uruguay, Argentina, and Brazil today who are descendants of surviving Charrúa. Contemporary descendants of the Charrúa have created organizations and advocate for the memory of the Indigenous people.

=== Guarani ===
The Guaraní are a group of culturally-related indigenous peoples of South America. They are distinguished from the related Tupi by their use of the Guarani language. The traditional range of the Guarani people is in what is now Paraguay between the Paraná River and lower Paraguay River, the Misiones Province of Argentina, southern Brazil once as far east as Rio de Janeiro, and parts of Uruguay and Bolivia.

The Guarani number around 280,000 and are primarily concentrated in Argentina, Bolivia, Brazil and Paraguay. Their demographic dominance of the region has been reduced by European colonisation and the commensurate rise of mestizos.

Most notably, the Guarani language, still widely spoken across traditional Guarani homelands, is one of the two official languages in Paraguay, the other one being Spanish. The Paraguayan population learns Guarani both informally from social interaction and formally in public schools. In modern Spanish, Guaraní also refers to any Paraguayan national in the same way that the French are sometimes called Gauls.

=== Guenoa ===
The Guenoa or Güenoa were one of the Native nations of Entre Rios, Argentina, Uruguay and some parts of Brazil. They were related to the other tribes in the area like Charrua, Minuane, Yaro and Bohán. They are considered synonymous with the Minuan.

== See also ==
- Localidad Rupestre de Chamangá
- Uruguayan people
- Indigenous peoples in South America
- Hombre del Catalanense
