= Massacre of Salsipuedes =

1831 mass killing of indigenous Charrúa by the Uruguayan Army

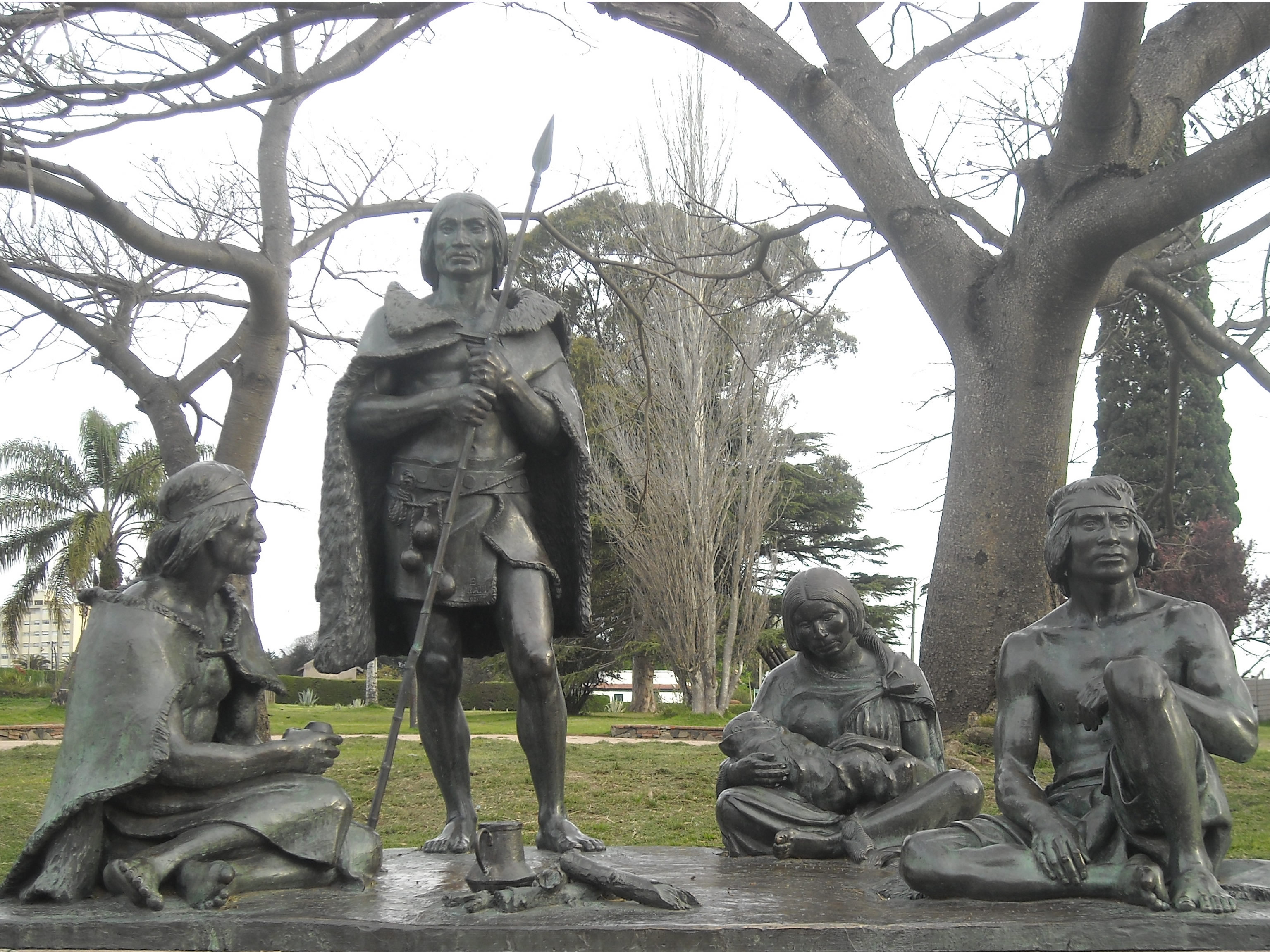
- "Los últimos charrúas" ("The Last Charrúas"), Monument in Montevideo to four survivors of the massacre that were sold to a human zoo in Paris.
- Location: Uruguay
- Date: April 11, 1831
- Target: Charrúa
- Attack type: Genocidal massacre, mass murder, ethnic cleansing
- Deaths: 41: 40 Charruas; 1 officer
- Injuries: 9 officers
- Victims: 300 charrúas, later taken as prisoners
- Perpetrator: Uruguayan Army led by Fructuoso Rivera

The Massacre of Salsipuedes (Spanish: Masacre de Salsipuedes), or the Slaughter of Salsipuedes (Spanish: Matanza de Salsipuedes), was a genocidal attack carried out on 11 April 1831 by the Uruguayan Army, led by president Fructuoso Rivera, as part of the State's efforts to eradicate the Charrúa indigenous people from the Uruguayan countryside.

The massacre took place on the riverbanks of the Great Salsipuedes Creek, whose name is a contraction of the Spanish phrase sal si puedes ("get-out-if-you-can"). According to the official report made by Rivera, 40 were killed and 300 were taken prisoner, with an uncertain number managing to escape; following the massacre, the survivors were forcibly marched to Montevideo and sold into slavery, and 4 were notably sent to a human zoo in Paris. While partial descendants of the Charrúa are today believed to number between 160,000 and 300,000 across Uruguay, Brazil and Argentina, the massacre became a major event in the decimation of their communities and began to erase them from Uruguayan public memory; for this reason, it is remembered as the event that exterminated the Charrúa as a people.

== Historical background ==
At the time of first contact with Europeans in the 16th century, the Charrúa were the predominant people in the lands between the Paraná and Uruguay rivers, with smaller Chaná and Guaraní populations in the area as well. Conflicts with Europeans spurred their migration to the Banda Oriental, which today contains the modern-day territory of Uruguay and southern Brazil. The Charrúa predominated particularly in the north of the region, living semi-nomadically in tune with rain, drought, and the availability of prey. The Banda Oriental saw relatively late European settlement due to a combination of fierce indigenous resistance and a lack of attractive natural resources; when settlers eventually did arrive by the turn of the 18th century, it was as part of the struggle between the British, Spanish and Portuguese empires for control of the Platine Basin. This resulted in the Charrúas' displacement from the part of the Banda Oriental that is now part of the Brazilian states of Rio Grande do Sul and Santa Catarina.

Following decades of fighting between the Charrúa and the Spanish colonists, a peace treaty was signed on 22 March 1732 where the Charrúa, in exchange for recognising Spanish laws, had their laws and sovereignty recognised by the Spanish in kind. The Cisplatine War saw indigenous people play a vital role in securing Uruguayan independence: the Thirty-Three Orientals enjoyed fervent support among the Charrúa, who saw them as bulwarks against the Brazilian Empire that had previously displaced them. Many indigenous people (including one of the survivors later sent to France) had also previously served under José Gervasio Artigas.

== Lead-up to the massacre ==
After independence, indigenous peoples' place in Uruguay were put into question. Artigas and Rivera looked positively upon the Guaraní and preferred to maintain peace with them, as they had become compatible with their view of an independent Uruguayan society: influenced by the Jesuit missions, they had adopted a sedentary way of life and were progressively assimilating into the Mestizo communities. The Charrúa, however, were not so amenable to assimilation. Already affected by famines due to cattle exploitation, decades of ferocious conflict with state and indigenous forces alike had harmed them further, with the Guaraní Andrés Guazurary (considered by Artigas as his indigenous political heir) clashing fiercely with the Charrúa during his military campaigns.

According to historian Lincoln Maiztegui Casas, "The disappearance of the Charrúa was a gradual process that took more than 200 years and was generated from the occupation of the territory by Europeans". Through a combination of land theft and colonization, their lack of amenability to assimilation, affliction by disease, and the disruption of their nomadic way of life, their fortunes were severely affected. with few holding on to the Charrúa way of life by the early 19th century. The remaining that did, however, continued to move freely throughout northern Uruguay as in pre-colonial times and came into increasingly frequent conflicts with encroaching white settlers, who accused them of murder, rape, robbery and banditry. Because of this, the authorities began to see them as an insurmountable "obstacle" to establishing what they saw as an organised society; as their way of life was an inherent disruption to their settler-colonial ambitions.

Preceding Fructuosa Rivera's assumption of the presidency, he was petitioned in February 1830 by his rival Juan Antonio Lavalleja: the Charrúa, whom Lavalleja described as "wicked people who know no restraint (...) (and could not) be left to their natural inclinations", should be confronted in order to satisfy the settlers' demands for protection. Rivera, who had maintained friendly relations with the Charrúa and still enjoyed widespread popularity for his role in the war for independence, agreed to spearhead the Campaña de Salsipuedes — The Salsipuedes campaign.

== Massacre ==
In early 1831, Rivera summoned the leading Charrúa chiefs — Venado, Polidoro, Rondeau and Juan Pedro — and their families to a meeting on a riverbank of what is today known as the Great Salsipuedes Creek. As a cover story, Rivera had told the chiefs that the army was in need of their help to protect the border region. When the Charrúa arrived by the hundreds on 11 April 1831, one of the army generals furthered the ruse by releasing his horses as a gesture of good faith, and the chiefs reciprocated by releasing most of their horses as well. As the meeting progressed, the Charrúa became increasingly drunk and off their guard; the details of the subsequent events are uncertain and subject to dispute. According to Eduardo Acevedo Díaz, the signal to trigger the attack came when Rivera asked for Chief Venado's knife in order to chop tobacco, whereupon Venado was shot dead. In any case, the Charrúa were suddenly surrounded by 1200 soldiers under the command of Bernabé Rivera, President Rivera's nephew.

According to official historiography, 40 people were killed and 300 were taken prisoner, with a number of Charrúa managing to escape; among the soldiers, 9 were wounded and 1 was killed.

== Aftermath ==
The survivors were forcibly marched 260 km to Montevideo, where they were sold into slavery. The massacre was followed by two other attacks by the Queguay Grande River and the "La cueva del Tigre" passage respectively, in order to track down and eliminate the Charrúa that had either escaped or not been present. On 17 August, Bernabé Rivera's army ambushed a group of Charrúa in Mataojo led by the chiefs El Adivino and Juan Pedro, of which 15 were killed and 80 were taken prisoner; 18 Charrúa, including the chief Polidoro, managed to escape. On 17 June of the following year, a failed ambush at the Yacaré Cururú Creek resulted in Bernabé Rivera, along with 2 officers and 9 soldiers, being killed by a group of Charrúa that had survived the previous attacks.

Hearing of the Charrúan prisoners being put up for sale, the director of the Oriental School of Montevideo thought that the story of a nearly extinct people would spark the interest of French scientists and the public. Thusly, French ex-general François Curel agreed to purchase four Charrúa to be exhibited in Paris: medicine man Senacua Sénaqué, warrior Vaimaca-Pirú Sira (who had previously served under Artigas), and the young couple Laureano Tacuavé Martínez and María Micaela Guyunusa; Guyunusa was pregnant at the time.

The four Charrúa disembarked with Curel on 25 February 1833, arriving in Saint-Malo on 7 May of that year before being transported to Paris, where they were exhibited as part of a human zoo. On 20 September, Guyunusa gave birth to a girl biologically fathered by Sira: initially given the name María Mónica Micaëla Igualdad Libertad, her French birth certificate lists her name as Caroliné Tacouavé. Sénaqué, Sira and Guyunusa all died within the first year of their arrival, with Guyunusa's widower Tacuavé adopting the infant girl as his own. She died the following year, surmised by historian Darío Arce Asenjo to be from the same disease that took Guyunusa. The ultimate fate of Tacauvé, the last survivor of the group, is unknown; his later activities are scantly documented and no record of his death has been found, but Asenjo theorised from the few existing records that he integrated into the French lifestyle, adopting the Francophone spelling of his name and working as a medicine salesman and maker of card decks for some time before dying of sickness or old age; it is unknown if he left any descendants. The sculpture Los Últimos Charrúas ("The Final Charrúans") was erected in their memory in Montevideo, Uruguay.

== Legacy ==
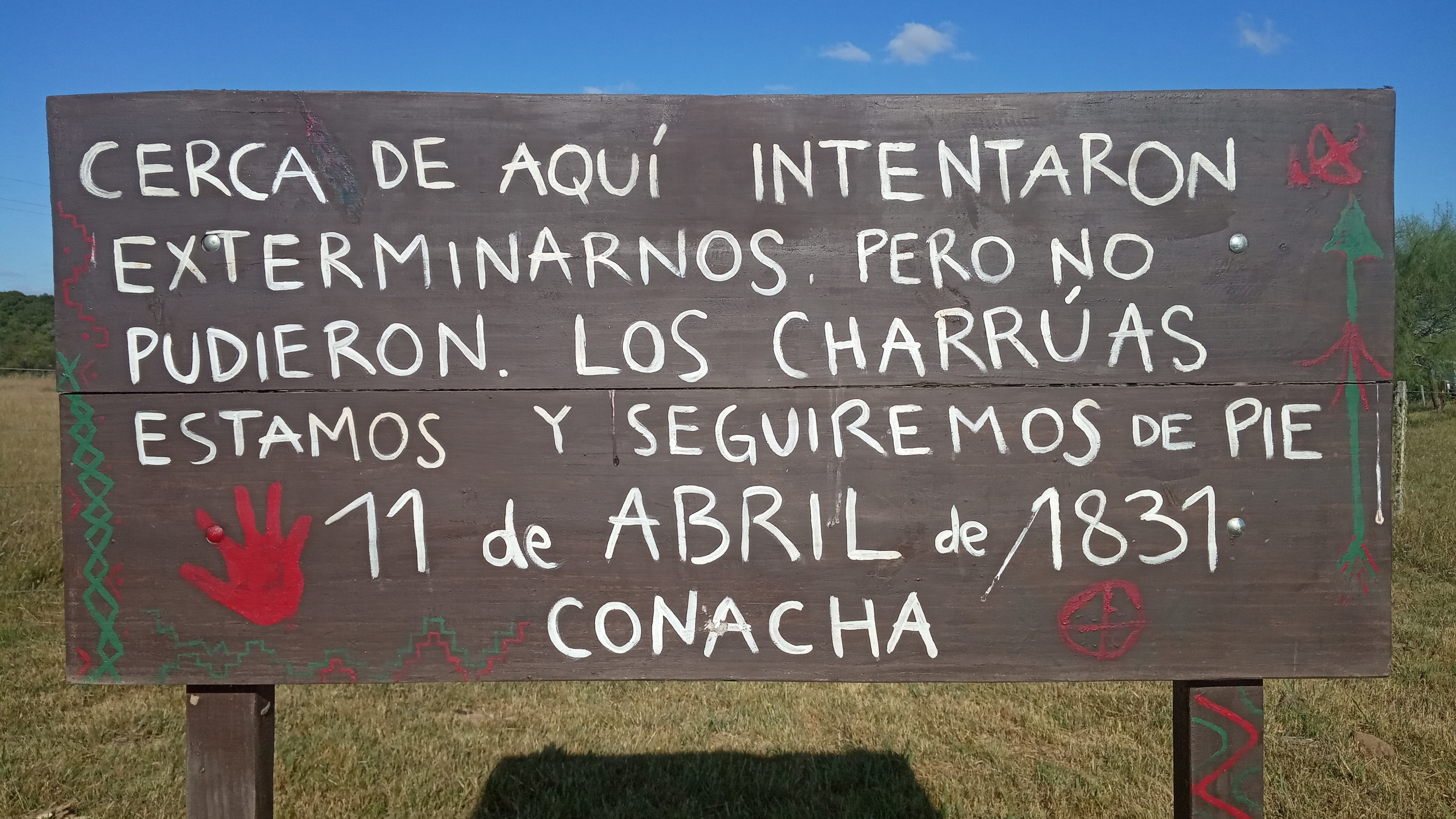
Plaque near the village of Tiatucura.

Regardless of the survivors' ultimate fates, it has been argued by historian Diego Bracco that the massacre represented the death blow to the indigenous nations of Uruguay at the time; to him, the massacre marked the disappearance of the Charrúa from public memory and their end as a cohesive community with an identity, territory and common historical memory. The Charrúa language is today considered extinct; although the massacre is commonly thought of as having led to their complete destruction, several Charrúa communities did survive in neighbouring Argentina and Brazil after the massacre, with official numbers estimating their descendants to number between 160,000 and 300,000 in Uruguay, Argentina, and Brazil. Among them, many of them have publicly promoted and reclaimed their Charrúa identity: the Asociación de Descendientes de la Nación Charrúa (ADENCH, English: Association of the Descendants of the Charrúa Nation) was founded in August 1989 to conserve and promote the history, knowledge and culture of the Charrúa, and the organisation Consejo de la Nación Charrúa (CONACHA, English: Council of the Charrúa Nation) was founded in 2005 by 10 communities and organisations to advocate for the recognition and self-identification of Uruguayan indigenous peoples.

In present-day Uruguay, the name of the Charrúa has acquired mythical connotations of strength, valor, pride and victory in war, especially in a sporting context. The phrase garra charrúa ("Charrúa claw/Charrúa strength") became associated with the Uruguayan national football team following their victory in the 1935 South American Championship, referring to the team's victory in the face of adversity struggles with injuries, as well as the lineup's relative youth and inexperience compared to their vastly more experienced Argentinian and Peruvian opponents.
