= Charruan playing cards =

Deck of cards made of painted leather

The Charruan playing cards were a deck of cards made of pieces of leather with paintings, probably created by Tacuabé. These are characterized by being a cultural loan from the Spanish deck to which distinct Charruan elements were added.

According to Renzo Pi Hugarte (2014), the original cards from this deck—which belonged to the Charruan who were forcibly brought to France in 1833 (Vaimaca Pirú, Senacua Senaqué, Laureano Tacuabé and Micaela Guyunusa)—were lost, but what was preserved was the copy of these made by phrenologist Pierre-Marie Alexandre Dumoutier around the 1830s. In 1930, Paul Rivet published part of the unpublished manuscripts of Dumoutier, among which was the reproduction of the original cards.

Regarding the types of games played by the Charrua people at that time, there are hints that besides horse racing and boleadoras throwing competitions, they also played card competitions. There were mostly played by men and most of these later entertainments arose from acculturation processes.

== Description ==
Pi Hugarte stated that the deck tried to reproduce the Spanish deck. Rivet (1930) believed that "the Charruan game derived from the European game", but that "curiously, it is influenced by French and Spanish models". Despite the fact of being inspired by European decks, he said that "the stylization of signs and figures are certainly a Charruan creation".

Dumoutier reproduction of the originals depicts thirty cards in three sets of ten cards each ona, which in turn each set has two rows of five cards. Set A corresponds to the Oro suit in the Spanish deck and it is complete, series B resembles carreaux suit of French deck and it is also complete, while Rivet said that regarding series C, it is reciprocate to the baton suit of the Spanish deck. However, Pi Hugarte stated that in series C two suits seemed to have been mixed: swords and batons, the latter whose drawings resembles the shape of the ibirapema maces used by the Guarani people at that time. On the other hand, Pi Hugarte, unlike Dumoutier and Rivet, pointed out that the deck was an incomplete one, which whose development was probably interrupted while its author was crafting the third and fourth suits.

Consequently, the complete deck intended to reproduce a Spanish deck of one of those used in games that require 40 cards, such as those that were popular with gauchos and peasants from the Rio de la Plata at that time.

== List of known cards ==
	1	2	3	4	5	6	7	jack (Note: Dumoutier mistakenly ordered the cards against of the order of the Spanish deck, putting knights before jacks.)	knight	king
Oro or gold (Note: The names of the suits here are from those from European decks which are trying to depict, because there is no known vocabulary of them in Charrua language.)										
Carreaux or diamonds										
Swords	(Note: The drawing of this card is unknown.)									
Batons										
