= Indigenous movements in the Americas =

Due to the world's heavy reliance on oil, resource-heavy countries that had been traditionally agrarian have worked to convert themselves into export sectors in order to participate in global markets. Indigenous people under the nation-state have experienced exclusion and dispossession when the state has negotiated the exploitation of natural resources without taking into account whether or not these resources serve Indigenous peoples. In this sense for many Indigenous populations, the effects of marketization mirror the effects of European conquest in the mid-16th century.

In response, Indigenous political movements have emerged in various countries in North and South America that both seek the right to self-determination and the right to preserve their culture and heritage. One of the ways that these groups organize themselves is by uniting across borders meet similar objectives. The following are examples of groups that have organized in order to be heard on a transnational level. These movements call for Indigenous rights to become a universal right to be acknowledged by all countries with Indigenous populations.

== Transnational organizations ==
=== Coordinator of Indigenous Organizations of the Amazon River Basin (COICA) ===
This organization coordinates the following nine national Amazonian Indigenous organizations:

- Caribbean Amerindian Development Organization (CADO)
- Indigenous Democracy Defense Organization (IDDO)
- Interethnic Association for the Development of the Peruvian Rainforest (AIDESEP)
- Amerindian People’s Association of Guyana (APA)
- Confederation of Indigenous people of Bolivia (CIDOB)
- Coordination of the Indigenous Organizations of the Brazilian Amazon (COIAB)
- Confederation of Indigenous Nationalities of the Ecuadorian Amazon (CONFENIAE)
- Regional Organization of Indigenous Towns of the Amazon
- Federation des Organisations Amerindiennes de Guyane
- Organization Van Inheemsen in Suriname
- Organization of the Indigenous Towns of the Colombian Amazonia

=== Indian Council of South America (CISA) ===
The Indian Council of South America was founded in 1980. It is a non-governmental organization that works in consultation with the Economic and Social Council of the United Nations. This council also seeks to maintain relations with international agencies such as UNESCO, FAO, and WHO. One of CISA’s objectives is to promote respect for the right to life, justice, development, peace, and autonomy of the Indigenous peoples and Nations. CISA also coordinates an exchange of knowledge, experiences, and projects between Indigenous peoples and nations in respect to development that will improve their welfare.

=== International Mayan League ===
One of the most important goals for the International Mayan League is to return to the Mayan balance that was interrupted with the Spanish conquest of 1524. This group, similar to COICA, works to preserve and inform people about the culture of the Mayan people. This group has reached out to other states like Costa Rica and some of the states in the United States in order to carry out activities in the areas of teaching, research, and services. One of the defining factors about this group is that it does not have any formal leadership roles appointed to any one person. Rather, the Mayan League sticks to its ancestral beliefs that all can participate in decision making activity. Some of the problems that the Maya League seeks to combat are racism, repression, marginalization, and poverty. Currently, there is a large population of Maya living in Guatemala.

Mexico has the most adapted modern Maya peoples today; they are from Mayan Yucatec branch, most of them totally integrated into the Mexican economy, from peasants, retail, handcraft or "Maquiladora" factory workers to doctors, engineers and politicians.

Belize also has one of the largest populations of Maya peoples. The issues that they face today include the exploitation of their land, such as logging and the oil industry.

== Indigenous organizations according to country ==
=== Argentina ===
- Indigenous Association of the Republic of Argentina (AIRA)
- National Organization of Indigenous Peoples of Argentina (ONPIA)

=== Barbados ===
Eagle Clan Lokono-Arawaks (who also created and lead the Indigenous Democracy Defense Organization)

=== Belize ===
- Belize Indigenous Training Institute
- Caribbean Organization of Indigenous Peoples (COIP)

=== Bolivia ===
- Confederation of Indigenous people of Bolivia, previously known as Indigenous Confederation of the East, Chaco, and Bolivian Amazon (CIDOB)
- Sole Syndical Confederation of Rural Workers of Bolivia (CSUTCB)
- National Council of Ayllus and Markas of Qollasuyu (CONAMAQ)
- Organization of Aymara Women of Kollasuyo

=== Brazil ===
- Coordination of the Indigenous Organizations of the Brazilian Amazon (COIAB)
- Coordinating Council of Indigenous Peoples and Organizations of Brazil (CAPOIB)
- Indianist Missionary Council (CIMI)
- Indigenous Council of Roraima
- Pro-Yanomami Commission (CCPY)
- Union of Indigenous Nations of Acre and South of the Amazon (UNI-AC)
- Articulation of Indigenous Peoples of the South Region - Arpin-South

=== Canada ===
- Assembly of First Nations
- Métis National Council
- Inuit Tapiriit Kanatami
- Pauktuutit
- Native Women's Association of Canada
- Centre for Indigenous Sovereignty
- Congress of Aboriginal Peoples
- First Peoples National Party of Canada
- National Centre for First Nations Governance

=== Chile ===
- Council of All the Mapuche Lands (CTLTM)
- Nehuen-Mapu Mapuche Association
- Nankuchew Indigenous Association of Nag-Che Territory
- Development and Communications Organization, Xeg-Xeg Mapuche

=== Colombia ===
- National Indigenous Organization of Colombia (ONIC)
- Movement of Indigenous Authorities of Colombia (AICO)
- Organization of Indigenous Peoples of the Colombian Amazon (OPIAC)
- Authorities of Traditional U’wa Indigenous of Boyaca
- Council of Embera Katio Alto Sinu
- Regional Indigenous Counsel of Cauca (CRIC)
- Indigenous Organization of Antioquia

=== Costa Rica ===
- National Indigenous Table of Costa Rica
- Regional Aboriginal Association of Dikes (ARADIKES)
- Bribri Cabagra Indigenous Association

=== Dominican Republic ===
- Higuayagua Taino of the Caribbean
- Guabancex-viento y Agua

=== Ecuador ===
- Confederation of Indigenous Nationalities of Ecuador (CONAIE)
- Confederation of Indigenous Nationalities of the Ecuadoran Amazon (CONFENIAE)
- Confederation of Peoples of Kichua National of Ecuador (ECUARUNARI)
- National Confederation of Campesino, Indigenous, and Black Organizations (FENOCIN)
- Ecuadorian Federation of Evangelical Indigenous (FEINE)
- Scientific Institute of Indigenous Cultures

=== El Salvador ===
- Coordinating Association of Indigenous Communities of El Salvador
- National Association of Indigenous Salvadoran (Asociación Nacional Indígena Salvadoreña)
- National Indigenous Coordinating Council of El Salvador

=== Guatemala ===
- Coordination of Organizations of the Maya People of Guatemala Saqb’ichill (COPMAGUA)
- National Coordination of Widows of Guatemala (CONAVIGUA)
- National Indigenous and Campesino Coordination (CONIC)
- Maya Defenders
- Rigoberta Menchu Tum Foundation

=== Guyana ===
- Federation of Amerindian Organizations of Guyana (FOAG)
- Amerindian Peoples’ Association of Guyana (APA)

=== Honduras ===
- Civic Council of Popular and Indigenous Organizations of Honduras (COPINH)
- Confederation of Autochthonous Peoples of Honduras (CONPAH)

=== Mexico ===
- National Pluralistic Indigenous Assembly for Autonomy
- National Indigenous Congress (CNI)
- National Coordination of Indigenous Women
- National Confederation of Coffee Grower Organizations (CNOC)
- Organization of Traditional Indigenous Doctors and Midwives of Chiapas (COMPITCH)
- Guerreran Counsel 500 Years of Indigenous Resistance
- Tepeyac Human Rights Center of the Isthmus of Tehuantepec
- Union of Indigenous Communities in the Northern Zone of the Isthmus (UCIZONI)
- Zapatista Army of National Liberation (EZLN)
- Popular Indigenous Council of Oaxaca "Ricardo Flores Magón"

=== Nicaragua ===
- Communitarian Miskito Nation
- Association of Indigenous Women on the Atlantic Coast (AMICA)
- Indigenous Movement of Jinotega (MIJ)

=== Panama ===
- National Coordination of Indigenous Peoples of Panama (COONAPIP)
- General Congress of Kuna Culture (CGCK)
- Institute for the Integral Development of Kuna Yala (IDIKY)
- Movement of Kuna Youth (of the General Kuna Congress)
- Ngobe-Bugle General Congress

=== Paraguay ===
- Coordination of Indigenous Peoples of the Cuenca of Pilcomayo River
- Native League for Autonomy, Justice, and Ethics

=== Peru ===
- Permanent Coordination of Indigenous Peoples of Peru (COPPIP)
- Interethnic Association of Development of the Peruvian Jungle (AIDESPEP)
- Native Federation of Madre de Díos River and Streams (FENAMAD)
- Rehabilitation of the amuna, a traditional aquifer

=== Puerto Rico ===
- El Movimiento Indio Taino de Boriken
- United Confederation of Taino People (UCTP)
- Taino Tribal Nation of Boriken
- Turabo Aymaco Taino Tribe of Puerto Rico
- Consejo General de Tainos Boricanos
- Concilio Taíno Guatu-Ma-cu A Borikén

=== Suriname ===
- Organization of the Indigenous of Suriname

=== Uruguay ===
- Association of Descendants of the Charrúa Nation (ADENCH)
- Council of the Charrúa Nation (CONACHA)

=== Venezuela ===
- National Indian Council Venezuela (CONIVE)
- Regional Organization of Indigenous Amazonian Peoples (ORPIA)

=== United States ===
- American Indian Movement
- International Indian Treaty Council
- National Congress of American Indians
- National Indian Youth Council
- Native American Rights Fund
- Mexica Movement

== Indigenous movements in Latin America by country ==
Latin America has a growing Indigenous rights movement. Groups within countries have done work to publicize Indigenous rights in their respective countries.

=== Transnational movements ===
Transnational movements have helped publicize the Indigenous rights movement in Latin America. In the 1990s, many new Indigenous political movements forms due to support from allies. Political collaboration, with multilateral agencies and NGOs, has been integral for the progress of Indigenous peoples.

The first Peruvian president of Indigenous origin, Alejandro Toledo (Quechua), served from 2001 to 2006. This marked the first time that someone of Indian descent led Peru since the 1930s.

Transnational organizations have been credited for contributing to Cué's victory in Mexico. The Front of Binational Organizations (FIOB), one of the most active Indigenous organizations in Mexico, is credited for this feat. Transnational movements like the FIOB "represents a broad network of relationships, organizational structures, and cultural traditions." Solidarity is one of the main attributes for the success of transnational movements.

Global transnational movements also influence regional movements. For example, since the UN Declaration on the Rights of Indigenous People was passed, progress has been made for Indigenous rights.

Transnational movements have shifted their focus towards environmental rights. As deforestation occurs in areas such as the Amazon, many movements aim to work in solidarity to bring these secondary issues to light. Amazon Watch is one non-governmental organization that aims to publicize the plight of deforestation in the Amazon in regards to the lives of Indigenous peoples. Oil drilling is one issue that Amazon Watch fights against. A pipeline spill in the Peruvian Amazon highlights the plight of Indigenous protests. Five Indigenous communities sought to remediate the polluted sites and gain compensation for damages to their land. This shift has helped to gain more awareness as environmental protection becomes more important in the rights for Indigenous peoples. The Dakota Access Pipeline protests is one example of the fight for Indigenous rights to sacred land in the United States. More than 40% of the Standing Rock Sioux Tribe live below the poverty line and this pipeline could negatively affect both the environment and well-being of the tribe. Similarly, the Escobal mine protests in Guatemala have centered around both environmental issues and the land sovereignty of the Indigenous Xinca people.

=== Brazil ===
==== Background ====
Indigenous rights have largely been ignored throughout Brazil's history. They were considered "second-class citizens" and much of their land was taken away for economic development. Brazil is also historically known for the "physical and cultural extermination of the Indigenous peoples." However, the Indigenous movement in Brazil has largely grown since the 1980s. Although policies have been changed to include the rights of the Indigenous peoples, it ignores the collective right to their land.

===== Cases =====
The 2002 Xucuru case in Brazil highlights the role of the state in the struggle of present-day Indigenous peoples in Brazil. The Inter-American Commission on Human Rights was asked to safeguard Marcos de Araújo, after they received death threats regarding their right to Indigenous land. The state rejected this request because of various reasons. Much of the Indian rights movement in Brazil focus on right to land, and not individual liberties. Although Indigenous tribes are marginalized and largely unrepresented in government, Brazil's Articulation of Indigenous People's have staged protests around major cities in Brazil to focus on fighting for territorial rights of the native peoples. The result of this issue shows that "constitutional recognition of Indigenous human rights and a multicultural and collectivist perspective does not eliminate the legal and political obstacles to implementing those rights."

== See also ==
- Pan-Indianism
- List of Indigenous rights organizations
- Indigenous peoples of the Americas
- Zapatista Army of National Liberation
