= Guriurius =

Scientific classification
- Kingdom: Animalia
- Phylum: Arthropoda
- Subphylum: Chelicerata
- Class: Arachnida
- Order: Araneae
- Infraorder: Araneomorphae
- Family: Salticidae
- Subfamily: Salticinae
- Genus: Guriurius; Marta, Bustamante, Ruiz & Rodrigues, 2022

Type species
- G. minuano Marta, Bustamante, Ruiz & Rodrigues, 2022

Species
- 2, see text

Genus of spiders

Guriurius is a genus of spiders in the family Salticidae.

== Distribution ==
Guriurius is found in South America, with species occurring in Brazil, Uruguay, and Argentina.

== Etymology ==
The genus name is a combination of "guri" ("boy" in southern Brazil gaúcho culture) and the related genus Hurius. The species are named after the Minuano ethnic group, and Brazilian arachnologist Nancy F. Lo-Man-Hung.

== Species ==
As of January 2026, this genus includes two species:

- Guriurius minuano Marta, Bustamante, Ruiz & Rodrigues, 2022 – Brazil, Uruguay, Argentina
- Guriurius nancyae Marta, Bustamante, Ruiz & Rodrigues, 2022 – Brazil
