= María Micaela Guyunusa =

Charrúa Indian who survived the massacre of Salsipuedes, only to die in France

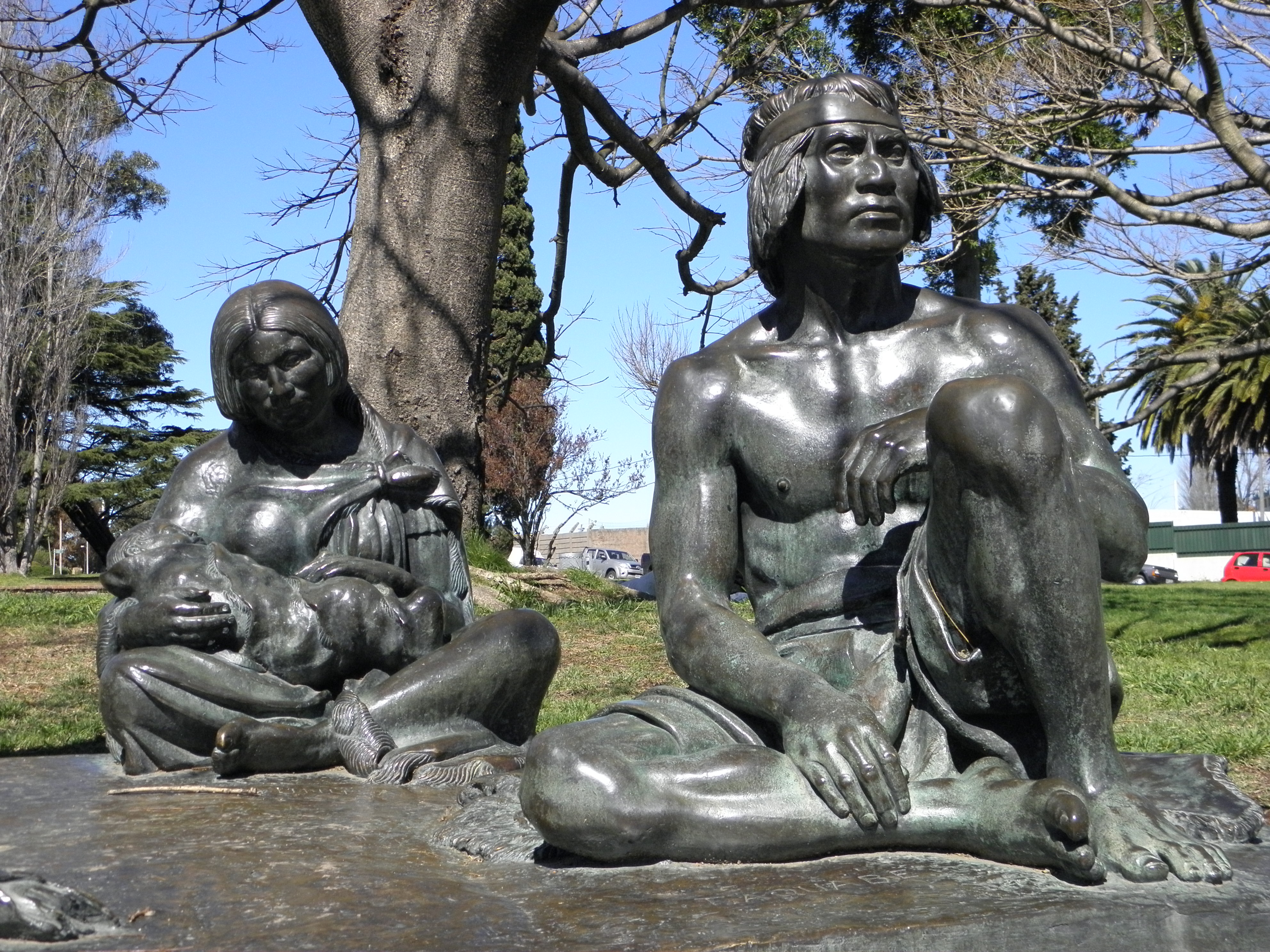
- Guyunusa with her baby daughter and Tacuavé. Part of the sculpture Los últimos charrúas by Edmundo Prati, Gervasio Furest and Enrique Lussich; Parque Prado, Montevideo.
- Born: María Micaëla Guyunusa; September 28, 1806; Paysandú, Empire of Brazil (now in Uruguay)
- Died: July 22, 1834 (aged 27); Lyon, Paris, France
- Burial place: Lyon
- Other names: Michaëla Jougousa; Michella Gununusa
- Partner: Laureano Tacuavé Martínez
- Children: 2

María Micaela Guyunusa (September 28, 1806 in Paysandú, Uruguay – July 22, 1834 in Paris, France) was a Minuán-Charrúa native from present day Uruguay of Güenoa descent.

== Identity ==
María Micaëla Guyunusa's mother was the Charrúa, María Rosa, born in what is today Paysandú, a department of Uruguay. She was raised as a Christian with Spaniard customs. The name Micaëla was chosen by her mother in memory of Micaela Bastidas Puyucahua, a native killed by the Spanish power in the eighteenth century. María Micaëla Guyunusa was born in an Indigenous village in the eastern coast of Uruguay (Paysandú), in a time of war. Micaëla was baptized by the Indigenous Victória Cambyaé and European expatriate Manuel Medína, at ten months of age by Silverio Antonio Martínez on July 26, 1807. Also, she was described as having her head "prominently elevated. She had less ability than Tacuavé with the steering wheel. She's more indolent, can sing and is accompanied by her violin. Her manner of speech is sweet.” Guyunusa was described to having "three blue stripes that extend vertically on the forehead from the hairline to the tip of her nose...", which were common for a female Minuán of her age, being that indigenous women were tattooed with the three stripes after first menstruating.

=== Biography ===
At five years of age, Guyunusa accompanied her people in the escort to the Exodus of the Western People. After 1820, her people were forced into exile. She grew up in the hills, in the Maroon resistance against the Portuguese, and as a teenager she and the charrúas supported the quest of leading the Thirty-Three Orientals. Her first son was born in the time that there was still hope for Ituzaingó and Sarandí to save the Uruguayan natives.

However, the Eastern State organized in 1830, which should have given the Charruas a place of respect, cruelly chased them. The son of Guyunusa was separated violently from his mother in the distributions of children after the ambush of Salsipuedes, Queguay Pass and residence of Bonifacio.

After the European conquest and colonization, the Charrúa population declined at the hands of local authorities, being practically exterminated in a massacre led by Bernabé Rivera on 11 April 1831.

Four surviving Charrúa were captured at Salsipuedes, on February 25, 1833: Guyunusa; her partner, young warrior, Laureano Tacuavé Martínez; Senacua Sénaqué, a 56-year-old medicine man and warrior; and Vaimaca-Perú Perico Sira, a 55-year-old warrior (cacique in charrúa) who was a very close friend and general of Karaí-Guasú. All four were taken to Paris, France, by François Curel on November 11, 1833, where they were exhibited to the public as a circus attraction.

Guyunusa and Vaimaca gave birth a few months after they were taken to a daughter, named María Mónica Micaëla Igualdad Libertad (filed as Caroliné Tacouavé by the French). Guyunusa played a violin and sang when in her pregnancy.

== Guyunusa and daughter's fate ==
=== Original hypothesis ===
Pirú, Sénaqué and Guyunusa died during the first year in France. Micaëla died of tuberculosis and was buried in a mass grave for deaths of contagious diseases in the city of Lyon. Eventually they all died in France, including the baby.

=== Anna Donner Rybak ===
On October 10, 2010, Anna Donner Rybak, an Uruguayan author, published a personal hypothesis. First came the deaths of Vaimaca and Senacua:

"They did not adapt to the change of environment, they missed their families and could not stand the abuse, leading to their death, submerged in depression. -- The cause of death of Sénaqué, in June, was fever, fatigue and weakness. Two months later, under the same conditions Vaimaca ceased to exist. -- Senaqué, died at age 56, Allée d'Antin No. 19, on July 26, 1833 -- Vaimaca Peru. Chief Indian tribe, (America), died at age 55, (street) Chaussée d'Antin n ° 27, 13 September 1833."

She later wrote that Guyunusa, Tacuavé and the baby were assisted by local woman to escape, yet both Micaëla and daughter Caroliné died that same year:

"Guyunusa of 26 years of age, after four months of arriving in Paris, gave birth to a girl, daughter of Vaimaca Pirú. These two along with Tacuabé (23 years) were released thanks to the efforts of a group of ladies horrified by the treatment of the indigenous. -- Guyunusa dies of tuberculosis at the Hospital of Lyon, in July 1834. Tacuavé fled with the child, whereabouts unknown." -- "On July 23, 1834 at eleven o'clock in the morning, intendant of Lyon before us, have appeared Anthelme Nochet, 36 years and Tissot Etienne, 55 years, employees in the hospital of the sick of this city, who have stated that Micaëla Guyunusa, twenty-six, born near the River Uruguay (Meridional America) domiciled in Cour des Archers, No. ... wife of ... Tacuabé who has no trade, died yesterday evening at nine. Reading made this record to respondents, these have signed with us." -- "Tacuabé, young warrior, is studying French language and when he complets his studies Mr. Virey (Professor), will make him do his report on the four academies and twelve academics." -- "On August 29, 1834 at a quarter past two in the afternoon, intendant of Lyon before us have appeared Jules Lalounet, thirty-five years - painter and decorator, great street Mercière n° 56 and Jean Jacques Chardonnet, forty years traiteur same house, who have stated that Caroline Tacouabé, a year, a native of Paris, daughter of Laurent home, living in the said house and Michella Gununusa deceased has died yesterday evening at four hours. Reading this record made of respondents have signed with us: Lalounet Chardonnet".

Donner Rybak also published found documents from Spanish men that visited the called saveges while in imprisonment:

"(…) At first they felt a little distrustful of the presence of 15 or 20 strangers. But soon after, they felt more comfortable and as they understood and spoke fairly good Spanish and Portuguese - besides learning French with ease - they were able to answer questions put to them by some of the visitors. (…)" -- "Finally, the woman who accompanied the three Charrúas, and that is of the same tribe, is called Guyunusa; she formed part of the last concentration usually destroyed by the Ribéra; she was driven prey with some of her fellow tribe women, the same time as Perú and Sénaqué. We could not procure any information about what the person concerned; seems to be grown fond of the young Tacuavé Martinez."

=== New documents ===
It is said that Laureano Tacuavé and María Mónica Igualdad escaped from the exhibit shortly after Micaela's death. In 2012 documents were found indicating that the child (Caroliné Tacouabé) died of tuberculosis just like her mother, and that Laureano adopted the life of a French and probably died of sickness or age.

== Memorial and tributes ==
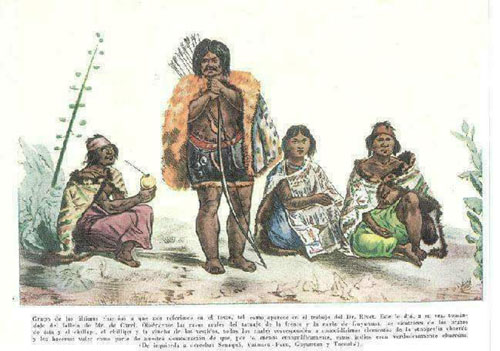
The last Charrúas in 1833

In Montevideo, Uruguay there is a monument called The Last Charrúas, (Los últimos charrúas in Spanish). Montevideo also has a school with an astronomical observatory named after Guyunusa in the street Ituzaingó.

In the year 2000, Mercedes Vigil, an author, published a book named Hijas de la Providencia, narrating six female based topics. Author, Aníbal Barrios Pintos wrote a book called Los Aborigenes del Uruguay, informing about Tacuavé Martínez, Jougousa Gununusa and the other Charrúas. In 2009 Uruguayan journalist and reporter Gabriela Fuentes published her book, Protagonistas y olvidadas, which is dedicated to little known women, who are important in Uruguayan history, including Micaëla.

On October 18, 2011, in the department of Paysandú, Road 24 was renamed in tribute and respect to Guyunusa.

=== Mataojo ===
They were not the first to set seas to France, a young (said to be about 18 to 20 years old) "cacique" named by a traveling Spanish ship Lieutenant, Louis Mario Barral as Ramón Mataojo, (being that the native was found in "el río Mataojo grande") had traveled to France in January 1832.

== See also ==
- Laureano Tacuavé Martínez
- Charrúa people
