= Grandmother of the Uruguayans =

South American indigenous woman of Uruguay

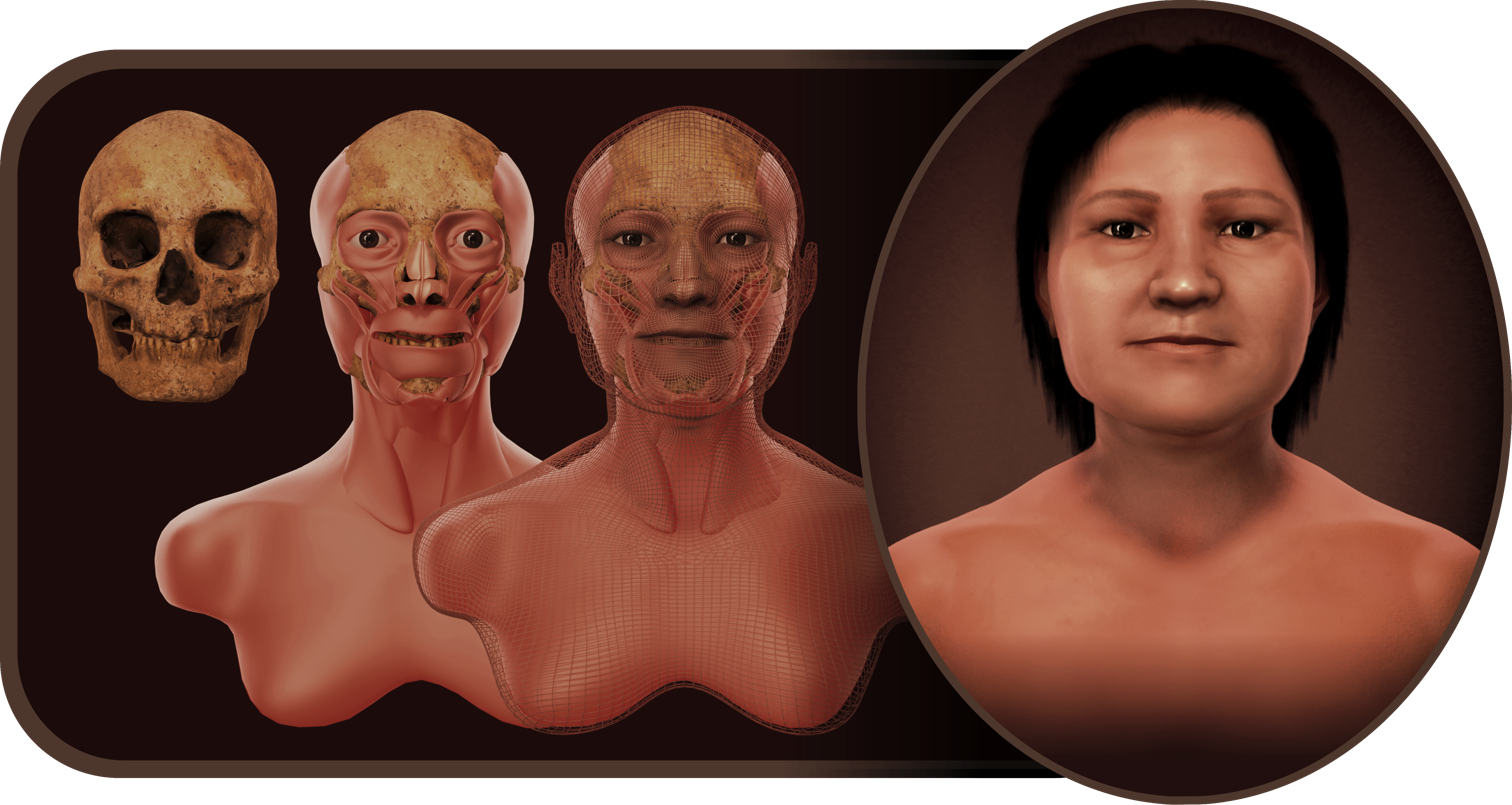
- Born: Unknown date Unknown place
- Died: 5th century Rocha Department, Uruguay
- Body discovered: Rocha Department, Uruguay
- Known for: Being one of the earliest humans so far identified, who lived in what is today Uruguay.

The Grandmother of the Uruguayans (Spanish: Abuela de los uruguayos), as she is known because there is no record of her name, was a South American Indigenous woman deceased approximately since at least 1600 years ago counted backwards from 2012, whose skeleton is the oldest one that has been found so far in the territory of what is nowadays known as Uruguay. In 2018, an approximate digital facial reconstruction from her skull was made.

== Discovery and identification ==
The skull and the skeleton of this woman were found 30 years ago during an excavation conducted by researchers of the School of Humanities and Sciences of the University of the Republic under one of the indian mounds in Rocha Department, where she was buried.

In 2012, a phalanx bone was sent to the laboratory of the Physics Department of the University of Arizona to find out the approximate date of death. The results of the analysis shown that the woman died about 1600 years ago, being approximately 45 years of age. The analysis also shown that the woman's DNA contained a variant only present in Uruguay, and was specifically present in the genetic code of the Charruan chief Vaimaca Pirú and in a handful of living people in the present time, not being descendants but distant living relatives of about fifty generations.

== Facial reconstruction ==
On the occasion of his visit to Uruguay in November 2018, the Brazilian specialist in forensic facial reconstruction Cícero Moraes proposed the director of the Museum of Pre-Columbian and Indigenous Art in Montevideo (MAPI), Facundo de Almeida, to perform a facial reconstruction of a skull representative of Uruguay, something that he did in every country he visited. Not having in museum's inventory any skulls of Indigenous peoples of Uruguay, the director of MAPI requested to the Department of Anthropology of the School of Humanities and Sciences of the University of the Republic any Indigenous skull to work from, and this Department offered the skull of the Grandmother of the Uruguayans that died approximately 1600 years ago.

The undergraduate student of anthropology Luis Vázquez carried out the scanning process using the photogrammetry technique, taking 120 photos of the skull from different angles, that subsequently sent to Moraes for the digital reconstruction. Moraes then digitalized the anatomy in 3D with the plugin OrtogOnBlender of the free software program Blender. After that, jointly with anthropology specialists defined a series of reference markers to foresee the likely location of the soft tissues, using as a reference statistical studies of measurements of hundreds of persons. Then, the projections of the nose, lips, ears and ocular orbits were delimited. Lastly, the digital sculpture was finished and hair and skin colors were added.

The produced work, which does not represent an exact facial reconstruction but an approximation or projection of how the woman could have been, took about seven days. The result of the reconstruction depicts a woman of 35 to 45 years of age of Indigenous origin with some East Asian-like features, with dark eyes and a slight copper colored skin, and prominent cheekbones, with a slight smile. The woman was nicknamed the "Grandmother of the Uruguayans", or at least from part of the Uruguayans, due to recent studies that discovered that demonstrated that there is a greater of Indigenous genetic presence in modern Uruguayans rather than was previously thought.

In November 2018, the result of the reconstruction was exhibited at the Museum of Pre-Columbian and Indigenous Art. This reconstruction was incorporated into the permanent exhibition of the museum.

== See also ==
- Indigenous peoples of Uruguay
