= Tabaré (poem) =

1886 epic poem by Juan Zorrilla de San Martín

Tabaré is an epic poem written by Uruguayan poet Juan Zorrilla de San Martín.

Written in 1886, it was first published in 1888. It comprises 4736 verses divided into 10 cantos. The love story between the aboriginal Tabaré and the Spaniard Blanca is a metaphor of the fate of the Charrúa people, who originally inhabited the Banda Oriental.
