= Pampero (wind) =

Wind in South America

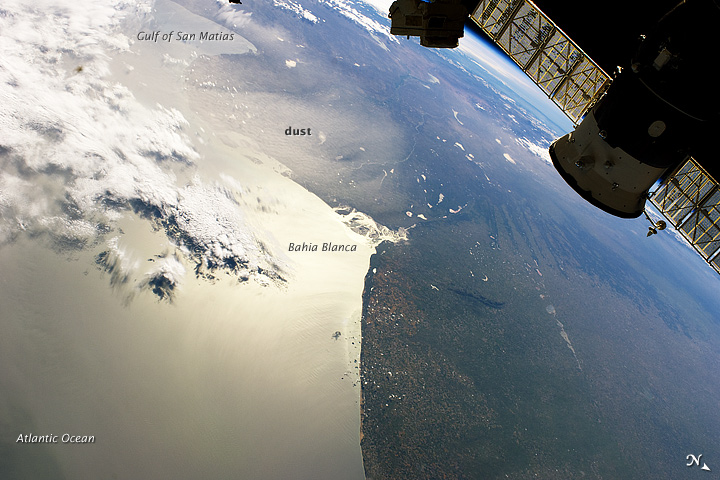

The pampero is a burst of cold polar air from the west, southwest, or south on the pampas in the south of Brazil, Argentina, Uruguay, Paraguay and Bolivia. This wind (often violently) picks up during the passage of a cold front of an active low passing by. It takes the form of a squall line and there is a marked drop in temperature after its passage. The Pampero is most common in winter in the Southern Hemisphere (principally between May and August). During the summers in the region around Buenos Aires, the pampero storms are a welcome feature, marking the end of long periods of high humidity and extreme heat.

== Sources ==
- Wind names at ggweather.com. Accessed Jan 2009
- Penguin Dictionary of Geography, W G Moore, 1949

== See also ==
- Minuano
- Zonda wind
- Pampas
