= Fernández, Salto =

Fernández Mataojo
- Populated centre
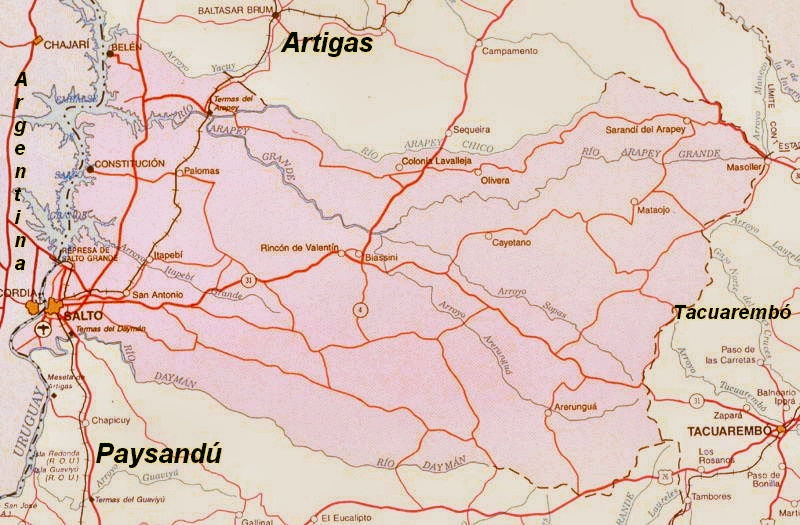

- Location in Uruguay
- Coordinates: 31°10′35″S 56°22′14″W
- Country: Uruguay
- Department: Salto Department

Fernández, also known as Mataojo, is a small populated centre in the eastern part of the Salto Department of northwestern Uruguay.

== Geography ==
It is situated on the south bank of stream Arroyo Mataojo Chico, about 22 kilometres (14 mi) east-southeast of its confluence with Arapey Grande River. About 17 kilometres (11 mi) to its southwest flows the stream Mataojo Grande and about 16 kilometres (9.9 mi) to its southeast is a hill also named Mataojo.

== History ==
One of the last massacres of the Charrúas, by a force led by Bernabé Rivera, happened in the area of Mataojo on 17 August 1831.

Ramón Mataojo was the name given to a Charrúan warrior of 18–20 years of age who was captured near the stream Arroyo Mataojo Grande in 1831. In January 1832, he was sent across the Atlantic as a living specimen for the Academy of Sciences of Paris. Due to disagreements of various officials, however, he had to remain on board the L’Emulatión, the ship that carried him, until his death in October of that year. He is credited as the first Charrúan to have crossed the Atlantic.

== Population ==
Its population during the 2011 census was 305.
