= Charruan languages =

Language family of South America

Charruan
- Geographic distribution: Argentina (Entre Ríos Province); Brazil (formerly); Uruguay (formerly)
- Ethnicity: Chaná people, Charrúa people, Guenoa people
- Extinct: 17 September 2026, with the death of Blas Wilfredo Omar Jaime
- Linguistic classification: One of the world's primary language families
- Proto-language: Proto-Charruan
- Subdivisions: Charrúa †; Chaná †; Güenoa †

Language codes
- Glottolog: char1238
- Linguasphere: 85-DC
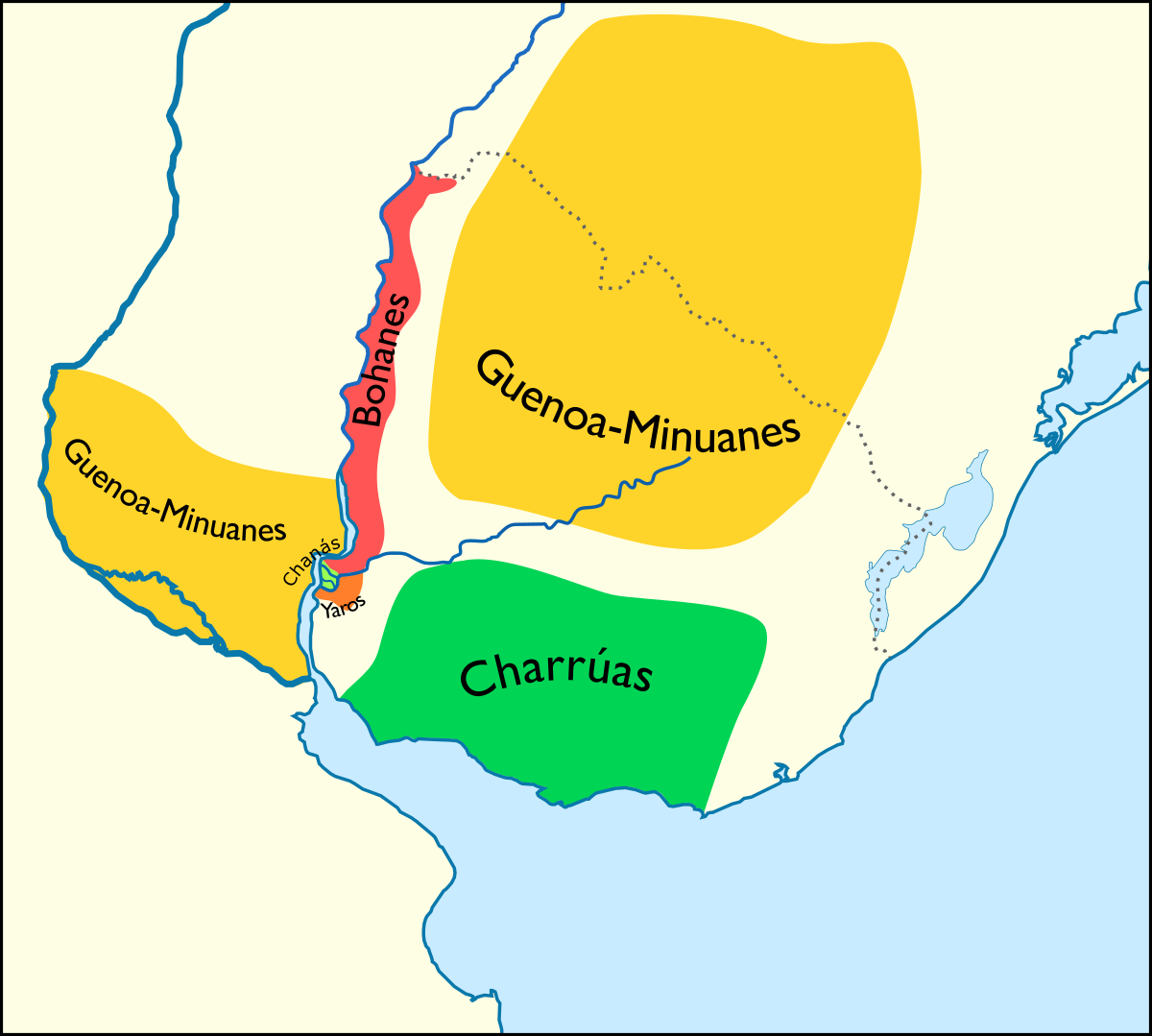
- Pre-contact distribution of the Charruan languages

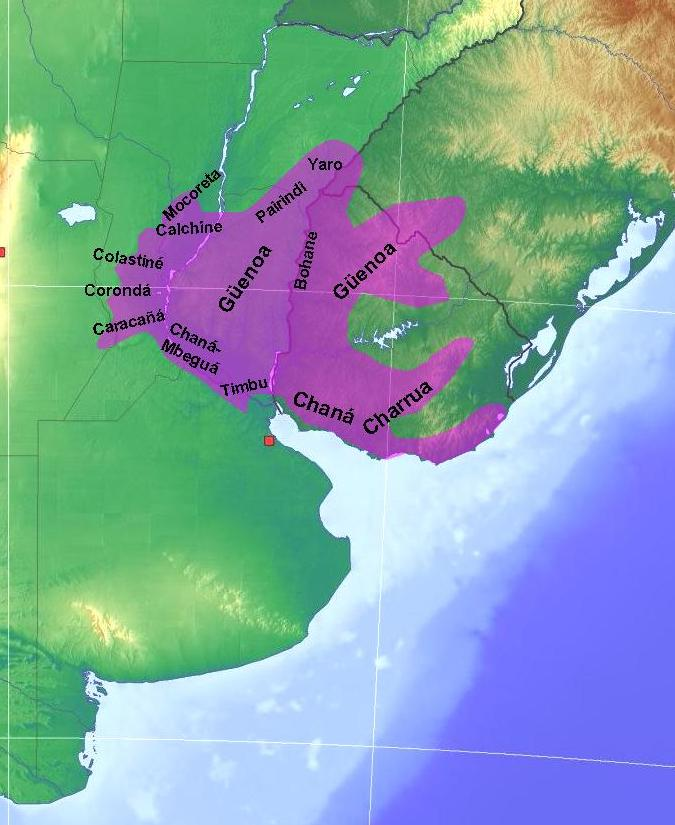
- Distribution of Charruan languages according to Loukotka (1968).

The Charruan languages are a language family once spoken in Uruguay and the Argentine province of Entre Ríos. In 2005, a semi-speaker of the Chaná language, Blas Wilfredo Omar Jaime, was found in Entre Ríos Province, Argentina.

== Internal coherence ==
Charruan may actually consist of two or three unrelated families according to Nikulin (2019). Nikulin notes that many of the following languages share very few basic vocabulary items with each other.

1. Chaná as spoken by Blas Wilfredo Omar Jaime
2. Chaná of Larrañaga (1923)
3. Charrúa of Vilardebó (1842)
4. Güenoa from a short 18th-century catechesis quoted by Lorenzo Hervás y Panduro

== Languages ==
Four languages are considered to definitively belong to the Charruan language family, Chaná (Lanték), Mbeguá, Charrúa and Guenoa.

- Charruan languages
  - Chaná †
  - Mbeguá, "Beguá", or "Chaná-Beguá" †
  - Charrúa †
  - Güenoa (Minuan) †

== Genetic relations ==
Jorge Suárez includes Charruan with Guaicuruan in a hypothetical Waikuru-Charrúa stock. Morris Swadesh includes Charruan along with Guaicuruan, Matacoan, and Mascoyan within his Macro-Mapuche stock. Both proposals appear to be obsolete.

== Proto-language ==
=== Consonants ===
Consonant phonemes of proto-Charruan
p	t	tʃ	t𐞩	k	(ʔ)
	(tʰ)			kʰ	
b	d	ʒ	d𐞩	g	
(ꞵ)	s	ʃ		x	h
		sʲ			
			ɾ		
	l	(lʲ)			
	r				
m	n	ɲ			
w		j			

=== Vowels ===
Vowel phonemes of proto-Charruan
	Front	Central	Back
Close	i		u
Mid	e		o
Open		a	

== Vocabulary ==
The Charruan languages are poorly attested. However, sufficient vocabulary has been gathered for the languages to be compared:

English	Charrua	Chaná	Güenoa
me	m'	mi-tí	hum
you	m'	mutí /em/ baté	m
we		rampti/ am-ptí	rambuí
eye	i-hou	ocál	
ear	i-mau / i-man	timó	
mouth	ej	hek / obá	
hand	guar	nam	
foot / toe	atit	eté	
water	hué	atá	
sun		dioi	
dog	lohán	agó	
white		huok	
one	yú	u-gil / ngui	yut
two	sam	usan / amá	
three	detí / datit	detit / heít	detit
know	sepé	seker	
good / nice	bilú	oblí / oblé	
brother/sister	inchalá	nchalá	
friend	huamá	uamá	
why? / how?		retám	retanle*
who?		ua-reté	
past (suf.)		ndau / nden	edam

Lexical comparison from Nikulin (2019):

gloss	Chana (Jaime)	Chana (Larrañaga 1923)	Charrúa	Guenoa
we		ampti / am-, rampti		rambui
give	ará	da.jú		
sun	dioi	diói		
go	nderé	do	bajiná 'to walk'	
thou		empti em- / m-		
one	gilí / güi	gil: ugil 'único'	yú ~ yu	yut isa 'only one'
who		guareptí		guárete
sand	lgorí	han		
mouth	uvá	hek	ej	
that		huati / huat-		
white	noá	huóc		
good		latár		
hear	timotéc	montéc		
come	nderé	na		
not	reé	=mén		
what		r'eca 'what', r'epti		retant 'how many?'
two	amá	san	sam ~ sán	
know		seker, sekér		
see		solá 'mirar'		
mountain		to e		
woman	adá	ukái / kái 'female'		
I		ytí / i- ~ y-		
all	opá			
sleep	utalá		ando diabun 'vamos a dormir'	
foot	vedé verá		atit	
kill	ña		aú	
go	nderé	do	bajiná 'to walk'	
stand	reé utalá		basquadé 'levantarse'	
mouth	uvá	hek	ej	
hand	nam		guar	
moon	aratá		guidai	
water	atá		hué	
nose	utí		ibar	
eye	ocál		ijou	
ear	timó		imau	
head	ta ~ ta ug vedé		is	
hair	moni		itaj	
fire	yogüín		it	
dog	agó		samayoí	
two	amá	san	sam ~ sán	
one	gilí / güi	gil: ugil 'único'	yú ~ yu	yut isa 'only one'
person				ëewuit edam
who		guareptí		guárete
die	ña			hallen
name				hapatam 'his name'
we		ampti / am-, rampti		rambui
what		r'eca 'what', r'epti		retant 'how many?'
one	gilí / güi	gil: ugil 'único'	yú ~ yu	yut isa 'only one'
