= Minuano =

Cold southwesterly wind

Coordinates: 32.0667°S 53.7667°W

Minuano is a cold southwesterly wind that blows in the southern Brazilian state of Rio Grande do Sul and in Uruguay. It has the same name of the indigenous Minuane people in the Portuguese language (in Spanish, the name of that people is Minuán, and the same wind is called pampero in Uruguay). It is widely mentioned in the Gaúcho folklore of the region. This wind originates from cold polar fronts that come from the southwest of South America during periods of high atmospheric pressure, usually following rains caused by the shock of the cold front with warmer stationary humid air. Sometimes it produces a "howling" sound.

== In popular culture ==
The opening track of the 1987 album Still Life (Talking) by American jazz band the Pat Metheny Group is named after the occurrence. The track, written by Metheny and Lyle Mays, was established as the mantra for the album, which prominently features Brazilian jazz-inspired works.

Jazz singer Kurt Elling also did a vocalese version of this same song as the leading cut on his "Man In The Air" album.

"Minuano" was the codename of "Jetstream" Samuel Rodrigues, a character in the video game Metal Gear Rising: Revengeance, who is also Brazilian.

Brazilian singer and composer Rosa Passos wrote a song entitled "Minuano" in her album "Pano Pra Manga".

"Minuano" is the name of a music project led by Japanese musician Takero Ogata, featuring Kaori Sakakibara from Lamp, as the lead vocalist. Their sound is influenced by MPB, jazz, soft rock, and city pop.
