= Minuane =

Total population
- Full-blooded are extinct unknown descendants

Regions with significant populations
- Brazil Uruguay Argentina

Languages
- Minuane language

Religion
- traditional tribal religion

Related ethnic groups
- Charrua, Güenoa, Bohan

Minuane were one of the Native nations of Uruguay, Argentina (specially in the province of Entre Rios) and Brazil (specially in the state of Rio Grande do Sul). Their territory was along the Paraná and Uruguay Rivers. In one source, they are fully identified with the Guenoas, being actually considered the same tribe.

== About ==
They were related to the other tribes in the area like Charrua and Güenoa.

In 1583, the conquistador Juan de Garay was killed in battle against the Minuane nation. The Battle of Yí (batalla del Yí) occurred in 1702 in the Banda Oriental. There, 2000 Guaraníes misioneros and Spanish killed 300 Minuanes, Charrúas and Yaros, and captured 500 more. After 1730, together with the Charruas, they attacked the Spanish invaders in Montevideo in an effort to recover their lands. In 2 campaigns in 1749 and 1750 the governor of Santa Fe, Francisco Antonio de Vera y Mujica, invaded Minuane territory and massacred them in today's city of Victoria in Entre Ríos. Many survivors were captured and translated to the province of Santa Fe, forming a reserve in Cayasta. In 1751, the governor of Montevideo, José Joaquín de Viana killed 120 Charruas-Minuane in Uruguay. Later they allied with José Gervasio Artigas, the Uruguayan national hero.

In Rio Grande do Sul, Brazil, there is a type of wind known as the "Minuano wind" (vento minuano).

== See also ==
- Charrua
- Indigenous peoples in Uruguay
