= Edmundo Prati =

Uruguayan sculptor (1889–1970)

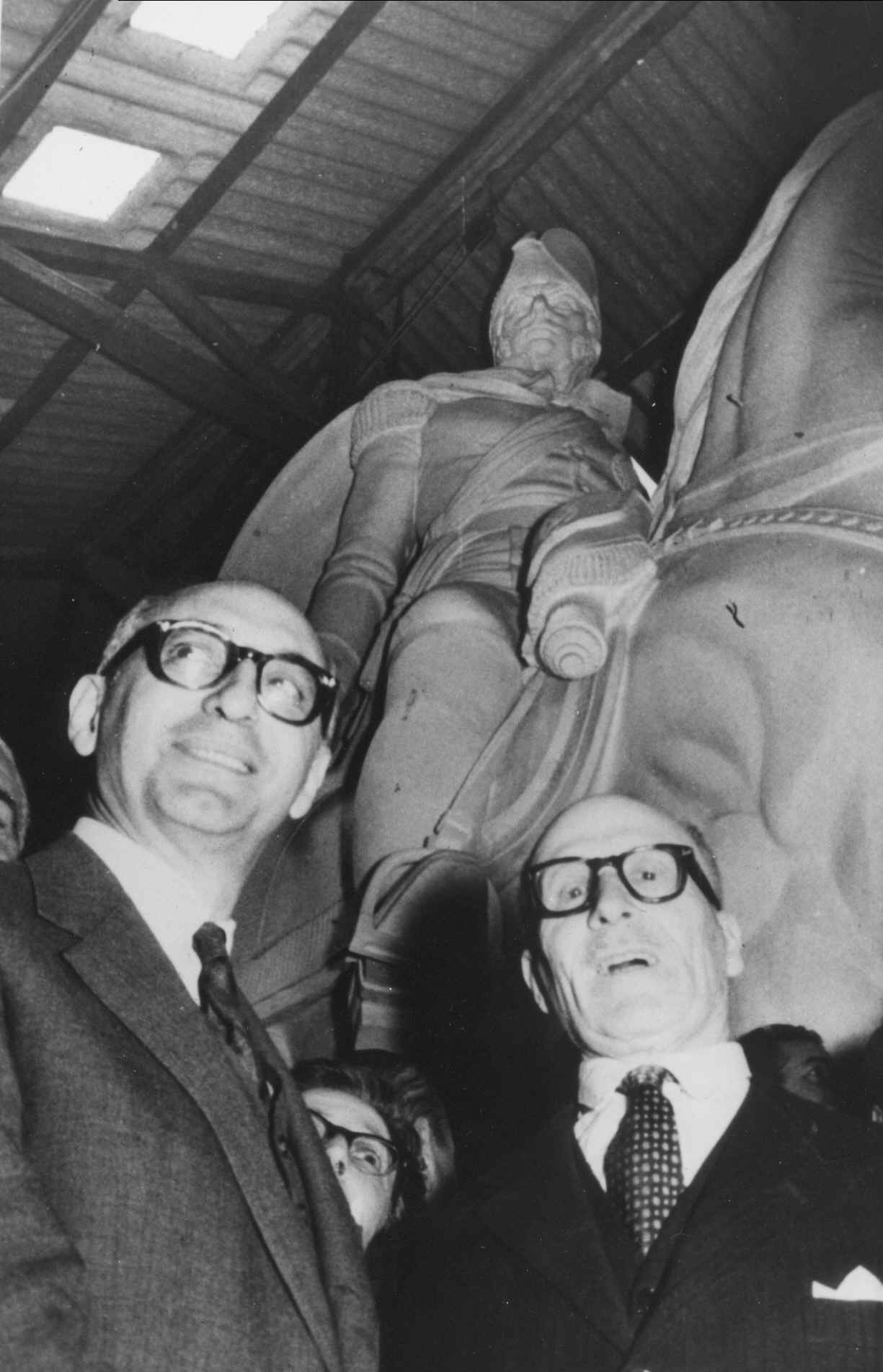
Portrait of Edmundo Prati and Argentine president Arturo Frondizi.

Edmundo Prati (17 April 1889, in Paysandú – 24 November 1970) was a Uruguayan sculptor.

== Selected works ==
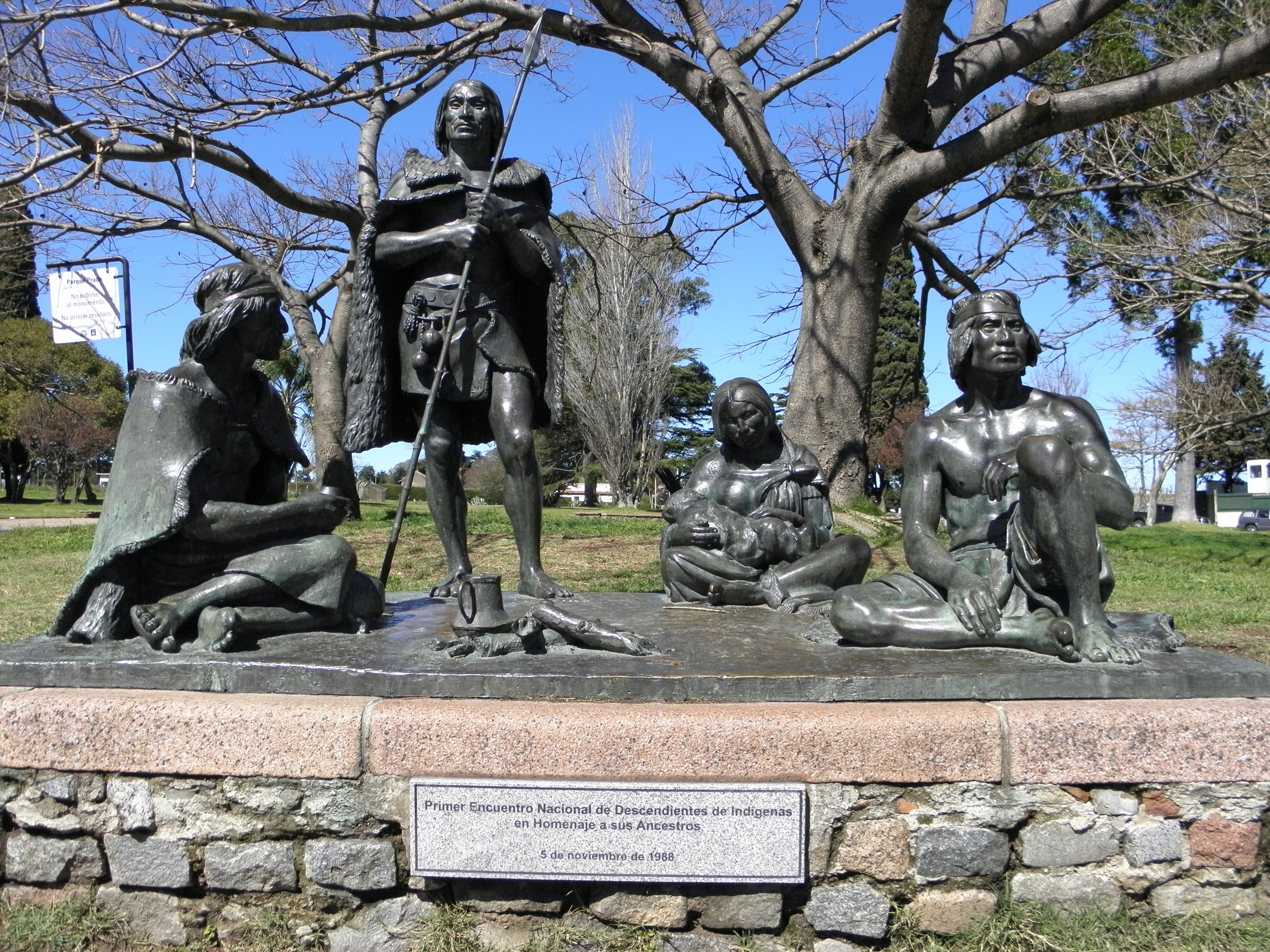
Los últimos charrúas.

- Monument to the Uruguayan national hero José Gervasio Artigas, Plaza Artigas, Salto.
- Monument to the Argentine national hero José de San Martín, Plaza Soldados Orientales de San Martín, Montevideo (with Antonio Pena).
- Monument to the last Charrúa aboriginal people (Spanish: Los últimos charrúas), parque Prado, Montevideo (with Gervasio Furest and Enrique Lussich).
- Monument to the lawyer and politician Luis Alberto de Herrera, Montevideo (with V. Habegger and Jorge Durán Mattos).
- Monument to Franklin Delano Roosevelt, Parque Batlle, Montevideo.
- Monumental statue to José Irureta Goyena, Pocitos, Montevideo.
- Monumental statue The Sawer (Spanish: El Sembrador), Paysandú.
- Monumental statue to Giuseppe Garibaldi, Dolores.
