= Güenoa language =

Extinct Charruan language of South America

Güenoa
- Minuan
- Native to: Uruguay, Argentina
- Ethnicity: Güenoa, Minuane
- Era: attested 1787
- Language family: Charruan: Güenoa

Language codes
- ISO 639-3: None (mis)
- Glottolog: guen1235
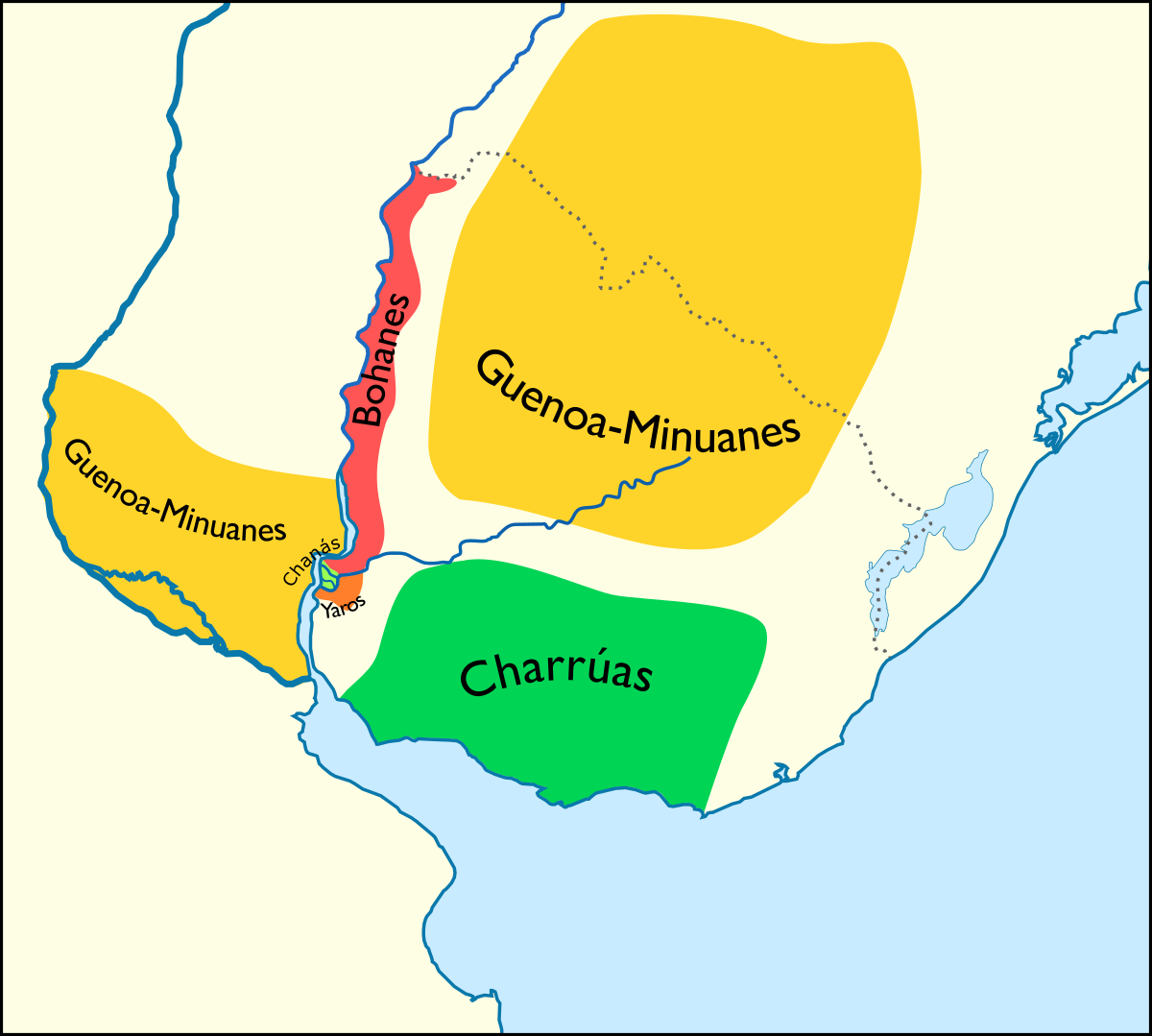
- Güenoa

Güenoa (Minuan) is a sparsely documented, extinct Charruan language once spoken in Uruguay and Argentina.

== Sample text ==
Güenoa is known only from a short 18th-century catechesis quoted by Lorenzo Hervás y Panduro in Italian.

| Güenoa | Italian | English translation |
|---|---|---|
| Mana hum Tupa amat atei | Dimmi, c'è Dio? | Tell me, is there God? |
| An: Tupa amat onat | Sì, Dìo c'è. | Yes, there is. |
| Tupa retant atei? | Dii quanti sono! | Say how many there are! |
| Yut isa | Uno solamente. | Only one. |
| Guar-ete Tupa | Chi è Dìo? | Who is God? |
| On, dik Ineu, dik Espiritu-santo, detit persona | Padre, Figliuolo, Spirito Santo, tre persone, | Father, Son, Holy Spirit, three persons, |
| Tupa yut tem amat | Dio uno solo. | One God. |
| Guarete ëeuvuit edam dik eutemar, esek evvau etsi ueda atei? | Chi è stato, che si è fatto uomo per noi altri? | Who was it, who became man for us? |
| Tupa-ineu | Di Dio il figlio. | God's son. |
| Hapatan retant | Come si chiama? | What was his name? |
| Hesu-Kisto | Gesu Cristo. | Jesus Christ. |
| Hallen atei Hesu-Kisto | Morto fu Gesu Cristo? | Did Jesus Christ die? |
| Hallen | Morì. | He died. |
| Retanle dik hallen? | Per quale fine morì? | Why did he die? |
| Ramudi mar natios taamaban asari | Noi a liberare da nostri peccati, | To free us from our sins. |
| Dik inambi atei? | E vivo ritorno? | And did he return alive? |
| An: onat inambi atei | Sì, che vivo ritornò | Yes, he returned alive. |
| Dik rambui hallen madram atei? | E noi morire abbiamo? | And do we die? |
| An: onat rambui hallen madram atei | Sì, che abbiamo morire. | Yes, we die. |

== See also ==
- Güenoa people
- Charruan languages
- Charrúa people
