= Guenoa =

Uruguayan indigenous people

The Guenoa or Güenoa were one of the Native nations of Entre Rios, Argentina, Uruguay and some parts of Brazil. They were related to the other tribes in the area like Charrua, Minuane, Yaro and Bohán. They are considered synonymous with the Minuan.

== See also ==
- Guenoa language
