= Hurius =

Scientific classification
- Kingdom: Animalia
- Phylum: Arthropoda
- Subphylum: Chelicerata
- Class: Arachnida
- Order: Araneae
- Infraorder: Araneomorphae
- Family: Salticidae
- Subfamily: Salticinae
- Genus: Hurius; Simon, 1901

Type species
- Hurius vulpinus Simon, 1901

Species
- See text.

Diversity
- 4 species

Genus of spiders

Hurius is a genus of the spider family Salticidae (jumping spiders) from South America.

== Species ==
As of February 2017, the World Spider Catalog accepted the following species:

- Hurius aeneus (Mello-Leitão, 1941) – Argentina
- Hurius petrohue Galiano, 1985 – Chile
- Hurius pisac Galiano, 1985 – Peru
- Hurius vulpinus Simon, 1901 – Ecuador
