= Laureano Tacuavé Martínez =

Indian who survived the massacre of Salsipuedes, only to die in France

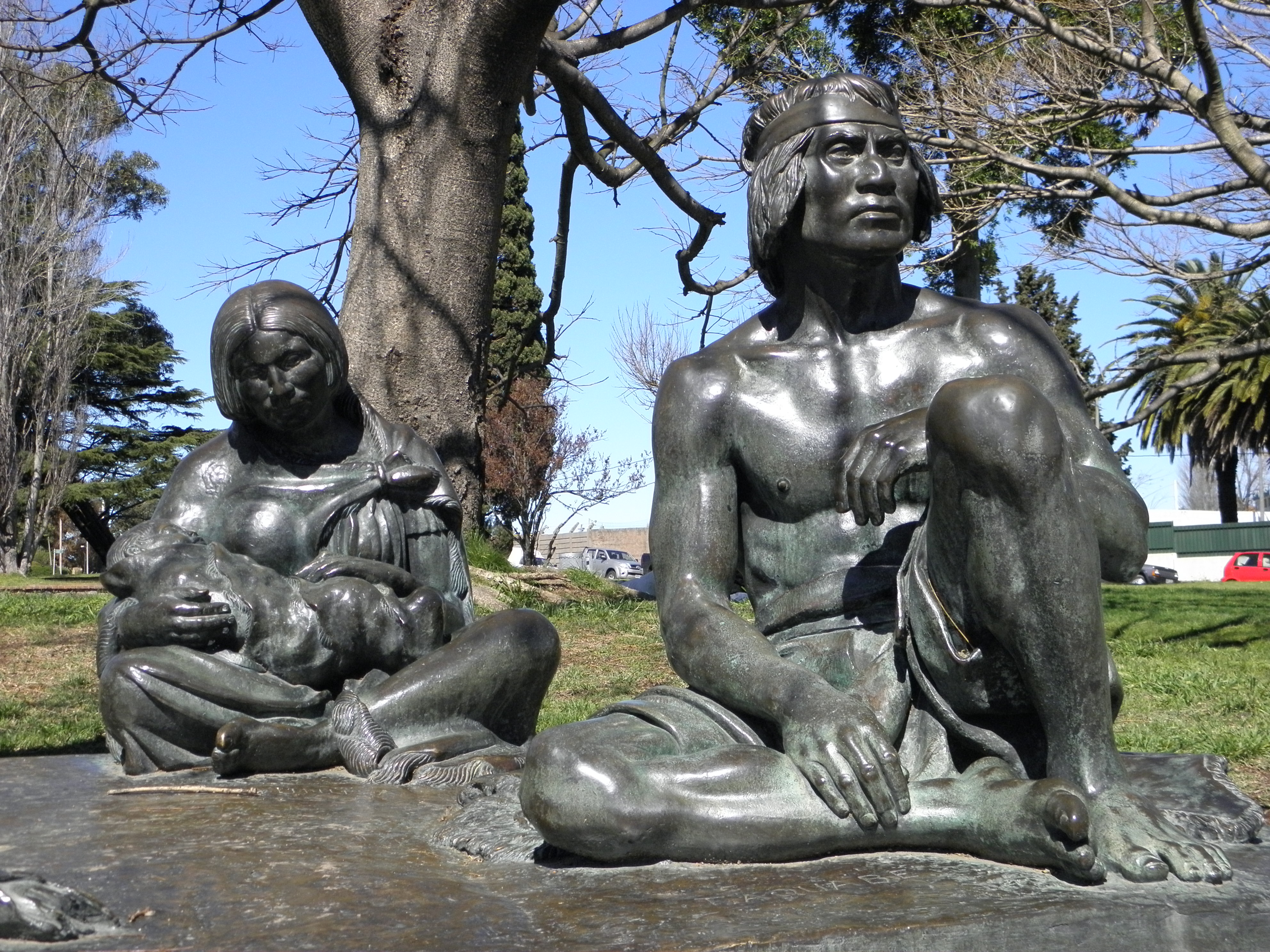
- Tacuavé with Guyunusa and their baby daughter. Part of the sculpture Los últimos charrúas by Edmundo Prati, Gervasio Furest and Enrique Lussich; Parque Prado, Montevideo.
- Born: Laureano Tacuavé Martínez; July 14, 1809; Paysandú, Viceroyalty of the Rio de la Plata
- Died: October 23, 1834 (aged 25); Salins-les-Bains
- Other names: Jean Soulassol; Tacuabé; Vacuabé
- Partner: María Micaela Guyunusa
- Children: María Mó.Mi. Igualdad Libertad/ Caroliné Tacouavé (b. 1833, France) - Adopted
- Parent(s): Francisca Martínez (Mother); Eustaquio Tacuavé (Father)
- Military career
- Rank: Cacique soldier

Laurent Vacouabé (born Laureano Tacuavé Martínez; July 14, 1809, in Paysandú, Viceroyalty of the Rio de la Plata – October 23, 1834, in Salins-les-Bains) was a young Native American from present day Uruguay. Son of Eustaquio Tacuavé and Francisca Martínez, younger brother of María Manuel Tacuavé (12 February 1805) and Apolinaria Tacuavé (23 July 1807). It is uncertain if he was Charrúa of Guaraní and Spaniard descent or if he was Guaraní of Spanish-Charrúan descent.

After the European conquest and colonization, the Charrúa population declined at the hands of local authorities, being practically exterminated in a massacre led by Bernabé Rivera on 11 April 1831.

Four surviving Charrúa were captured at Salsipuedes. These were Tacuabé; his partner María Micaela Guyunusa, daughter of María Rosa, born in 1806; Senaca o Senaqué, a 52- to 57-year-old medicine man and warrior; and Vaimaca-Piru (Perú), a 54-year-old warrior (cacique in charruan) and a general of Artigas. All four were taken to Paris, France by François Curel on November 11, 1833, where they were exhibited to the public as a circus attraction. Tacuabé had also a musical instrument.

Guyunusa and Vaimaca gave birth to a daughter few months after they were taken. Vaimaca, Senaque and Guyunusa died during the first year in France. Eventually they all died in France, including the baby. Tacuabe was baptised by the French as Jean Soulassol. It is also said that he and the child of his late wife, Micaela, escaped. In 2012 documents were found indicating that the child (Caroline Tacouabé) died of tuberculosis just like her mother, and that Laureano adopted the life of a Frenchman and probably died of sickness or old age. A death record in the civil registry of Salins (now Salins-les-Bains, a commune in the Jura department in eastern France, about 150 km (93 mi) from Lyon, where his trace had been lost) states that "Tacuabé", aged 22, born in "Uruguay, Republic of Montevideo (South America)", died there on 23 October 1834. The age stated in the record does not match the 1809 birth date given in other sources, under which he would have been 25. The record had appeared since December 2025 in a footnote on French Wikipedia, added by an editor of that edition, without a transcription or any study. The mention had gone unnoticed: it did not reach the Spanish or English Wikipedias, the press, or Uruguayan historiography, which still treated Tacuabé's fate as unknown. Sebastián Ruiz, a Uruguayan history teacher and researcher who was unaware of that footnote, reached the document independently on 2 October 2026 through a search assisted by artificial intelligence, and was the one who transcribed, translated, analysed and made it public.

In Montevideo, Uruguay there is a monument called The Last Charrúas, (Los Ultimos Charrúas in Spanish), depicting Tacuabé.

They were not the first to set sail to France: a young (said to be about 18 to 20 years old) "cacique" named by a traveling Spanish ship Lieutenant, Navio Louis Marius Barra as Ramón Mataojo, (being that the native was found in "el río Mataojo grande") had traveled to France in January 1832.
