= Charrúa language =

Extinct Charruan language of Uruguay

Charrúa
- Native to: Uruguay
- Ethnicity: Charrúa
- Extinct: after 1964
- Language family: Charruan: Charrúa

Language codes
- ISO 639-3: None (mis)
- Glottolog: char1240
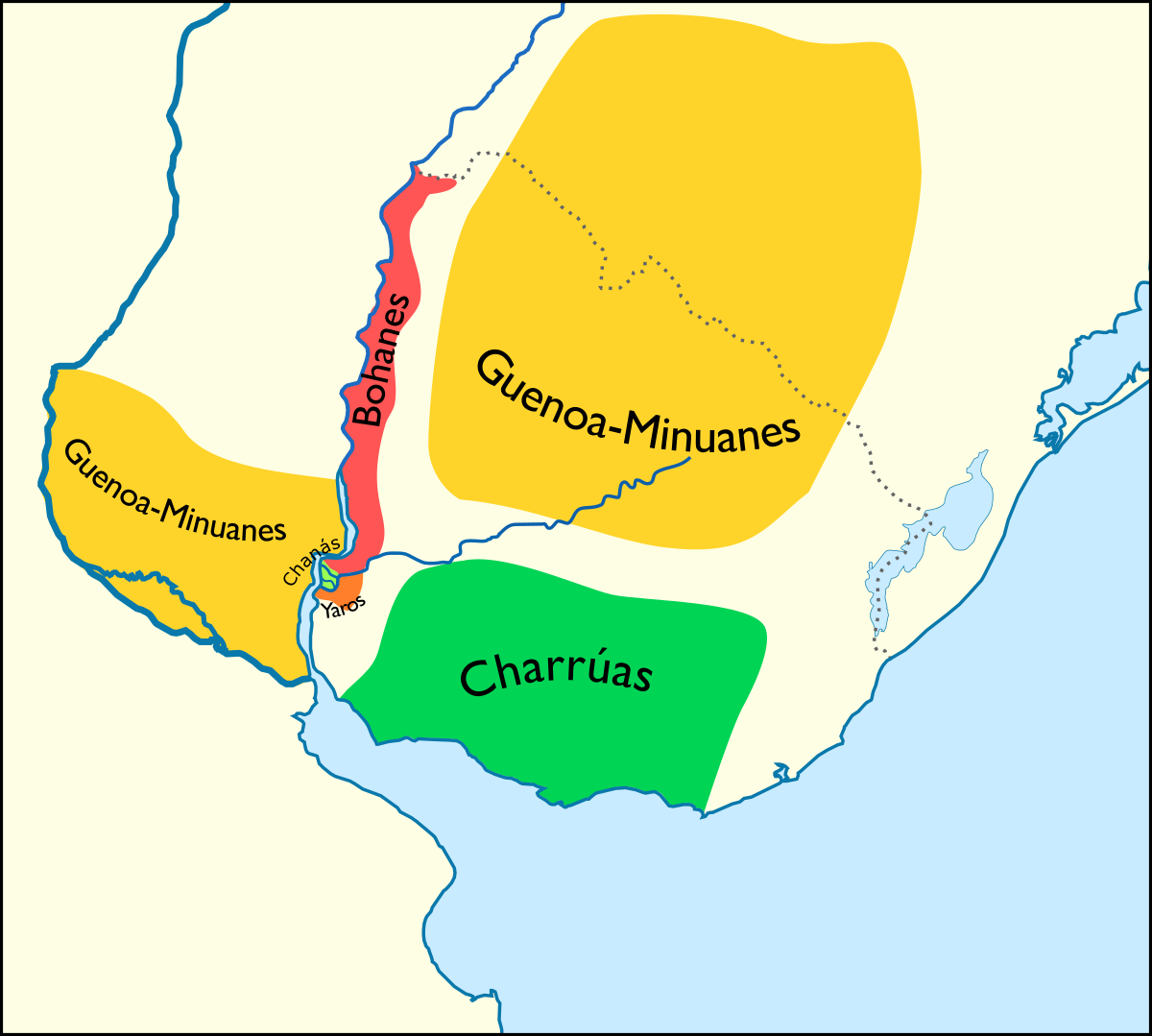
- Charrúa

Charrúa is an extinct Charruan language historically spoken by the Charrúa people in southern Uruguay. The language is poorly attested, known from only a few wordlists, and has been extinct since the 19th century, though speakers were reported as late as 1964.

== Classification ==
Historically, Charrua, and the rest of the Charruan languages, were grouped with various other language families of the region. Daniel Garrison Brinton originally classified Charruan as an independent language family, but later grouped it with the Tupian languages. Both Samuel A. Lafone Quevedo and Rudolph Schuller grouped Charruan with the Guaicuruan languages. Some, including Alcide d'Orbigny, sought to group the languages with Gününa Küne (Puelche), and others with Araucanian (Mapudungun). More recently, Andrey Nikulin has claimed that the three Charruan languages have little similarity with each other, and therefore unrelated to each other, although Lyle Campbell classifies the three languages as "beyond doubt ... belong[ing] to the same language family".

== Geographical distribution ==
The Charrua language was spoken between the Montevideo area and the Uruguay River.

== History ==
Teodoro Vilardebó recorded some vocabulary of Charrua in 1842, fearing that the language would become extinct soon after. These words were republished in 1937. José Pedro Rona and Eugenio Petit Muñoz also recorded some Charrua data in 1964 from a speaker in Villaguay, Argentina, intending to publish their results, although publications have yet to be made. The Charrua people are thought to have also spoken Guarani and Güenoa by the time of Uruguayan independence, as the three groups had been coexisting for some time then.

== Vocabulary ==
=== Numerals ===
Numerals collected by Vilardebó from two informants, the seargent Benito Silva and an Indigenous woman from the ranch of Manuel Arias, are presented below.

Charrua numerals
Number	Silva	Woman of Arias
1	yú	yu
2	sam	sán
3	detí	datít
4	bétum	betúm
5	bétum	betumiú
6	betum sam	-
7	betum detí	-
8	betum artasam	-
9	baquiú	-
10	guaroj	-

The element -arta- in betum artasam '8' is a multiplicative. guaroj '10' is derived from guar 'hand'.
