= Association of Descendants of the Charrúa Nation =

Uruguayan Indigenous descendants organization

- Asociación de Descendientes de la Nación Charrúa
- Abbreviation: ADENCH
- Formation: August 19, 1989; 37 years ago
- Type: Nonprofit, NGO
- Purpose: Charrúa identity
- Region served: Uruguay
- Chairperson: Enrique Auyanet

The Association of Descendants of the Charrúa Nation (Spanish: Asociación de Descendientes de la Nación Charrúa, acronym ADENCH) is a non-profit organization based in Uruguay. They aim to rescue, preserve and disseminate the identity and culture of the descendants of the Indigenous Charrúa people, as well as to contribute to the construction of the national identity and to vindicate Indigenous ancestors.

It is believed that there are approximately between 160,000 and 300,000 individuals in Uruguay, Argentina, and Brazil today who are descendants of surviving Charrúa.

In 2005, ADENCH took part in the formation of the Council of the Charrúa Nation (CONACHA); in 2015 they decided to quit that umbrella organization, citing irreconcilable differences.

There are other similar organizations in Uruguay: Basquadé Inchalá, Grupo Sepé, Guyunusa, Grupo Berá, Grupo Pirí, and Integrador Nacional de Descendientes Indígenas Americanos (INDIA).
