= Yaro people =

Ethnic group native to Uruguay and Argentina

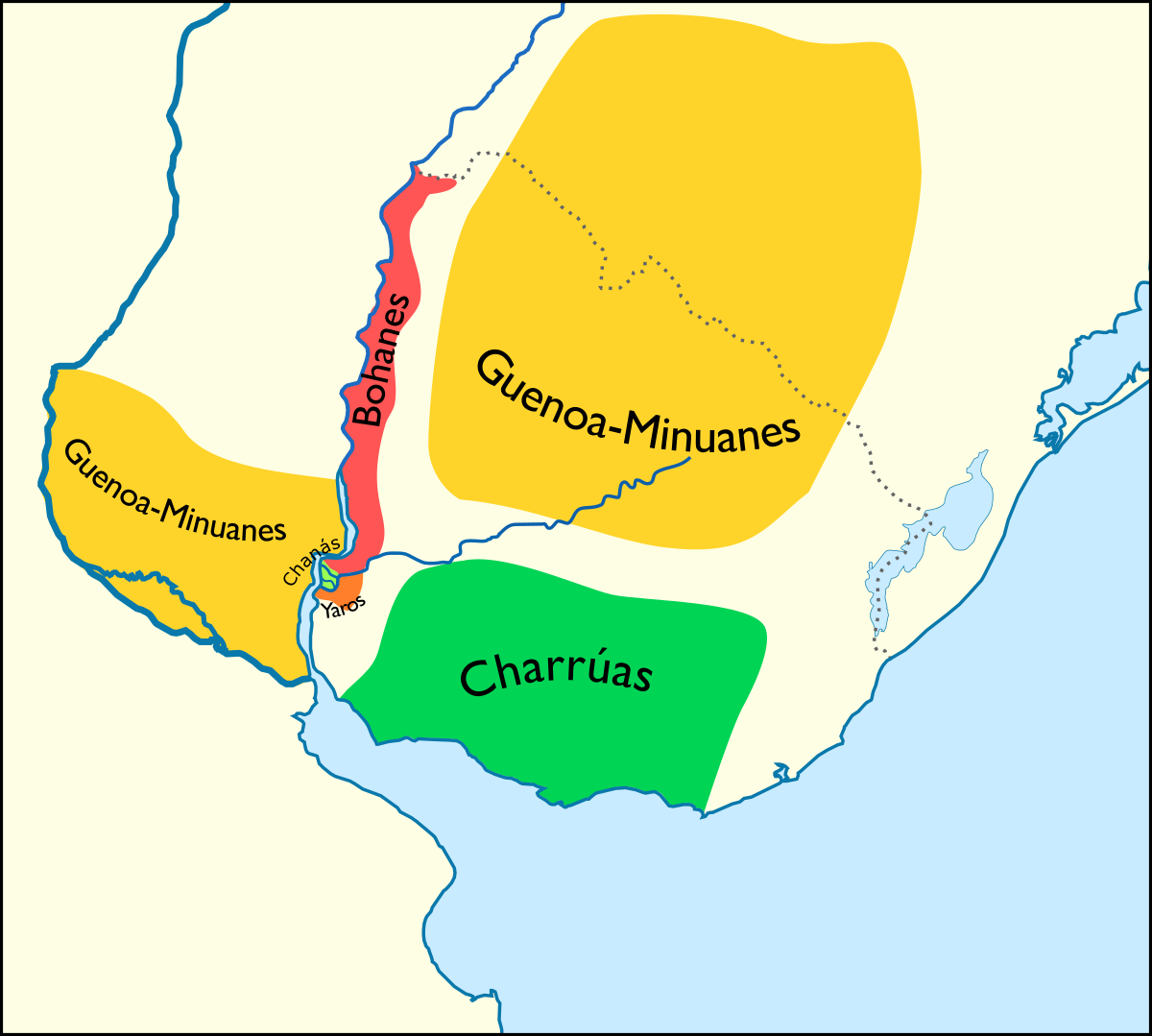
Map of the Charruan-speaking tribes of Uruguay

The Yaro people were an Indigenous people of the Southern Cone of South America who inhabited both banks of the lower Uruguay River (present-day territories of Uruguay and Argentina (Entre Ríos Province)). A minor tribe, they were closely related to the Charrúa people, who they were exterminated and absorbed by between the late 17th and early 18th centuries.

Nowadays a street in Montevideo (Cordón neighbourhood) bears their name.

== History ==
At the time of the arrival of the Spanish, the Yaro people lived on the western bank of the Uruguay River (present-day Entre Ríos Province, Argentina). Later the Charrúa displaced them between the Negro River and the San Salvador (present-day departments of Río Negro and Durazno in Uruguay) and in the lower Uruguay area in Entre Ríos. The Yaros were short in stature with thick legs and arms, which differentiated them from the Patagonian-type (tall) Charrúas. They practiced fishing and hunted deer, peccaries, rheas and cuises, but were mainly devoted to gathering honey, pine nuts, carob pods and seeds of the Misiones pine, from which they made an alcoholic beverage. Their lack of agriculture excludes them from the Guaraní group. They were also unfamiliar with pottery, the bow and the arrow. They did not build dwellings of durable materials, but instead erected windbreaks made from woven plants and placed on the windward side, without roof or walls. Very little is known about the Yaro language. During the period of Spanish domination the Yaros supported the Charrúas' struggle against the Spanish. At the time, the Bohán people dominated the left bank of the Uruguay River from the Negro River to the Cuareim River, especially in the Salto Grande area. Some groups moved to Entre Ríos. According to some scholars, the Bohanes also belonged to the racial nucleus of the Yaros; others claim that they were a subgroup of the Charrúa with whom they merged.

=== Historical testimonies ===
Ruy Díaz de Guzmán in his work Historia Argentina del descubrimiento, población y conquista de las provincias del Río de la Plata ("Argentine History of the Discovery, Settlement and Conquest of the Provinces of the Río de la Plata"), completed in 1612, described how Yaros (whom he called Chayos) and Charrúas killed Captain Juan Álvarez Ramón, sent by Cabot to explore the Uruguay River:

... with this shipwreck Captain Ramón put his men into a boat, and as best he could went ashore with them, and being seen by the Indians of the region called Chayos and Charrúas, they attacked them as they went walking along the coast, since not all could go in the boat; and fighting with them, they killed Captain Ramón and some soldiers, and those who remained returned in the boat to where Cabot was...

The difficulties presented by navigation of the Uruguay River south of the Guaviraví River, the southern limit of the lands occupied by the Guaraníes and the northern limit of those occupied by Charrúas and Yaros, led Jesuit missionaries to found a reduction there to facilitate communications. Thus the reduction of Nuestra Señora de los Reyes de Yapeyú was founded on 4 February 1627 by the Society of Jesus to catechize Guaraní, Charrúa and Yaro groups. In 1657 the estancia-reduction of San Andrés de Yaros was founded a few leagues further down from Yapeyú, the first for Yaros, to which 500 head of cattle were assigned, but it could not be maintained for more than a year because its inhabitants preferred to return to nomadic life. It is not clear whether it was established with captured Yaros, or if they settled at the Ibirapita Guazú stream of their own will.

The Jesuit Diego de Boroa in his Carta Annua ("Annual Letter") corresponding to 1635–1637, dated 13 August 1637, states referring to the Yapeyú reduction:

Of all the reductions of this Province it is perhaps the most difficult, for being so far from the others, and situated among the Yaros and Charrúas, completely barbarous and savage tribes, who, because they live exclusively from fishing and hunting, are almost impossible to reduce.

The French Jesuit Nicolás del Techo in his work Historia de la Provincia del Paraguay ("History of the Province of Paraguay"), published in 1673, stated regarding the Yaros:

The previous year the governor of the Río de la Plata asked the Provincial Pedro Oñate that Fr. Pedro Romero, skilled in dealing with the Indians, should go to Buenos Aires from the Paraná, which lies two hundred leagues away, and sailing along the Uruguay, explore the disposition of those who dwelt near it, and at the same time attempt to reduce the Yaros and found a town at the mouth of the river. One may conjecture the difficulty of such an enterprise considering that, although it is true that the Uruguay is not very far from Buenos Aires, no one had penetrated there. The nations that populated its banks spoke different languages, had diverse customs, and, endowed with a fierce character, refused to deal with foreigners. By their importance the Charrúas and Yaros stood out, most tenacious in preserving their ancient wandering life, without restraint of authority and without devoting themselves to agriculture; such was their barbarity that, when one died, their relatives cut off the phalanx of a finger; thus many were maimed. Before the Spaniards arrived they fed on ostriches, hares and deer, which they hunted, and on fishing. Now that oxen and horses have multiplied so that they populate the fields in numerous herds, they devour their meat half raw; they use slings, and handle them with such skill that they kill a bird in flight and bring down large animals.

The German Jesuit Antonio Sepp, when travelling toward Yapeyú along the Uruguay River in May 1691, noted in his Diario de viaje ("Journey Diary") a description of the Yaros he encountered after passing the Negro River:

The men are almost the size of Europeans, but are shorter and have larger arms and legs. The faces are almost all alike, as if cast in the same mould; they are not elongated but round; not of plastic features like ours but compressed and flat; they are not black like African blacks but dark-brown or ash-grey and horrible to behold. In the hand they always carry a bow and a bundle of arrows. Of all the pagans they are the boldest and strongest, the most warlike and fond of magic. They are called Yaros. They are those who tried to take the life of the holy father Bohm...

Félix de Azara in his Descripción e historia del Paraguay y del Río de la Plata ("Description and History of Paraguay and the Río de la Plata", published in 1847, 26 years after his death) refers to the Yaros and situates them originally between the Negro and the San Salvador Rivers in Uruguay, coinciding with the area where Antonio Sepp had found them:

When the Spaniards discovered the Río de la Plata, the Yaros lived from fishing and hunting on the eastern bank of the Uruguay River between the Negro and San Salvador rivers, venturing little into the open plains and not approaching those traversed by the Charrúas. News of this nation is so scarce that one hardly understands that it had a language different from all others; that it used in war clubs, darts and the arrows [...], and that it was extremely small, barely forming one hundred families. Nevertheless they had the courage to attack and kill some Spaniards with their captain Juan Álvarez and Ramón, first discoverer of the Uruguay River. In the 16th century the Yaros were exterminated by the Charrúas; but these preserved, as wild Indians were accustomed to do, the women and boys who are today mixed and cannot be distinguished.

Azara also said that the Charrúas exterminated the Yaros shortly before 1679:

Shortly before the last cited year, the Charrúas exterminated the two nations called Yaros and Bohanes...

On 6 February 1702 the Charrúas and allies faced 2,000 mission Guaraníes in the Battle of Yi and were defeated, suffering 300 deaths and 500 prisoners, mostly women and children. The Spanish commander stated in this regard:

... to the punishment of the infidel Indians Yaros, Moxanes, Charrúas, and their confederates who received said army that consisted of two thousand Indians well armed with firearms, lances, arrows and stones and other weapons at the place and river called Ibicuí...

The Jesuit Policarpo Dufó in the report to his superior of 9 February 1716 after the punitive campaign that in 1715 Francisco García de Piedrabuena carried out from the Yapeyú reduction to Entre Ríos, stated:

... and that further on, about four leagues away, there were another twenty-five toldos, in a place called Calá, where he had the pasturing of his cows, and that all were of the Mohanes and Yaros subgroup.

=== The "wild Chanas", Cainaroes, and Camaraos ===
Salvador Canals Frau in his work Paleoamericanos (Laguidos) en la Mesopotamia argentina en la época colonial ("Paleo-Americans (Lagids) in the Argentine Mesopotamia in the Colonial Period"), published in 1940, argued on the basis of historical references that the Yaros were a people belonging to the Lagid group of the Kaingangs. In his view the Camaraos (other transcriptions say Camaraes and Camaraus) that appear in the letter of Luis Ramírez to his father dated 10 July 1528 are the Yaros. Luis Ramírez had participated in the expedition of Sebastian Cabot to the Río de la Plata in 1527 and places them between Mocoretaes and Mepenes, in what is now the interior of Corrientes Province, Argentina:

... On the Paraná River, from Sancti Spiritus as far as the said Santana, there are the following peoples: the Mecoretai, the Camaraos, and the Mepeus; and entering the said mouth of the Paraguay, as far as we travelled along it, there are those I shall name: the Yngatus, the Beoyos, and the Conameguaes...

Canals Frau considered that the Cainaroes that appear on the world map of Sebastian Cabot, dated 1544 but recording the data of his expedition on the Paraná River in 1527, in the interior and east of Corrientes Province, are the Camaraos of Luis Ramírez.

Observing the similarities of location between the Camaraos and Cainaroes with the Zeckennaus saluaischco (translated as wild Chanás) that the German soldier of the expedition of the adelantado Pedro de Mendoza, Ulrich Schmidl, described that they encountered on the journey to Paraguay in 1536 in his work Viaje al Río de la Plata ("Journey to the Río de la Plata", published in 1567), Canals Frau inferred that they are one and the same:

From there we sailed up the Paranaw and after four days of travel we reached a nation called Zeckennaus Saluaischco, short and stout people, who have nothing to eat except fish and honey. These people, both men and women, young and old, go naked, just as they were cast into the world, so that they wear not a rag nor anything to cover their shame; they are at war with the Machueradeiss; and their meat is that of deer, wild pigs, ostriches and rabbits, which resemble mice but without the tail.
This nation is 18 miles from the Mahueradeis. This journey we made in four days. We stayed only one night with them, because they did not even have food for themselves; it is a nation that resembles the highway robbers of our country. They live about 20 miles from the water, to avoid being taken by surprise by their enemies. But on this occasion they had come down to the water five days before our arrival to supply themselves with fish and to fight with the Macharades; they number some 2,000 strong men.

Canals Frau observed that Schmidl's description corresponds to the Kaingang type and to the historical references to the Yaros.

The Historia general y natural de las Indias, islas y tierra firme del mar océano ("General and Natural History of the Indies, Islands and Mainland of the Ocean Sea") was published by Gonzalo Fernández de Oviedo in parts between 1535 and 1557 with an account of the wild Chanás:

Further along the northern coast and beside the Río Grande is another nation called Wild Chanaes: these have great abundance of carob pods which they eat, and their speech is very throaty, so that it seems they shout when they call one another. They have throwing sticks and arrows: they do not sow, and are hunters, and from this hunting and their carobs they sustain themselves.

In later chronicles the wild Chanás, the Cainaroes, and the Camaraos do not appear, but Canals Frau observed that mentions of the Gualachíes began to appear to the north and the Yaroes to the south on the Mesopotamian bank of the Uruguay River. In his opinion, the Gualachíes displaced the Cainaroes southward, and the Cainaroes began to be called Yaroes. The Gualachíes who inhabited the Argentine provinces of Corrientes and Misiones before the arrival of the Guaraníes seem to be of the same group as the Yaros and correspond to the Guayanás or Kaingang whom at the end of the 18th century Diego de Alvear and Gonzalo de Doblas mention on both banks of the Paraná south of the Iguazú River. Other ethnic groups of the interior of Corrientes mentioned by historical sources of the 18th century, such as the Guayquirarós, the Cupizalós, and the Eguarós, would also be of the Kaingang family.
