= Council of the Charrúa Nation =

Uruguayan native people organization

- Consejo de la Nación Charrúa
- Abbreviation: CONACHA
- Formation: June 25, 2005; 21 years ago
- Type: Nonprofit, NGO
- Purpose: Charrúa identity
- Location(s): Calera de las Huérfanas 4728, Montevideo

The Council of the Charrúa Nation (Spanish: Consejo de la Nación Charrúa, acronym CONACHA) is a non-profit organization based in Uruguay. It is an umbrella organization, conceived to rescue, preserve and disseminate the identity and culture of the descendants of the Indigenous Charrúa people, as well as to contribute to the construction of the national identity and to vindicate Indigenous ancestors. It comprises several groups, among others: Basquadé Inchalá, Grupo Sepé, Guyunusa, Grupo Berá, Grupo Pirí. Another organization, the Association of Descendants of the Charrúa Nation, was among the founding members, but they quit in 2015, citing irreconcilable differences.

It is believed that there are approximately between 160,000 and 300,000 individuals in Uruguay, Argentina, and Brazil today who are descendants of surviving Charrúa.
