= Bohán =

Indigenous people of Uruguay

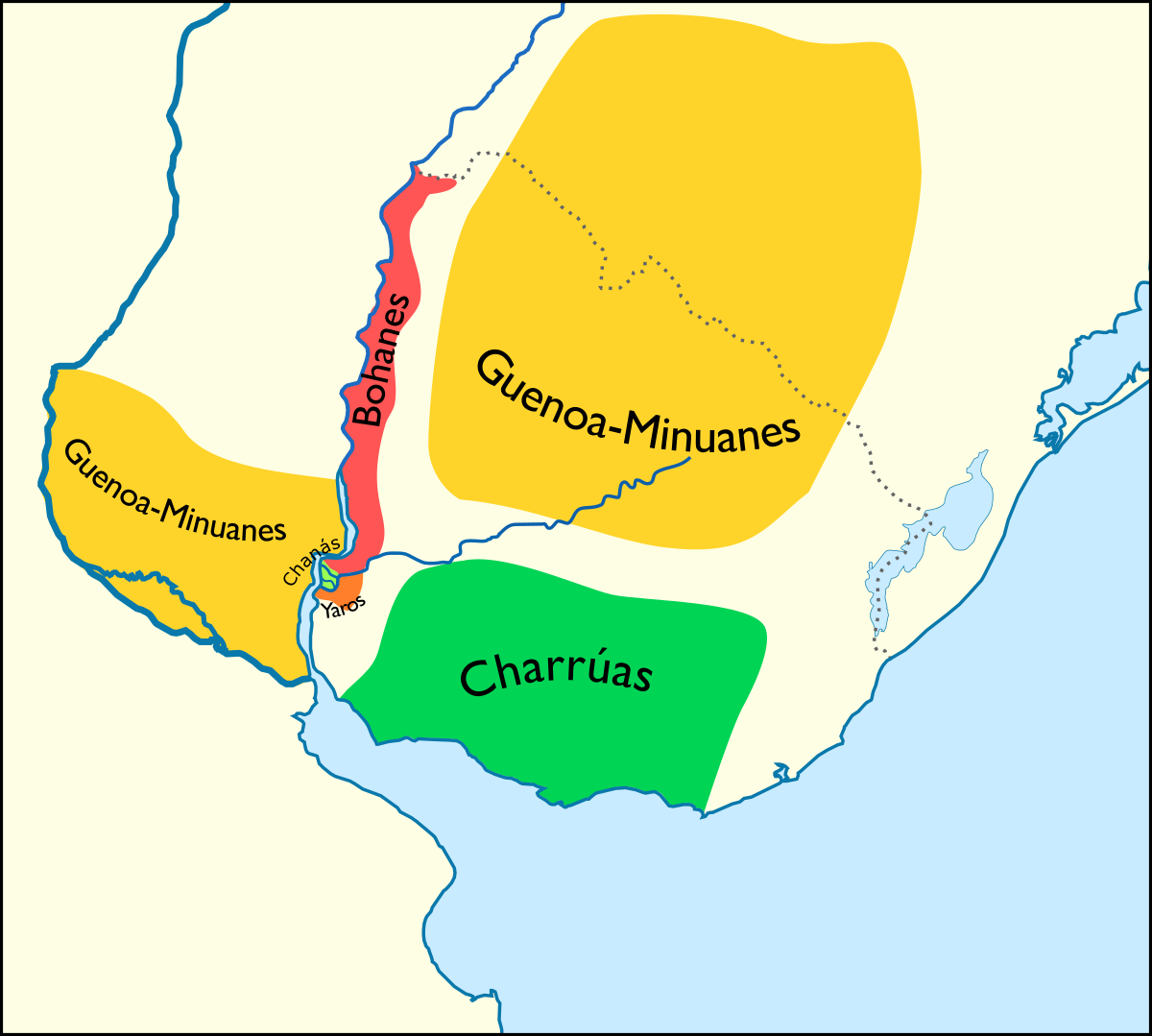
Map of Charruan-speaking peoples around Uruguay

The Bohán were one of the Native nations of Uruguay. A minor tribe, they were related to and eventually subsumed by the Charrúa people. They were also related to the Yaro people.

The Bohanes lived on the banks of the Uruguay River from the Río Negro to the Quaraí River in what is modern-day Uruguay, near the modern border with Brazil. They were especially concentrated in the place of the modern reservoir of the Salto Grande Dam (which was not flooded at the time). According to some scholars, the tribe originated from the Entre Ríos Province in modern-day Argentina, and some of its members were active there regardless.

Before the arrival of the Charrúas, the Bohán used as weapons the sling, the spear, and the dart. After its merger with the Charruas, they also began use of the bow and the bola.

In 1715, a force of 1500 Spanish-allied Guaraní from the Yapeyú Jesuit reduction conducted a notable punitive reprisal raid on the Bohán, along with the Yaros and Charrúa. It was led by maestre de campo Francisco García Piedrabuena. They reached as far as the arroyo Ñancay. Written accounts of the expedition constitute some of the rare written materials on the Bohán and their lifestyle written at the time.
