= Charrúa =

Amerindian ethnic group native to Uruguay

- Flag of the Charrúa people

Regions with significant populations
- Uruguay 159,319 (2011); Argentina 14,649 (2010); Brazil 42 (2014)

Languages
- Spanish formerly Charrúa

Religion
- Catholicism, Animism

Related ethnic groups
- Chaná, Guaraní, Bohán, Yaro people, Guenoa–Minuane

The Charrúa are an Indigenous people or Indigenous Nation of the Southern Cone in present-day Uruguay and the adjacent areas in Argentina (Entre Ríos) and Brazil (Rio Grande do Sul). They were a semi-nomadic people who sustained themselves mainly through hunting and gathering. Since resources were not permanent in every region, they would constantly be on the move. Rain, drought, and other environmental factors determined their movement. For this reason they are often classified as seasonal nomads.

A large number of Charrúa people were massacred in a campaign in 1831 by the Uruguayan Army known as the Massacre of Salsipuedes. Though largely erased from modern histories, some communities of the Charrúa survived outside of Uruguay in Argentina and Brazil. It is believed that there are approximately between 160,000 and 300,000 individuals in Uruguay, Argentina, and Brazil today who are descendants of surviving Charrúa. Contemporary descendants of the Charrúa have created organizations and advocate for the memory of the Indigenous people.

== History ==
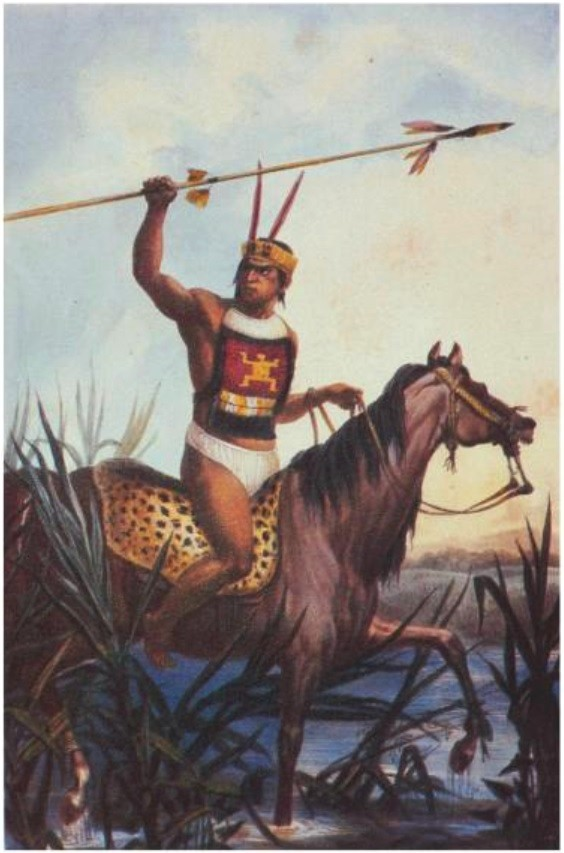
A Charrúa warrior.

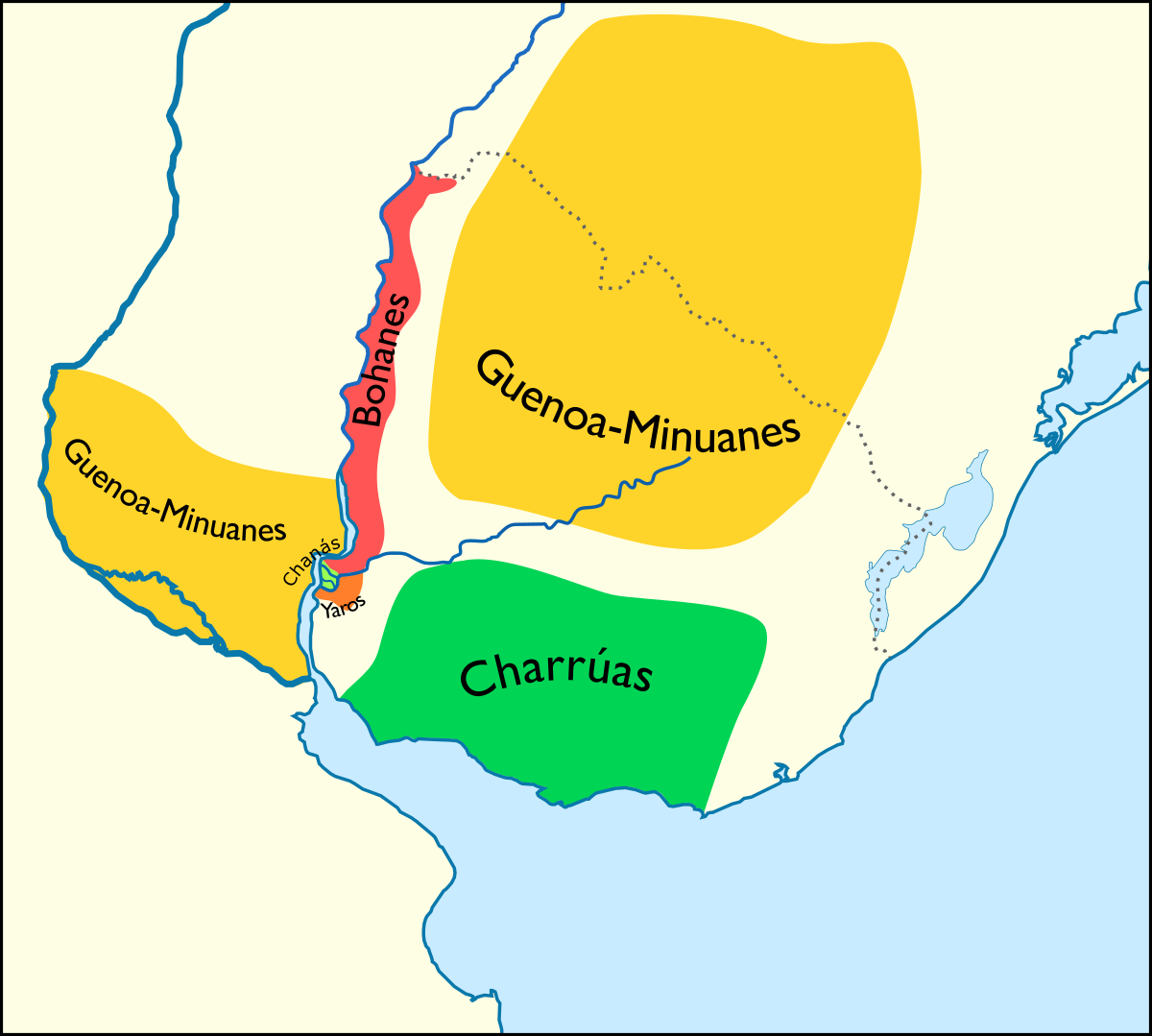
Charrua distribution

The life of the Charrúas before contact with the Spanish Colonists remains to a large extent a mystery since most knowledge about the Charrúas comes from Spanish contact with them.

Chroniclers such as the Jesuit Pedro Lozano accused the Charrúan people of killing the Spanish explorer Juan Díaz de Solís during his 1515 voyage up the Río de la Plata. This was a crucial moment since it shows that the Charrúas were prepared to resist the Spanish invaders. Following the arrival of European settlers, the Charrúa, along with the Chaná, strongly resisted the territorial invasion. In the 18th and 19th centuries the Charrúa were confronted by cattle exploitation that strongly altered their way of life, causing famine and forcing them to rely on cows and sheep. However, these were in that epoch increasingly privatized. Malones (raids) were resisted by settlers who freely shot any Indigenous people who were in their way. Charrúas would move to the shore in summer to fish and gather clams, fruits, and roots and moved inland in winter to hunt deer, rheas, and smaller game with bolas (stones connected by short ropes that are thrown to ensnare prey) and bows and arrows.

== Genocide ==
The drastic demographic reduction of the Charrúas did not occur until the administration of the first president of Uruguay, Fructuoso Rivera. Although Rivera initially maintained a good relationship with the Charrúas, the increasing dominance of the white people and desires for expansion led to hostilities. He therefore organized a genocide campaign known as La Campaña de Salsipuedes in 1831. This campaign was composed of three different attacks in three different places: "El Paso del Sauce del Queguay", "El Salsipuedes", and a passage known as "La Cueva del Tigre". Legend has it that the first attack was a betrayal. Rivera knew the tribal leaders and called them to his barracks by the river, later named "Salsipuedes". He claimed that he needed their help to defend territory and that they should join him, however, once the Charrúas were drunk and off their guard, the Uruguayan soldiers attacked them. The following two attacks were carried out to eliminate the Charrúas that had escaped or had not been present. It is said that since 11 April 1831, when the Salsipuedes (meaning "Get-out-if-you-can") campaign was launched by a group led by Bernabé Rivera, nephew of Fructuoso Rivera, the Charrúas were then officially claimed to be extinct.

Four surviving Charrúas were captured at Salsipuedes. The directory of the Oriental School of Montevideo thought a nearly extinct race would spark the interest of French scientists and the public. They were Senacua Sénaqué, a medicine man; Vaimaca-Pirú Sira, a warrior; and a young couple, Laureano Tacuavé Martínez and María Micaëla Guyunusa. All four were taken to Paris in 1833, where they were exhibited to the public. The display was not a success and they all soon died in France, including a baby daughter born to Sira and Guyunusa, and adopted by Tacuavé. The child was named María Mónica Micaëla Igualdad Libertad by the Charrúa, yet she was filed by the French as Caroliné Tacouavé. A monumental sculpture, Los Últimos Charrúas was built in their memory in Montevideo, Uruguay.

After Salsipuedes, the Charrúa were gradually dispossessed of their sovereignty while the new state was affirming its jurisdiction over the whole territory. According to the Argentine census of 2001, there were 676 Charrúas living in the province of Entre Ríos, Argentina.

== Legacy ==
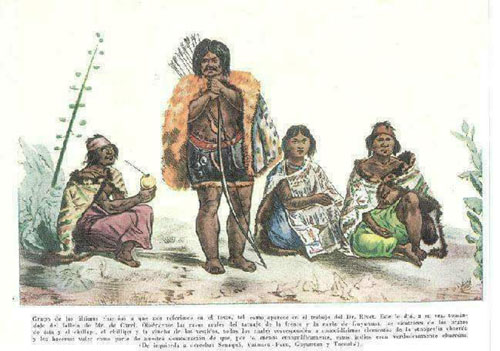
Charrúa people in 1833.

Following the end of Uruguay's last dictatorship in 1985, a group of people has been affirming and vindicating their Charrúan ancestry.

In August 1989, the Association of Descendants of the Charrúa Nation (ADENCH, Asociación de Descendientes de la Nación Charrúa) was created to rescue, conserve, and promulgate the knowledge and presence of Indigenous peoples in Uruguay. In 2005, another organisation was formed, the Council of the Charrúa Nation (CONACHA, Consejo de la Nación Charrúa) – where families came out of clandestinity and publicly self-recognized themselves as Charrúa.

Not much is known about the Charrúa due to their cognitive erasure at an early time in Uruguayan history. The only surviving documents that concern the Charrúa are those of Spanish explorers, archaeologists, and anthropologists. A new body of literature is currently emerging about their oral history, contemporary ethnogenesis and activism.

It is believed that there are approximately between 160,000 and 300,000 individuals in Uruguay, Argentina, and Brazil today who are descendants of surviving Charrúa.

On November 9, 2007, the Câmara dos Vereadores of Porto Alegre held a Solemn Act to recognize the Charruas as an existing native Brazilian people. The event was jointly organized by the Human Rights Commission of the Câmara dos Vereadores of Porto Alegre and the Human Rights Commission of the National Congress of Brazil. During the Act, Senators Paulo Paim and Sérgio Zambiasi congratulated the Indigenous people for their "conquest and effort in a struggle that has lasted 172 years". The life of cacica-geral Acuab, the most notable Charrua chief of Rio Grande do Sul and the first female cacique of the Charruas, was the subject of the documentary Perambulantes (Brazil, 2009), by Giancarla Brunnetto e Karine Emerich. Acuab, cacique of Aldeia Polidoro, is credited with going to Brasilia and handing over to then-President Lula a document that asked for the recognition of her people by Fundação National do Índio. Acuab reached the President after evading his security detail. This recognition would come in September, 2007. By 2008 the city of Porto Alegre would grant Aldeia Polidoro (a 9-ha area) the status of municipal Indigenous territory.

Uruguayans refer to themselves as "charrúa" when in the context of a competition or battle against a foreign contingent. In situations in which Uruguayans display bravery in the face of overwhelming odds, the expression "garra charrúa" (charrúan tenacity) is used to refer to victory in the face of certain defeat.

=== Other uses ===
- There is a Charrúa cemetery located in Piriápolis in the Maldonado Department.
- The Uruguay national football team is nicknamed "Los Charrúas" and a local rugby team in Porto Alegre is also named after the nation.
- Charrua, is a municipality in the Brazilian state of Rio Grande do Sul.
- "Charrua" is also the name of a Brazilian military tank used for troop transportation.
- Tabaré was published in 1888; it is an epic poem by Juan Zorrilla de San Martín about a Charrúa and his love for a Spanish woman.
- The rivuline Austrolebias charrua was named after them.
- A street in Montevideo in the neighbourhoods of Pocitos and Cordón is named "Charrúa".
- The 2nd Mechanized Cavalry Brigade from the Brazilian Army is named "Brigada Charrua" (Charrua Brigade).

== See also ==
- Indigenous peoples in Uruguay
- Minuane people
- Association of Descendants of the Charrúa Nation
- Council of the Charrúa Nation
