= Chavez Ravine Arboretum =

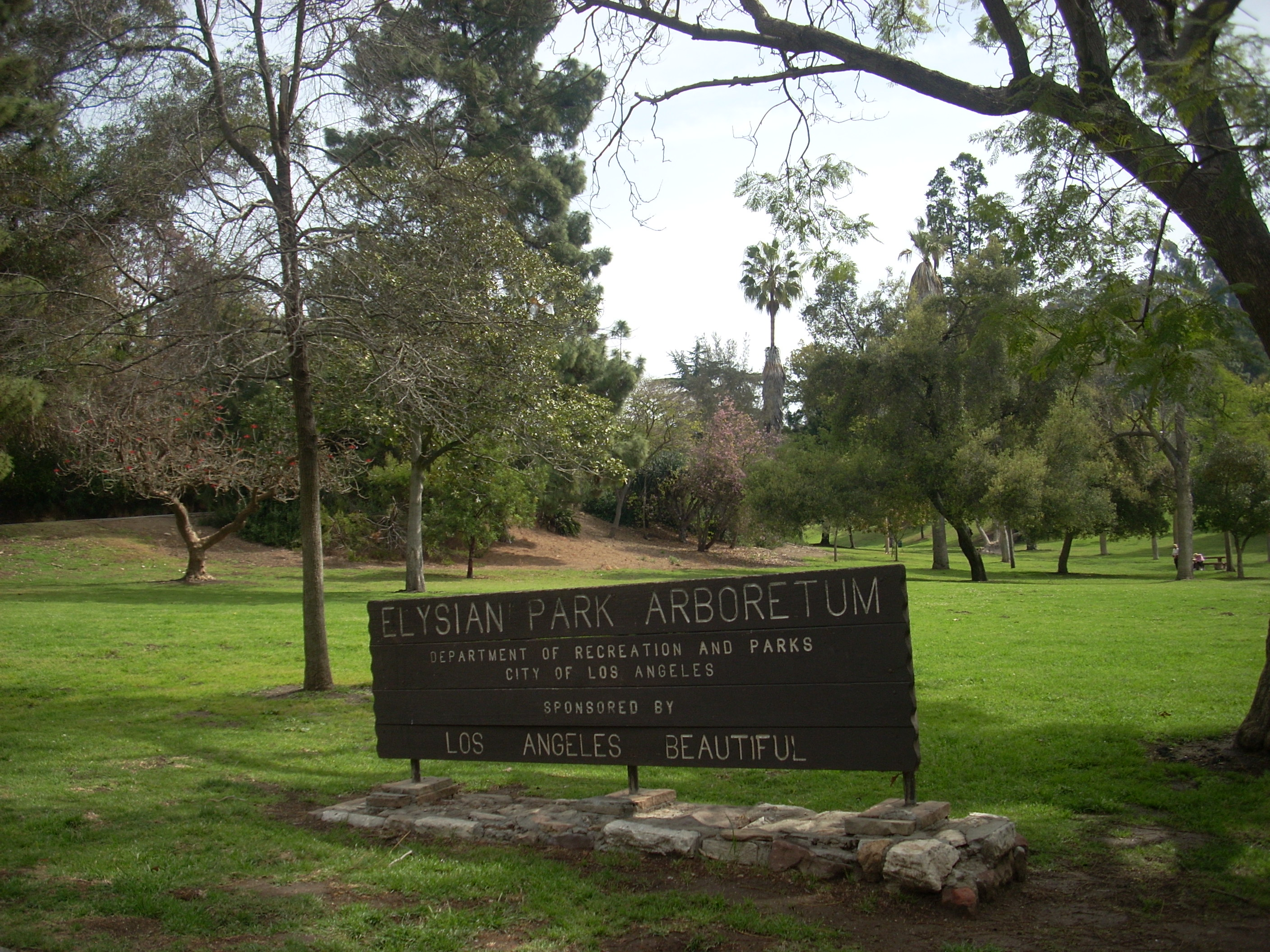
- Chavez Ravine Arboretum

- Location within the Los Angeles metropolitan area
- 34.083°N 118.238°W
- Location: 929 Academy Road, Los Angeles

Site notes
- Website: www.laparks.org/horticulture/chavez-ravine-arboretum

Los Angeles Historic-Cultural Monument
- Designated: April 26, 1967
- Reference no.: 48

The Chavez Ravine Arboretum, in Elysian Park, just north of Dodger Stadium, at 1025 Elysian Park Dr, Los Angeles, California, contains more than 100 varieties of trees from around the world, including what are believed to be the oldest and largest Cape chestnut, Kauri, and Tipu trees in the United States. Admission to the arboretum is free.

The Arboretum was founded in 1893 by the Los Angeles Horticultural Society, and planting of rare trees continued through the 1920s. Most of the original trees are still standing. The Arboretum was declared a Los Angeles Historic-Cultural Monument in 1967.

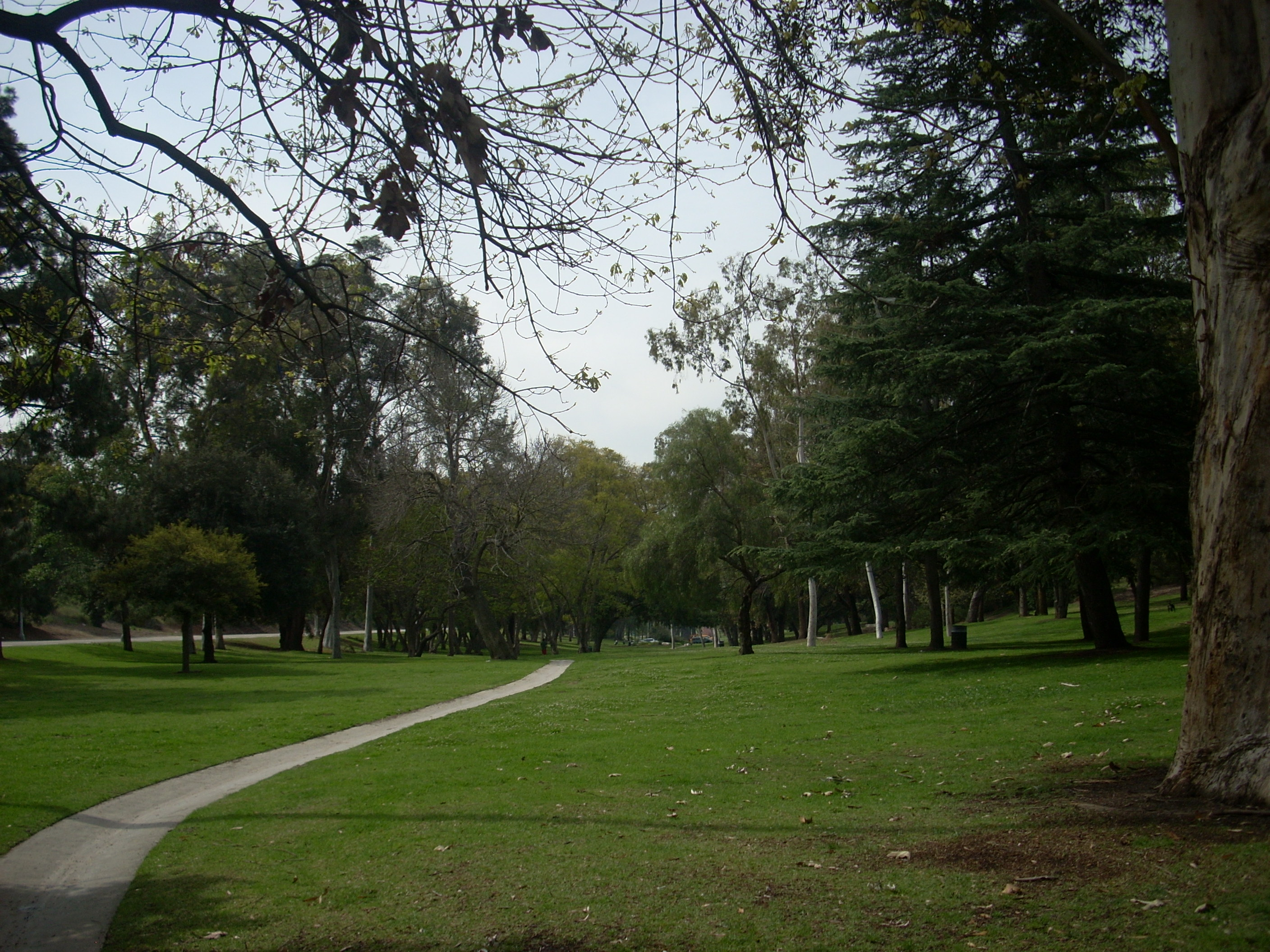
View of the trees

Trees in the Arboretum include:

- Acacia dealbata
- Acer (maple)
  - Acer campestre (field maple)
  - Acer negundo (box elder)
  - Acer paxii
  - Acer saccharinum (silver maple)
- Aesculus x carnea
- Afrocarpus gracilior
- Agathis robusta
- Alnus rhombifolia (white alder)
- Angophora costata (rose apple)
- Araucaria bidwillii (bunya pine)
- Archontophoenix cunninghamiana (king palm)
- Baphia chrysophylla
- Bauhinia
  - Bauhinia forficata (Brazilian orchid tree)
  - Bauhinia variegata (orchid tree)
- Betula nigra (black birch)
- Brachychiton (bottletree)
  - Brachychiton acerifolius (Illiwarra flame tree)
  - Brachychiton acerifolius (Herman hybrid)
  - Brachychiton discolor
  - Brachychiton populneus (Kurrajong)
- Brahea (Hesper palm)
  - Brahea armata (Mexican blue palm)
  - Brahea brandegeei
  - Brahea edulis (Guadalupe palm)
- Butia capitata (jelly palm)
- Calocedrus decurrens (California incense cedar)
- Calodendrum capense (Cape chestnut)
- Caryota urens
- Castanospermum australe
- Casuarina cunninghamiana
- Cedrus (cedar)
  - Cedrus deodara
  - Cedrus libani
- Ceiba
  - Ceiba insignis
  - Ceiba speciosa (silk floss tree)
- Celtis australis
- Chamaerops humilis
- Chionanthus retusus
- Cryptocarya rubra
- Cryptomeria japonica
- Cupaniopsis anacardioides
- Cupressus
  - Cupressus glabra
  - Cupressus species
- Dalbergia sissoo
- Dracaena draco (Canary Islands dragon tree)
- Ehretia
  - Ehretia anacua (sandpaper tree)
  - Ehretia tinifolia
- Eriobotrya
  - Eriobotrya deflexa
  - Eriobotrya japonica (loquat)
- Erythrina (coral tree)
  - Erythrina coralloides (naked coral tree)
  - Erythrina falcata (Brazilian coral tree)
  - Erythrina humeana (dwarf kaffirboom)
- Eucalyptus
  - Eucalyptus camaldulensis (river red gum)
  - Eucalyptus citriodora
  - Eucalyptus cladocalyx (sugar gum)
  - Eucalyptus globulus
  - Eucalyptus robusta (swamp mahogany)
  - Eucalyptus rudis (flooded gum)
  - Eucalyptus viminalis (manna gum)
- Ficus (fig tree)
  - Ficus microcarpa
  - Ficus racemosa
  - Ficus religiosa (sacred fig)
  - Ficus species
- Fraxinus (ash)
  - Fraxinus uhdei
  - Fraxinus velutina
- Handroanthus impetiginosus (pink lapacho)
- Heteromeles arbutifolia (toyon)
- Jacaranda acutifolia
- Jubaea chilensis (Chilean wine palm)
- Juglans nigra (eastern black walnut)
- Lagerstroemia indica (crepe myrtle)
- Liquidambar formosana (Chinese sweet gum)
- Liriodendron tulipifera
- Livistona
  - Livistona australis (cabbage-tree palm)
  - Livistona chinensis (Chinese fan palm)
- Macadamia ternifolia
- Magnolia grandiflora
- Metasequoia glyptostroboides (dawn redwood)
- Metrosideros excelsa (pohutukawa)
- Nyssa sylvatica (black tupelo)
- Phoenix
  - Phoenix canariensis (Canary Island date palm)
  - Phoenix dactylifera (date palm)
  - Phoenix reclinata
  - Phoenix reclinata (hybrid)
  - Phoenix roebelenii x rupicola
  - Phoenix rupicola (cliff date palm)
- Phytolacca dioica (ombú)
- Pinus (pine)
  - Pinus canariensis (Canary Island pine)
  - Pinus edulis (Colorado pinyon)
  - Pinus halepensis (aleppo pine)
  - Pinus thunbergii (Japanese black pine)
- Pittosporum (cheesewood)
  - Pittosporum phillyreoides
  - Pittosporum tenuifolium (black matipo)
  - Pittosporum undulatum
- Plinia cauliflora (jabuticaba)
- Podocarpus totara
- Psidium guajava (apple guava)
- Quercus (oak)
  - Quercus agrifolia (coast live oak)
  - Quercus alba (white oak)
  - Quercus cerris (turkey oak)
  - Quercus coccinea (scarlet oak)
  - Quercus macrocarpa (bur oak)
  - Quercus palustris (pin oak)
  - Quercus rubra (northern red oak)
  - Quercus suber (cork oak)
  - Quercus virginiana (southern live oak)
- Rhapidophyllym hystrix (needle palm)
- Rhapis excelsa (broadleaf lady palm)
- Rhodosphaera rhodanthema
- Rhopalostylis baueri
- Rhus integrifolia
- Sabal
  - Sabal causiarum (Puerto Rican hat palm)
  - Sabal species
- Salix babylonica (weeping willow)
- Schinus (pepper tree)
  - Schinus molle (Peruvian pepper)
  - Schinus polygamus (Cabrera Hardee peppertree)
- Sequoiadendron giganteum
- Syagrus romanzoffiana (queen palm)
- Taxodium distichum
- Tipuana tipu
- Toona ciliata
- Trachycarpus
  - Trachycarpus fortunei (windmill palm)
  - Trachycarpus wagnerianus
- Tristaniopsis laurina (water gum)
- Trithrinax acanthocoma
- Ulmus americana (American elm)
- Umbellularia californica (California bay laurel)
- Washingtonia
  - Washingtonia filifera (California fan palm)
  - Washingtonia filifera var. robusta (Mexican fan palm)
- Zelkova serrata (Japanese zelkova)

== See also ==
- List of botanical gardens in the United States
