= Jorge Chebataroff =

Uruguayan professor, botanist, geographer, and biologist

Jorge Chebataroff Cazachenko (Russian Empire, 8 March 1909 - Montevideo, 18 March 1984) was a Russian-born Uruguayan professor, botanist and agrostologist.

Among other contributions in the field of archaeology, he discovered the Hombre del Catalanense, alongside Antonio Taddei.

He was also an avid explorer of topographic features. Sierras de Mahoma, Barrancas de San Mauricio, Cerros del Penitente, Cerro de las Ánimas, Cerro Arequita, Villa Serrana, Arroyo Catalán Chico, Pajas Blancas, etc., were his favorite open-air classrooms and on-site labs.

== Honors ==
- (Anacardiaceae) Schinus chebataroffii Herter
- (Asteraceae) Noticastrum chebataroffii (Herter) Zardini
