= Noticastrum chebataroffii =

Scientific classification
- Kingdom: Plantae
- Clade: Tracheophytes
- Clade: Angiosperms
- Clade: Eudicots
- Clade: Asterids
- Order: Asterales
- Family: Asteraceae
- Genus: Noticastrum
- Species: N. chebataroffii

Binomial name
- Noticastrum chebataroffii (Herter) Zardini

Flowering plant

Noticastrum chebataroffii is a South American flowering plant in the family Asteraceae.

It was named honoring Russian-Uruguayan botanist and geographer Jorge Chebataroff.
