= Schinus venturi =

Conservation status
- Vulnerable (IUCN 2.3)

Scientific classification
- Kingdom: Plantae
- Clade: Tracheophytes
- Clade: Angiosperms
- Clade: Eudicots
- Clade: Rosids
- Order: Sapindales
- Family: Anacardiaceae
- Genus: Schinus
- Species: S. venturi

Binomial name
- Schinus venturi Barkley

Species of flowering plant

Schinus venturi is a species of plant in the family Anacardiaceae. It is found in Argentina and Bolivia. It is threatened by habitat loss.
