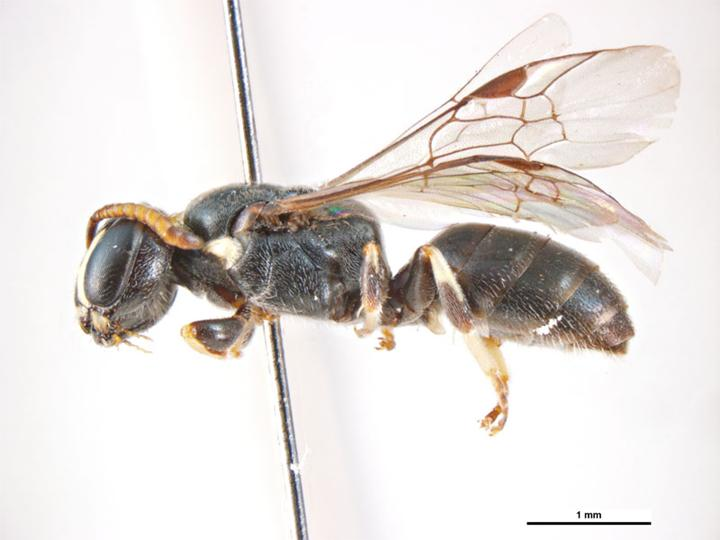
- Female

Scientific classification
- Kingdom: Animalia
- Phylum: Arthropoda
- Clade: Pancrustacea
- Class: Insecta
- Order: Hymenoptera
- Family: Colletidae
- Genus: Hylaeus
- Species: H. aralis

Binomial name
- Hylaeus aralis (Cockerell, 1916)

Synonyms
- Prosopis aralis Cockerell, 1916

= Hylaeus aralis =

Species of bee

Hylaeus aralis, or Hylaeus (Prosopisteron) aralis, is a species of bee in the family Colletidae and subfamily Hylaeinae. It is endemic to Australia. It was described by British-American entomologist Theodore Dru Alison Cockerell in 1916.

== Description ==
Integumental colouration is mainly black, with cream to white markings.

== Distribution and habitat ==
The species occurs in south-eastern Australia. The type locality is Mount Yule, near Healesville in Victoria.

== Behaviour ==
The adults are solitary flying mellivores with sedentary larvae. They nest in galleries in dead eucalypts. Flowering plants visited by the bees include Corymbia calophylla, as well as Leptospermum and Schinus species.

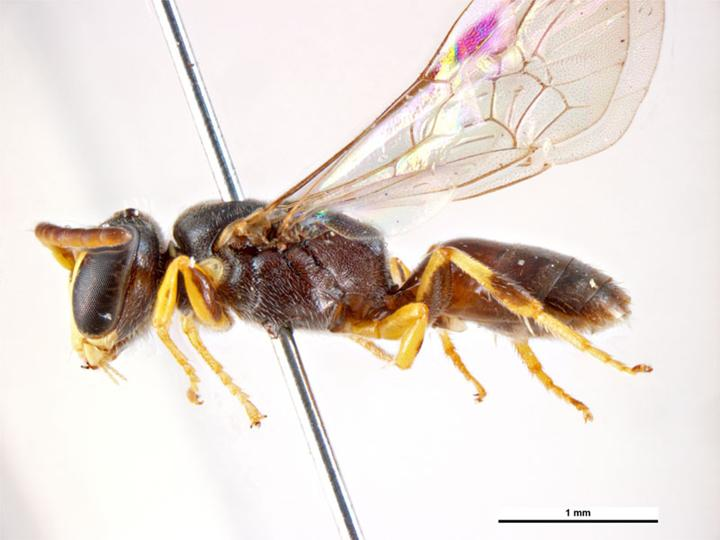
Male
