= Hombre del Catalanense =

Prehistoric culture found in Uruguay

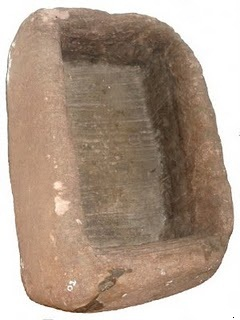
Stone tool belonging to the Catalanense man

The Catalanense industry (also known as Catalanense man) is the denomination of a prehistoric culture living in nowadays Uruguay, which developed 8,000 to 10,000 years before the Charrúa.

It was discovered by Antonio Taddei and Jorge Chebataroff in Artigas Department, near Catalán Chico creek. An area of 27 square kilometres (10 sq mi) includes 18 main sites. It was first shown in the International Congress of Americanists.
