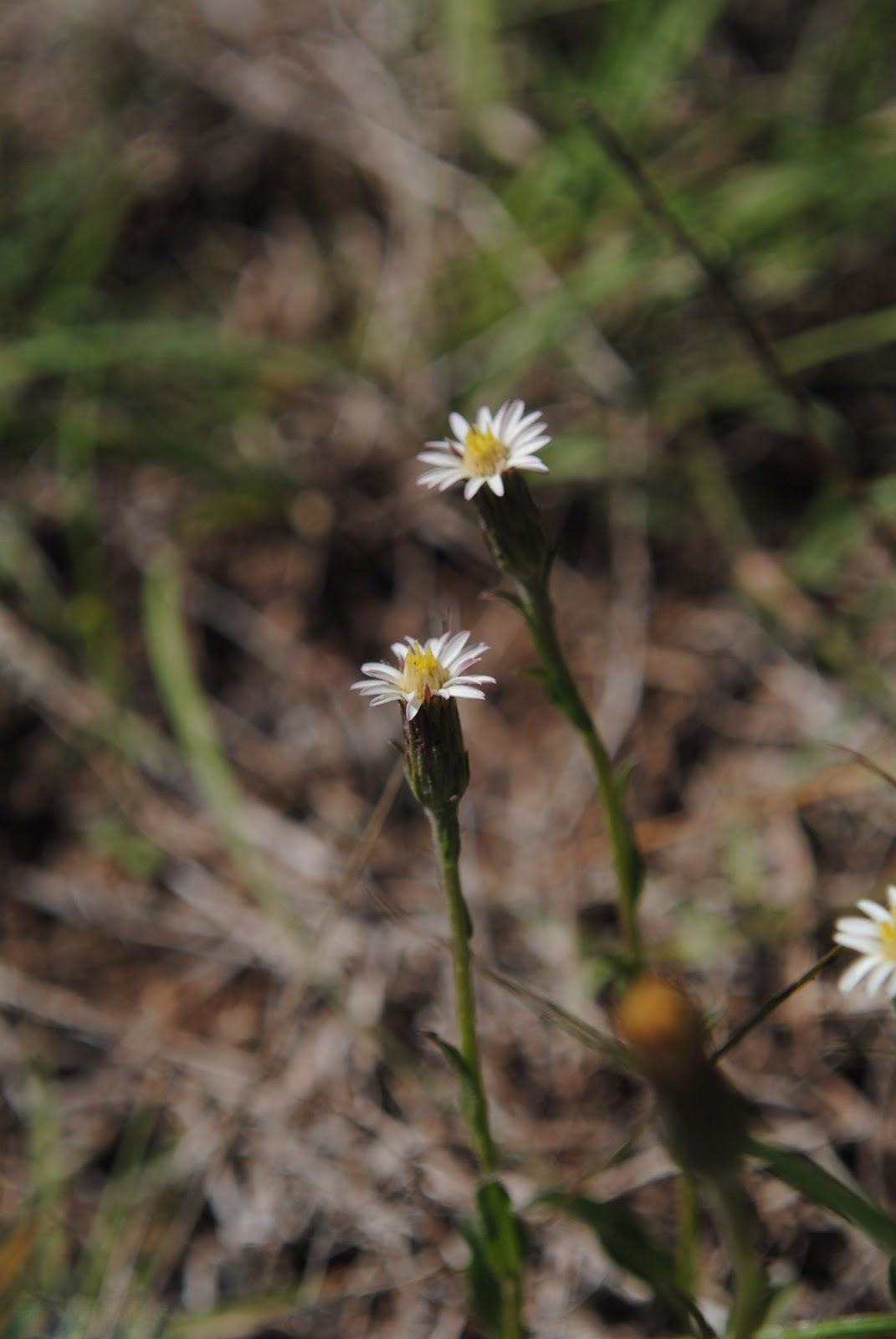
- Noticastrum marginatum

Scientific classification
- Kingdom: Plantae
- Clade: Embryophytes
- Clade: Tracheophytes
- Clade: Angiosperms
- Clade: Eudicots
- Clade: Asterids
- Order: Asterales
- Family: Asteraceae
- Subfamily: Asteroideae
- Tribe: Astereae
- Subtribe: Chrysopsidinae
- Genus: Noticastrum; DC.

Type species
- Noticastrum adscendens DC.

Synonyms
- Leucopsis (DC.) Baker

= Noticastrum =

Genus of flowering plants

Noticastrum is a genus of South American flowering plants in the family Asteraceae.

Species

- Noticastrum acuminatum (DC.) Cuatrec.
- Noticastrum adscendens DC.
- Noticastrum antucense Phil.
- Noticastrum argenteum Cabrera
- Noticastrum argentinense (Cabrera) Cuatrec.
- Noticastrum calvatum (Baker) Cuatrec.
- Noticastrum chebataroffii (Herter) Zardini
- Noticastrum decumbens (Baker) Cuatrec.
- Noticastrum diffusum (Pers.) Cabrera
- Noticastrum erectum J.Rémy
- Noticastrum eriophorum J.Rémy
- Noticastrum gnaphalioides (Baker) Cuatrec.
- Noticastrum hatschbachii Zardini
- Noticastrum jujuyense Cabrera
- Noticastrum macbridei Cuatrec.
- Noticastrum macrocephalum (Baker) Cuatrec.
- Noticastrum malmei Zardini
- Noticastrum marginatum (Kunth) Cuatrec.
- Noticastrum psammophilum (Klatt) Cuatrec.
- Noticastrum sanchezvegae J.Montoya, E.Linares & A.Galán
- Noticastrum sericeum (Less.) Phil.
