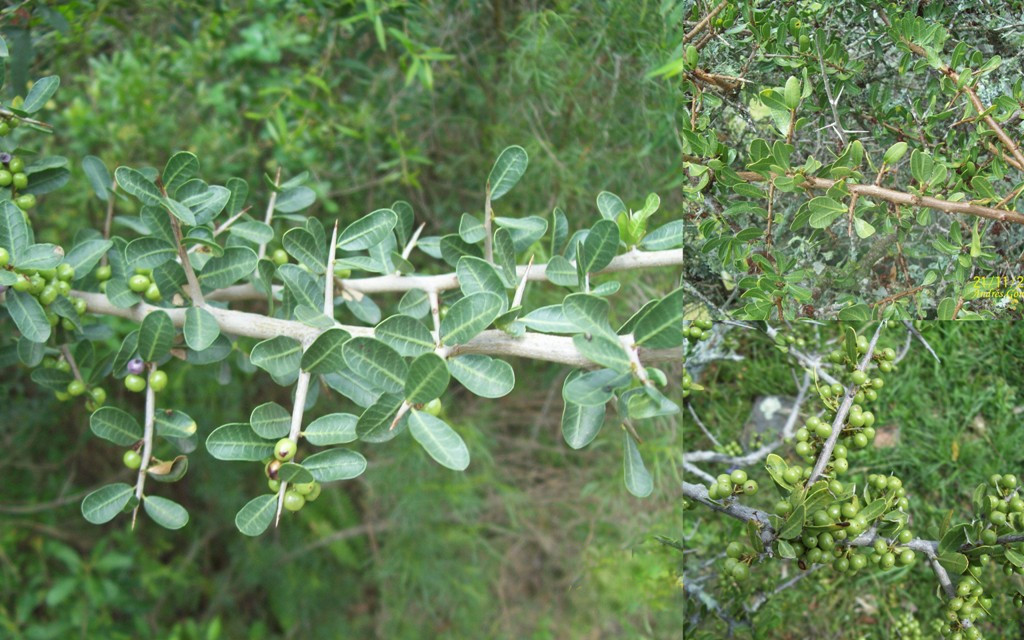

Conservation status
- Data Deficient (IUCN 2.3)

Scientific classification
- Kingdom: Plantae
- Clade: Tracheophytes
- Clade: Angiosperms
- Clade: Eudicots
- Clade: Rosids
- Order: Sapindales
- Family: Anacardiaceae
- Genus: Schinus
- Species: S. engleri

Binomial name
- Schinus engleri Barkley

= Schinus engleri =

Species of flowering plant

Schinus engleri is a species of plant in the family Anacardiaceae. It is found in Argentina, Brazil, and Uruguay. It is threatened by habitat loss. They are most abundantly found on the southern coast of Uruguay near Montevideo. They are pepper trees that are important to Eucecidoses Minutanus to create galls on.

== Description ==
Schinus engleri is a plant that bears flowers and peppercorns that grows in a subtropical environment. They have a green colored flowers are eudicots with five petals and five stamin. They also have compound leaves. These plants only flower in Spring and Summer. The S. Engleri is considered both a tree and shrub and stands about 3 meters tall (9.84 ft) flowers that are 1.5 mm long.

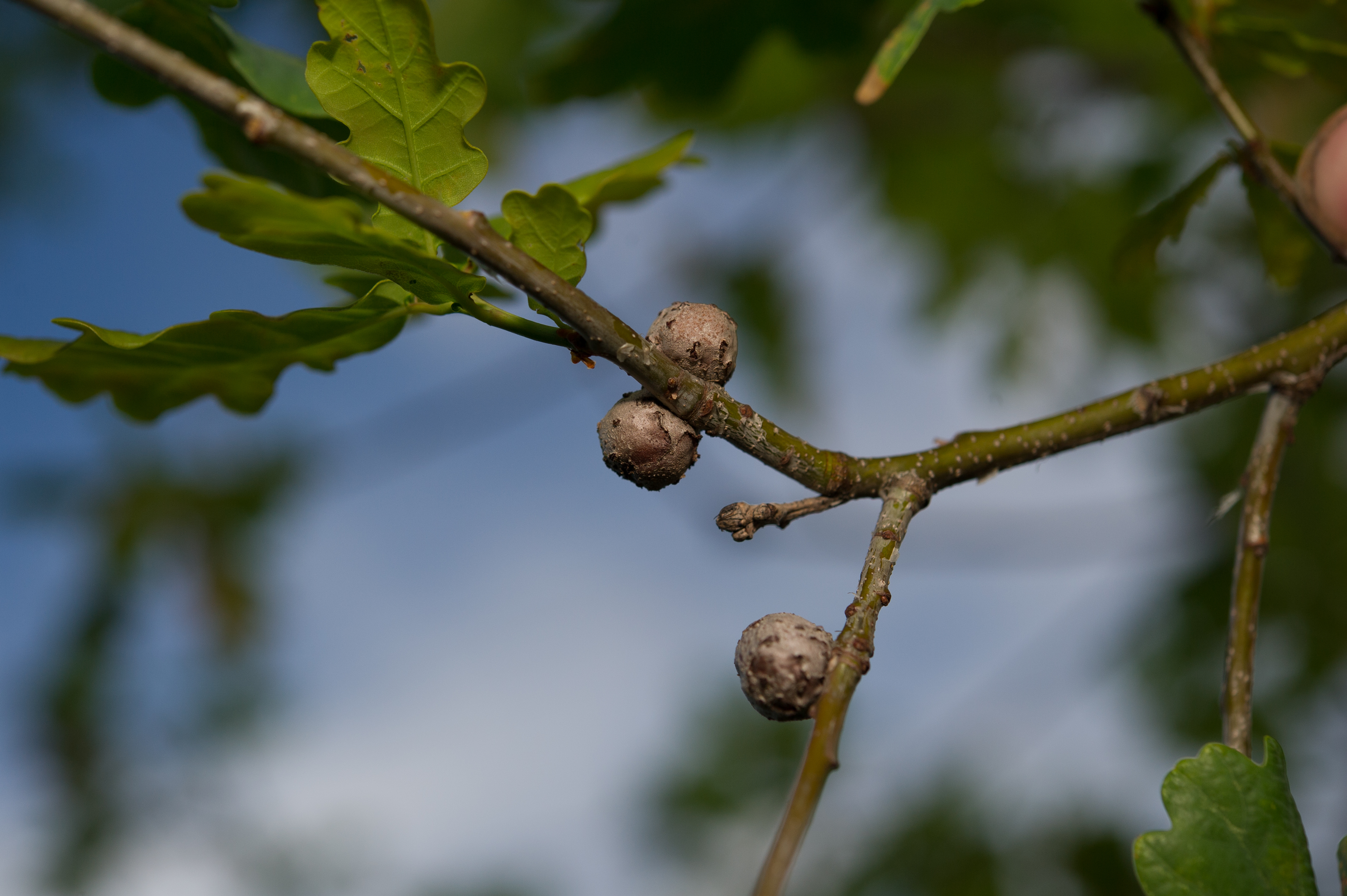
Galls on a plant

== Galls ==
Galls are growths that appear on the S. Engleri caused by the Eucecidoses Minutanus, which is a part of the Cecidosidae, the monotrysian moth family. The growths usually appear on the leaves, flowers, and roots. Galls are used by the larva of the insect as protection while also inducing changes to the structure of the S. Engleri. The stem gall modifies the plants tissues in each developmental stage of the E. Minutanus.
