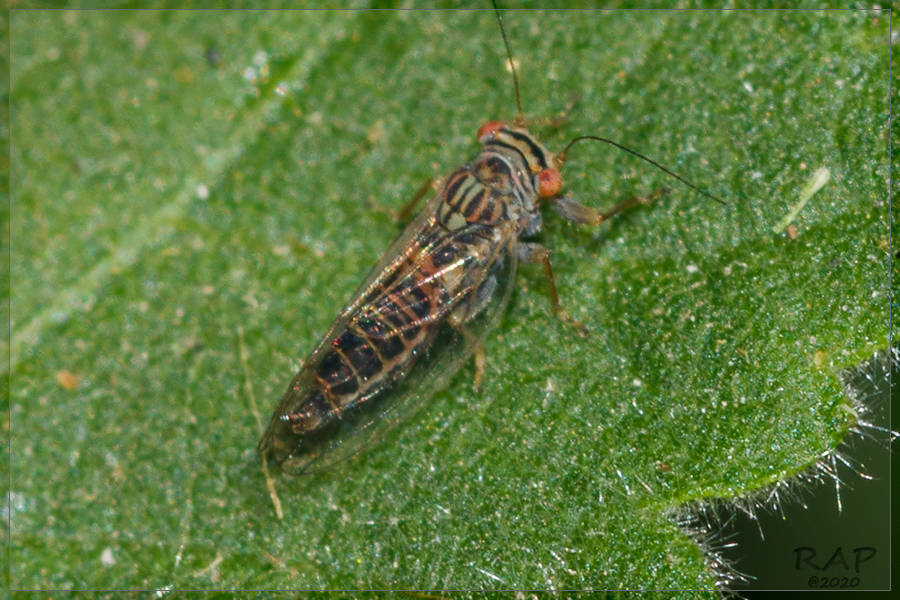
- Platycorypha nigrivirga, Argentina

Scientific classification
- Domain: Eukaryota
- Kingdom: Animalia
- Phylum: Arthropoda
- Class: Insecta
- Order: Hemiptera
- Suborder: Sternorrhyncha
- Superfamily: Psylloidea
- Family: Psyllidae
- Subfamily: Platycoryphinae
- Genus: Platycorypha
- Species: P. nigrivirga

Binomial name
- Platycorypha nigrivirga Burckhardt, 1987

= Platycorypha nigrivirga =

Insect

Platycorypha nigrivirga is an insect.

== Identification ==
Adult Platycorypha nigrivirga are yellowish or green and have a dark transverse stripe on the head. Dark markings are also present on the thorax. Wing cell is not strongly arched, flat and more than 1.7 times wider than high.

== Distribution ==
Specimens of Platycorypha nigrivirga have been collected from Argentina, Bolivia, Brazil, Spain, Uruguay and USA. The presence of Platycorypha nigrivirga was first noted in Southern California in October 2008 and its presence in Southern California was first published in 2009. The species is also known from Europe and Africa.

== Diet ==
Platycorypha nigrivirga is the only Platycorypha known to host Tipuana (Tipuana tipu). Tipu psyllid nymphs and adults feed on phloem. They attack young leaves and branches of Tipu trees causing the leaves on host plants to curl and drop prematurely. This behavior causes damage to ornamental usage of the tree in Southern California and other regions, leading local authorities to classify P. nigrivirga as a pest and invasive species.
