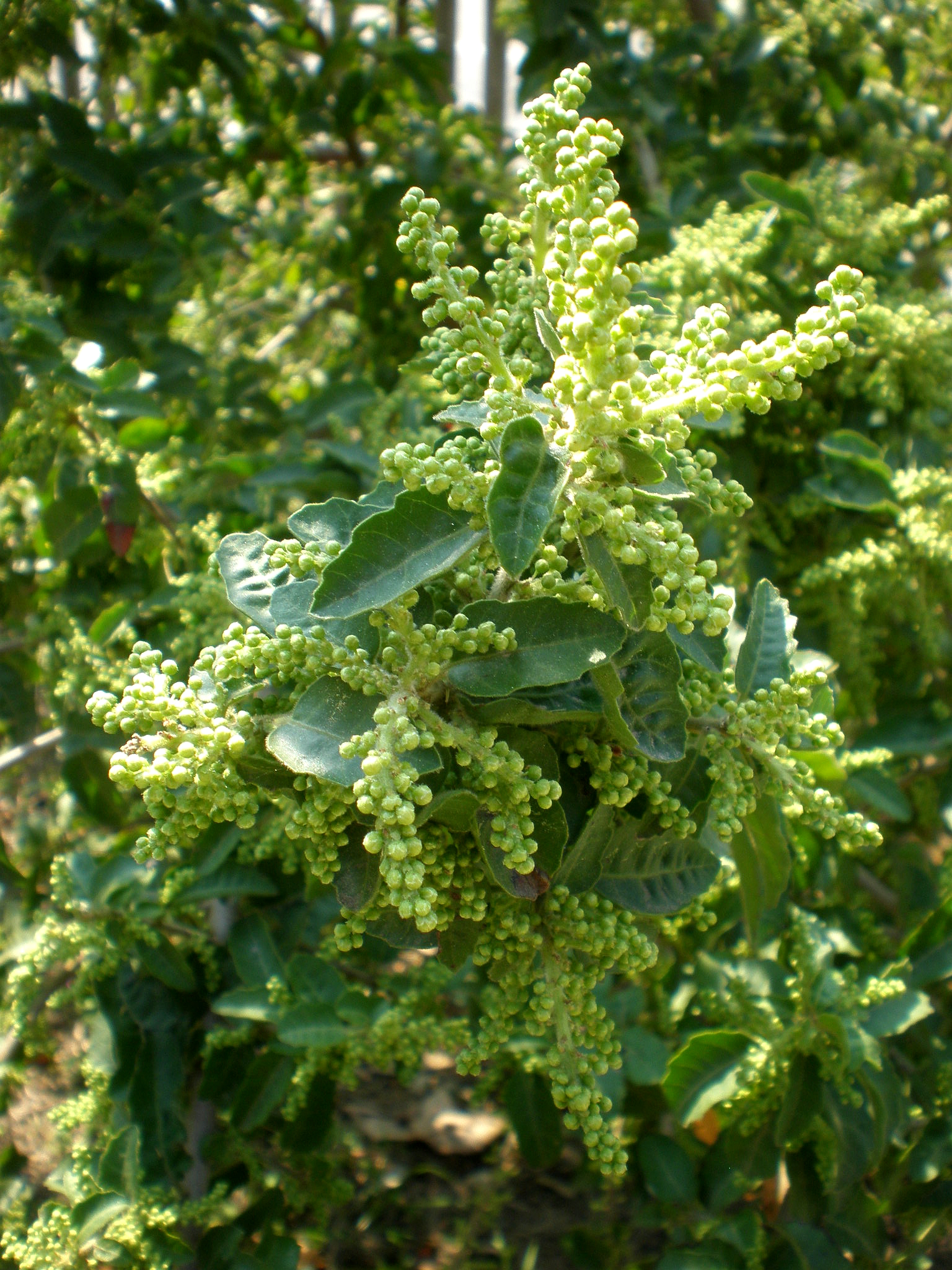

Scientific classification
- Kingdom: Plantae
- Clade: Tracheophytes
- Clade: Angiosperms
- Clade: Eudicots
- Clade: Rosids
- Order: Sapindales
- Family: Anacardiaceae
- Genus: Schinus
- Species: S. latifolia

Binomial name
- Schinus latifolia (Gillies ex Lindl.) Engl. (1876)

Synonyms
- Duvaua latifolia Gillies ex Lindl. (1833); Duvaua velutina Pasq. (1867) nom. illeg.; Lithraea molle Gay (1847); Mauria schickendantzii Hieron. & H.Lorentz ex Engl. (1883) not validly publ.; Schinus dependens var. latifolia (Gillies ex Lindl.) Marchand (1869); Schinus latifolia var. glabra Fenzl ex Engl. (1876)

= Schinus latifolia =

Species of flowering plant

Schinus latifolia, also known as Schinus latifolius, is a species of plant in the family Anacardiaceae. It is a tree endemic to central Chile.
