= Schinus pearcei =

Conservation status
- Data Deficient (IUCN 2.3)

Scientific classification
- Kingdom: Plantae
- Clade: Tracheophytes
- Clade: Angiosperms
- Clade: Eudicots
- Clade: Rosids
- Order: Sapindales
- Family: Anacardiaceae
- Genus: Schinus
- Species: S. pearcei

Binomial name
- Schinus pearcei Engl.

Synonyms
- Schinus diversifolia Rusby

Species of plant

Schinus pearcei is a species of plant in the family Anacardiaceae. It is found in Bolivia, Chile, and Peru.
