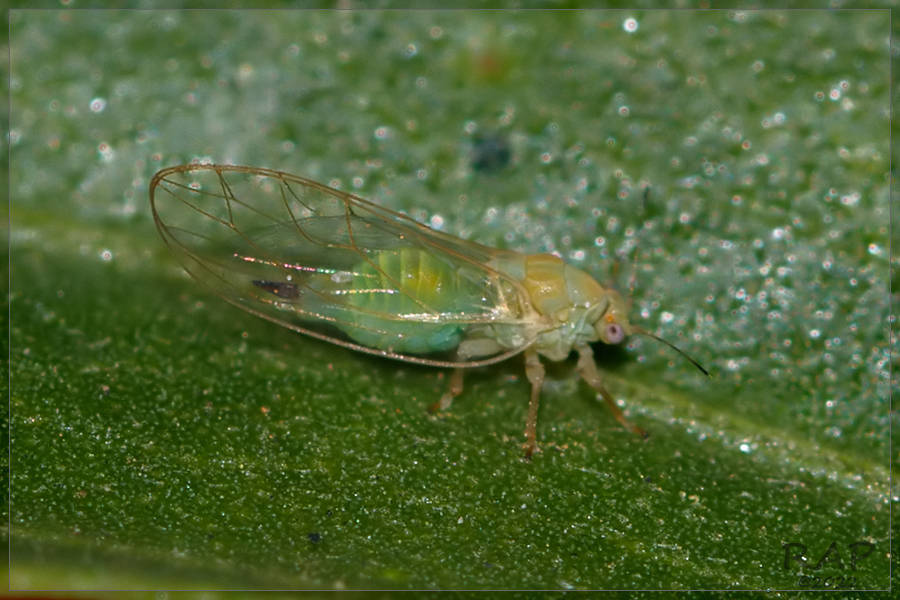
- Platycorypha erythrinae, Argentina

Scientific classification
- Kingdom: Animalia
- Phylum: Arthropoda
- Class: Insecta
- Order: Hemiptera
- Suborder: Sternorrhyncha
- Family: Psyllidae
- Subfamily: Platycoryphinae
- Genus: Platycorypha; Tuthill, 1945

Synonyms
- Neopsyllia

= Platycorypha =

Genus of bugs

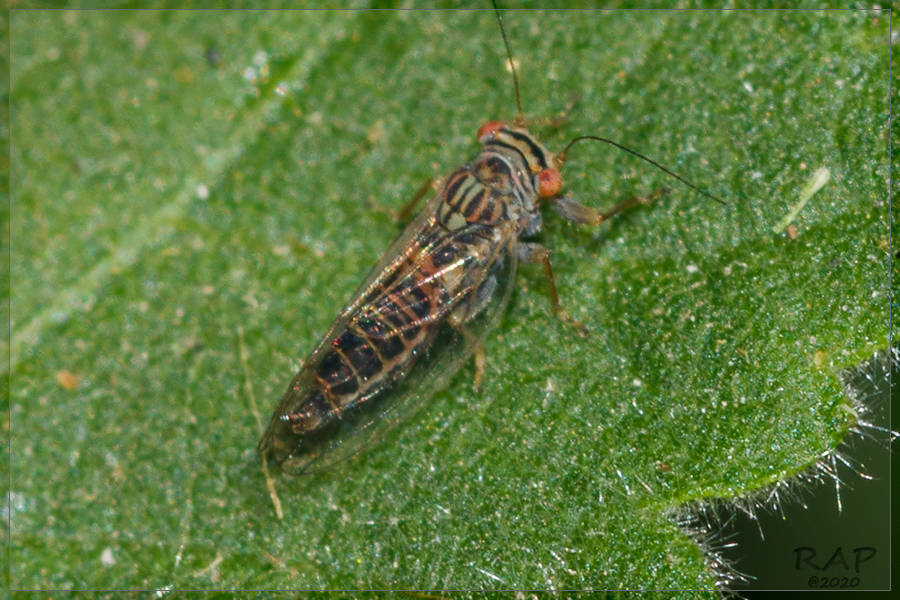
Platycorypha nigrivirga, Argentina

Platycorypha is a genus of jumping plantlice in the family Psyllidae and typical of the recently (2021) erected subfamily Platycoryphinae. There are about 16 described species in Platycorypha, two of which are extinct, found in the Americas, southern Europe, and Africa.

== Species ==
The Global Biodiversity Information Facility includes the following:

1. Platycorypha amabilis (Caldwell, 1947)
2. Platycorypha amazonica Burckhardt & Queiroz, 2020
3. Platycorypha atrifrons Burckhardt & Queiroz, 2020
4. Platycorypha cultrata Burckhardt & Queiroz, 2020
5. Platycorypha erythrinae (Lizer, 1918) (Psilídeo da eritrina)
6. Platycorypha fibris Burckhardt, 1987
7. Platycorypha leptopeus Burckhardt & Queiroz, 2020
8. Platycorypha magnifrons (Crawford, 1914)
9. Platycorypha nigrivirga Burckhardt, 1987 (tipu psyllid)
10. Platycorypha pinnata Burckhardt & Queiroz, 2020
11. Platycorypha princeps Tuthill, 1945
12. Platycorypha pycnopeus Burckhardt & Queiroz, 2020
13. Platycorypha rostrata Burckhardt & Queiroz, 2020
14. Platycorypha scalprata Burckhardt & Queiroz, 2020
15. † Platycorypha carabeus (Klimaszewski, 1997)
16. † Platycorypha olima (Klimaszewski, 1997)
