= Trachycarpus fortunei 'Wagnerianus' =

Palm cultivar

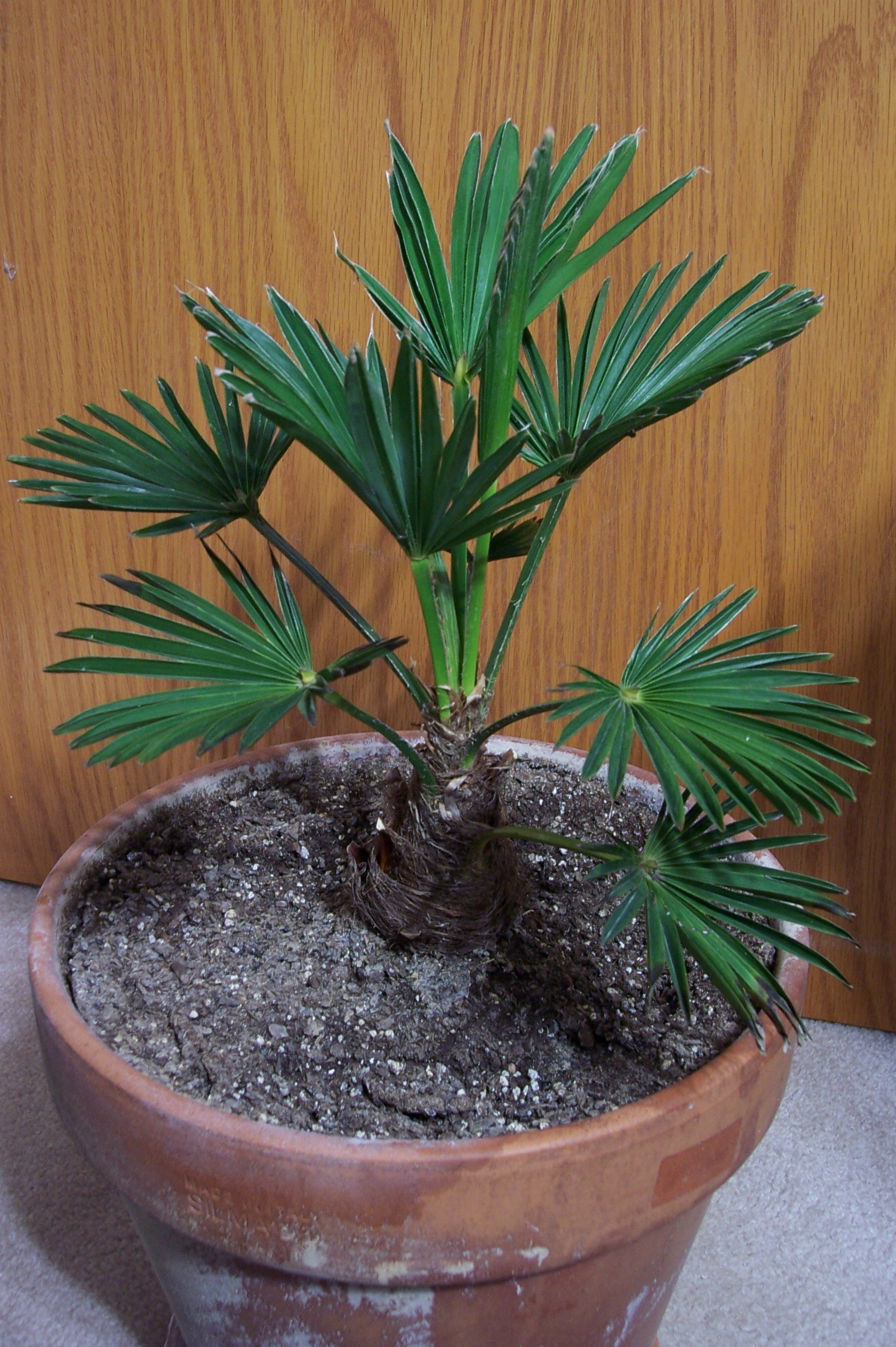
- Young Trachycarpus 'Wagnerianus'
- Species: Trachycarpus fortunei
- Cultivar group: 'Wagnerianus'
- Origin: Japan

Trachycarpus fortunei 'Wagnerianus' is unknown in the wild, but may have originated in cultivation in Japan, where it was first discovered by the horticulturalist Albert Wagner of Leipzig, Germany in the second half of the 19th century (in 1873). Wagner made several collecting trips to Japan and China in the 3rd quarter of the 19th century (as well as frequent trips to the Caribbean and South America.) He had a flourishing business growing palms in his steam-heated greenhouses in northern Germany. It has remained in comparative obscurity until recently, when its qualities as a garden plant were at last realized.

== Description ==
Trachycarpus 'Wagnerianus' is an easily identified cultivar, with small, stiff leaves (much unlike that of Trachycarpus fortunei). The leaves of younger are nearly circular, but those of older plants tend to be hemispherical. At all ages they are relatively small, from 50 to 70 cm (18 to 26 in) wide. and are borne on 60-to-90-centimeter-long (2 to 3 ft) petioles.

The leaf crown is hemispherical and often extended, especially in younger individuals. New growth is margined with a short but dense white woolly tomentum.

The palm's trunk grows to 9 m (30 ft) tall, or more sometimes, and is 20–25 cm (8–10 in) in diameter, when free of the leaf base fibers that tend to remain for a good while.

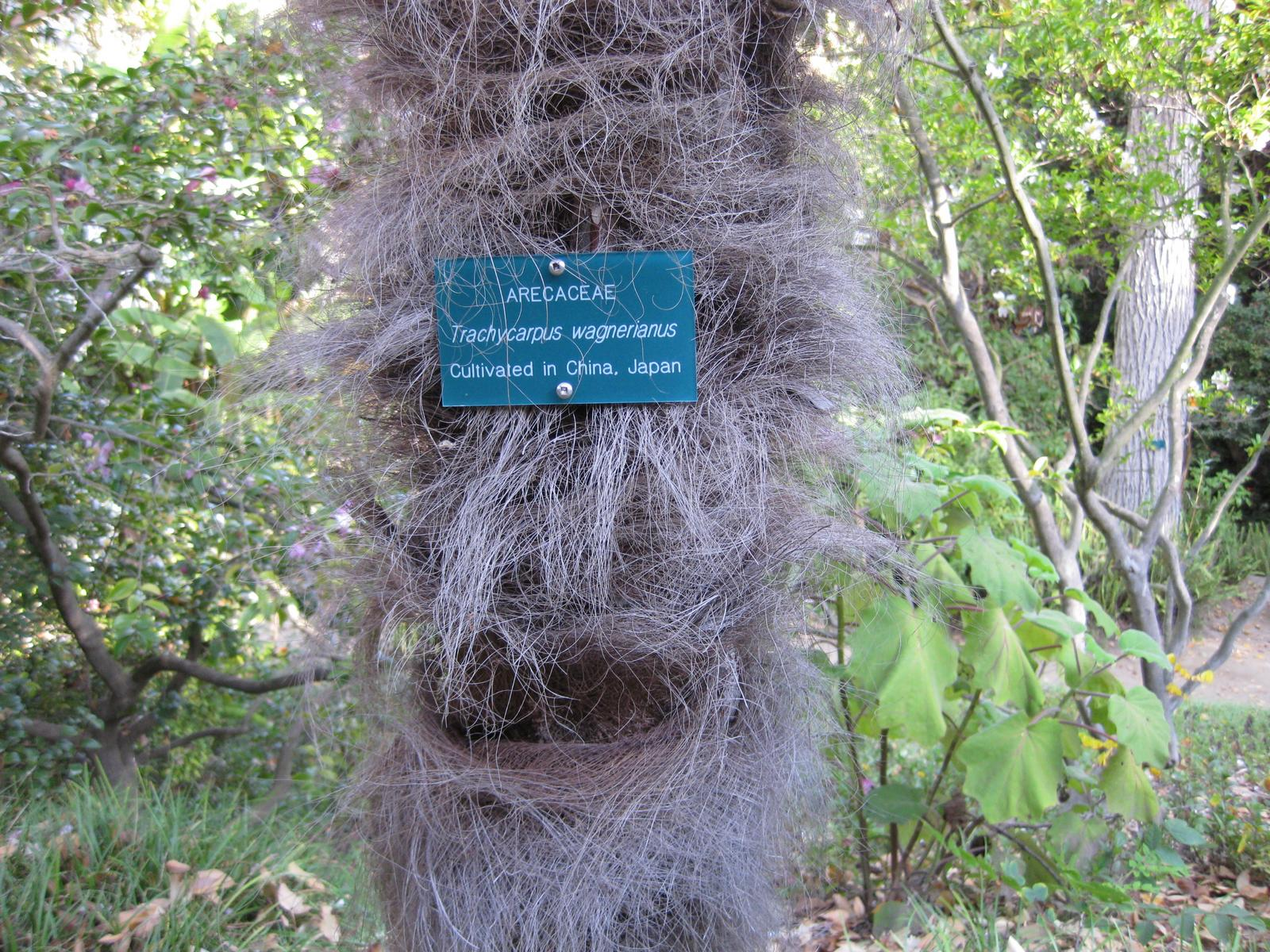
Mature trunk, with leaf base fibers.

== See also ==
- Hardy palms
