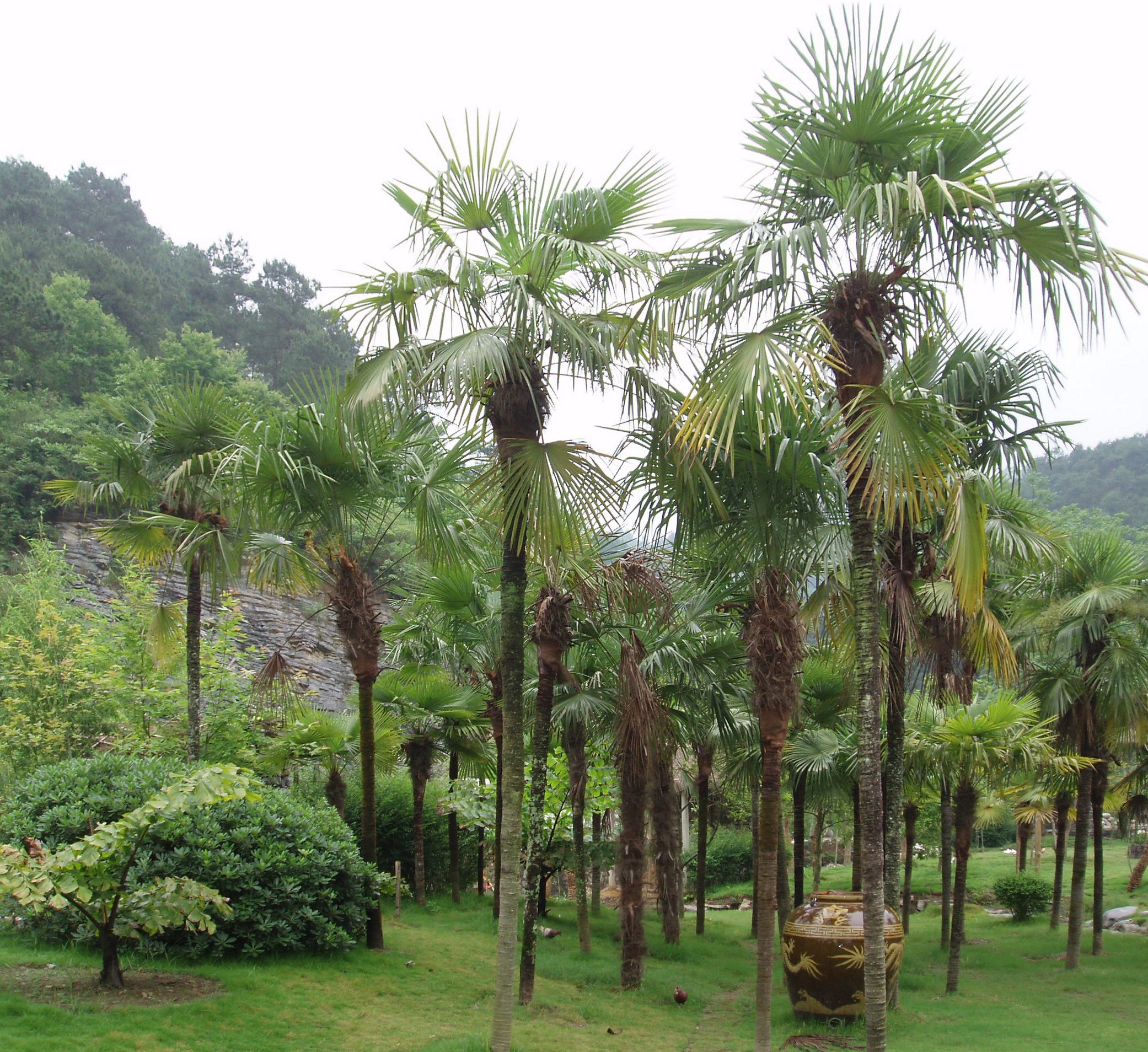

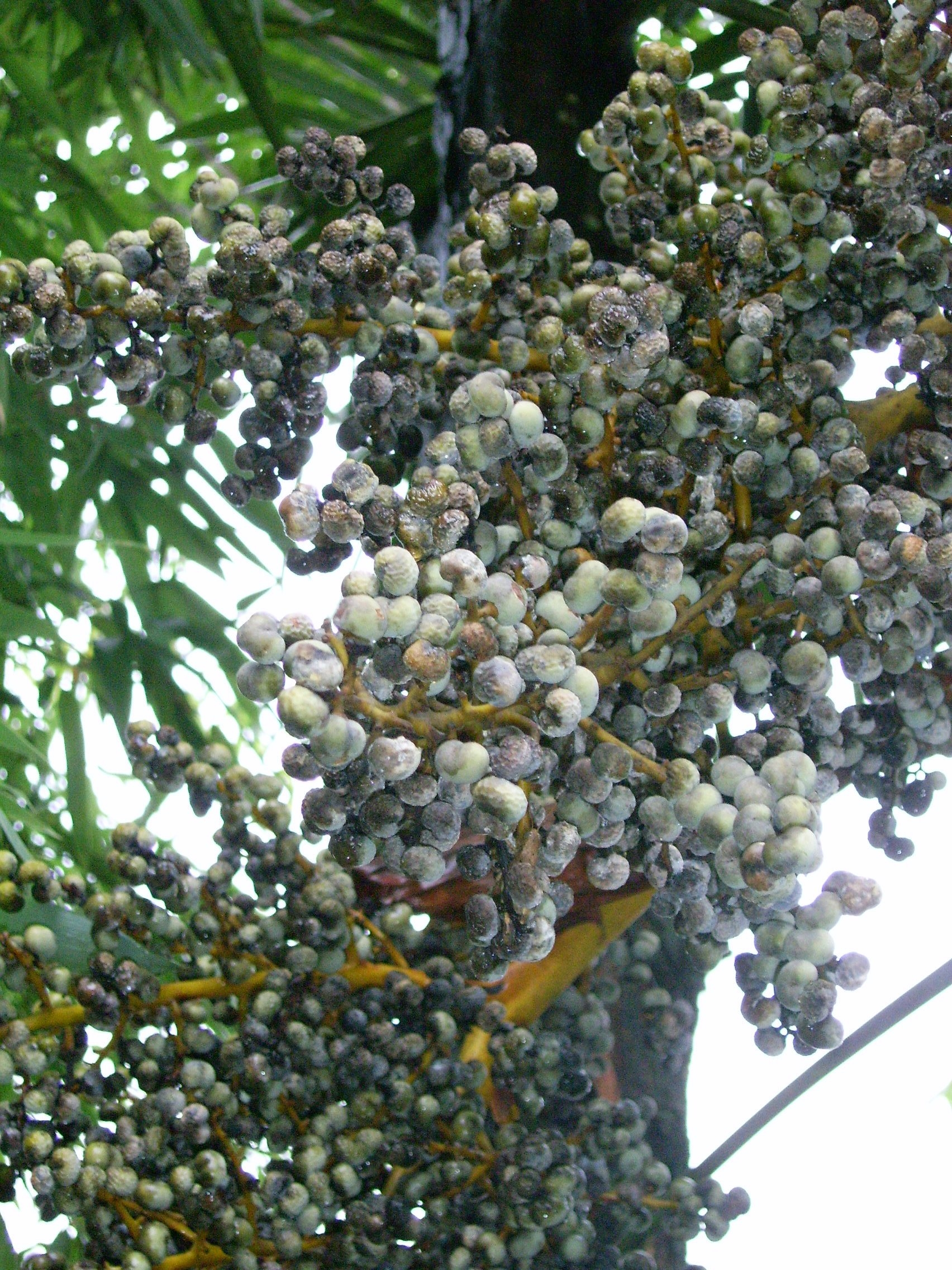

Conservation status
- Least Concern (IUCN 3.1)

Scientific classification
- Kingdom: Plantae
- Clade: Tracheophytes
- Clade: Angiosperms
- Clade: Monocots
- Clade: Commelinids
- Order: Arecales
- Family: Arecaceae
- Genus: Trachycarpus
- Species: T. fortunei

Binomial name
- Trachycarpus fortunei (Hook.) H.Wendl.

Synonyms
- Chamaerops excelsa hort.; Chamaerops fortunei Hook.; T. wagnerianus hort. ex Becc.

= Trachycarpus fortunei =

Species of palm

Trachycarpus fortunei, also known as the Chusan palm, Chinese windmill palm, hemp palm, or simply windmill palm, is a species of hardy evergreen palm tree in the family Arecaceae, native to parts of China, Japan, Myanmar and India.

== Description ==
Growing to 12–20 m (39–66 ft) tall, Trachycarpus fortunei is a single-stemmed fan palm. The trunk is up to 15–30 cm (6–12 in) diameter, with a very rough texture with the persistent leaf bases clasping the stem as layers of coarse dark grey-brown fibrous material. The leaves have long petioles which are bare except for two rows of small spines, terminating in a rounded fan of numerous leaflets. Each leaf is 140–190 cm (5–6 ft) long, with the petiole 60–100 cm (2–3 ft) long, and the leaflets up to 90 cm (3 ft) long. It is a somewhat variable plant, especially as regards its general appearance; and some specimens are to be seen with leaf segments having straight and others having drooping tips.

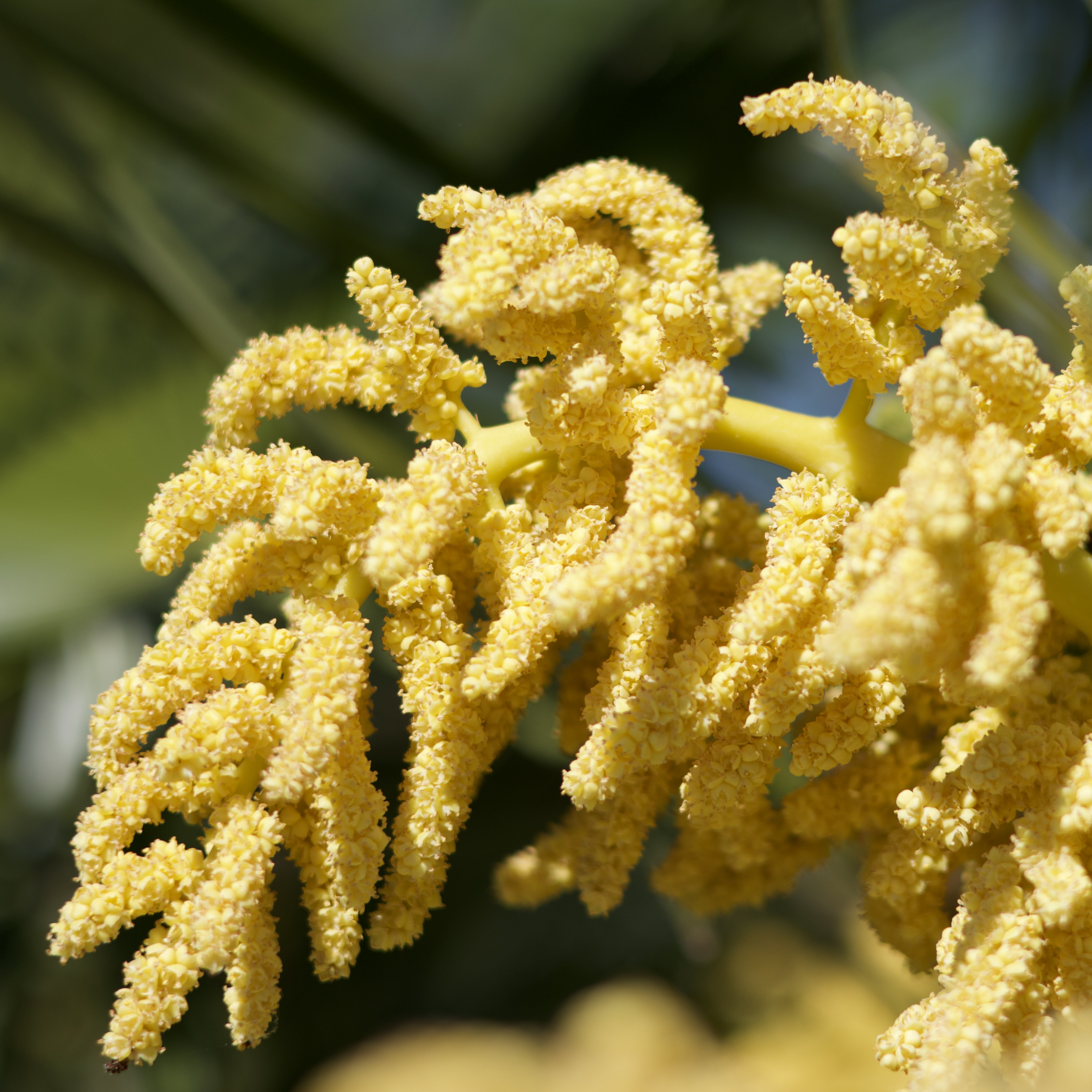
Trachycarpus fortunei flowers

The flowers are yellow (male) and greenish (female), about 2–4 mm (0.1–0.2 in) across, borne in large branched panicles up to 1 m (3 ft) long in spring; it is dioecious, with male and female flowers produced on separate trees. The fruit is a yellow to blue-black, reniform (kidney-shaped) drupe 10–12 mm (0.4–0.5 in) long, ripening in mid-autumn.

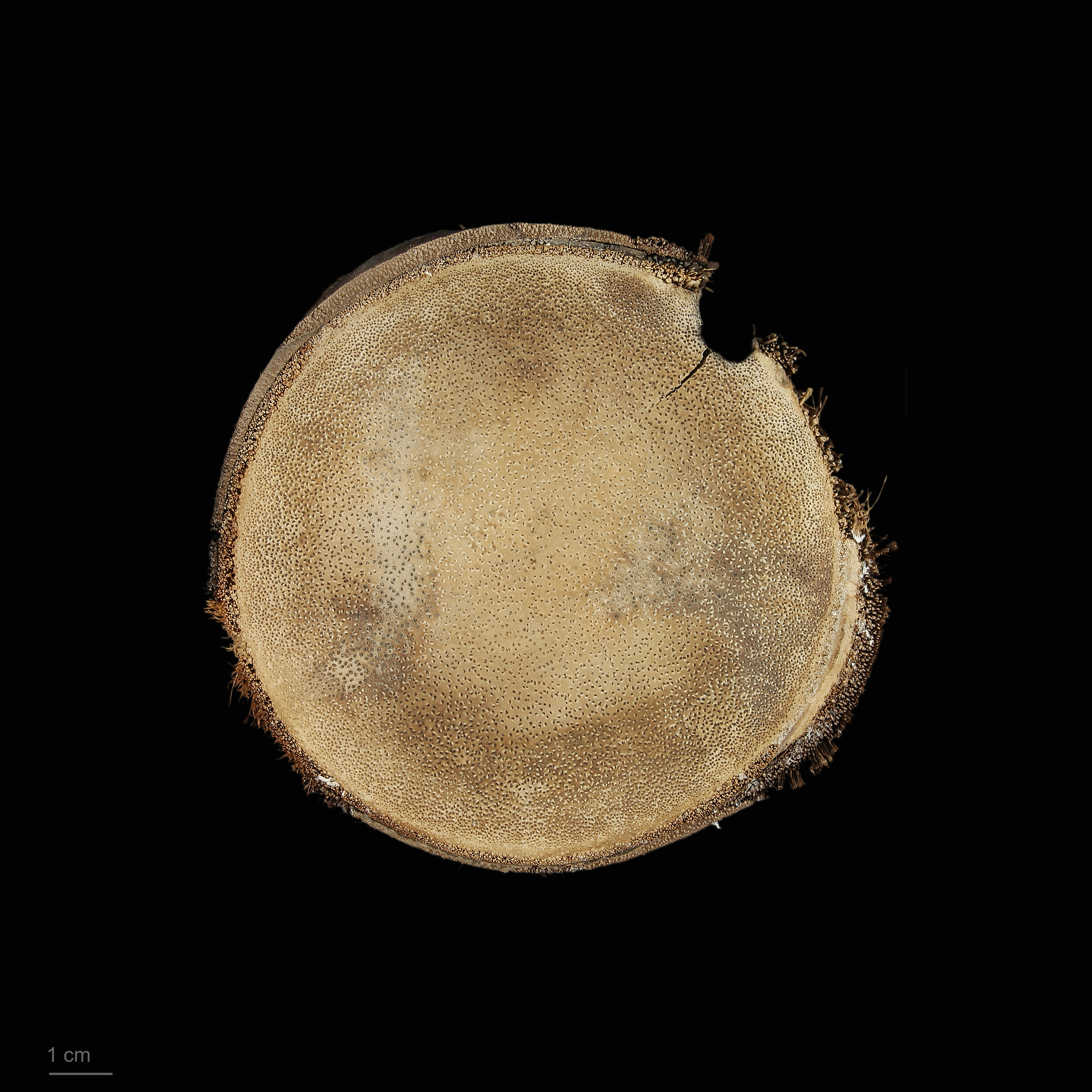
Trachycarpus fortunei - Stipe MHNT

== Distribution and habitat ==
This plant has been cultivated in China and Japan for thousands of years. This makes tracking its natural range difficult. It is believed to originate in central China (Hubei southwards), southern Japan (Kyushu), south to northern Myanmar and northern India, growing at altitudes of 100–2,400 m (328–7,874 ft).

Trachycarpus fortunei is one of the hardiest palms. It tolerates cool, moist summers as well as cold winters, as it grows at much higher altitudes than other species, up to 2,400 m (7,874 ft) in the mountains of southern China. However, it is not the northernmost naturally occurring palm in the world, as European fan palm (Chamaerops humilis) grows farther north in the Mediterranean.

== Uses ==
Trachycarpus fortunei has been cultivated in China and Japan for thousands of years, for its coarse but very strong leaf sheath fibre, used for making rope, sacks, and other coarse cloth where great strength is important. The extent of this cultivation means that the exact natural range of the species is uncertain.

=== Cultivation ===
Trachycarpus fortunei is cultivated as a trunking palm in gardens and parks throughout the world in warm temperate and subtropical climates. Its tolerance of cool summers and cold winters makes it valued by palm enthusiasts, landscape designers and gardeners. It is grown successfully in cool climates such as the UK, Ireland, France, Belgium, The Netherlands, coastal Poland as well as southern and western Germany. In the UK it has gained the Royal Horticultural Society's Award of Garden Merit.

The tallest reported in cultivation is 16.1 m (53 ft) tall, in a park at Uhart-Mixe, in Pyrénées-Atlantiques, France.

Due to its widespread use as an ornamental plant, the palm has become naturalised in southern regions of Switzerland, and has become an invasive species of concern.

In North America, mature specimens can be found growing in the coastal areas of the Pacific Northwest, the Upper South, and Mid-Atlantic states. They can found growing along the West Coast from California north to coastal southwestern British Columbia, and along the East Coast from northern Florida to coastal Connecticut. Lower tolerance limits of −15 to −20 °C (5 to −4 °F) are commonly cited for mature plants. Young plants are less hardy, and can be damaged by only −8 °C (18 °F). Lowest cold tolerance of well documented specimens include in Plovdiv, Bulgaria, which has survived a low temperature of -27.5 °C.

The cultivar group Trachycarpus fortunei 'Wagnerianus' is a small-leafed semi-dwarf variant of the species selected in cultivation in China and Japan. It differs in rarely growing to more than 5 m (16 ft) tall, with leaflets less than 45 cm (1 ft 6 in) long; the short stature and small leaves give it greater tolerance of wind exposure. It has often been treated as a separate species T. wagnerianus in popular works, but is now included within T. fortunei.

=== Cuisine ===
The young flower buds are cooked and eaten in a variety of ways.

== Nomenclature ==
The species was brought from Japan (specifically the trading post of Dejima) to Europe by the German physician Philipp Franz von Siebold in 1830. The common name refers to Chusan Island (now Zhoushan Island), where Robert Fortune first saw cultivated specimens. In 1849, Fortune smuggled plants from China to the Kew Horticultural Gardens and the Royal garden of Prince Albert of the United Kingdom. It was later named Trachycarpus fortunei, after him. It was first described by Carl Friedrich Philipp von Martius in 1850 in his Historia Naturalis Palmarum but under the illegitimate name of Chamaerops excelsa.

The names Chamaerops excelsus and Trachycarpus excelsus have occasionally been misapplied to Trachycarpus fortunei; these are correctly synonyms of Rhapis excelsa, with the confusion arising due to a misunderstanding of Japanese vernacular names.

== See also ==
- Hardy palms

== Gallery ==
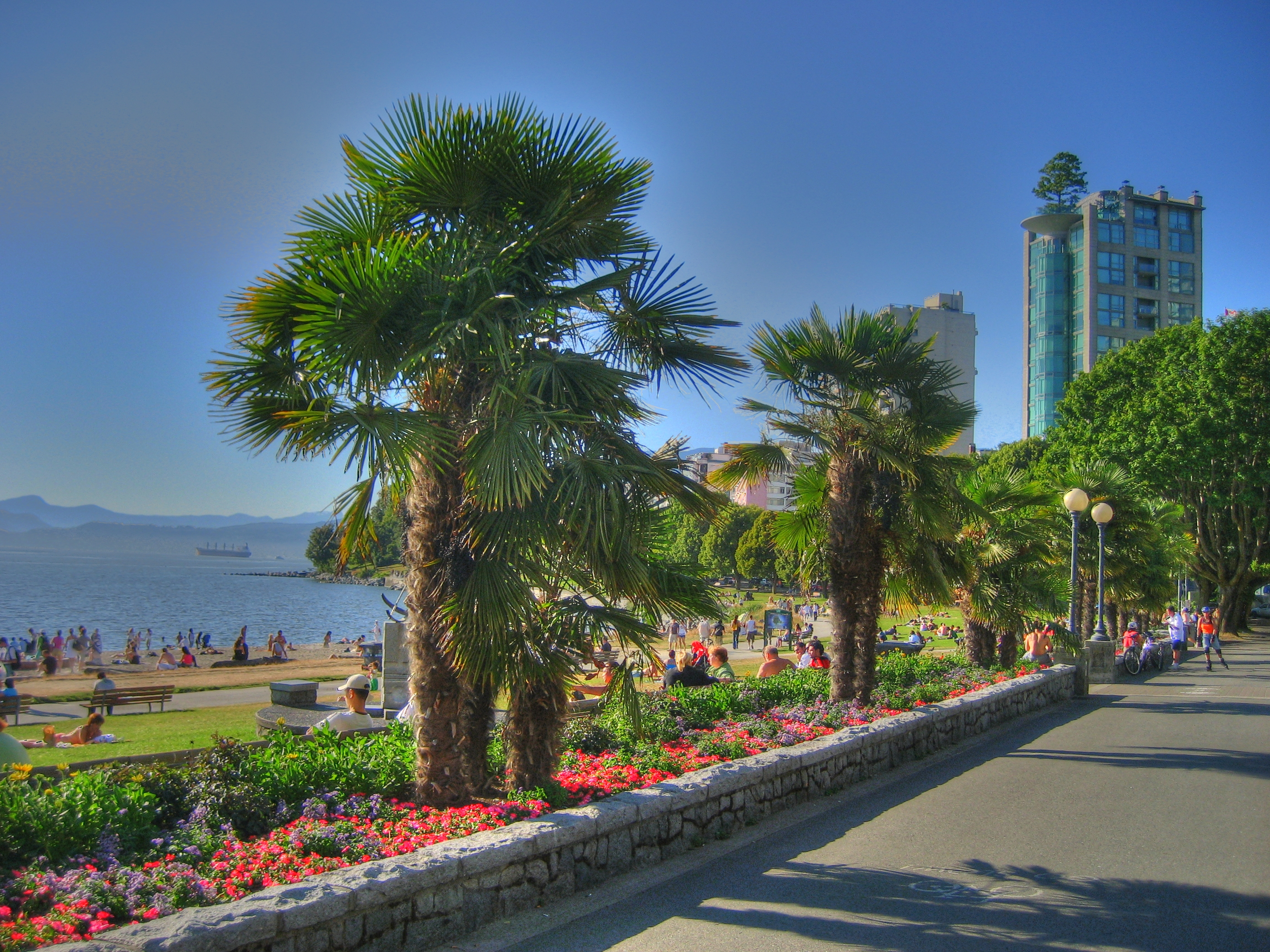
In English Bay, Vancouver, Canada

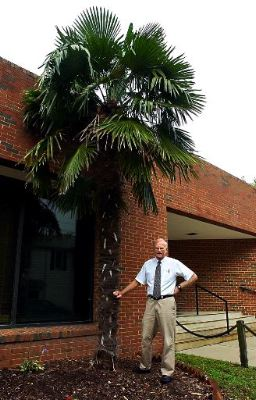
In Solomons Island, Maryland, US

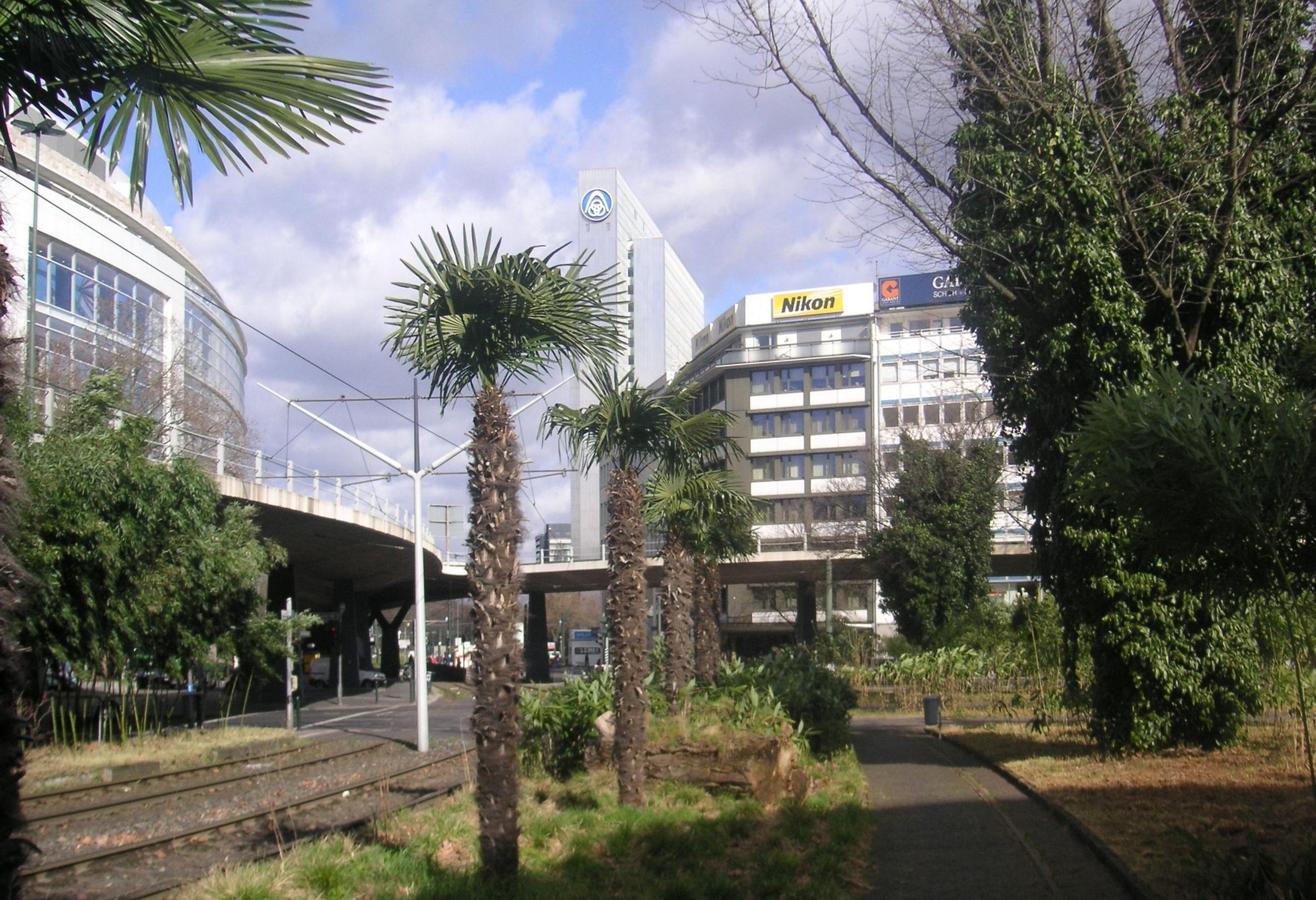
In Düsseldorf, Germany

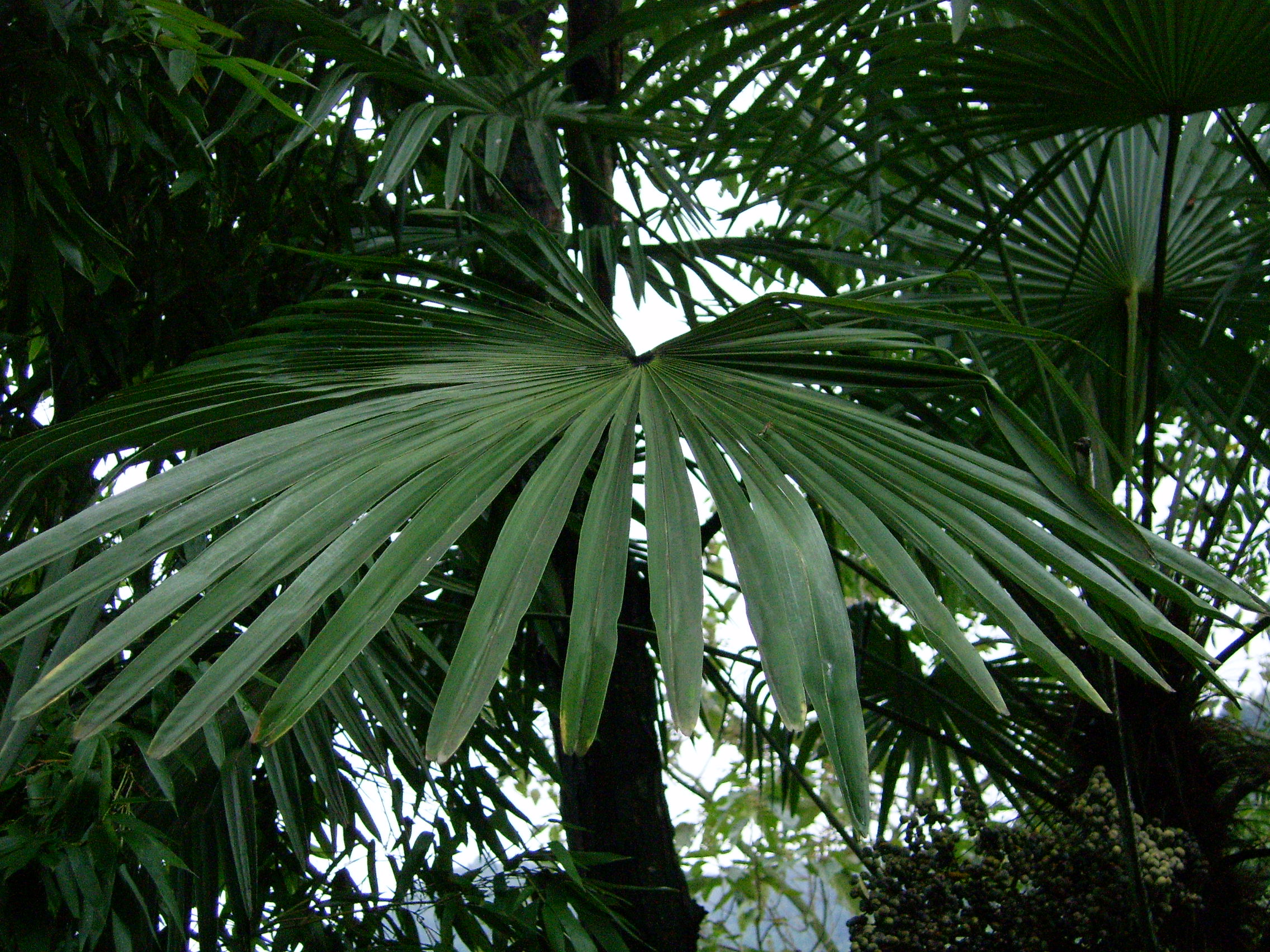
In Zhuji, China

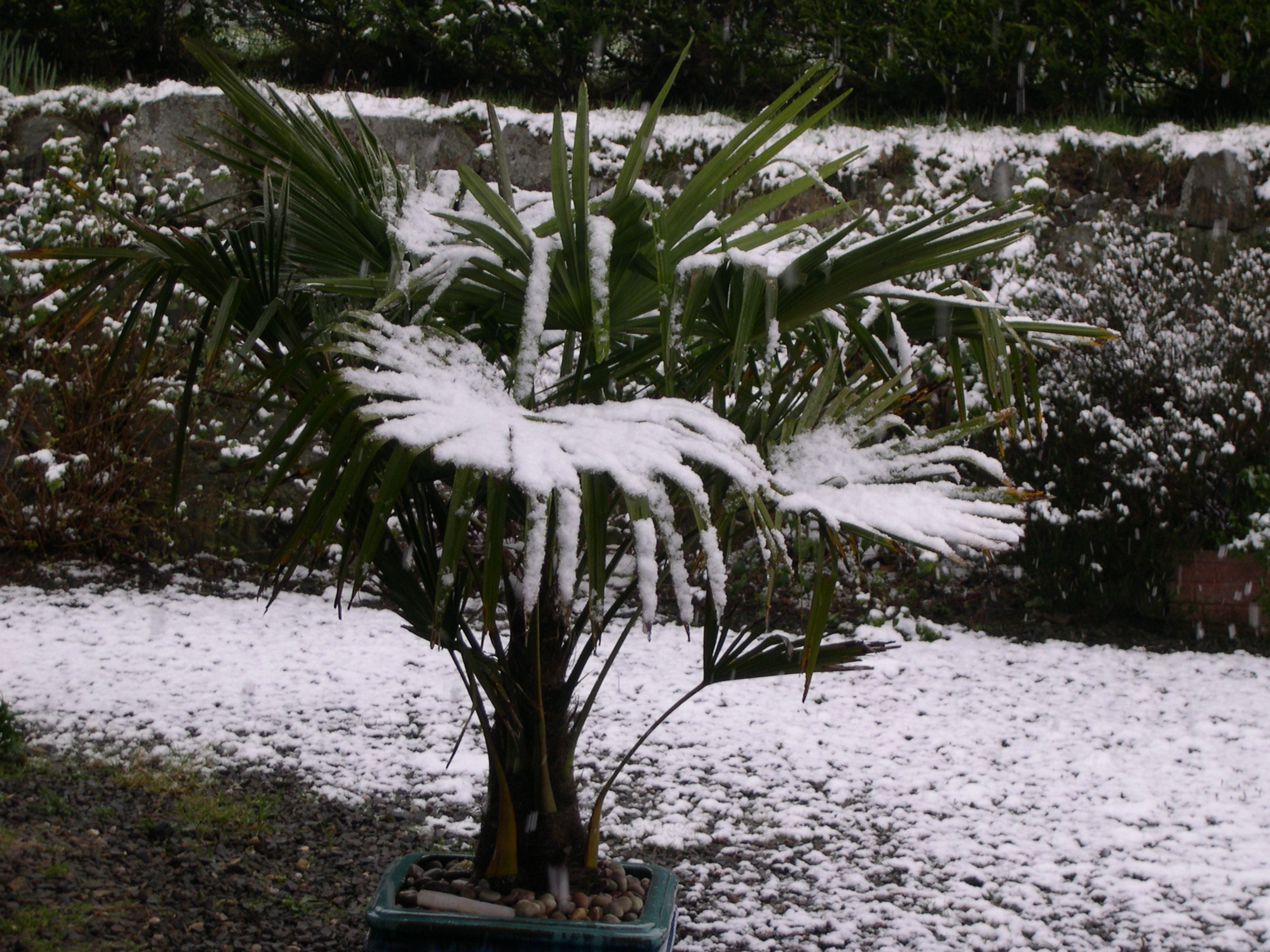
In Northern Ireland

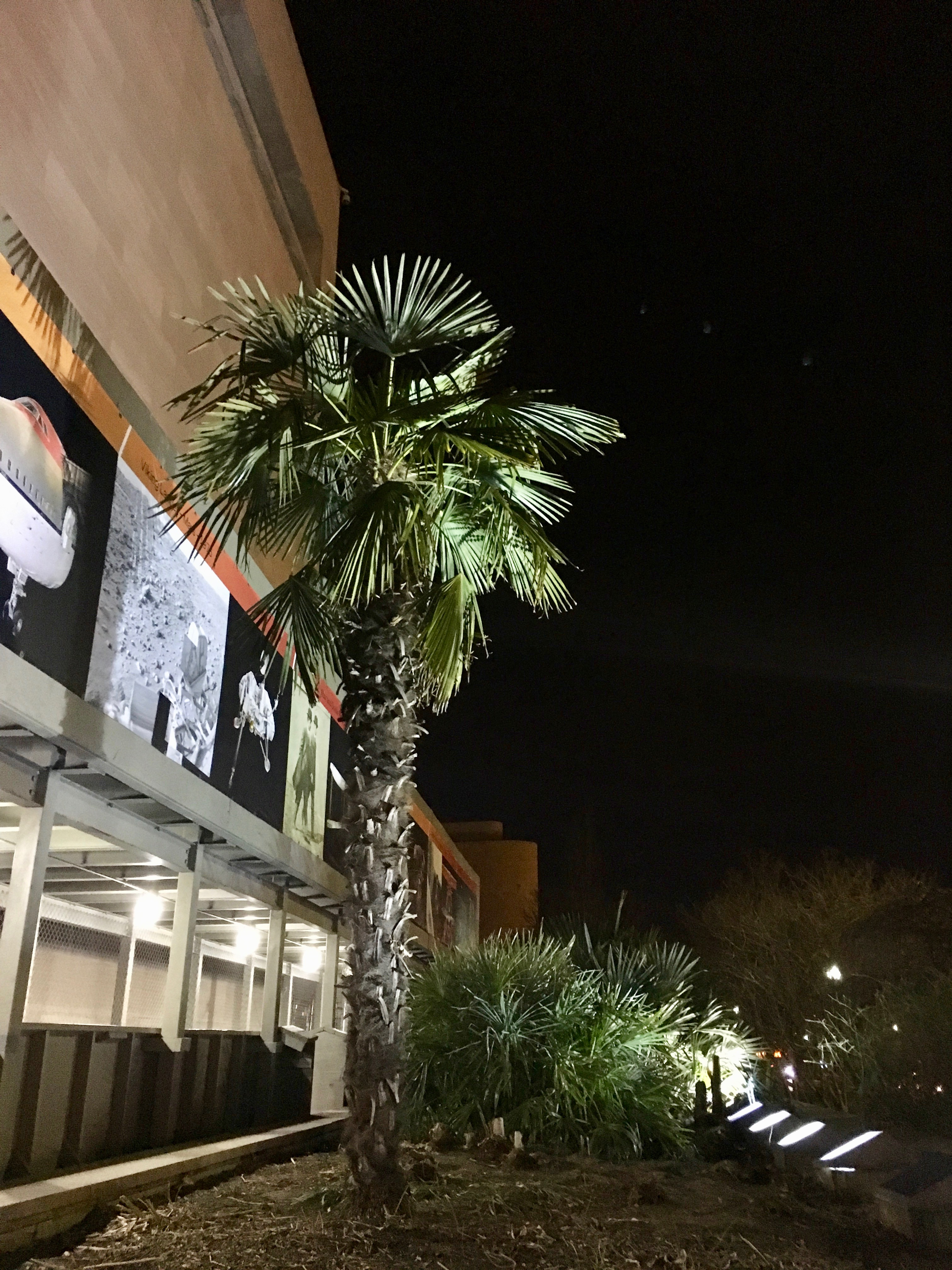
In Washington, D.C., US
