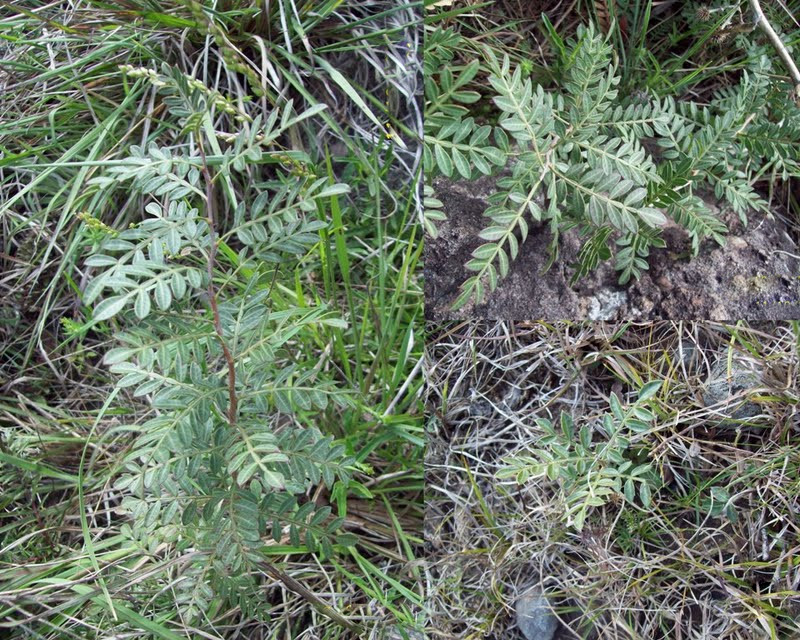

Scientific classification
- Kingdom: Plantae
- Clade: Tracheophytes
- Clade: Angiosperms
- Clade: Eudicots
- Clade: Rosids
- Order: Sapindales
- Family: Anacardiaceae
- Genus: Schinus
- Species: S. weinmanniifolia

Binomial name
- Schinus weinmanniifolia Engl. (1876)

Synonyms
- Schinus chebataroffii Herter

= Schinus weinmanniifolia =

Species of tree

Schinus weinmanniifolia, the Uruguayan pepper tree, is a native tree of Uruguay, northwest Argentina, Paraguay, and southern Brazil. It grows to 3 to 9 metres in height with a crown width of 3 to 5 metres.

Three varieties are recognized:

- Schinus weinmanniifolia var. hassleri (F.A.Barkley) F.A.Barkley
- Schinus weinmanniifolia var. riedeliana Engl.
- Schinus weinmanniifolia var. weinmanniifolia
