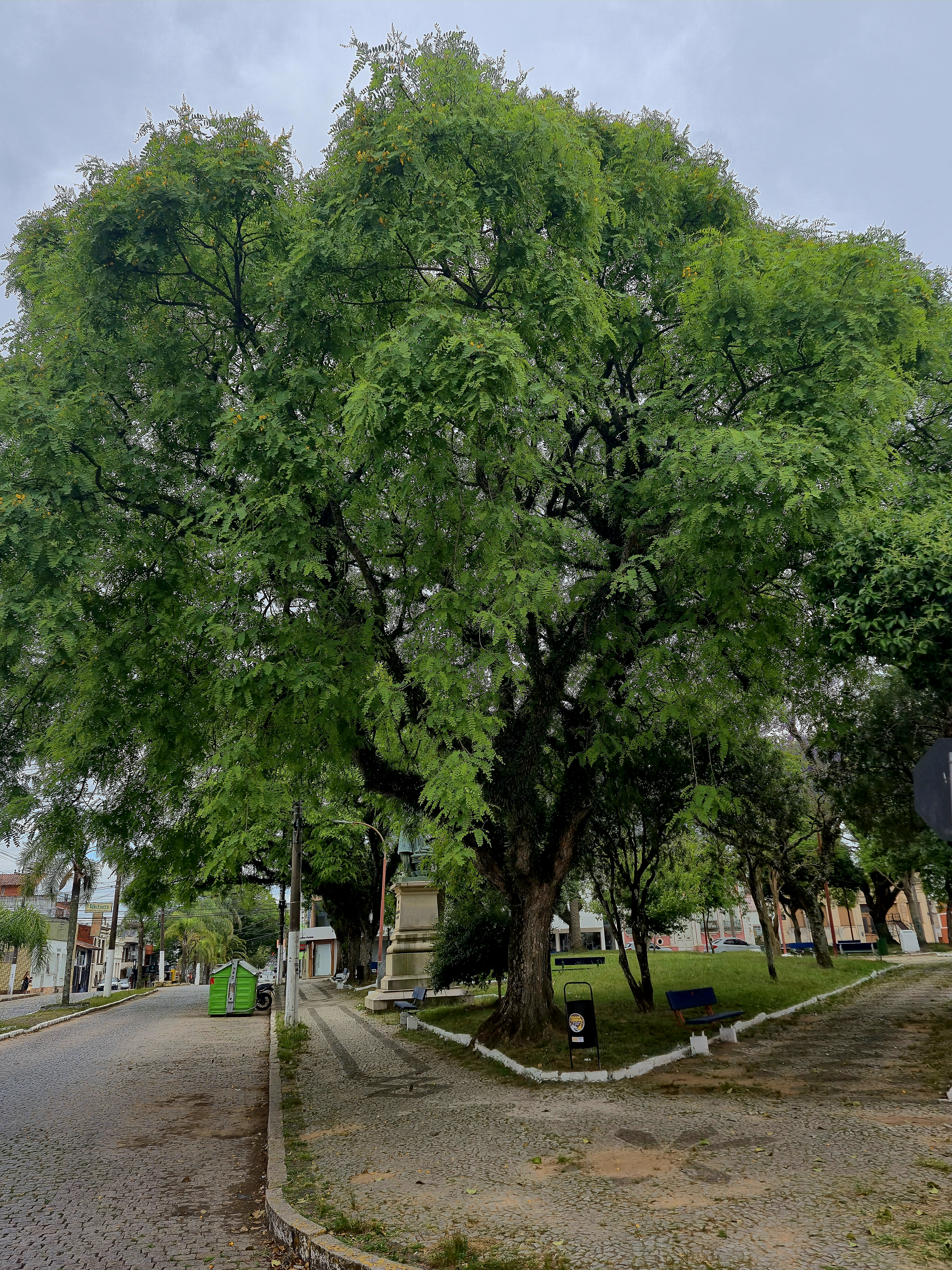
- Tipuana tipu in Brazil
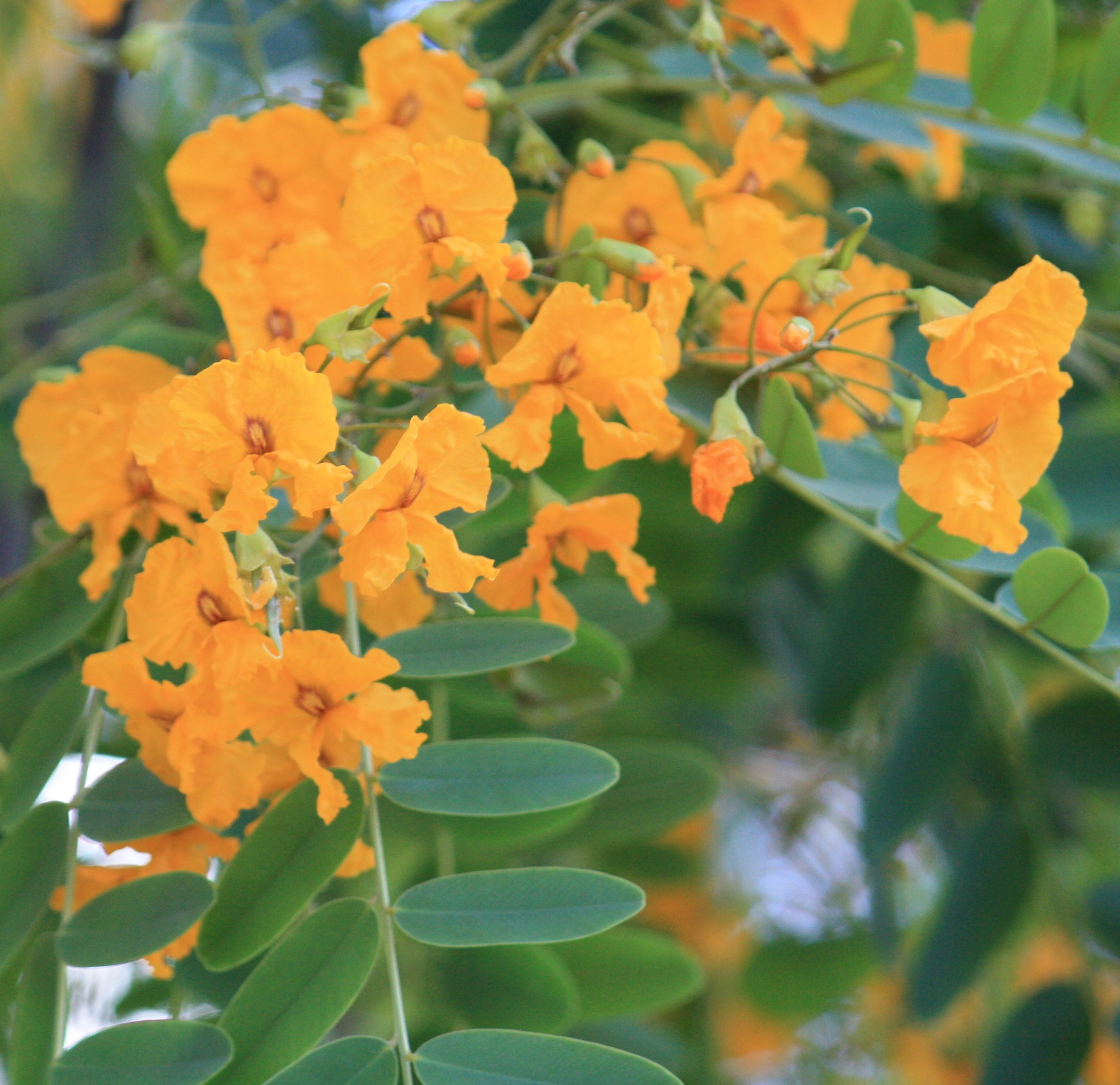
- Flowers

Conservation status
- Least Concern (IUCN 3.1)

Scientific classification
- Kingdom: Plantae
- Clade: Embryophytes
- Clade: Tracheophytes
- Clade: Spermatophytes
- Clade: Angiosperms
- Clade: Eudicots
- Clade: Rosids
- Order: Fabales
- Family: Fabaceae
- Subfamily: Faboideae
- Tribe: Dalbergieae
- Genus: Tipuana; Benth.
- Species: T. tipu

Binomial name
- Tipuana tipu (Benth.) Kuntze

Synonyms
- Machaerium tipu Benth.; Tipuana speciosa Benth.; Tipuana tipa Lillo

= Tipuana =

Genus of legumes

Tipuana tipu, also known as tipa, rosewood and pride of Bolivia, is a South American tree.

== Taxonomy ==
It is the only member of the genus Tipuana. It was recently assigned to the informal monophyletic Pterocarpus clade within the Dalbergieae.

== Physical characteristics ==
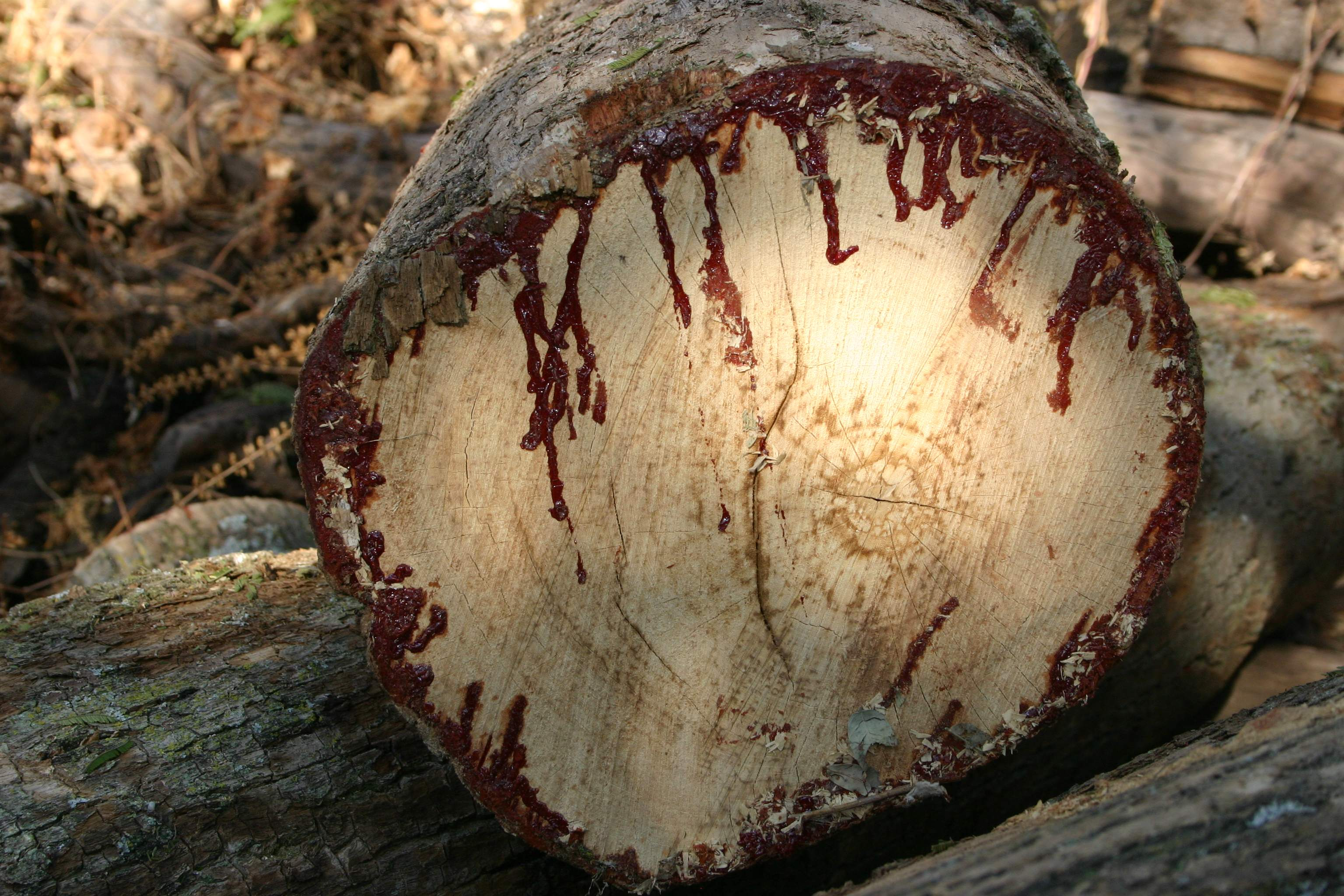
Cut logs ooze blood-red resin

Growing generally to 10–25 metres (33–82 ft), sometimes 30 m (98 ft), in height and 15–20 metres (49–66 ft) wide, Tipuana tipu is well known for its use as a shade tree. The leaves of the tree are pinnately compound, 10 inches (25 cm) long; the pinnules typically are 1 to 3 inches (2 to 7 cm) long, and are variably paripinnate or imparipinnate on the same tree. The flowers are bright yellow in color and bloom only briefly in the late summer. The fruit is a hard, pod with the seed at one end, resembling a samara (the fruit of the Ash genus, Fraxinus).

Depending on where it is grown, Tipuana is largely a deciduous tree, annually shedding all or most of its leaves and large "helicopter" pods from midwinter to spring. It produces masses of seeds, most of which succeed in germinating, and it can withstand a very wide range of growing conditions, from −4 °C (25 °F) to salty soils to drought. Timber is whitish in color, strong and fibrous.

== Invasiveness ==
Tipuana tipu is viewed as an invasive weed in some countries and is known for having a very aggressive root system. The tree roots can easily lift up concrete and asphalt. Precautions should be taken when planting near buildings, homes, or pools, as they are likely to be damaged. Damage may sometimes be averted by trenching near the structure to a depth of about 1 metre and filling the trench with building rubble or lining the trench with thick plastic sheeting or corrugated roofing sheets.

It is listed as a Category 3 Invasive species in South Africa. Category 3 species are regarded as having the proven potential of becoming invasive, and are not allowed to occur anywhere except in biological control reserves, unless they were already in existence when the regulations went into effect. The conditions on which these already existing plants may be retained are that they do not grow within 30 m from the 1:50 year flood line of watercourses or wetlands, that all reasonable steps are taken to keep the plant from spreading, and that the Executive Officer has the power to impose additional conditions or even prohibit the growing in any area where he has reason to believe that these plants will pose a threat to agricultural resources. Propagative material of these plants, such as seeds or cuttings, may no longer be planted, propagated, imported, bought, sold or traded in any way. It will, however, be legal to trade in the wood of Category 3 plants, or in other products that do not have the potential to grow or multiply.

== Insects ==
The species is a food plant for spittlebugs such as Ptyelus grossus. In Southern California, an insect called tipu psyllid (Platycorypha nigrivirga) has invaded several trees. In South Africa (Knysna) Tipuana is attacked by polyphagous shot hole borer (Euwallacea fornicatus).
