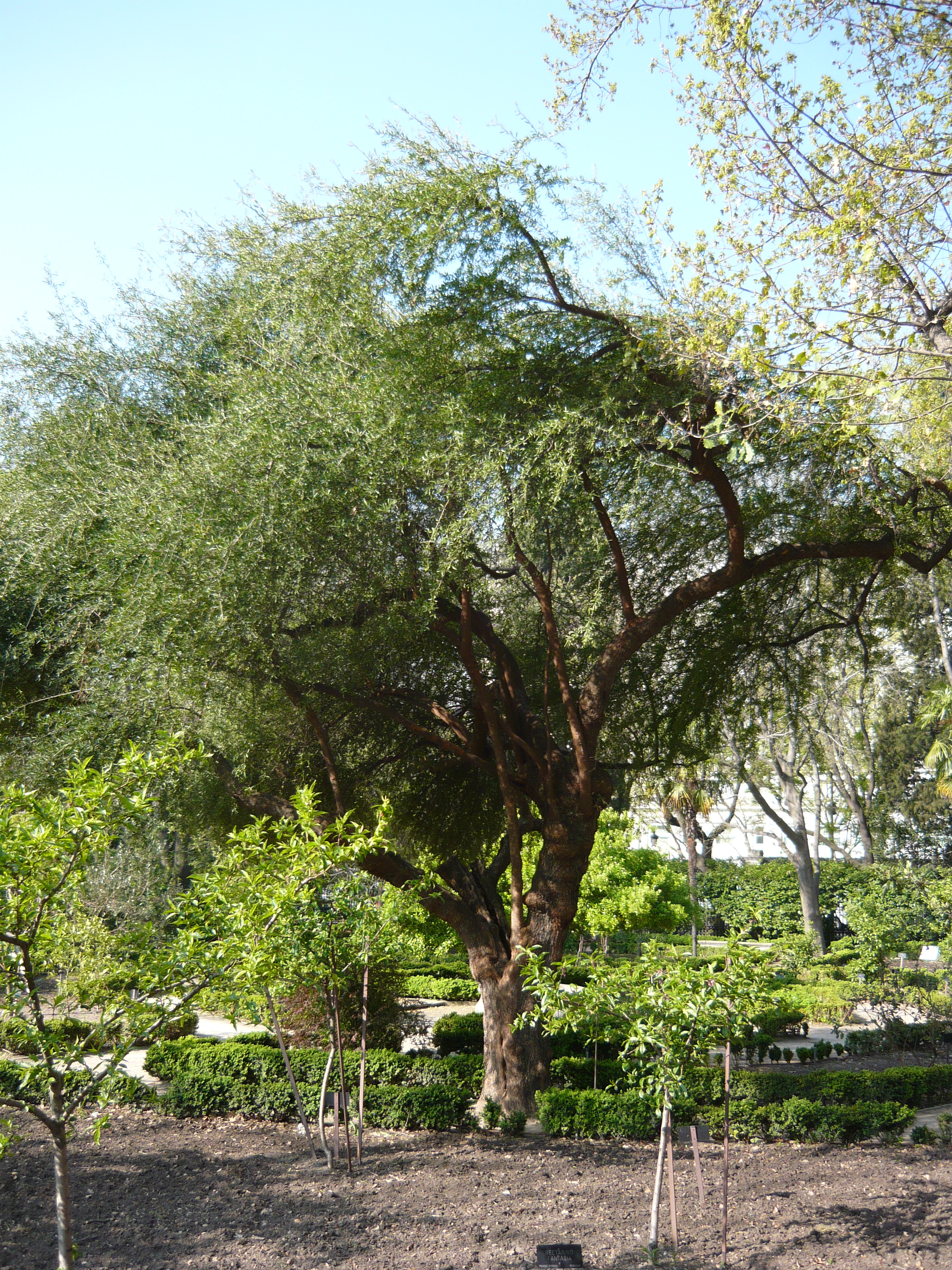

Conservation status
- Least Concern (IUCN 3.1)

Scientific classification
- Kingdom: Plantae
- Clade: Tracheophytes
- Clade: Angiosperms
- Clade: Eudicots
- Clade: Rosids
- Order: Sapindales
- Family: Anacardiaceae
- Genus: Schinus
- Species: S. polygama

Binomial name
- Schinus polygama (Cav.) Cabrera

= Schinus polygama =

Species of tree

Schinus polygama, the Hardee peppertree or Chilean pepper tree, is a species of plant in the family Anacardiaceae native to Argentina and Chile . Chilean pepper tree is naturalised in California and Queensland.

== Taxonomy ==
The species name has been spelled Schinus polygamus, which according to the rules of the International Code of Nomenclature for algae, fungi, and plants (article 62.1) is incorrect Latin grammar, and is "to be corrected" to Schinus polygama. This is because botanical tradition uses feminine grammatical gender for the genus name Schinus, as is the classical tradition for most genus names of trees that end in -us, and polygama is an adjective that must take a feminine form (not the masculine form polygamus).
