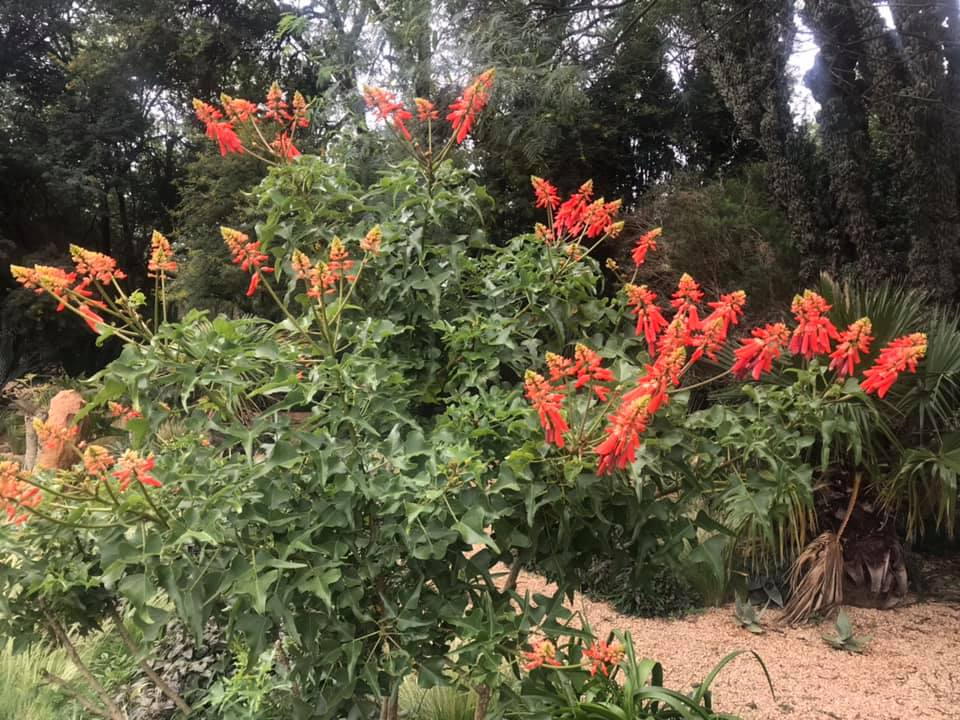
- habit of a large specimen

Scientific classification
- Kingdom: Plantae
- Clade: Tracheophytes
- Clade: Angiosperms
- Clade: Eudicots
- Clade: Rosids
- Order: Fabales
- Family: Fabaceae
- Subfamily: Faboideae
- Genus: Erythrina
- Species: E. humeana

Binomial name
- Erythrina humeana Spreng.

= Erythrina humeana =

Natal coral

Species of legume

Erythrina humeana, commonly known as the dwarf coral tree, dwarf erythrina or Natal coral tree, is an ornamental tree native to South Africa. (Note: It is also commonly known in English as the dwarf kaffirboom, although this is offensive to many (see Kaffir (racial term)))

== Gallery ==
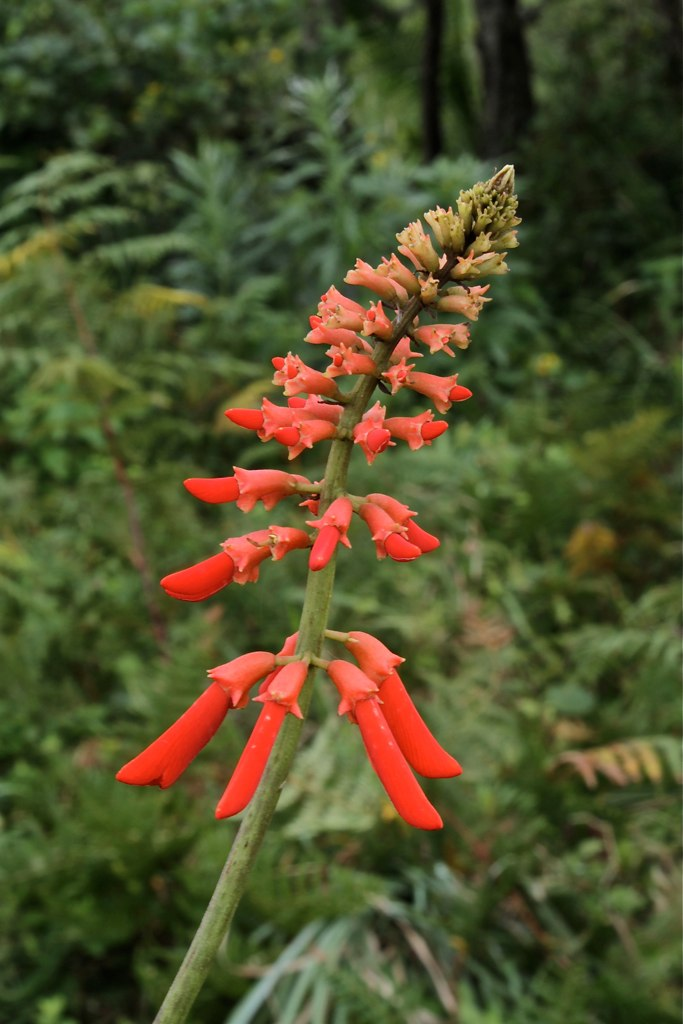
inflorescence

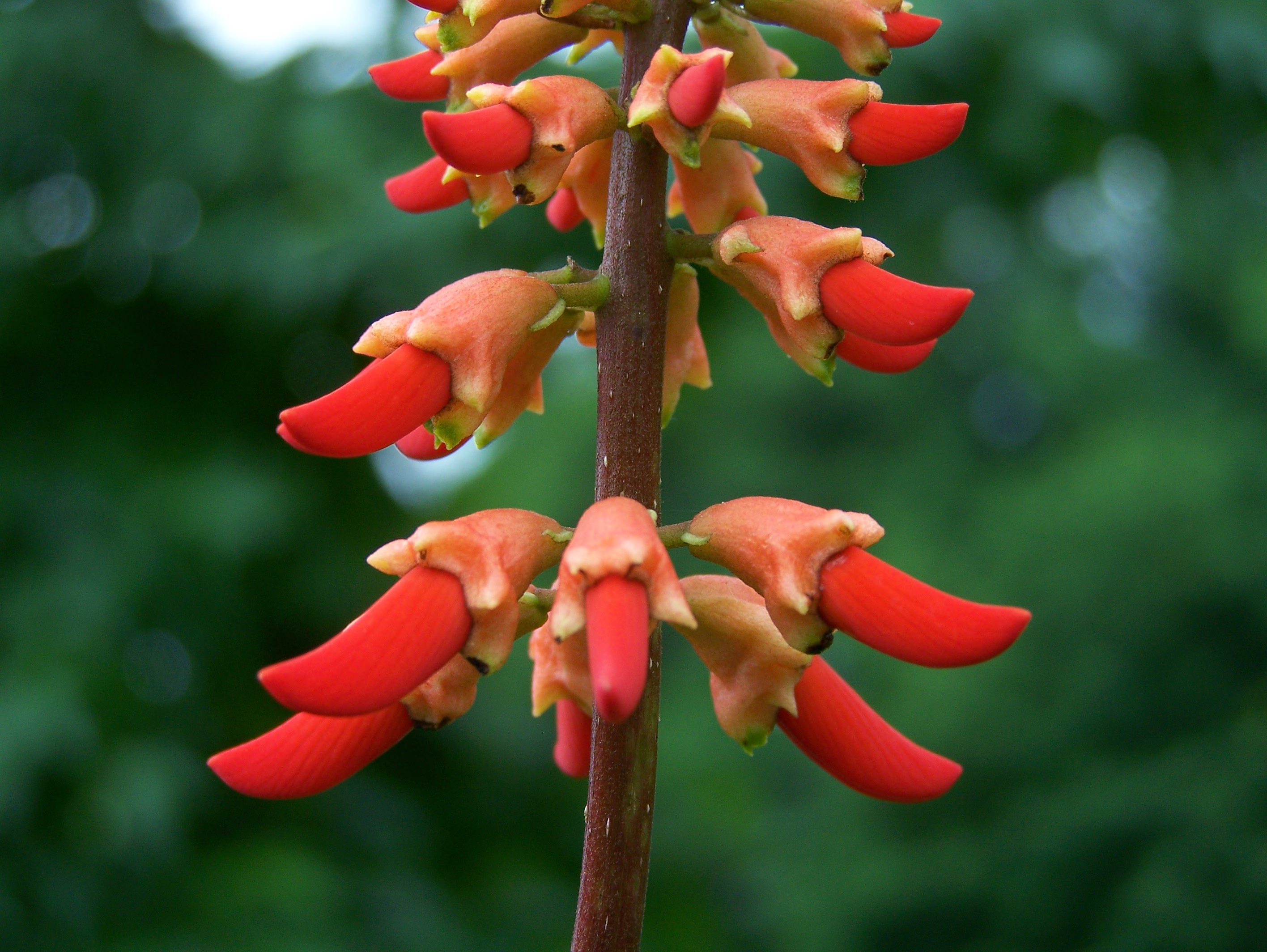
individual flowers

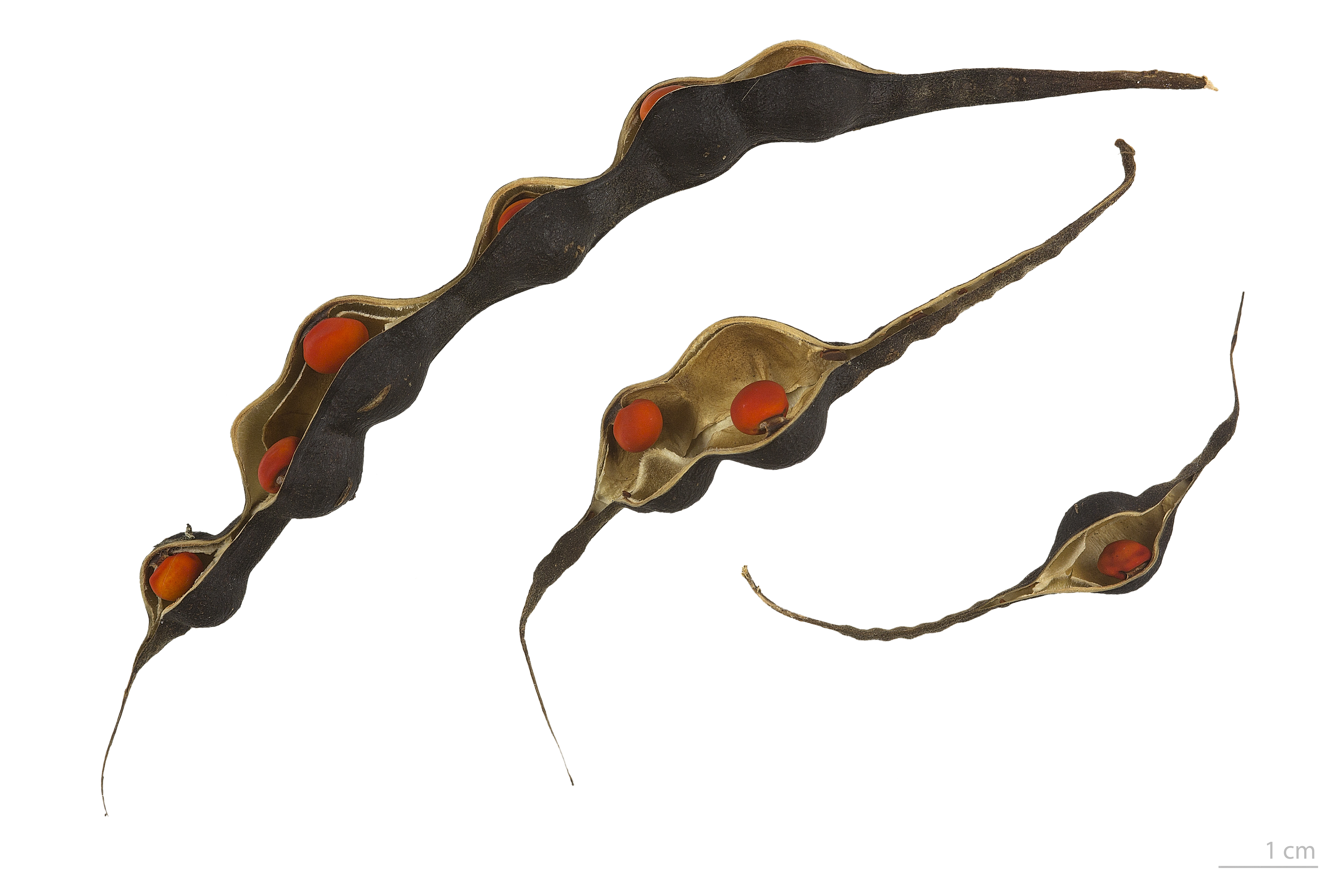
seed pods - MHNT

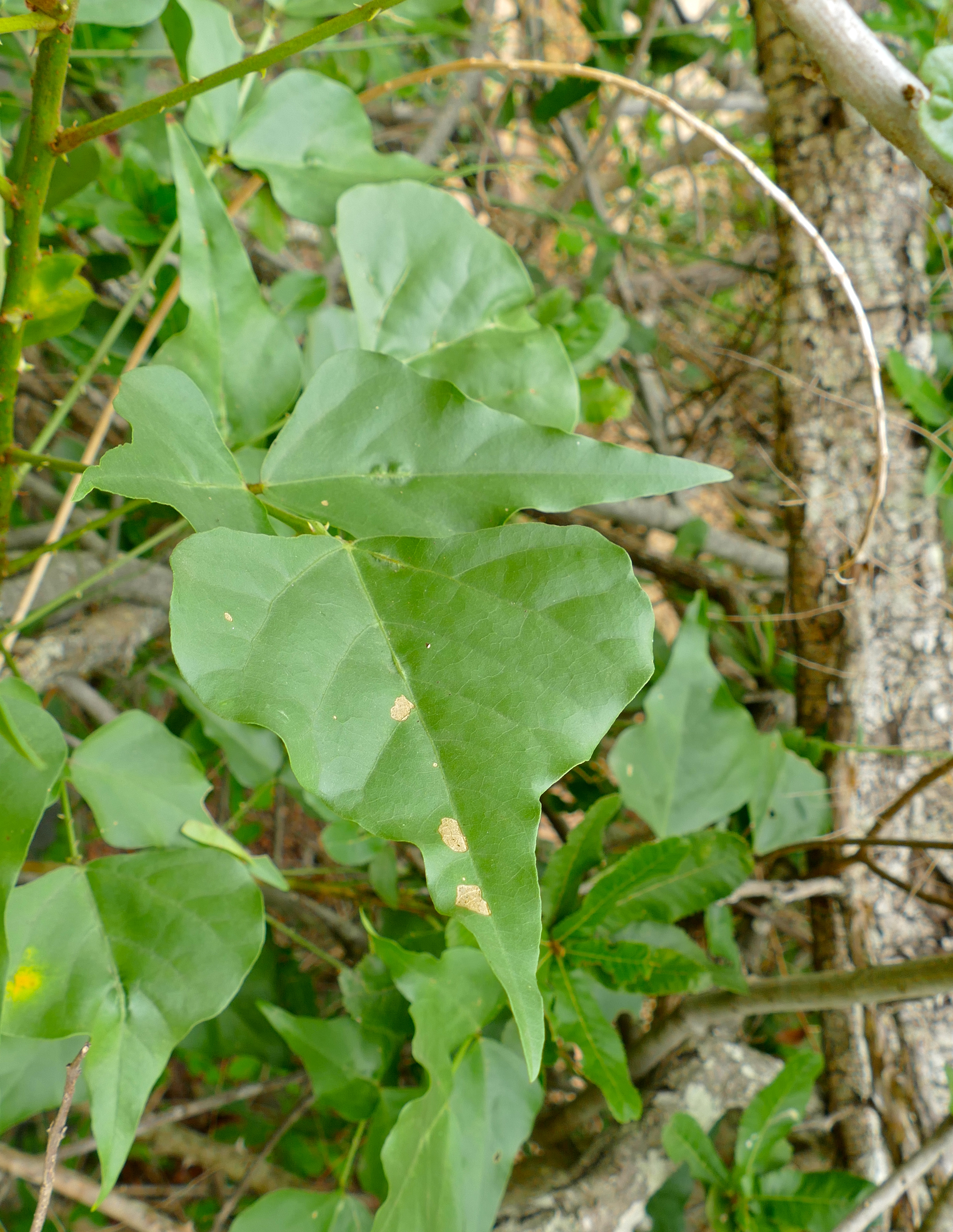
leaves
