= Zardini =

Zardini is an Italian surname. Notable people with the surname include:

- Elsa Matilde Zardini (1949–2020), Paraguayan/Argentinian botanist
- Edoardo Zardini (alpine skier) (born 1976), an Italian alpine skier
- Edoardo Zardini (cyclist) (born 1989), an Italian cyclist
- Ernesto Zardini (1908-1934), Italian ski jumper
- Mirko Zardini (born 1955), Italian curator
- Sergio Zardini (1931–1966), Italian bobsledder
