= Herter =

Herter is a German occupational surname for a herdsman. Notable people with the surname include:

- Albert Herter (1871–1950), American painter
- Christian Herter (1895–1966), American politician, son of Albert
- Christian Archibald Herter (physician) (1865–1910), American physician
- David Herter, American author
- Ernst Herter (1846–1917), German sculptor
- George Leonard Herter (1911–1994), American manager of Herter's Inc. sporting goods business and author
- Gérard Herter (1920–2007), German actor
- Hans Herter (1899–1984), German philologist
- Marc Herter (born 1974), German politician (SPD)
- Theophilus Herter (1913–1987), American Anglican bishop
- Wilhelm Gustav Franz Herter (1884−1958), German botanist

== See also ==
- Herter Brothers: Gustav (1830–1898) and Christian Herter (1839–1883), American furniture makers
