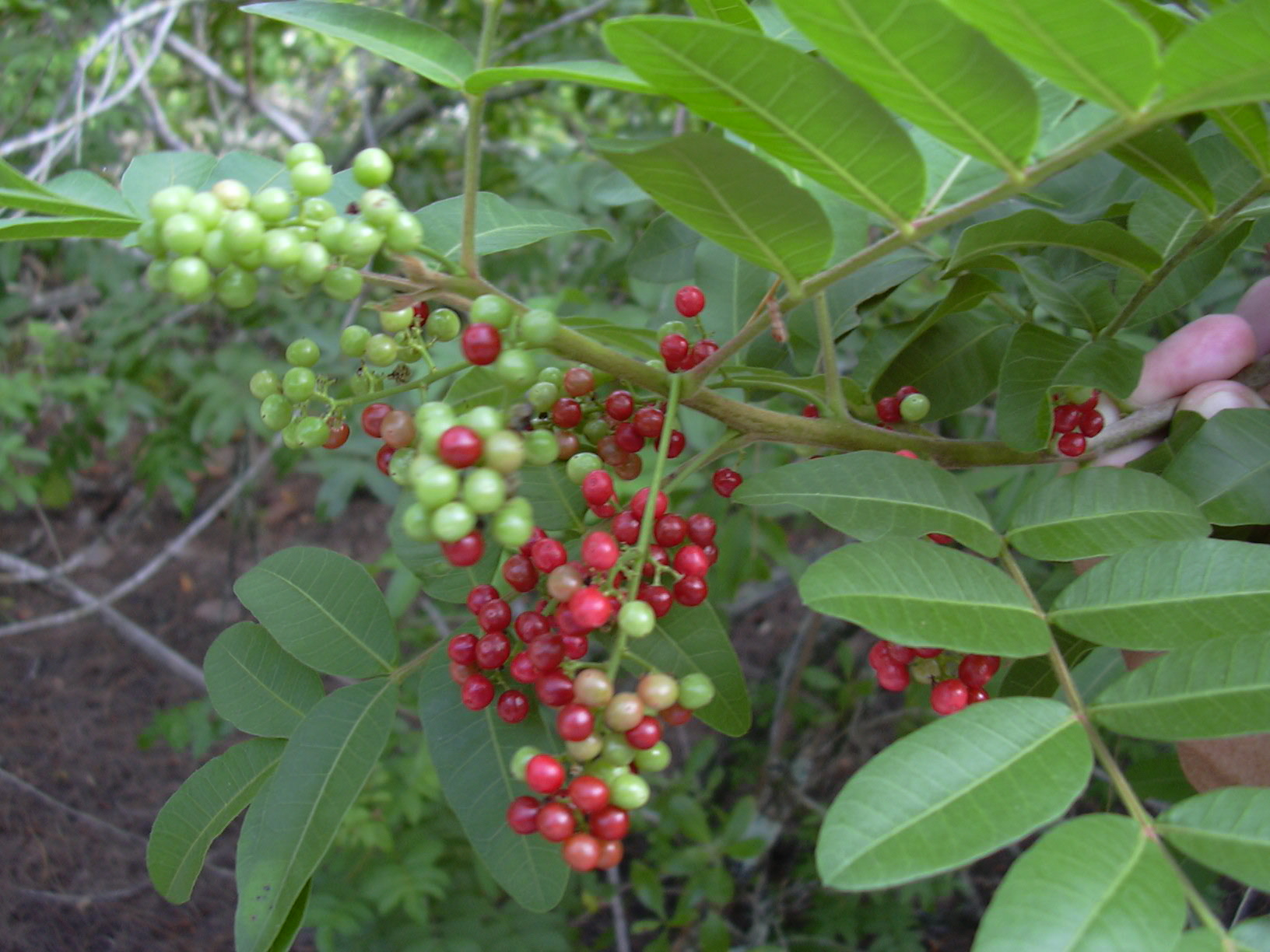
- Schinus terebinthifolia

Scientific classification
- Kingdom: Plantae
- Clade: Tracheophytes
- Clade: Angiosperms
- Clade: Eudicots
- Clade: Rosids
- Order: Sapindales
- Family: Anacardiaceae
- Subfamily: Anacardioideae
- Genus: Schinus; L. (1753)

Type species
- Schinus molle L.

Species
- See text

Synonyms
- Duvaua Kunth (1824); Molle Mill. (1754); Piperodendron Heist. ex Fabr. (1759); Sarcotheca Turcz. (1858) nom. illeg.; Schinos St.-Lag.(1880)

= Schinus =

Genus of shrubs and trees

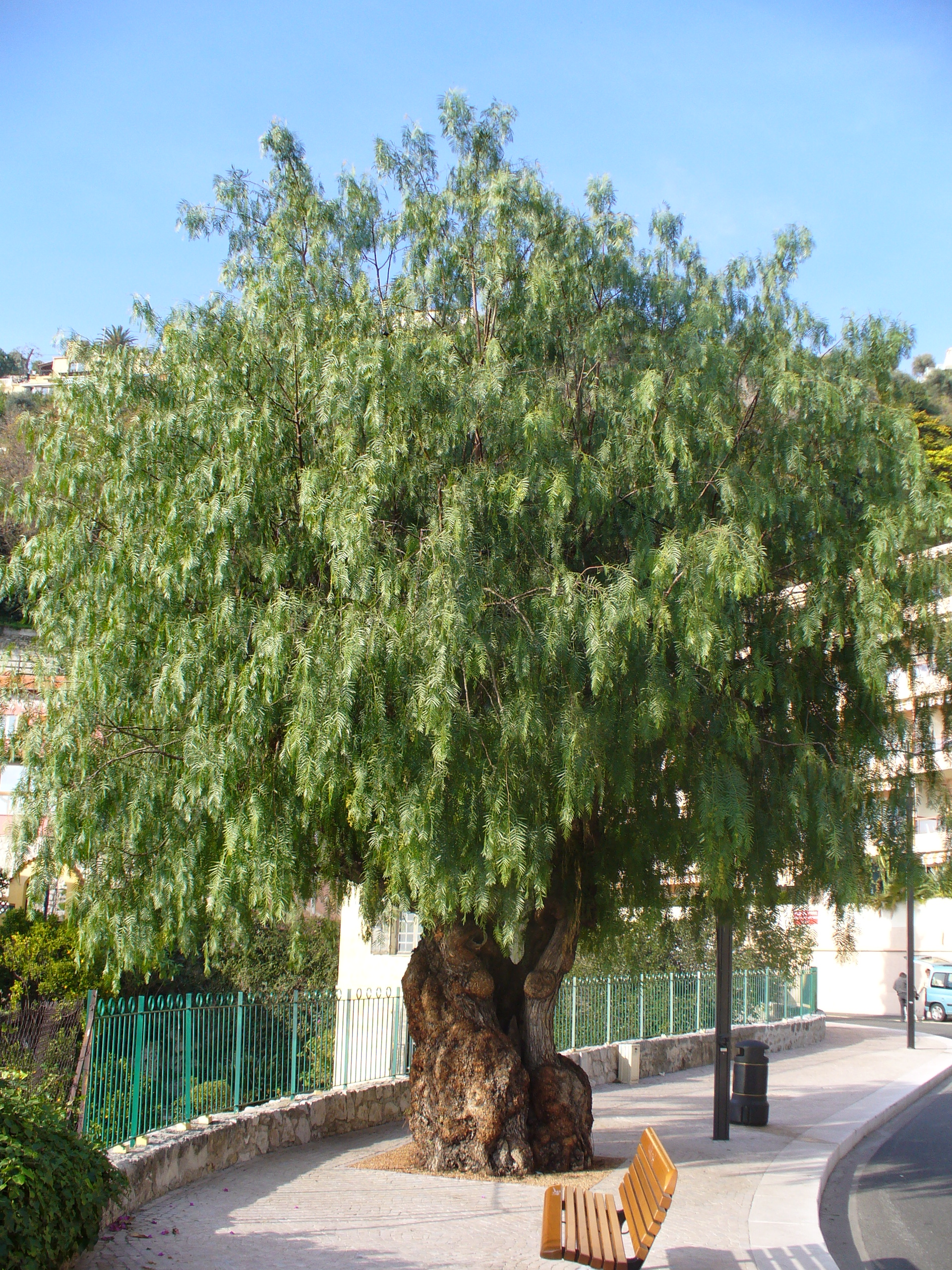
Schinus molle

Schinus is a genus of flowering trees and tall shrubs in the sumac family, Anacardiaceae. Members of the genus are commonly known as pepper trees. The Peruvian pepper tree (Schinus molle) is the source of the spice known as pink peppercorn.

The species of Schinus are native to South America, ranging from Peru and northeastern Brazil to southern South America. Some species (e.g. Schinus terebinthifolia) have become an invasive species outside their natural habitats. Schinus polygama, although less well known, is also potentially weedy in mesic areas.

== Etymology ==
The generic name is derived from the Greek word for Pistacia lentiscus, Σχίνος (schinos), which it resembles.

There has been considerable historical confusion as to the correct grammatical gender of the genus name; this was resolved in 2015 with the determination that the correct gender of Schinus is feminine, not masculine, and adjectival names within the genus must be spelled accordingly. E.g. Schinus polygamus is found in the literature, but Schinus polygama is deemed to be the correct form. This is because botanical tradition uses feminine gender for the genus name Schinus, as is the classical tradition for most genus names of trees that end in -us, and polygama is an adjective that must take a feminine form (not the masculine form polygamus).

== Species ==
34 species are currently accepted:

- Schinus areira L. – Peru, Bolivia, northern Chile, and northern Argentina
- Schinus bumelioides I.M.Johnst. – northern Argentina
- Schinus engleri F.A.Barkley – Argentina, Brazil, and Uruguay
- Schinus fasciculata (Griseb.) I.M.Johnst. – Bolivia, Paraguay, and northern Argentina
- Schinus ferox Hassl. – southern Brazil, Paraguay, Uruguay, northern Argentina (Misiones Province)
- Schinus gracilipes I.M.Johnst. – northwestern Argentina
- Schinus johnstonii F.A.Barkley – Argentina and Uruguay
- Schinus kauselii F.A.Barkley – central Chile
- Schinus latifolia (Gillies ex Lindl.) Engl. – central Chile
- Schinus lentiscifolia Marchand – southern Brazil, Paraguay, Uruguay, northern Argentina (Misiones Province)
- Schinus longifolia (Lindl.) Speg. – west-central and southern Brazil, Paraguay, Uruguay, nand northern Argentina
- Schinus marchandii F.A.Barkley – southern Chile and southern Argentina
- Schinus meyeri F.A.Barkley – Bolivia and northwestern Argentina (Salta Province)
- Schinus microphylla I.M.Johnst. – Peru and Bolivia
- Schinus molle L. Peruvian pepper tree
  - Schinus molle var. molle (=S. bituminosa, S. occidentalis) – Peru, Bolivia and northern Chile; southern Brazil, Paraguay, Uruguay, and northeastern Argentina
  - Schinus molle var. rusbyi (L.) DC. – southern Peru, Bolivia and northern Chile
- Schinus montana Engl. – central Chile
- Schinus myrtifolia (Griseb.) Cabrera – Bolivia and northwestern Argentina
- Schinus odonellii F.A.Barkley – southern Chile and western Argentina
- Schinus pampeana Bordignon & Vog.Ely – southern Brazil (Rio Grande do Sul)
- Schinus patagonica (Phil.) I.M.Johnst. ex Cabrera – central and southern Chile and western Argentina
- Schinus pearcei Engler – Bolivia, northern Chile, and Peru
- Schinus pilifera I.M.Johnst. – Bolivia and northern Argentina
- Schinus polygama (Cav.) Cabrera (=S. dentata, S. dependens) – Chile and northwestern Argentina (Mendoza)
- Schinus praecox (Griseb.) Speg. – north-central Argentina
- Schinus ramboi F.A.Barkley – southern and southeastern Brazil
- Schinus roigii Ruíz Leal & Cabrera – western Argentina
- Schinus sinuata (Griseb.) Engl. – northeastern Argentina
- Schinus spinosa Engl. – Brazil (Paraná state)
- Schinus talampaya Fabbroni & M.A.Zapater – northwestern Argentina (San Juan and La Rioja)
- Schinus terebinthifolia Raddi Brazilian pepper tree – northeastern to southeastern Brazil, northeastern Argentina, and Paraguay
  - Schinus terebinthifolia var. acutifolia Engl.
  - Schinus terebinthifolia var. terebinthifolia (=S. aroiera, S. chichita, S. mellisii, S, mucronulata, S. rhoifolia)
- Schinus uruguayensis (F.A.Barkley) Silva-Luz – southern Brazil, Uruguay, and northeastern Argentina
- Schinus velutina (Turcz.) I.M.Johnst. – central Chile
- Schinus venturii F.A.Barkley – southern Bolivia to northwestern Argentina (Salta)
- Schinus weinmanniifolia Mart. ex Engl. – south-central to eastern and southern Brazil, Paraguay, Uruguay, and northeastern Argentina

=== Formerly placed here ===
- Cuscuta myricoides (L.) Druce (as S. myricoides L.)
- Limonia acidissima L. (as S. limonia L.)
- Lithraea molleoides (Vell.) Engl. (as S. molleoides Vell.)
- Zanthoxylum fagara (L.) Sarg. (as S. fagara L.)
