= Laimosemion breviceps =

Scientific classification
- Kingdom: Animalia
- Phylum: Chordata
- Class: Actinopterygii
- Order: Cyprinodontiformes
- Family: Rivulidae
- Genus: Laimosemion
- Species: L. breviceps

Binomial name
- Laimosemion breviceps (C. H. Eigenmann, 1909)

Species of fish

Laimosemion breviceps is a species of killifish in the family Rivulidae, native to South America.

== Location ==
It is native to South America.

== Size ==
This species reaches a length of 3.5 cm (1.4 in).

== Etymology ==
The fishes name in Latin = brevis means short; ceps means head, The fish is “Distinguished by its short head” compared to presumed Guyanan congeners in Rivulus.
