= Aphyolebias =

Scientific classification
- Kingdom: Animalia
- Phylum: Chordata
- Class: Actinopterygii
- Order: Cyprinodontiformes
- Family: Rivulidae
- Genus: Aphyolebias; Costa, 1998

Type species
- Pterolebias peruensis Myers, 1954

Genus of fishes

Aphyolebias is a genus of New World killifish from the family Rivulidae. Although this genus is recognised by Fishbase In 1998, it was suggested that several species from the genus Moema be moved to the new Aphyolebias. Genetic research has indicated that Moema is paraphyletic and monophyly is only established when it is merged with the genus Aphyolebias. The Catalog of Fishes records Aphyolebias as a synonym of Moema.

== Species ==
The following species are classified as being in Aphyolebias:

- Aphyolebias boticarioi Costa, 2004
- Aphyolebias claudiae Costa, 2003
- Aphyolebias manuensis Costa, 2003
- Aphyolebias obliquus (Costa, Sarimento & Barrera, 1996)
- Aphyolebias peruensis (Myers, 1954) (Peruvian longfin)
- Aphyolebias rubrocaudatus (Seegers, 1984)
- Aphyolebias schleseri Costa, 2003
- Aphyolebias wischmanni (Seegers, 1983)
