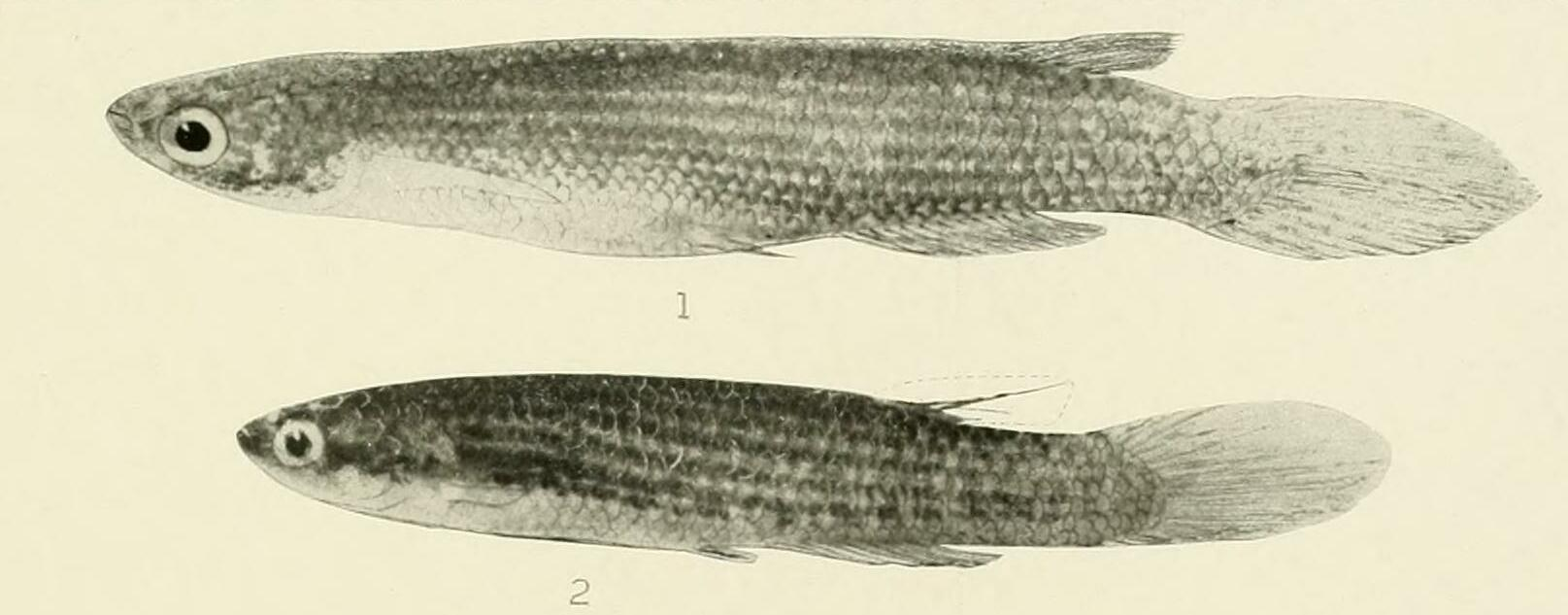
- Anablepsoides lanceolatus, top

Scientific classification
- Kingdom: Animalia
- Phylum: Chordata
- Class: Actinopterygii
- Order: Cyprinodontiformes
- Family: Rivulidae
- Genus: Anablepsoides; Huber, 1992

Type species
- Rivulus atratus Garman, 1895

Synonyms
- Benirivulus Costa, 2006; Oditichthys Huber, 1999

= Anablepsoides =

Genus of fishes

Anablepsoides is a genus of killifish in the family Rivulidae native to tropical South America and the Lesser Antilles. The majority are from the Amazon and Orinoco basins, as well as freshwater systems in the Guiana Shield, but a few species are from northern Venezuela, northeastern Brazil (Tocantins River basin, as well as systems in Ceará and Maranhão) and the Lesser Antilles (Trinidad and Tobago, Grenada, Martinique and Margarita). Although largely restricted to lowlands, a few species occur in the lower East Andean foothills. They are mostly found in shallow fresh water swamps, streams, edges of rivers, ponds and pools, but a few may occur in brackish estuaries. They are able to jump over land and breathe air for short periods, allowing them to access isolated waters inhabited by few or no other fish. Several Anablepsoides species have small distributions and some are seriously threatened by habitat loss; the entire known range of A. xinguensis is in the area flooded by the Belo Monte Dam.

Similar to closely related genera such as Atlantirivulus, Cynodonichthys, Laimosemion and Melanorivulus, Anablepsoides are non-annual killifish.

The largest, A. igneus, is up to 15 cm (5.9 in) in total length, but the vast majority of the Anablepsoides species only reach about half that size or less.

== Species ==
Until 2011, Anablepsoides were included in Rivulus, and some prefer to maintain them in that genus.

If recognized as a valid genus, there are currently 62 species in Anablepsoides:

- Anablepsoides adrianae (Vermeulen, 2022)
- Anablepsoides amanan (W. J. E. M. Costa & Lazzarotto, 2008)
- Anablepsoides amphoreus (Huber, 1979)
- Anablepsoides atratus (Garman, 1895)
- Anablepsoides bahianus (Huber, 1990)
- Anablepsoides beniensis (G. S. Myers, 1927)
- Anablepsoides bibosi Valdesalici & Gil, 2019
- Anablepsoides cajariensis (W. J. E. M. Costa & de Luca, 2011)
- Anablepsoides caurae (Radda, 2004)
- Anablepsoides cearensis (W. J. E. M. Costa & Vono, 2009)
- Anablepsoides chapare Valdesalici (sv) & García-Gil, 2017
- Anablepsoides christinae (Huber, 1992)
- Anablepsoides collieri (Huber, 2021)
- Anablepsoides corpulentus (Thomerson & Taphorn, 1993)
- Anablepsoides cryptocallus (Seegers, 1980)
- Anablepsoides deltaphilus (Seegers, 1983)
- Anablepsoides derhami (Fels & Huber, 1985)
- Anablepsoides elongatus (Fels & de Rham, 1981)
- Anablepsoides erberi (Berkenkamp, 1989)
- Anablepsoides falconi D. T. B. Nielsen, Hoetmer & Vandenkerkhove 2022
- Anablepsoides fransvermeuleni Valdesalici (sv), 2015
- Anablepsoides gamae W. J. E. M. Costa, Bragança & Amorim, 2013
- Anablepsoides gaucheri (Keith, Nandrin & Le Bail, 2006)
- Anablepsoides hartii (Boulenger, 1890)
- Anablepsoides henschelae W. J. E. M. Costa, Bragança & Amorim, 2013
- Anablepsoides hoetmeri D. T. B. Nielsen, Baptista & van der Berg, 2016
- Anablepsoides holmiae (C. H. Eigenmann, 1909)
- Anablepsoides igneus (Huber, 1991)
- Anablepsoides immaculatus (Thomerson, Nico & Taphorn, 1991)
- Anablepsoides intermittens (Fels & de Rham, 1981)
- Anablepsoides iridescens (Fels & de Rham, 1981)
- Anablepsoides jari W. J. E. M. Costa, Bragança & Amorim, 2013
- Anablepsoides jucundus (Huber, 1992)
- Anablepsoides katukina D. T. B. Nielsen, Hoetmer & Vandenkerkhove, 2022
- Anablepsoides lanceolatus (C. H. Eigenmann, 1909)
- Anablepsoides limoncochae (Hoedeman, 1962)
- Anablepsoides lineasoppilatae Valdesalici (sv) & I. Schindler, 2013
- Anablepsoides luitalimae D. T. B. Nielsen, 2016
- Anablepsoides lungi (Berkenkamp, 1984)
- Anablepsoides mazaruni (G. S. Myers, 1924)
- Anablepsoides mejiai (Vermeulen, 2020)
- Anablepsoides micropus (Steindachner, 1863)
- Anablepsoides monticola (Staeck & I. Schindler, 1997)
- Anablepsoides ophiomimus (Huber, 1992)
- Anablepsoides ornatus (Garman, 1895)
- Anablepsoides ottonii W. J. E. M. Costa, Bragança & Amorim, 2013
- Anablepsoides parlettei (Valdesalici (sv) & I. Schindler, 2011)
- Anablepsoides peruanus (Regan, 1903)
- Anablepsoides roraima W. J. E. M. Costa, Bragança & Amorim, 2013
- Anablepsoides rubrolineatus (Fels & de Rham, 1981)
- Anablepsoides speciosus (Fels & de Rham, 1981)
- Anablepsoides stagnatus (C. H. Eigenmann, 1909)
- Anablepsoides taeniatus (Fowler, 1945)
- Anablepsoides tessellatus (Huber, 1992)
- Anablepsoides tocantinensis (W. J. E. M. Costa, 2010)
- Anablepsoides urophthalmus (Günther, 1866)
- Anablepsoides urubuiensis W. J. E. M. Costa, 2013
- Anablepsoides vieirai D. T. B. Nielsen, 2016
- Anablepsoides waimacui (C. H. Eigenmann, 1909)
- Anablepsoides xanthonotus (C. G. E. Ahl, 1926)
- Anablepsoides xinguensis (W. J. E. M. Costa, 2010)

Synonyms

- Anablepsoides bondi (L. P. Schultz, 1949); valid as A. hartii
