= Atlantirivulus =

Scientific classification
- Kingdom: Animalia
- Phylum: Chordata
- Class: Actinopterygii
- Order: Cyprinodontiformes
- Family: Rivulidae
- Genus: Atlantirivulus; W. J. E. M. Costa, 2008

Type species
- Rivulus santensis Köhler, 1906

Genus of fishes

Atlantirivulus is a genus of fishes in the family Rivulidae. They are endemic to shallow swamps, creeks, streams and pools in the Atlantic Forest in southeastern Brazil, ranging from Rio de Janeiro to Santa Catarina. Several of the species are highly threatened, while others survive in well-protected reserves. A. janeiroensis was initially feared extinct, but has since been rediscovered in two reserves.

Similar to closely related genera such as Anablepsoides, Cynodonichthys, Laimosemion and Melanorivulus, Atlantirivulus are non-annual killifish.

They are small fish, no more than 6.5 cm (2.6 in) in total length. Compared to many species in the family, the colors of Atlantirivulus are relatively dull.

== Species ==
Until 2011, Atlantirivulus were included in Rivulus, and some prefer to maintain them in that genus.

If recognized as a valid genus, there are currently 16 species in Atlantirivulus:

- Atlantirivulus depressus W. J. E. M. Costa, 1991
- Atlantirivulus enigmaticus Volcan, Suárez, Severo-Neto, Amorim & Costa, 2024
- Atlantirivulus guanabarensis W. J. E. M. Costa, 2014
- Atlantirivulus haraldsiolii Berkenkamp, 1984
- Atlantirivulus janeiroensis W. J. E. M. Costa, 1991
- Atlantirivulus jurubatibensis W. J. E. M. Costa, 2008
- Atlantirivulus lazzarotoi W. J. E. M. Costa, 2007
- Atlantirivulus luelingi Seegers, 1984
- Atlantirivulus maricensis W. J. E. M. Costa, 2014
- Atlantirivulus nudiventris W. J. E. M. Costa & G. C. Brasil, 1991
- Atlantirivulus paranaguensis W. J. E. M. Costa, 2014
- Atlantirivulus ribeirensis W. J. E. M. Costa, 2014
- Atlantirivulus riograndensis W. J. E. M. Costa & Lanés, 2009
- Atlantirivulus santensis Köhler, 1906
- Atlantirivulus simplicis W. J. E. M. Costa, 2004
- Atlantirivulus unaensis W. J. E. M. Costa & De Luca, 2009
