= Winner and loser effects =

Aggression phenomenon observed in animals

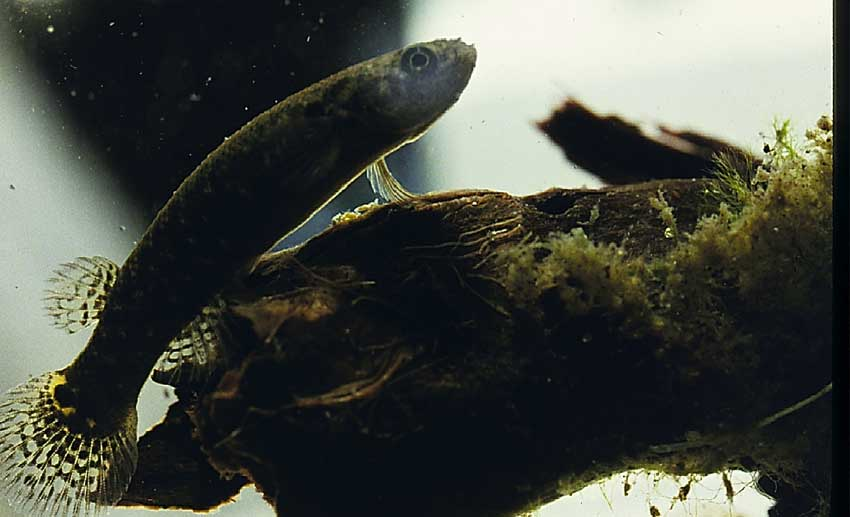
A fish from the genus Rivulus

The winner and loser effect is an aggression phenomenon in which the winner effect is the increased probability that an animal will win future aggressive interactions after experiencing previous wins, while the loser effect is the increased probability that an animal will lose future aggressive interactions after experiencing previous losses. Overall these effects can either increase or decrease an animal's aggressive behaviour, depending on what effect affects the species of concern. Animals such as Agkistrodon contortrix, Rivulus marmoratus, and Sula nebouxii show either both or one of these effects.

The outcomes of winner and loser effects help develop and structure hierarchies in nature and is used to support the game theory model of aggression.

== Causation ==
A theory underlying the causation of the winner and loser effect deals with an animals perception on its own and other members resource holding potential. Essentially, if an animal perceives that it has a high resource holding potential, it considers itself to be a dominant member of an intraspecific community. If an animal perceives that it has a low resource holding potential, it considers itself to be a less dominant member. This perception of resource holding potential is further enhanced or disrupted when aggressive challenges arise. If an animal wins an encounter, its perception of its own resource holding potential increases, just as if an animal loses, its perception of its resource holding potential decreases. Animals, regardless of size, with a higher perception of resource holding potential are more likely to initiate aggressive behaviour to maintain their dominance within a community. Overall, the larger the difference between the perception of two fighting animals resource holding potential, the higher the chance of the animal with the higher resource holding potential of winning the encounter. Based on this theory, an animal who assumes itself as a high resource holding individual is likely to be a dominant/aggressive member while an animal who assumes itself as a low resource holding individual is likely to be a submissive/non-aggressive member of a community.

The reason an animal will accept its dominant or submissive position in a hierarchy is because of the game theory model of aggression. Based on the hawk and dove game, being a hawk (aggressive individual) or dove (submissive individual) can be beneficial depending on the fitness associated with the trait. Game theory discusses a frequency-dependent model where both traits (aggressive vs submissive) can exist when the frequency of each meets an evolutionary stable strategy (ESS).

== Hormonal stimulation ==
In some animals winner and loser effects have been shown to cause hormonal differences in blood plasma. Hormones like corticosterone are found to be higher in animals experiencing loser effects than those experiencing winner effects. Corticosterone is a stress hormone and is likely raised due to the implications of a loss in animals experiencing the loser effect. Some researchers even suggest that this increased level of corticosterone caused by the loser effect inhibits regions of the brain involved in learning and memory, but no formal literature has supported the hypothesis that winner and loser effects directly cause this. An example of this increase in corticosterone following a loss is seen in the copperhead snakes.

Testosterone is another compound whose concentration within the body are affected by winner and loser effects. Research conducted using humans show that after completing a competitive task against another team, the winning team's testosterone goes up, while the losing team's testosterone goes down. It also showed in a group setting that the team member who was the top-scoring player or did the most work received the highest boost in testosterone.

== Importance of previous experience ==
Winner and loser effects are driven by an organism's previous experiences, typically in an aggressive context. The most recent fighting experience has the greatest effect on the organism, as testing done on Rivulus marmoratus showed individuals who had lost their most recent encounters (LW) had a higher probability of winning their next encounter than that of a fish who had lost their last encounter but won the one before that (WL). The literature also showed that encounters that happened two times before an aggressive event can affect the strength of the winner or loser effect. This was shown as species who won their last fight, but lost the one before that (LW), had a higher probability of winning their next fight than that of a fish that lost their last encounter but won the interaction before that (WL).

== Hierarchy formation ==
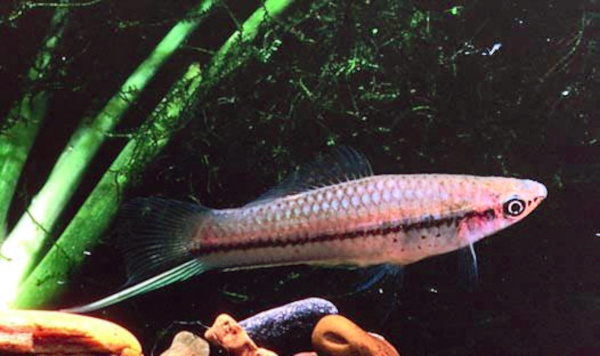
Xiphophorus helleri, also known as the Green Swordtail

Winner and loser effects also can be attributed to the formation of hierarchies. A study done on Xiphophorus helleri, also known as the green swordtail had shown that individuals who won were more likely to assume alpha or higher ranked positions in a hierarchy, while individuals who lost were more likely to assume omega or lower ranked positions in a hierarchy. Neutral individuals who have little to no experience with aggression interactions fall in an intermediate position between winners and losers forming the winner–neutral–loser (W–N–L) hierarchy.

Hierarchies can also be affected by the strength of the winner or loser effects acting upon it. Winner effects alone typically produce linear hierarchies where organism A wins all encounters, organism B wins all encounters except against organism A, organism C loses all encounters except against organism D, and organism D loses all encounters. This linear relationship is typically shown as (A > B > C > D). Loser effects unlike winner effects do not show this linear relationship because animals experiencing loser effects do not fight which makes it difficult to assign a position in a hierarchy.

== Examples ==
=== Loser effects in copperhead snakes ===
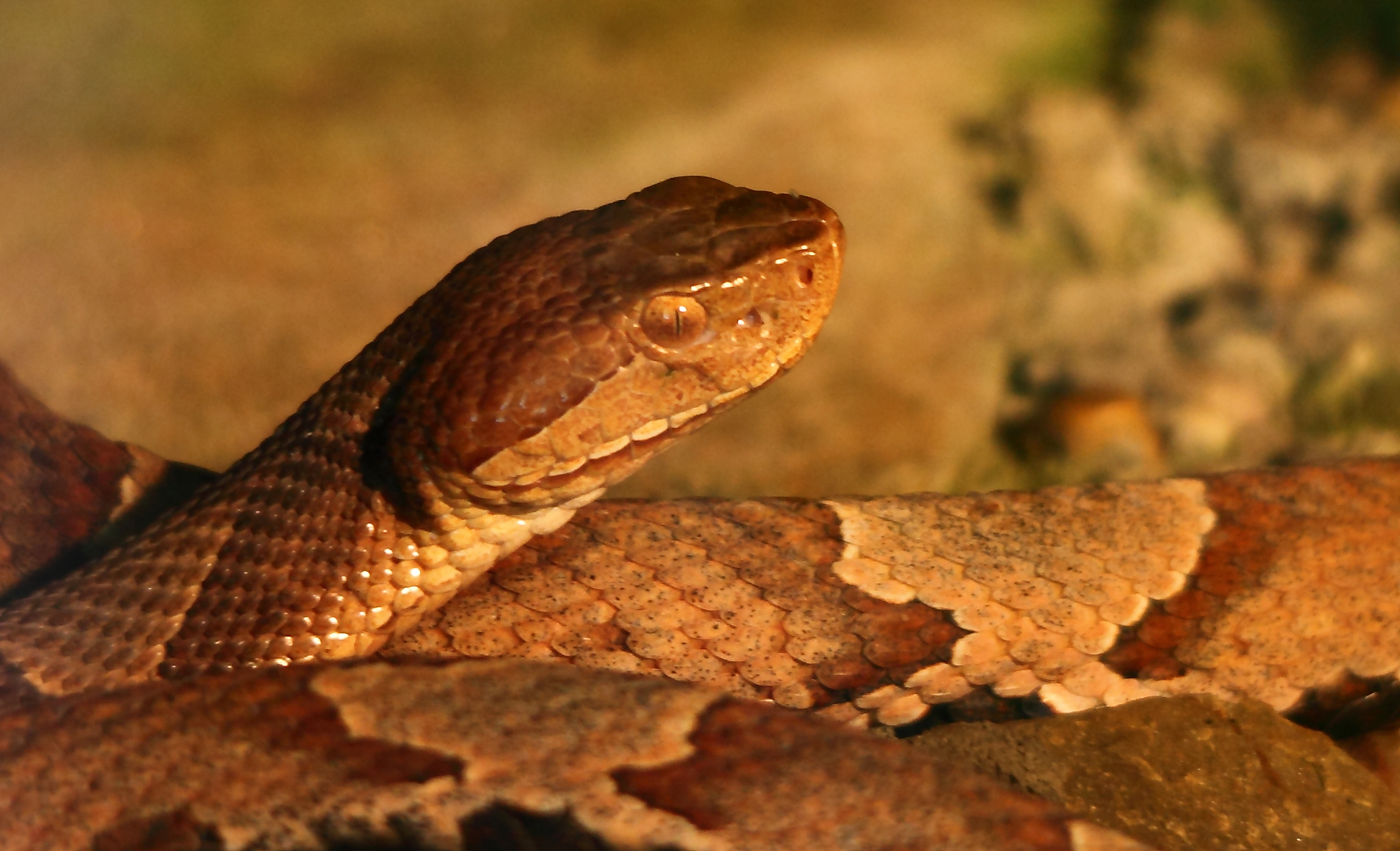
Agkistrodon contortrix, also known as the Copperhead Snake

Copperhead snakes rely on aggressive behaviours to fight for a prospective mate. Since aggressive behaviours in this species are selected for reproduction, winner and loser effects could have an effect on these aggressive behaviours and therefore the animals reproductive success. A male copperhead snake, who has not had an aggressive interaction in months, when put in a situation to fight for a female is likely to win an encounter on the basis that his body size is larger than that of the other fighter.

When copperhead snakes are tested to see if winner effects affect their ability to win an encounter it was found that there was no winner effect. This was attributed to winners to always accept challenges from other males (even if larger), and were found to be more excitable because of this. This indicated that previous experience in winners does not increase their ability to reproduce as they are just as likely to lose a fight if a snake of a larger size challenges them.

Copperhead snakes were also tested to see if loser effects were present. This was done by first placing two neutral snakes of about the same size in an arena, and then placing a one-time loser snake against a neutral snake so that the results could be compared. It was found that loser effects were present as snakes who had lost previous encounters were more likely to lose again. The losing effect in the copperhead snake is so strong that even in encounters where the loser snake was 10% larger, they would always lose if they had more than one previous loss.

=== Winner and loser effects in blue-footed boobies ===
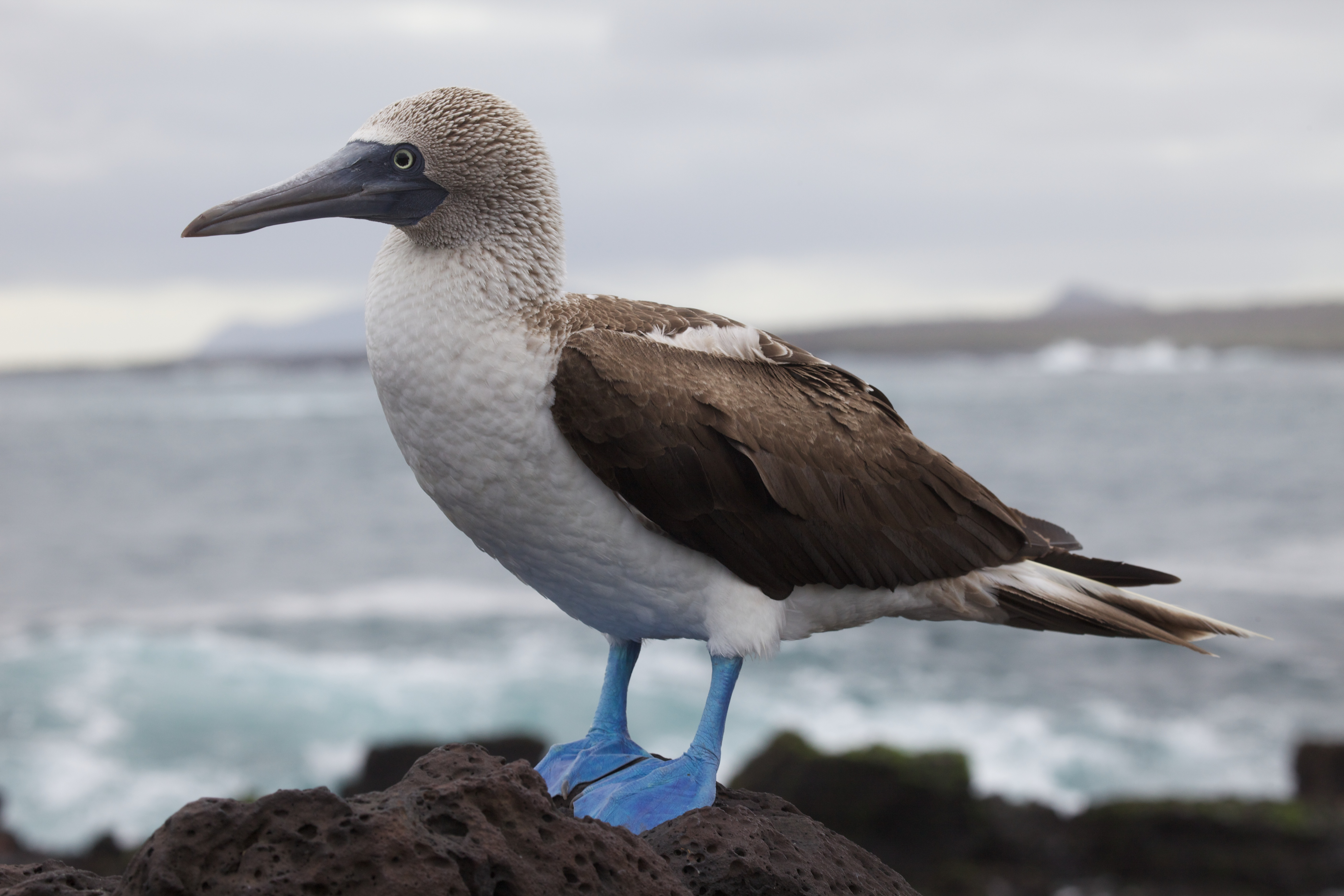
Sula nebouxii, also known as the blue-footed booby

Blue-footed boobies show a frequency-dependent dominant-submissive behavioural strategy. In these birds, the nestlings develop one of the following strategies, either dominant or submissive. If first born chicks showed aggression early on towards its siblings, it likely became a dominant member, while if the chick was non-aggressive early on, then it likely adopted the submissive strategy. Winner and loser effects are seen in this species due to the behavioural strategy.

Winner effects were shown when established dominant chicks were placed against non-experienced chicks in a study by Drummond. Dominant chicks were seen to be more likely to win an aggressive encounter with a non-experienced chick, even when the non-experienced chick was larger than the dominant chick. This was attributed to established dominant chicks being six times more aggressive than non-experienced chicks due to having previous wins.

Loser effects were shown when established submissive chicks were placed against non-experienced chicks in the same study by Drummond. Submissive chicks were seen to be less likely to win an aggressive encounter with a non-experienced chick, even when the non-experienced chick was smaller than the submissive chick. This was attributed to established submissive chicks being seven times less aggressive than non-experienced chicks due to having previous losses.

This experiment performed by Drummond was done for 10 days and showed that over the length of the study winner effects were less powerful over time, while the strength of loser effects remained constant.

=== Winner and loser effects in humans ===
Studies have also found evidence of winner effect in humans, typically using sport competitions. A study looking at tennis matches has found that a very close win or loss in a set has a substantial effect on the chance to win the next set. The study focused on situations where players end up winning or losing the first set by a very small margin (two points at the end of a tie-break lasting more than 20 points). It finds that the winner of the first set has 60% chances of winning the second set, compared to 40% for the loser of the first set. Such an effect is only observed for male players. Another study found that players winning in tennis experience an increase in testosterone level while losers experience a decrease. The famous hot-hand effect in basketball has also been found to exist: players who are successful at scoring during a match increase their likelihood to shoot successfully later on.

=== Winner and loser effects in plants ===
As humans disturb old-growth forests, they are creating more forest edges and gaps. The removal of these trees provide less shading and allow for more sunlight. Species that prefer the shaded environment may not be adapted to survive in the increased sunlight. Due to the increased sunlight, its possible for sunlight-adapted species to thrive in these area and out compete the shaded plants. In this event, the shaded plants are the losers, while the sunlight-adapted plants are the winners. There are significantly more plants that are losers than winners. While the rate of speciation increases in the winners, it is far outpaced by the extinction of the losers. The projected effects of plant loss on biodiversity loss are more significant than any other trophic level.

== See also ==
- Winner and loser culture, a similar concept applied to human sociology
