= Orthochromis mazimeroensis =

Conservation status
- Endangered (IUCN 3.1)

Scientific classification
- Kingdom: Animalia
- Phylum: Chordata
- Class: Actinopterygii
- Order: Cichliformes
- Family: Cichlidae
- Genus: Orthochromis
- Species: O. mazimeroensis

Binomial name
- Orthochromis mazimeroensis De Vos & Seegers, 1998

Species of fish

Orthochromis mazimeroensis is a species of cichlid endemic to Burundi where it is only known from the Mazimero River and the Nganga River. This species can reach a length of 7.2 centimetres (2.8 in) SL.
