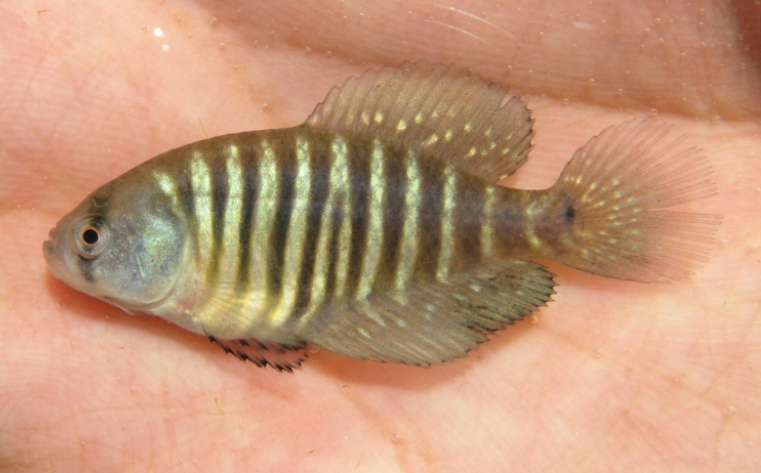

Scientific classification
- Kingdom: Animalia
- Phylum: Chordata
- Class: Actinopterygii
- Order: Cyprinodontiformes
- Family: Rivulidae
- Genus: Austrolebias
- Species: A. charrua

Binomial name
- Austrolebias charrua Costa & Cheffe, 2001
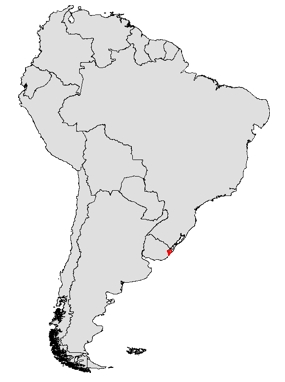
- Distribution of Austrolebias charrua (red)

= Austrolebias charrua =

Species of fish

Austrolebias charrua is a species of killifish from the family Rivulidae. It is endemic to the basin of the Lagoa dos Patos in southern Brazil. This species was described in 2001 with the type locality given as a temporary pool near Chuí and Santa Vitória do Palmar in Rio Grande do Sul. The specific name refers to the Charrúa an indigenous people who lived in Rio Grande do Sul, as well as neighbouring parts of Argentina and Uruguay.
