= Anablepsoides parlettei =

Conservation status
- Vulnerable (IUCN 3.1)

Scientific classification
- Kingdom: Animalia
- Phylum: Chordata
- Class: Actinopterygii
- Order: Cyprinodontiformes
- Family: Rivulidae
- Genus: Anablepsoides
- Species: A. parlettei

Binomial name
- Anablepsoides parlettei (Valdesalici & I. Schindler, 2011)

Synonyms
- Rivulus parlettei Valdesalici & Schindler, 2011

Species of fish

Anablepsoides parlettei is a species of freshwater fish.

== Etymology ==
The fish is named after American sculptor and jewelry maker Casey Parlette, who discovered this fish species while he was living in Peru. He co-collected the type specimen. He later launched a jewelry line named “parlettei jewelry” after this “colorful little fish”.

== Distribution ==
Anablepsoides parlettei is only known from its type locality, south eastern Peru.
