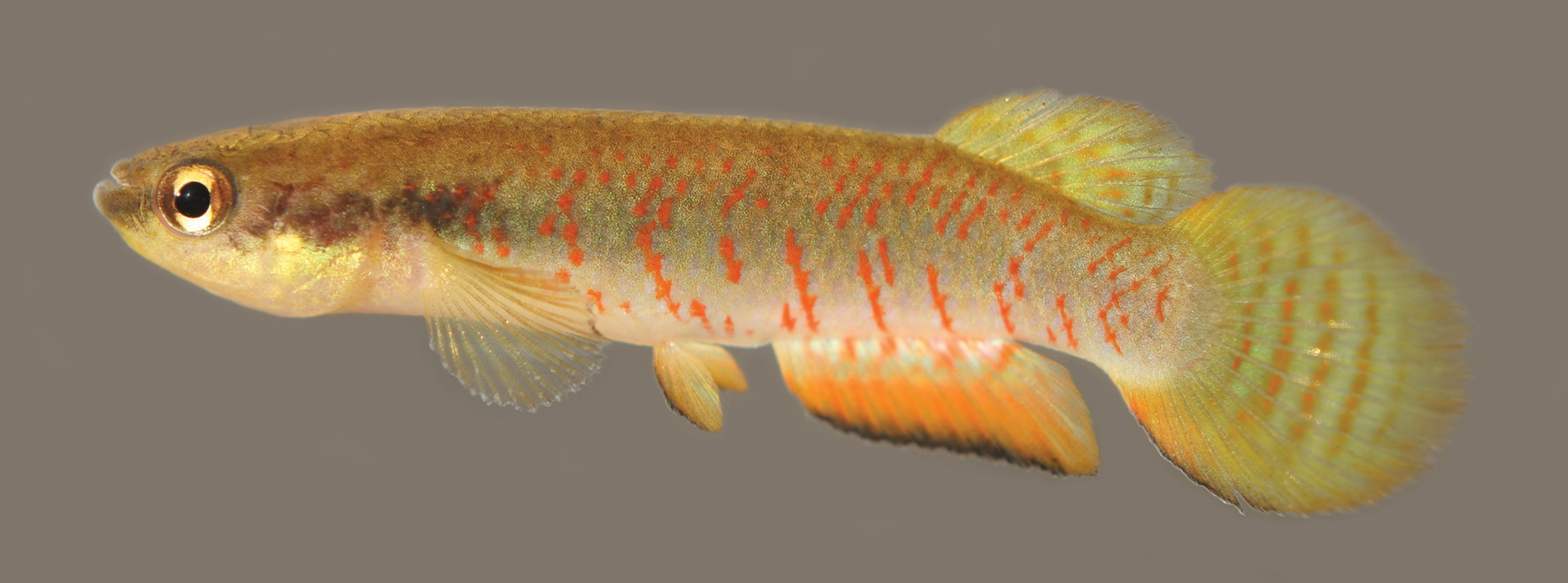
- Melanorivulus nigromarginatus

Scientific classification
- Kingdom: Animalia
- Phylum: Chordata
- Class: Actinopterygii
- Order: Cyprinodontiformes
- Family: Rivulidae
- Genus: Melanorivulus; W. J. E. M. Costa, 2006

Type species
- Rivulus punctatus Boulenger, 1895

= Melanorivulus =

Genus of fishes

Melanorivulus is a genus of South American freshwater fishes in the family Rivulidae. Most species are endemic to the Río de la Plata, eastern Amazon (west to Tapajós basin), Tocantins–Araguaia and São Francisco basins in Brazil, but a few members of this genus range west into Bolivia, south into Paraguay and Argentina, and east to Parnaíba and Sergipe in northeastern Brazil. Only M. schuncki occurs north of the Amazon River. They inhabit shallow waters, generally 5–30 cm (2–12 in) deep, at the margins of streams in open or fairly open habitats like the Cerrado or Cerrado–Amazon transition. Many have tiny ranges and are seriously threatened.

Similar to closely related genera such as Anablepsoides, Atlantirivulus, Cynodonichthys and Laimosemion, Melanorivulus are jumpers and non-annual killifish.

Melanorivulus are small fish, with the largest species up 5 cm (2.0 in) in total length and the smallest less than 2 cm (0.8 in). They are often quite colorful and some are kept in aquariums.

== Species ==
Until 2011, Melanorivulus were included in Rivulus, and some prefer to maintain them in that genus.

If recognized as a valid genus, there are currently 60 species in Melanorivulus:

- Melanorivulus amambaiensis Volcan, Severo-Neto & Lanés, 2018
- Melanorivulus apiamici (W. J. E. M. Costa, 1989)
- Melanorivulus atlanticus W. J. E. M. Costa, Bragança & Ottoni, 2015
- Melanorivulus bororo (W. J. E. M. Costa, 2008)
- Melanorivulus britzkei Nielsen, 2017
- Melanorivulus canesi Nielsen, 2017
- Melanorivulus crixas (W. J. E. M. Costa, 2007)
- Melanorivulus cyanopterus (W. J. E. M. Costa, 2005)
- Melanorivulus dapazi (W. J. E. M. Costa, 2005)
- Melanorivulus decoratus (W. J. E. M. Costa, 1989)
- Melanorivulus egens (W. J. E. M. Costa, 2005)
- Melanorivulus faucireticulatus (W. J. E. M. Costa, 2008)
- Melanorivulus flavipinnis W. J. E. M. Costa, 2017
- Melanorivulus formosensis (W. J. E. M. Costa, 2008)
- Melanorivulus giarettai (W. J. E. M. Costa, 2008)
- Melanorivulus ignescens W. J. E. M. Costa, 2017
- Melanorivulus illuminatus (W. J. E. M. Costa, 2007)
- Melanorivulus imperatrizensis D. T. B. Nielsen & C. S. Pinto, 2015
- Melanorivulus interruptus Volcan, Severo-Neto & Lanés, 2018
- Melanorivulus ivinhemensis Volcan, Severo-Neto & Lanés, 2018
- Melanorivulus jalapensis (W. J. E. M. Costa, 2010)
- Melanorivulus javahe (W. J. E. M. Costa, 2007)
- Melanorivulus karaja (W. J. E. M. Costa, 2007)
- Melanorivulus kayabi (W. J. E. M. Costa, 2008)
- Melanorivulus kayapo (W. J. E. M. Costa, 2006)
- Melanorivulus kunzei W. J. E. M. Costa, 2012
- Melanorivulus leali W. J. E. M. Costa, 2013
- Melanorivulus linearis W. J. E. M. Costa, 2018
- Melanorivulus litteratus (W. J. E. M. Costa, 2005)
- Melanorivulus megaroni (W. J. E. M. Costa, 2010)
- Melanorivulus melanopterus Nielsen & Ohara, 2024
- Melanorivulus modestus (W. J. E. M. Costa, 1991)
- Melanorivulus nelsoni Volcan, Severo-Neto & Lanés, 2017
- Melanorivulus nigromarginatus W. J. E. M. Costa, 2018
- Melanorivulus nigropunctatus Volcan, Klotzel & Lanés, 2017
- Melanorivulus ofaie Volcan, Klotzel & Lanés, 2017
- Melanorivulus paracatuensis (W. J. E. M. Costa, 2003)
- Melanorivulus paresi (W. J. E. M. Costa, 2008)
- Melanorivulus parnaibensis (W. J. E. M. Costa, 2003)
- Melanorivulus petrisecundi W. J. E. M. Costa, 2016
- Melanorivulus pictus (W. J. E. M. Costa, 1989)
- Melanorivulus pindorama W. J. E. M. Costa, 2012
- Melanorivulus pinima (W. J. E. M. Costa, 1989)
- Melanorivulus planaltinus (W. J. E. M. Costa & Brasil, 2008)
- Melanorivulus polychromus D. T. B. Nielsen, P. A. B. A. Neves, Ywamoto & Passos, 2016
- Melanorivulus proximus W. J. E. M. Costa, 2018
- Melanorivulus punctatus (Boulenger, 1895)
- Melanorivulus regularis W. J. E. M. Costa, 2017
- Melanorivulus rossoi (W. J. E. M. Costa, 2005)
- Melanorivulus rubromarginatus (W. J. E. M. Costa, 2007)
- Melanorivulus rubroreticulatus W. J. E. M. Costa, Amorim & Bragança, 2014
- Melanorivulus rutilicaudus (W. J. E. M. Costa, 2005)
- Melanorivulus salmonicaudus (W. J. E. M. Costa, 2007)
- Melanorivulus scalaris (W. J. E. M. Costa, 2005)
- Melanorivulus schuncki (W. J. E. M. Costa & de Luca, 2011)
- Melanorivulus spixi W. J. E. M. Costa, 2016
- Melanorivulus terena Volcan, Severo-Neto & Lanés, 2024
- Melanorivulus ubirajarai W. J. E. M. Costa, 2012
- Melanorivulus violaceus (W. J. E. M. Costa, 1991)
- Melanorivulus vittatus (W. J. E. M. Costa, 1989)
- Melanorivulus wallacei W. J. E. M. Costa, 2016
- Melanorivulus zygonectes (G. S. Myers, 1927)
