= R. robustus =

R. robustus may refer to:

- Repenomamus robustus, a large mammal species known from the Cretaceous period of China
- Rotylenchus robustus, the Thorne's lance nematode, a plant pathogenic nematode species
- Rivulus robustus, the rivulus almirante, a fish species endemic to Mexico
