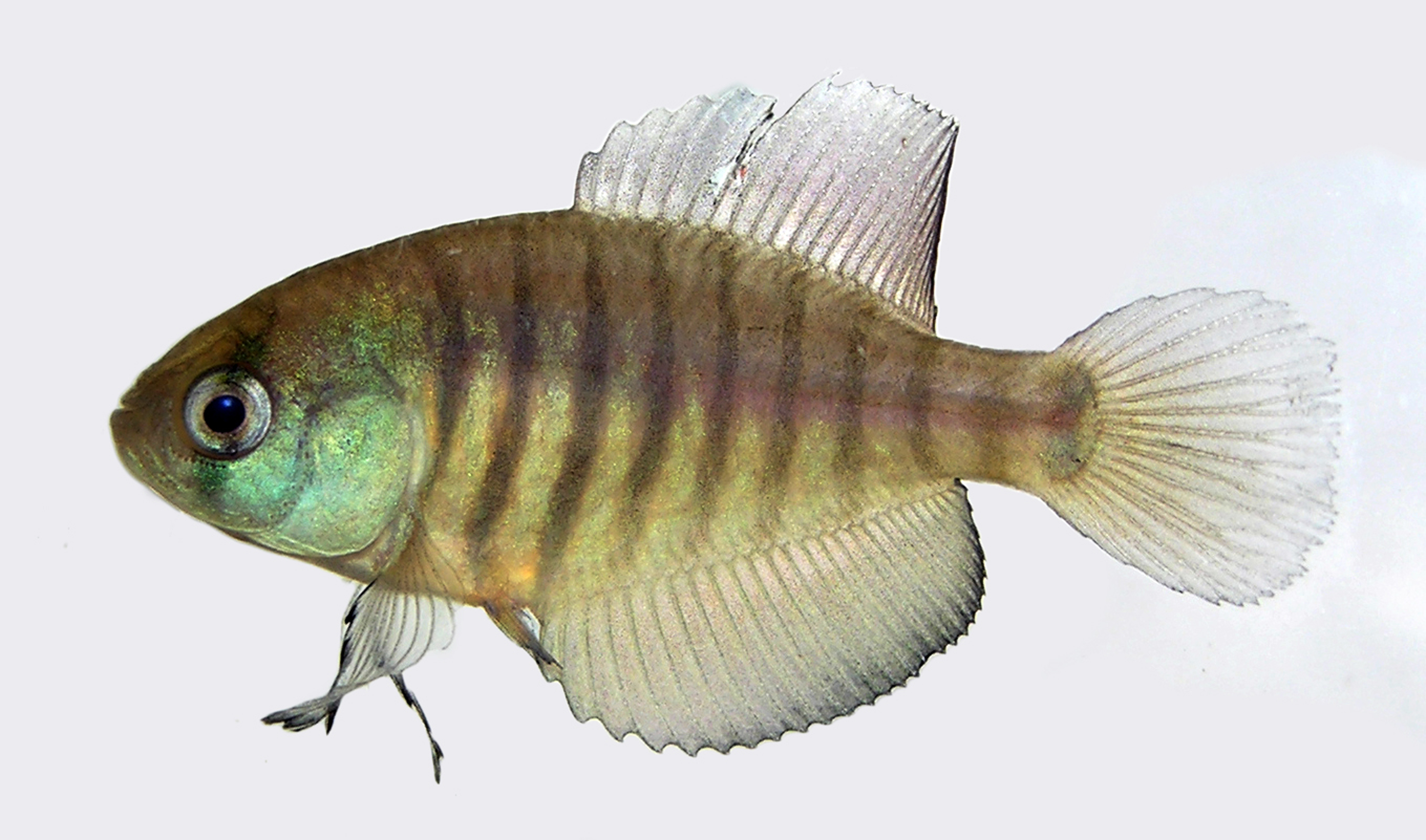
- Austrolebias adloffi (male)

Scientific classification
- Domain: Eukaryota
- Kingdom: Animalia
- Phylum: Chordata
- Class: Actinopterygii
- Order: Cyprinodontiformes
- Family: Rivulidae
- Genus: Austrolebias
- Species: A. adloffi

Binomial name
- Austrolebias adloffi (Ahl, 1922)

Synonyms
- Cynolebias adloffi Ahl, 1922

= Austrolebias adloffi =

Species of fish

Austrolebias adloffi is a species of fish that can be found in the Santa Catarina region in Brazil.

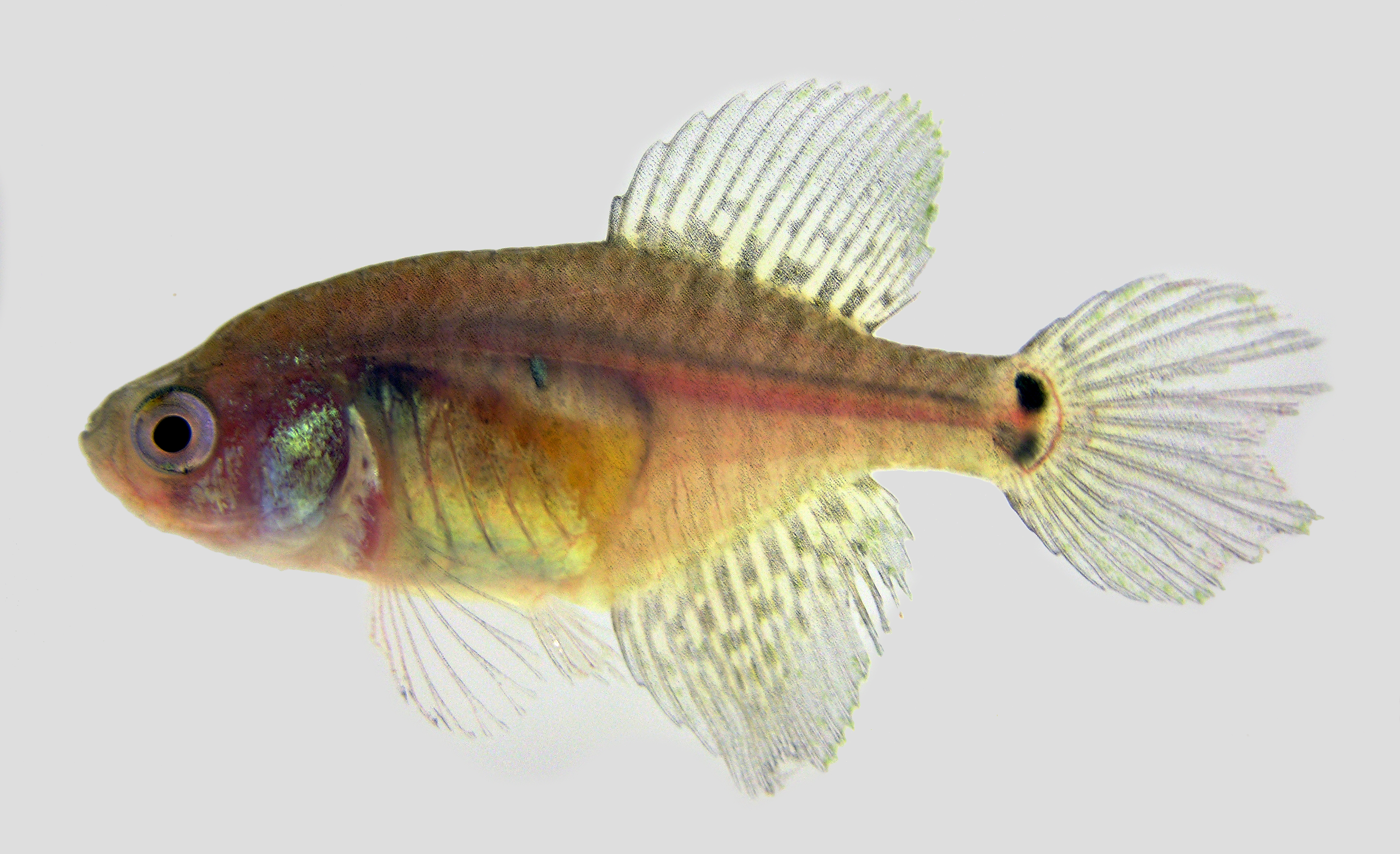
Austrolebias adloffi (female)

== Physical description ==
The male is blue with a bar across the eye. 9 to 12 bars go down vertically. The fins are blue with slightly dark margins. The female looks different from the male and is brown with bars that can barely be seen.

== Life span ==
44 specimens hatched at 22 degrees Celsius had a mean life span of 11 to 11 1/2 months. Out of the 44 specimens, the maximal life span was less than 14 months. The February 1965 study concluded that annual fish live short lives and that if Cynolebias species are at 16 degrees Celsius, the fish have decreased aging.

Another experiment showed that Cynolebias elongatus, Cynolebias wolterstoffi, and this species can have a longer life span if their body temperature is lowered 3 to 5 degrees. The scientists came to this result by putting different specimens in different temperatures to show a survival rate.

== Naming ==
Austrolebias adloffi was described as Cynolebias adloffi in 1922 by Ernst Ahl. The specific name honours the German-born Brazilian artist Alfred Adloff, who discovered it. It is the type species of the genus Austrolebias.
