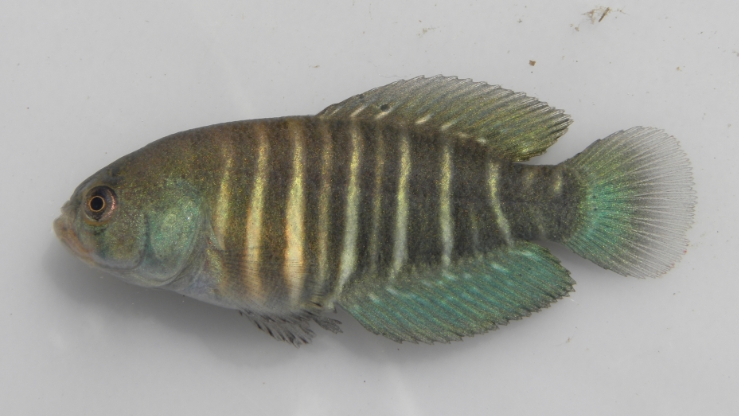

Scientific classification
- Kingdom: Animalia
- Phylum: Chordata
- Class: Actinopterygii
- Order: Cyprinodontiformes
- Family: Rivulidae
- Genus: Austrolebias
- Species: A. arachan

Binomial name
- Austrolebias arachan Loureiro, Azpelicueta & G. B. García, 2004
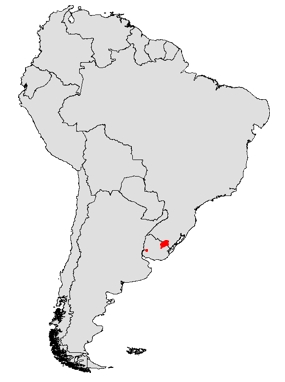
- Distribution of Austrolebias arachan (red)

= Austrolebias arachan =

Species of fish

Austrolebias arachan is a species of killifish from the family Rivulidae. It has only been recorded in Uruguay. This species was described in 2004 with the type locality given as a pond in Cerro Largo province.

== Etymology ==
The specific name being a reference the natives of that province, the Arachán.
