= Austrolebias minuano =

Scientific classification
- Kingdom: Animalia
- Phylum: Chordata
- Class: Actinopterygii
- Order: Cyprinodontiformes
- Family: Rivulidae
- Genus: Austrolebias
- Species: A. minuano

Binomial name
- Austrolebias minuano Costa & Cheffe, 2001
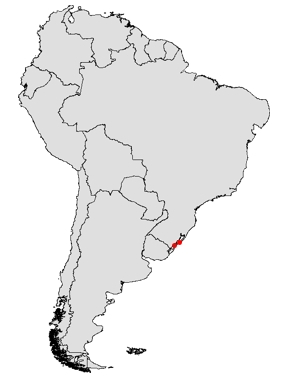
- Distribution of Austrolebias minuano (red)

Species of fish

Austrolebias minuano is a species of killifish from the family Rivulidae. It is endemic to plains to the south of the Laguna dos Patos in southern Brazil. This species was described in 2001 with the type locality given as a Temporary lagoon about 4.5 kilometers north of the town of Quinta in Rio Grande do Sul. The specific name refers to the Minuane an indigenous people who lived in Rio Grande do Sul.
