= Orthochromis uvinzae =

Conservation status
- Critically Endangered (IUCN 3.1)

Scientific classification
- Kingdom: Animalia
- Phylum: Chordata
- Class: Actinopterygii
- Order: Cichliformes
- Family: Cichlidae
- Genus: Orthochromis
- Species: O. uvinzae

Binomial name
- Orthochromis uvinzae De Vos & Seegers, 1998

Species of fish

Orthochromis uvinzae is a species of cichlid endemic to Tanzania where it is only known from its type locality at Uvinza in the middle Malagarasi River drainage. This species can reach a length of 8.6 centimetres (3.4 in) SL.
