= Atlantirivulus santensis =

Conservation status
- Least Concern (IUCN 3.1)

Scientific classification
- Kingdom: Animalia
- Phylum: Chordata
- Class: Actinopterygii
- Order: Cyprinodontiformes
- Family: Rivulidae
- Genus: Atlantirivulus
- Species: A. santensis

Binomial name
- Atlantirivulus santensis Köhler, 1906

Synonyms
- Rivulus santensis (Köhler, 1906); Rivulus elegans santensis (Köhler, 1906)

Species of fish

Atlantirivulus santensis is a species of freshwater killifish from the family Rivulidae. It is found in Brazil.
