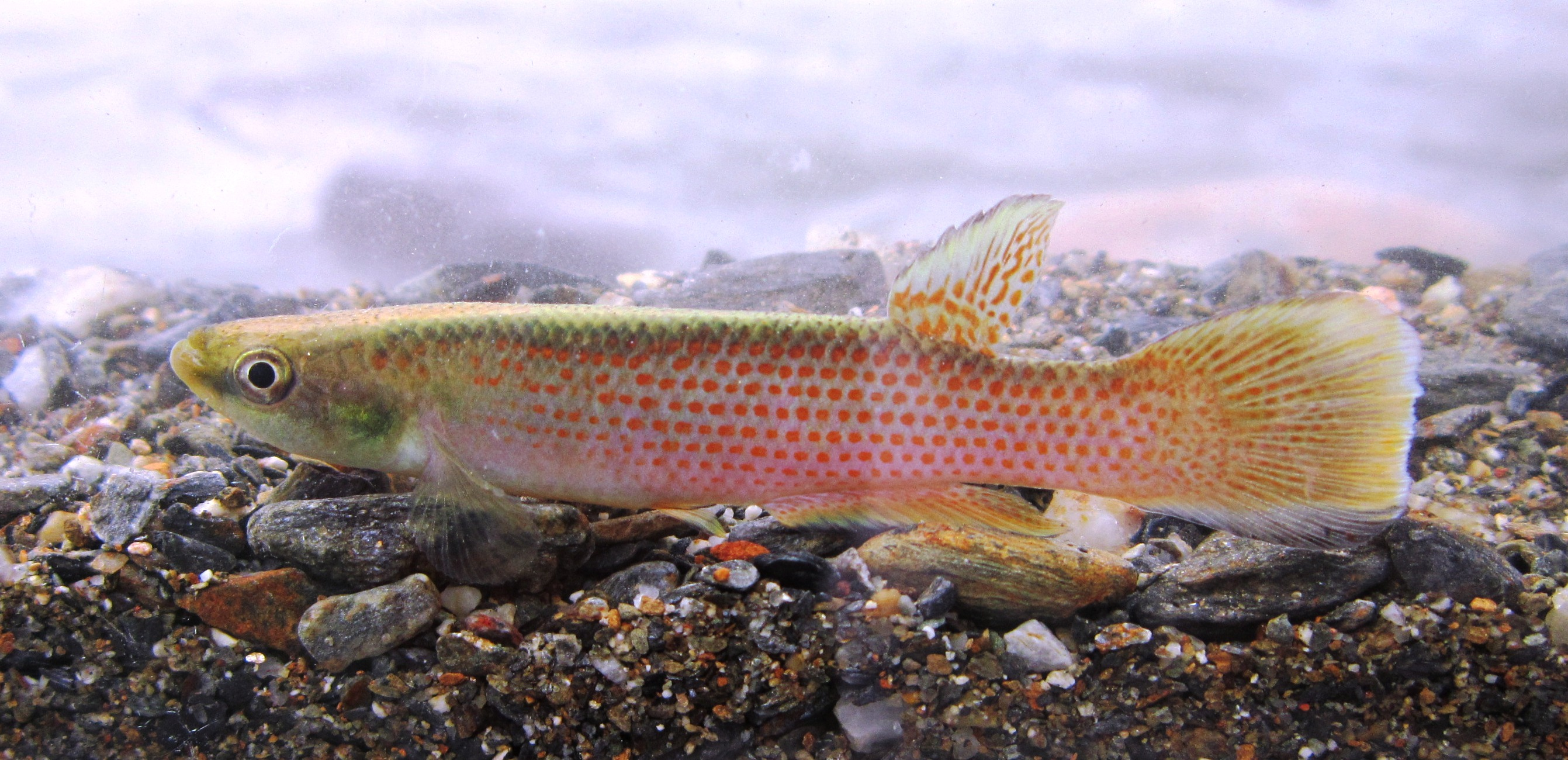
- Cynodonichthys magdalenae

Scientific classification
- Kingdom: Animalia
- Phylum: Chordata
- Class: Actinopterygii
- Order: Cyprinodontiformes
- Family: Rivulidae
- Genus: Cynodonichthys; Meek, 1904

Type species
- Cynodonichthys tenuis Meek, 1904

Synonyms
- Vomerivulus Fowler, 1944

= Cynodonichthys =

Genus of fishes

Cynodonichthys is a genus of freshwater killifish in the family Rivulidae. They are found in Middle America, ranging from southern Mexico (north to Oaxaca and the Yucatán Peninsula), through Central America (where most species live), to Colombia (in the northwest and the Magdalena River basin). They are non-annual killifish (similar to relatives such as Anablepsoides, Atlantirivulus, Laimosemion and Melanorivulus) and inhabit small forest streams from the lowlands to an altitude of 1,500 m (4,900 ft).

They are small fish, up to 4.5–9 cm (1.8–3.5 in) in total length depending on the exact species.

== Species ==
Until 2011, Cynodonichthys were included in Rivulus, and some prefer to maintain them in that genus.

If recognized as a valid genus, there are currently 32 species in Cynodonichthys:

- Cynodonichthys azurescens (Vermeulen, 2013)
- Cynodonichthys birkhahni (Berkenkamp & Etzel, 1992)
- Cynodonichthys boehlkei (Huber & Fels, 1985)
- Cynodonichthys brunneus (Meek & Hildebrand, 1913)
- Cynodonichthys chucunaque (Breder, 1925)
- Cynodonichthys degreefi (Collier, 2016)
- Cynodonichthys elegans (Steindachner, 1880)
- Cynodonichthys frommi (Berkenkamp & Etzel, 1993)
- Cynodonichthys fuscolineatus (W. A. Bussing, 1980)
- Cynodonichthys glaucus (W. A. Bussing, 1980)
- Cynodonichthys godmani (Regan, 1907)
- Cynodonichthys hendrichsi (Álvarez & Carranza, 1952)
- Cynodonichthys hildebrandi (G. S. Myers, 1927)
- Cynodonichthys isthmensis (Garman, 1895)
- Cynodonichthys kuelpmanni (Berkenkamp & Etzel, 1993)
- Cynodonichthys leucurus (Fowler, 1944)
- Cynodonichthys magdalenae (C. H. Eigenmann & Henn, 1916)
- Cynodonichthys monikae (Berkenkamp & Etzel, 1995)
- Cynodonichthys montium (Hildebrand, 1938)
- Cynodonichthys myersi (C. L. Hubbs, 1936)
- Cynodonichthys pacificus (Huber, 1992)
- Cynodonichthys pivijay (Vermeulen, 2013)
- Cynodonichthys ribesrubrum (Vermeulen, 2013)
- Cynodonichthys rubripunctatus (W. A. Bussing, 1980)
- Cynodonichthys siegfriedi (W. A. Bussing, 1980)
- Cynodonichthys sucubti (Breder, 1925)
- Cynodonichthys tenuis Meek, 1904
- Cynodonichthys uroflammeus (W. A. Bussing, 1980)
- Cynodonichthys villwocki (Berkenkamp & Etzel, 1997)
- Cynodonichthys wassmanni (Berkenkamp & Etzel, 1999)
- Cynodonichthys weberi (Huber, 1992)
- Cynodonichthys xi (Vermeulen, 2013)
