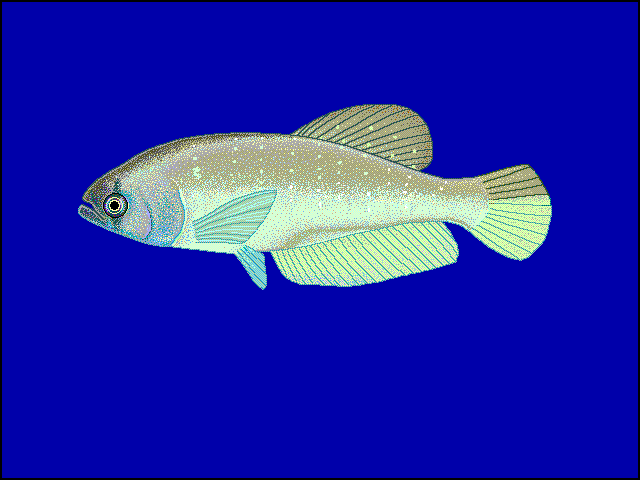

Scientific classification
- Kingdom: Animalia
- Phylum: Chordata
- Class: Actinopterygii
- Order: Cyprinodontiformes
- Family: Rivulidae
- Genus: Austrolebias
- Species: A. bellottii

Binomial name
- Austrolebias bellottii (Steindachner, 1881)

Synonyms
- Cynolebias bellottii Steindachner, 1881; Cynolebias maculatus Steindachner, 1881; Cynolebias gibberosus Berg, 1897; Cynolebias irregularis Ahl, 1938; Austrolebias apaii Costa, Laurino, Recuero & Salvia, 2006

= Austrolebias bellottii =

Species of fish

Austrolebias bellottii, the Argentine pearlfish, is a species of killifish from the family Rivulidae which occurs in the basins of the Paraná River and Uruguay River, in Argentina and Uruguay. This species was described as Cynolebias bellottii by the Austrian ichthyologist Franz Steindachner in 1881 from types collected at La Plata, Argentina. The specific name honours the Italian biologist and paleontologist Cristoforo Bellotti (1823–1919), who supplied Steindachner with specimens from his collection at Museo Civico di Storia Naturale di Milano. It is the type species of the genus Austrolebias.
