= Orthochromis rubrolabialis =

Conservation status
- Endangered (IUCN 3.1)

Scientific classification
- Kingdom: Animalia
- Phylum: Chordata
- Class: Actinopterygii
- Order: Cichliformes
- Family: Cichlidae
- Genus: Orthochromis
- Species: O. rubrolabialis

Binomial name
- Orthochromis rubrolabialis De Vos & Seegers, 1998

Species of fish

Orthochromis rubrolabialis is a species of cichlid endemic to Tanzania where it is only known from the Majamazi River. This species can reach a length of 5 centimetres (2.0 in) SL.
