= Sabrefin killifish =

Conservation status
- Vulnerable (IUCN 2.3)

Scientific classification
- Kingdom: Animalia
- Phylum: Chordata
- Class: Actinopterygii
- Order: Cyprinodontiformes
- Family: Rivulidae
- Genus: Campellolebias
- Species: C. brucei

Binomial name
- Campellolebias brucei Vaz Ferreira & Sierra de Soriano, 1974

Synonyms
- Cynolebias brucei (Vaz-Ferreira & Sierra, 1974)

Species of fish

The sabrefin killifish (Campellolebias brucei), also known as the Santa Catarina sabrefin or Turner's gaucho, is a species of killifish in the family Rivulidae. It is endemic to Brazil. This species was described in 1974 with the type locality being a temporary pool between Criciuma and Tubarão in Santa Catarina state. The specific name honours the American ichthyologist, geneticist and ecologist Bruce J. Turner.
