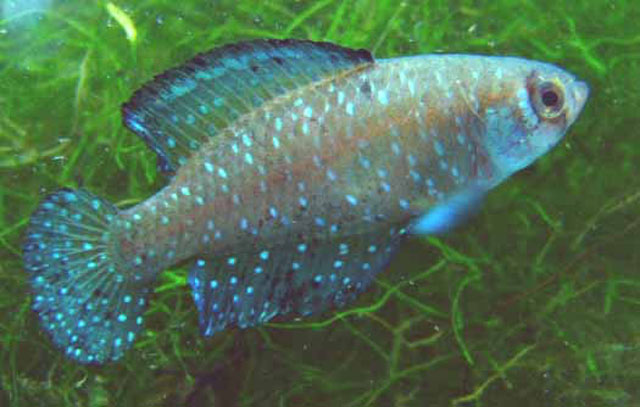
- Austrolebias nigripinnis

Scientific classification
- Kingdom: Animalia
- Phylum: Chordata
- Class: Actinopterygii
- Order: Cyprinodontiformes
- Family: Rivulidae
- Genus: Austrolebias; W. J. E. M. Costa, 1998

Type species
- Cynolebias bellottii Steindachner, 1881

Synonyms
- Acantholebias Costa, 2008; Acrolebias Costa 2008; Argolebias Costa 2008; Cypholebias Costa 2008; Gymnolebias Costa 2008; Megalebias Costa 2008

= Austrolebias =

Genus of fishes

Austrolebias nigripinnis, also known as blackfin pearlfish, is an ephemeral killifish in the family Rivulidae. These annual killifish lives in temporary water bodies during the season, thus it undergoes its entire life cycle within the periodically drying-up temporary ponds in the Río de la Plata, Patos–Mirim and Mamoré basins in South Americal [10]

Most species are small, less than 10 cm (3.9 in) in total length, but a few reach 15–22 cm (5.9–8.7 in), making them some of the largest killifish (only a few Fundulus, Moema and Orestias reach a similar or larger size).

== Species ==
There are currently 46 recognized species in this genus:

- Austrolebias accorsii D. T. B. Nielsen & Pillet, 2015
- Austrolebias adloffi (C. G. E. Ahl, 1922)
- Austrolebias affinis (L. H. Amato, 1986)
- Austrolebias alexandri (Castello & R. B. López, 1974)
- Austrolebias arachan Loureiro, Azpelicueta & G. B. García, 2004
- Austrolebias araucarianus W. J. E. M. Costa, 2014
- Austrolebias bagual M. V. Volcan, Lanés & Â. C. Gonçalves, 2014
- Austrolebias bellottii (Steindachner, 1881) (Argentine pearlfish)
- Austrolebias carvalhoi (G. S. Myers, 1947)
- Austrolebias charrua W. J. E. M. Costa & Cheffe, 2001
- Austrolebias cheradophilus (Vaz Ferreira, Sierra de Soriano & Scaglia de Paulete, 1964)
- Austrolebias cinereus (L. H. Amato, 1986)
- Austrolebias cyaneus (L. H. Amato, 1987)
- Austrolebias duraznensis (G. B. García, Scvortzoff & A. Hernández, 1995)
- Austrolebias elongatus (Steindachner, 1881)
- Austrolebius ephemerus Volcan & Severo-Neto, 2019
- Austrolebias gymnoventris (L. H. Amato, 1986)
- Austrolebias ibicuiensis (W. J. E. M. Costa, 1999)
- Austrolebias jaegari W. J. E. M. Costa & Cheffe, 2002
- Austrolebias juanlangi W. J. E. M. Costa, Cheffe, Salvia & Litz, 2006
- Austrolebias litzi W. J. E. M. Costa, 2006
- Austrolebias luteoflammulatus (Vaz Ferreira, Sierra de Soriano & Scaglia de Paulete, 1964)
- Austrolebias melanoorus (L. H. Amato, 1986)
- Austrolebias minuano W. J. E. M. Costa & Cheffe, 2001
- Austrolebias monstrosus (Huber, 1995)
- Austrolebias nachtigalli W. J. E. M. Costa & Cheffe, 2006
- Austrolebias nigripinnis (Regan, 1912) (Black-fin pearlfish)
- Austrolebias nigrofasciatus W. J. E. M. Costa & Cheffe, 2001
- Austrolebias nioni (Berkenkamp, Reichert & Prieto, 1997)
- Austrolebias nonoiuliensis (Taberner, Fernández-Santos & Castelli, 1974)
- Austrolebias paranaensis W. J. E. M. Costa, 2006
- Austrolebias patriciae (Huber, 1995)
- Austrolebias paucisquama Ferrer, L. R. Malabarba & W. J. E. M. Costa, 2008
- Austrolebias periodicus (W. J. E. M. Costa, 1999)
- Austrolebias prognathus (L. H. Amato, 1986)
- Austrolebias quirogai Loureiro, Duarte & Zarucki, 2011
- Austrolebias reicherti (Loureiro & G. B. García, 2004)
- Austrolebias robustus (Günther, 1883)
- Austrolebias toba Calviño, 2006
- Austrolebias univentripinnis W. J. E. M. Costa & Cheffe, 2005
- Austrolebias vandenbergi (Huber, 1995)
- Austrolebias varzeae W. J. E. M. Costa, R. E. dos Reis & Behr, 2004
- Austrolebias vazferreirai (Berkenkamp, Etzel, Reichert & Salvia, 1994)
- Austrolebias viarius (Vaz Ferreira, Sierra de Soriano & Scaglia de Paulete, 1964)
- Austrolebias wolterstorffi (C. G. E. Ahl, 1924)
