= Orthochromis =

Scientific classification
- Kingdom: Animalia
- Phylum: Chordata
- Class: Actinopterygii
- Order: Cichliformes
- Family: Cichlidae
- Subfamily: Pseudocrenilabrinae
- Tribe: Haplochromini
- Genus: Orthochromis; Greenwood, 1954

Type species
- Haplochromis malagaraziensis David, 1937

Genus of fishes

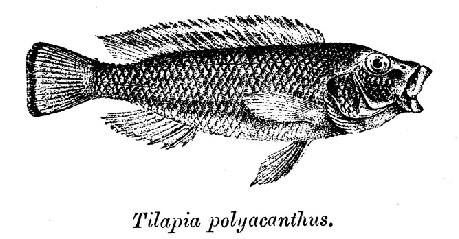
Orthochromis polyacanthus

Orthochromis is a genus of relatively small haplochromine cichlids native to rivers and lakes in Eastern and Middle Africa. Most of its species are rheophilic.

As presently defined Orthochromis is polyphyletic. Some Orthochromis species were formerly included in Schwetzochromis.

== Species ==
There are currently 14 recognized species in this genus:

- Orthochromis kalungwishiensis (Greenwood & Kullander, 1994)
- Orthochromis kasuluensis De Vos & Seegers, 1998
- Orthochromis luichensis De Vos & Seegers, 1998
- Orthochromis luongoensis (Greenwood & Kullander, 1994)
- Orthochromis machadoi (Poll, 1967) (Kunene Dwarf Happy)
- Orthochromis malagaraziensis (David, 1937)
- Orthochromis mazimeroensis De Vos & Seegers, 1998
- Orthochromis mosoensis De Vos & Seegers, 1998
- Orthochromis polyacanthus (Boulenger, 1899)
- Orthochromis rubrolabialis De Vos & Seegers, 1998
- Orthochromis rugufuensis De Vos & Seegers, 1998
- Orthochromis stormsi (Boulenger, 1902)
- Orthochromis torrenticola (Thys van den Audenaerde, 1963)
- Orthochromis uvinzae De Vos & Seegers, 1998
