= Orthochromis rugufuensis =

Conservation status
- Vulnerable (IUCN 3.1)

Scientific classification
- Kingdom: Animalia
- Phylum: Chordata
- Class: Actinopterygii
- Order: Cichliformes
- Family: Cichlidae
- Genus: Orthochromis
- Species: O. rugufuensis

Binomial name
- Orthochromis rugufuensis De Vos & Seegers, 1998

Species of fish

Orthochromis rugufuensis is a species of cichlid endemic to Tanzania where it is only known from the upper Rugufu River system. This species can reach a length of 5.7 centimetres (2.2 in) SL.
