= Atlantirivulus haraldsiolii =

Conservation status
- Least Concern (IUCN 3.1)

Scientific classification
- Kingdom: Animalia
- Phylum: Chordata
- Class: Actinopterygii
- Order: Cyprinodontiformes
- Family: Rivulidae
- Genus: Atlantirivulus
- Species: A. haraldsiolii

Binomial name
- Atlantirivulus haraldsiolii Berkenkamp, 1984

Synonyms
- Rivulus haraldsiolii (Berkenkamp, 1984)

Species of fish

Atlantirivulus haraldsiolii is a freshwater killifish from the family Rivulidae. It is most commonly found in Brazil.
