= Orthochromis kasuluensis =

Conservation status
- Endangered (IUCN 3.1)

Scientific classification
- Kingdom: Animalia
- Phylum: Chordata
- Class: Actinopterygii
- Order: Cichliformes
- Family: Cichlidae
- Genus: Orthochromis
- Species: O. kasuluensis

Binomial name
- Orthochromis kasuluensis De Vos & Seegers, 1998

Species of fish

Orthochromis kasuluensis is a species of cichlid endemic to Tanzania where it is only known from the upper Ruchugi River drainage. This species can reach a length of 7.8 centimetres (3.1 in) SL.
