= Orthochromis luichensis =

Conservation status
- Vulnerable (IUCN 3.1)

Scientific classification
- Kingdom: Animalia
- Phylum: Chordata
- Class: Actinopterygii
- Order: Cichliformes
- Family: Cichlidae
- Genus: Orthochromis
- Species: O. luichensis

Binomial name
- Orthochromis luichensis De Vos & Seegers, 1998

Species of fish

Orthochromis luichensis is a species of cichlid endemic to Tanzania where it is only known to occur in tributaries of the Luiche River. This species can reach a length of 9.1 centimetres (3.6 in) SL.
