= Arachán =

Extinct indigenous group of Uruguay

Arachanes (sing. Arachán) were a group of Indigenous peoples in Uruguay of dubious existence (known through only one document). Their origin is not very well-known, but some scholars consider them (if they existed) to be different from other local ethnicities. They were said to have come from the Inca Highlands (currently Bolivia and Peru) thousands of years ago. Their name is composed of two elements: "eastern", "oriental" (Guarani: ara) + "Canna" (Quechua: achuy), as they used to cultivate Cannaceae as staple food.

== Legacy ==
Nowadays the people of Cerro Largo Department are sometimes known as "arachanes", in memory of this extinct local ethnicity. There is also a small seaside resort in Rocha Department known as Arachania. The rivuline Austrolebias arachan was named after them as well.
