= Pterolebias zonatus =

Scientific classification
- Domain: Eukaryota
- Kingdom: Animalia
- Phylum: Chordata
- Class: Actinopterygii
- Order: Cyprinodontiformes
- Family: Rivulidae
- Genus: Pterolebias
- Species: P. zonatus

Binomial name
- Pterolebias zonatus G. S. Myers, 1935

Synonyms
- Gnatholebias zonatus (Myers, 1935)

Species of fish

Pterolebias zonatus is a species of fish in the family Aplocheilidae endemic to the Orinoco River basin in Venezuela where it is found in open waters exposed to sunlight. This species grows to a length of 10 cm (3.9 in). It is found in the aquarium trade. This species is often included in the genus Gnatholebias, of which it has been designated the type species. This species, and Pterlolebias hoignei, are rather distantly related to the other species in Pterolebias and some workers argue that their inclusion in that genus makes it paraphyletic.
