= Papiliolebias =

Scientific classification
- Kingdom: Animalia
- Phylum: Chordata
- Class: Actinopterygii
- Order: Cyprinodontiformes
- Family: Rivulidae
- Genus: Papiliolebias; W. J. E. M. Costa, 1998

Type species
- Plesiolebias bitteri W. J. E. M. Costa, 1989

Genus of fishes

Papiliolebias is a genus of fish in the family Rivulidae. These annual killifish are endemic to seasonal pools in the Paraguay and upper Madeira river basins in northwestern Argentina, central and southeastern Bolivia, and western Paraguay.

They are small fish, up to 5 cm (2.0 in) in total length. As typical of killifish, males are more colorful than females.

== Species ==
Papiliolebias and the closely related Maratecoara, Pituna, Plesiolebias and Stenolebias form a clade, Plesiolebiasini.

There are currently 5 recognized species in Papiliolebias:

- Papiliolebias ashleyae D. T. B. Nielsen & Brousseau, 2014
- Papiliolebias bitteri (W. J. E. M. Costa, 1989)
- Papiliolebias francescae Valdesalici & Brousseau, 2014
- Papiliolebias habluetzeli Valdesalici, D. T. B. Nielsen, Brousseau & Phunkner, 2016
- Papiliolebias hatinne Azpelicueta, Butí & G. B. García, 2009
