= Rachovia =

Scientific classification
- Kingdom: Animalia
- Phylum: Chordata
- Class: Actinopterygii
- Order: Cyprinodontiformes
- Family: Rivulidae
- Genus: Rachovia; G. S. Myers, 1927

Type species
- Rivulus brevis Regan, 1912

Genus of fishes

Rachovia is a genus of killifish from the family Rivulidae the species of which are endemic to the Orinoco, Maracaibo and Magdalena basins in Colombia and Venezuela, where they live in small temporary waters like ponds. They are small annual killifish that reach up to 6 cm (2.4 in) in total length. The name of this genus honours the German aquarist Arthur Rachow (1884–1960) who sent fish specimens to George S. Myers.

== Species ==
Rachovia formerly included Llanolebias, but these are now regarded as separate genera. Rachovia and Austrofundulus are closely related, and it has been suggested that the latter should be merged into the former.

There are currently six recognized species of Rachovia:

- Rachovia brevis (Regan, 1912)
- Rachovia fransvermeuleni Berkenkamp, 2020
- Rachovia hummelincki de Beaufort, 1940
- Rachovia maculipinnis (Radda, 1964)
- Rachovia pyropunctata Taphorn & Thomerson, 1978
- Rachovia splendens Dahl, 1958
