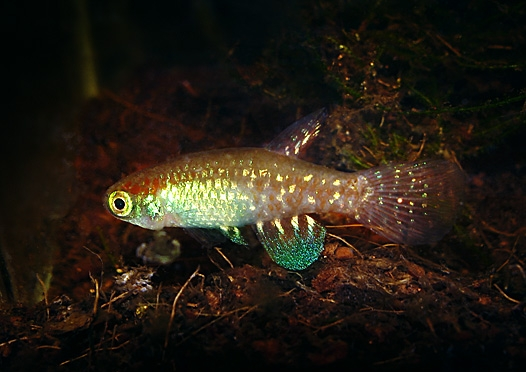
- Plesiolebias glaucopterus

Scientific classification
- Kingdom: Animalia
- Phylum: Chordata
- Class: Actinopterygii
- Order: Cyprinodontiformes
- Family: Rivulidae
- Genus: Plesiolebias; W. J. E. M. Costa, 1989

Type species
- Cynolebias xavantei Costa, Lacerda & Tanizaki, 1988

= Plesiolebias =

Genus of fishes

Plesiolebias is a genus of fish in the family Rivulidae. These annual killifish are endemic to seasonal pools, swamps and lagoons in the Araguaia–Tocantins, Xingu, and uppermost Paraguay (Pantanal) river basins in Brazil.

They are small fish, up to 5 cm (2.0 in) in total length. As typical of killifish, males are more colorful than females.

== Species ==
Plesiolebias and the closely related Maratecoara, Papiliolebias, Pituna and Stenolebias form a clade, Plesiolebiasini.

There are currently eight recognized species in Plesiolebias:

- Plesiolebias altamira W. J. E. M. Costa & D. T. B. Nielsen, 2007
- Plesiolebias aruana (Lazara, 1991)
- Plesiolebias canabravensis W. J. E. M. Costa & D. T. B. Nielsen, 2007
- Plesiolebias filamentosus W. J. E. M. Costa & G. C. Brasil, 2007
- Plesiolebias fragilis W. J. E. M. Costa, 2007
- Plesiolebias glaucopterus (W. J. E. M. Costa & Lacerda, 1989)
- Plesiolebias lacerdai W. J. E. M. Costa, 1989
- Plesiolebias xavantei (W. J. E. M. Costa, Lacerda & Tanizaki, 1988)
