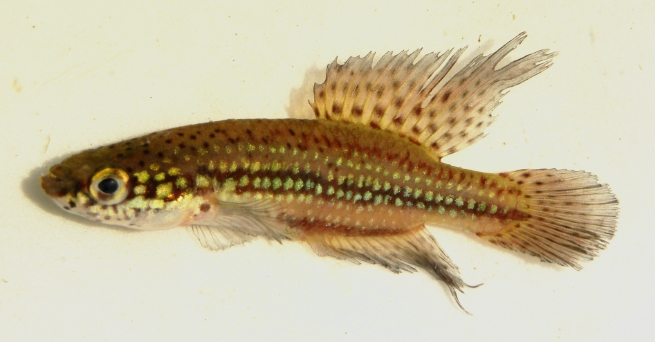
- Cynopoecilus melanotaenia

Scientific classification
- Kingdom: Animalia
- Phylum: Chordata
- Class: Actinopterygii
- Order: Cyprinodontiformes
- Family: Rivulidae
- Genus: Cynopoecilus; Regan, 1912

Type species
- Cynolebias melanotaenia Regan, 1912

Synonyms
- Poecilopanchax Costa, 2016

= Cynopoecilus =

Genus of fishes

Cynopoecilus is a genus of killifish in the family Rivulidae. They are endemic to seasonal temporary pools in Southern Brazil and northeastern Uruguay. Most species are restricted to the region bordering the Patos–Mirim lagoons, but C. feltrini is found at the Tubarão River (north of the lagoons) and C. intimus is found at the middle Gravataí River (inland from the lagoons). The Cynopoecilus species have small ranges and are often threatened. The region inhabited by C. intimus has experienced extensive habitat destruction and recent surveys have not been able to locate this species; it may already be extinct.

They are small fish, up to 4.4 cm (1.7 in) in standard length. Uniquely among killifish, Cynopoecilus and the closely related Campellolebias have internal fertilization.

== Species ==
There are currently 6 recognized species in this genus:

- Cynopoecilus feltrini W. J. E. M. Costa, Amorim & Mattos, 2016
- Cynopoecilus fulgens W. J. E. M. Costa, 2002
- Cynopoecilus intimus W. J. E. M. Costa, 2002
- Cynopoecilus melanotaenia (Regan, 1912)
- Cynopoecilus nigrovittatus W. J. E. M. Costa, 2002
- Cynopoecilus notabilis Ferrer, Wingert & L. R. Malabarba, 2014
