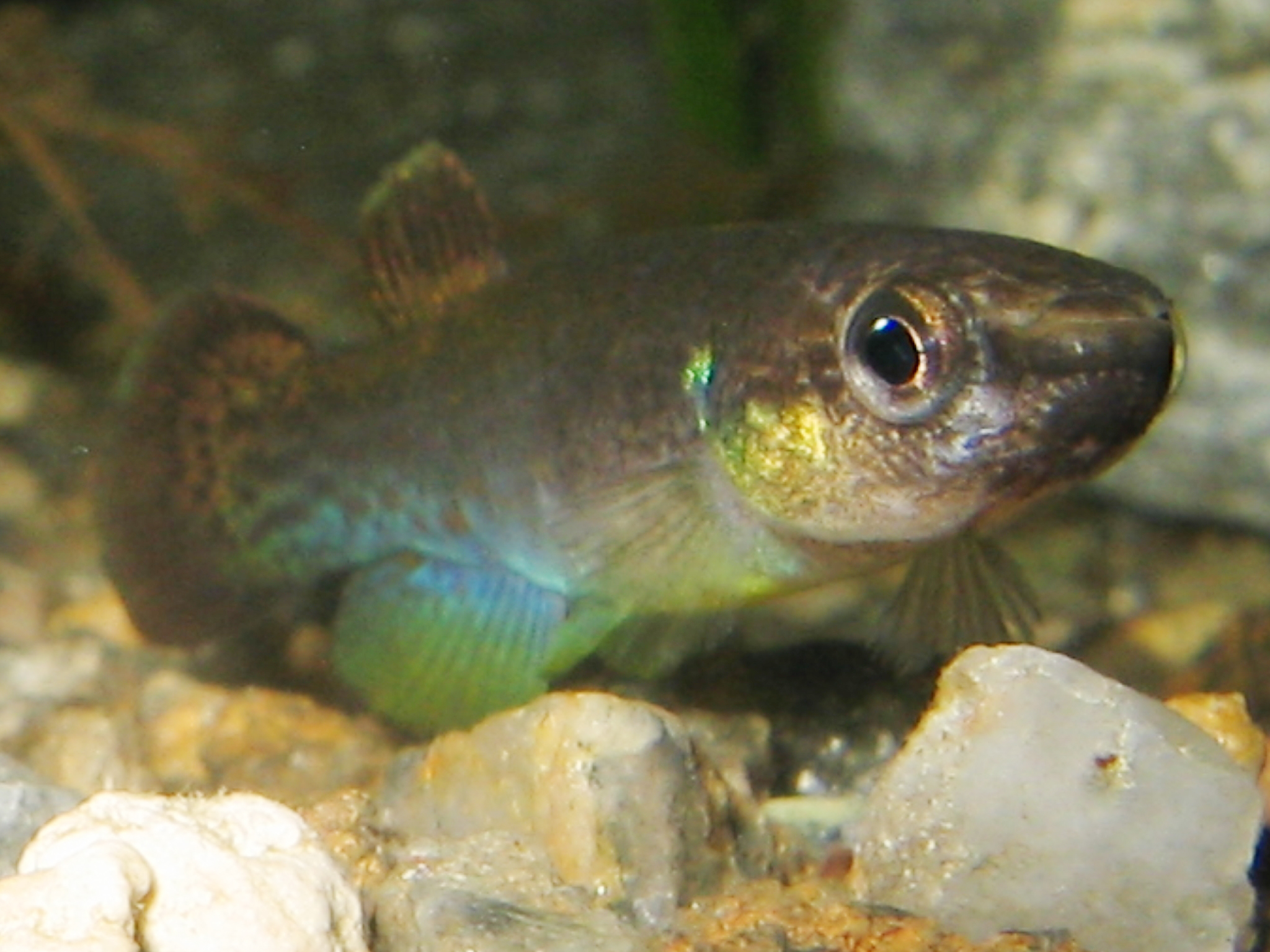
- Rivulus cylindraceus (male)

Scientific classification
- Kingdom: Animalia
- Phylum: Chordata
- Class: Actinopterygii
- Order: Cyprinodontiformes
- Family: Rivulidae
- Genus: Rivulus; Poey, 1860

Type species
- Rivulus cylindraceus Poey, 1860

= Rivulus =

Genus of fishes

Rivulus is a genus of small freshwater fish in the Cyprinodontiformes family Rivulidae. It was traditionally considered to be the largest genus in its family; however, the genus's size is currently in dispute. Wilson J. E. Costa split this genus into several new genera (including Anablepsoides, Atlantirivulus, Cynodonichthys, Kryptolebias, Laimosemion and Melanorivulus) in 2004 and 2011, leaving only a few Greater Antillean species in Rivulus itself. Despite being moved to other genera, some of the species retain the common name "rivulus", like the well-known mangrove rivulus (Kryptolebias marmoratus). Shortly after the review by Costa, another review authored by J.H. Huber refuted the split, moving the proposed genera back in Rivulus and again making the genus the largest in the family Aplocheilidae.

If the split is recognized, the genus Rivulus only includes three non-annual killifish species from western Cuba (including Isla de la Juventud) and Hispaniola where they inhabit streams, rivers and lagoons from the highlands to the coast. If the split into multiple genera is not recognized, Rivulus contains more than 150 non-annual killifish species found in fresh and brackish waters of the tropical and subtropical Americas, ranging from Argentina in south to Mexico in north, including the Caribbean region.

== Species ==
Three species are included in Rivulus:

- Rivulus berovidesi R. R. Silva, 2015
- Rivulus cylindraceus Poey, 1860 (Green rivulus)
- Rivulus roloffi Roloff, 1938 (Hispaniolan rivulus)

A fourth species, R. insulaepinorum, has been recognized, but it is a synonym of R. cylindraceus. The two Cuban species are close relatives, but the position of the Hispaniolan R. roloffi has not been confirmed and its placement in this genus is preliminary.

Because of the disputed validity of the split into several genera, there is a level of confusion about the species included in Rivulus, despite it being clearly defined in 2011. For example, "R." azurescens, "R." pivijay, "R." ribesrubrum, "R." tomasi and "R." xi were described in 2013 by authors that did not recognize the split of Rivulus, but noted that they were part of Cynodonichthys (most species) and Laimosemion ("R." tomasi), by them only considered subgenera of Rivulus. This has resulted in the unusual situation where FishBase, despite recognizing the split into several genera, places the newly described species that belong in other genera in Rivulus.
