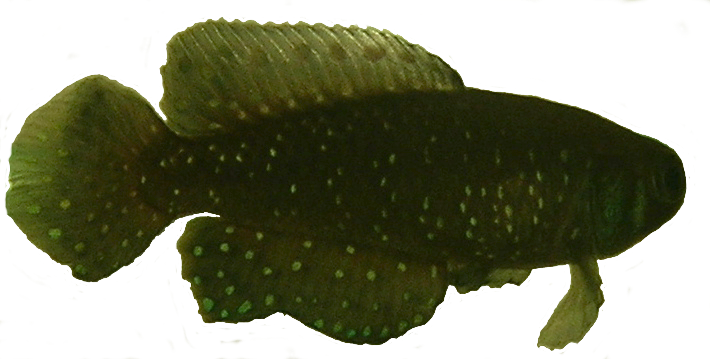

Scientific classification
- Kingdom: Animalia
- Phylum: Chordata
- Class: Actinopterygii
- Order: Cyprinodontiformes
- Family: Rivulidae
- Genus: Cynolebias; Steindachner, 1876

Type species
- Cynolebias porosus Steindachner, 1876

Species
- See text

= Cynolebias =

Genus of fishes

Cynolebias is a genus of freshwater annual killifish in the family Rivulidae. They are endemic to northeastern Brazil, generally in temporary waters such as ponds in the Caatinga and adjacent regions. By far the highest species richness is in the São Francisco River basin, but there are also species east and north of this system, and west as far as the Tocantins River basin. Many species have rather small distributions and some are highly threatened.

They are small thickset fish, up to 5–15 cm (2.0–5.9 in) in total length depending on the exact species.

== Species ==
The currently recognized species in this genus are:

- Cynolebias albipunctatus W. J. E. M. Costa & G. C. Brasil, 1991
- Cynolebias altus W. J. E. M. Costa, 2001
- Cynolebias attenuatus W. J. E. M. Costa, 2001
- Cynolebias gibbus W. J. E. M. Costa, 2001
- Cynolebias gilbertoi W. J. E. M. Costa, 1998
- Cynolebias griseus W. J. E. M. Costa, Lacerda & G. C. Brasil, 1990
- Cynolebias itapicuruensis W. J. E. M. Costa, 2001
- Cynolebias leptocephalus W. J. E. M. Costa & G. C. Brasil, 1993
- Cynolebias microphthalmus W. J. E. M. Costa & G. C. Brasil, 1995
- Cynolebias obscurus W. J. E. M. Costa, 2014
- Cynolebias ochraceus W. J. E. M. Costa, 2014
- Cynolebias oticus W. J. E. M. Costa, 2014
- Cynolebias paraguassuensis W. J. E. M. Costa, Suzart & D. T. B. Nielsen, 2007
- Cynolebias parietalis W. J. E. M. Costa, 2014
- Cynolebias parnaibensis W. J. E. M. Costa, T. P. A. Ramos, Alexandre & R. T. C. Ramos, 2010
- Cynolebias perforatus W. J. E. M. Costa & G. C. Brasil, 1991
- Cynolebias porosus Steindachner, 1876
- Cynolebias rectiventer W. J. E. M. Costa, 2014
- Cynolebias roseus W. J. E. M. Costa, 2014
- Cynolebias vazabarrisensis W. J. E. M. Costa, 2001
