= Stenolebias =

Scientific classification
- Kingdom: Animalia
- Phylum: Chordata
- Class: Actinopterygii
- Order: Cyprinodontiformes
- Family: Rivulidae
- Genus: Stenolebias; W. J. E. M. Costa, 1995

Type species
- Plesiolebias damascenoi Costa, 1991

Genus of fishes

Stenolebias is a genus of fish in the family Rivulidae. These relatively rare annual killifish are endemic to seasonal waters in the Pantanal in Brazil.

They are small fish, up to 4 cm (1.6 in) in total length.

== Species ==
Stenolebias and the closely related Maratecoara, Papiliolebias, Pituna and Plesiolebias form a clade, Plesiolebiasini.

There are currently two recognized species in Stenolebias:

- Stenolebias bellus W. J. E. M. Costa, 1995
- Stenolebias damascenoi (W. J. E. M. Costa, 1991)
