= Orthochromis kalungwishiensis =

Conservation status
- Least Concern (IUCN 3.1)

Scientific classification
- Kingdom: Animalia
- Phylum: Chordata
- Class: Actinopterygii
- Order: Cichliformes
- Family: Cichlidae
- Genus: Orthochromis
- Species: O. kalungwishiensis

Binomial name
- Orthochromis kalungwishiensis (Greenwood & Kullander, 1994)

Synonyms
- Schwetzochromis kalungwishiensis Greenwood & Kullander, 1994

Species of fish

Orthochromis kalungwishiensis is a species of cichlid endemic to Zambia, where it is only known from the Kalungwishi River, a major tributary of Lake Mweru in the upper Congo River basin. This species can reach a length of 9.9 centimetres (3.9 in) SL.
