= Orthochromis machadoi =

Conservation status
- Least Concern (IUCN 3.1)

Scientific classification
- Kingdom: Animalia
- Phylum: Chordata
- Class: Actinopterygii
- Order: Cichliformes
- Family: Cichlidae
- Genus: Orthochromis
- Species: O. machadoi

Binomial name
- Orthochromis machadoi (Poll, 1967)

Synonyms
- Schwetzochromis machadoi (Poll, 1967); Haplochromis machadoi Poll, 1967

Species of fish

Orthochromis machadoi, the Cunene dwarf happy, is a species of cichlid native to Angola and Namibia, where it is known from the Cunene River system. This species can reach a length of 6.5 centimetres (2.6 in) SL. The specific name of this fish honours the Portuguese zoologist António de Barros Machado (1912-2002) who collected the type in Angola.
