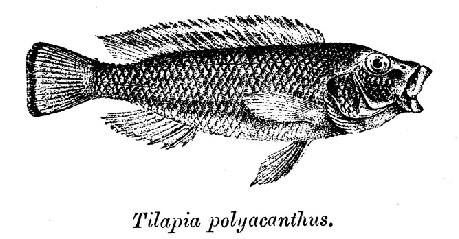

Conservation status
- Least Concern (IUCN 3.1)

Scientific classification
- Kingdom: Animalia
- Phylum: Chordata
- Class: Actinopterygii
- Order: Cichliformes
- Family: Cichlidae
- Genus: Orthochromis
- Species: O. polyacanthus

Binomial name
- Orthochromis polyacanthus (Boulenger, 1899)

Synonyms
- Schwetzochromis polyacanthus (Boulenger, 1899); Rheoaplochromis polyacanthus (Boulenger, 1899); Haplochromis polyacanthus (Boulenger, 1899); Tilapia polyacanthus Boulenger, 1899

= Orthochromis polyacanthus =

Species of fish

Orthochromis polyacanthus is a species of cichlid native to the Democratic Republic of the Congo and Zambia, where it is known from the lower Congo River rapids near Pool Malebo (Stanley Pool) and the upper Congo River basin from the Kisangani area to the Lake Mweru basin. This species can reach a length of 11.8 centimetres (4.6 in) SL.
