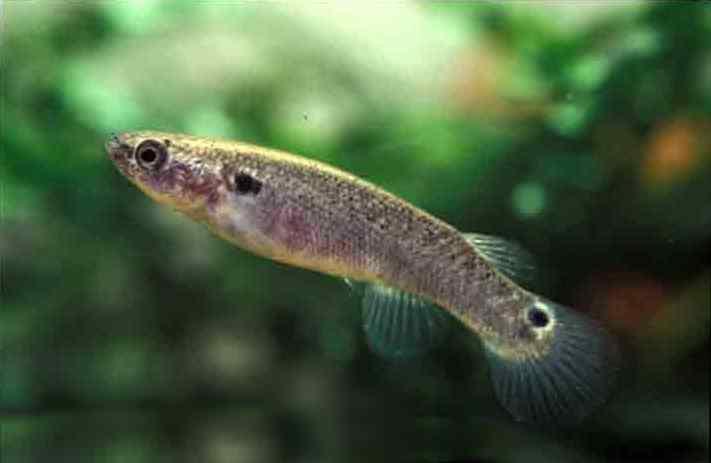
- Mangrove rivulus (K. marmoratus)

Scientific classification
- Kingdom: Animalia
- Phylum: Chordata
- Class: Actinopterygii
- Order: Cyprinodontiformes
- Family: Rivulidae
- Genus: Kryptolebias; W. J. E. M. Costa, 2004

Type species
- Fundulus brasiliensis Valenciennes, 1821

Synonyms
- Cryptolebias Costa, 2004

= Kryptolebias =

Genus of fishes

Kryptolebias is a genus of killifish in the family Rivulidae mostly native to warm parts of South America but with one species (K. marmoratus) found north through the Caribbean region to the Gulf Coast states of the United States. They are small fish, up to 7.5 cm (3.0 in) in total length. They are non-annual killifish. The genus was originally named Cryptolebias but this name was pre-occupied by a genus of fossil fish.

== Species ==
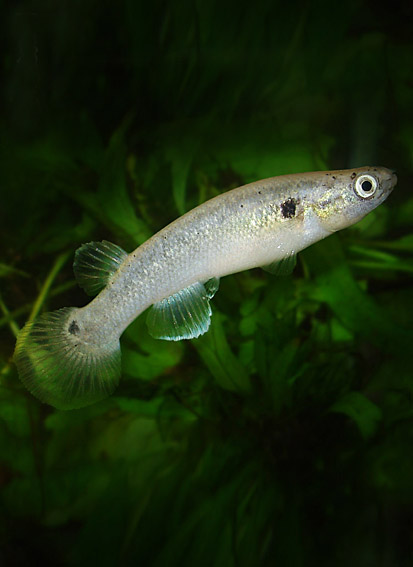
K. ocellatus

There are currently 8 recognized species in this genus:

- Kryptolebias brasiliensis Valenciennes, 1821
- Kryptolebias campelloi W. J. E. M. Costa, 1990
- Kryptolebias caudomarginatus Seegers, 1984
- Kryptolebias gracilis W. J. E. M. Costa, 2007
- Kryptolebias hermaphroditus W. J. E. M. Costa, 2011
- Kryptolebias marmoratus Poey, 1880 (Mangrove rivulus)
- Kryptolebias ocellatus R. F. Hensel, 1868
- Kryptolebias sepia Vermeulen & Hrbek, 2005
