= Winner and loser culture =

Proposed social framework

A winner and loser culture is a culture proposed by psychologist Oliver James which imagines many activities in society as a competition where one class of people are successful winners and another class are the losers who experience a lifestyle of failure.

== Characteristics ==
Psychologist Oliver James described in a 1995 book how distribution of wealth results in some young people having more money for fortunate lives among a culture of winners while other young people are poor, surrounded by violence, and live in a culture where media and society characterize much of what they do as 'loser culture'.

A 1997 socioeconomic study showed that a winner-loser culture encouraged violence in adolescents, with specific sociological emphasis on the role of violence. In part, findings reflected that juvenile violence is perpetrated by the presence of a winner-loser culture, which creates an "us against them" mindset that can lead to physical or verbal altercations.

A 2005 sociological study of alcohol advertising examined the lifestyles of men which the ads portrayed. Tropes in the ads included the men either being losers or having loser characteristics, but being comfortable and accepting of themselves. Their leisure lives in the advertisements are separate from whatever labor they do as work. They communicate desire for various kinds of relationships with females but the advertisements do not finish the story of how that plays out, and simply end with the men watching women or attempting to initiate a relationship.

A 2011 study evaluating corporate culture found that competition culture (which places the worker in a winner and loser mentality), while more common than cooperation culture, was less effective.

A 2014 sociological study of video game culture for massively multiplayer online role-playing games observed that some groups of players identify as "losers" and encourage other people in that subculture. Greater success in the game requires more time spent in the game. People who are not socializing, working, or in education may have more time to play the game. When someone has more free time because they participate in loser subculture, then that identity may bring them success in playing the game.

A 2014 study in the Sociological Review examined emotional reactions contextualized through the lens of academia by analyzing distinctions in emotional response to academia. The study found that emotional bonds can be damaged by mismanaged emotions as a result in competition culture, and that structurally, mismanaged emotions based on perceived stress from a competition culture can have negative impact on an individual and those around them.

In a 2014 sociological study of a computer competition where motivation was measured after examining the competitive culture around getting into and participating in the computer competition, findings found that students that performed well in competition ("winners") were more likely to seek out and participate in other competitions.

One advertising narrative in consumer culture is that gambling can transform a loser into a winner, and that state-sponsored games such as the lottery are worthwhile for uplifting some people in communities. Many individuals in democratic societies personally identify with their political party of choice. In various ways after an election, people who supported the elected party may feel and get treatment as winners, while supporters of the party which lost the vote may feel like losers.

The success of a social media platform depends on a small number of Internet celebrities encouraging online activities from a large mass of other contributors. One perspective of social media design is that there is a class of users who contribute to the platform to the benefit of others but not themselves, and that such contributors are losers in this scheme.

== See also ==
- One-upmanship
- Winner and loser effects
- Zero-sum
