= Orthochromis malagaraziensis =

Conservation status
- Vulnerable (IUCN 3.1)

Scientific classification
- Kingdom: Animalia
- Phylum: Chordata
- Class: Actinopterygii
- Order: Cichliformes
- Family: Cichlidae
- Genus: Orthochromis
- Species: O. malagaraziensis

Binomial name
- Orthochromis malagaraziensis (David, 1937)

Synonyms
- Haplochromis malagaraziensis David, 1937; Schwetzochromis malagaraziensis (David, 1937)

Species of fish

Orthochromis malagaraziensis is a species of cichlid native to the Malagarasi River in Tanzania and Burundi. This species can reach a length of 15 centimetres (5.9 in) SL.
