= Maratecoara =

Scientific classification
- Kingdom: Animalia
- Phylum: Chordata
- Class: Actinopterygii
- Order: Cyprinodontiformes
- Family: Rivulidae
- Genus: Maratecoara; W. J. E. M. Costa, 1995

Type species
- Cynolebias lacortei Lazara, 1991

Genus of fishes

Maratecoara is a genus of killifish in the family Rivulidae. These annual killifish are endemic to seasonal pools, swamps and lagoons in the upper Araguaia–Tocantins and middle Xingu river basins in Brazil. Most are from savanna regions, but M. gesmonei is from the Amazon rainforest.

They are small fish, up to 5 cm (2.0 in) in total length. The males are mottled or spotted orange-red and turquoise-blue, and have long, pointed fins. The much duller females have "normal" fins.

== Species ==
Maratecoara and the closely related Papiliolebias, Pituna, Plesiolebias and Stenolebias form a clade, Plesiolebiasini.

There are currently 4 recognized species in Maratecoara:

- Maratecoara formosa W. J. E. M. Costa & G. C. Brasil, 1995
- Maratecoara gesmonei D. T. B. Nielsen, Martins & Britzke, 2014
- Maratecoara lacortei Lazara, 1991
- Maratecoara splendida W. J. E. M. Costa, 2007
