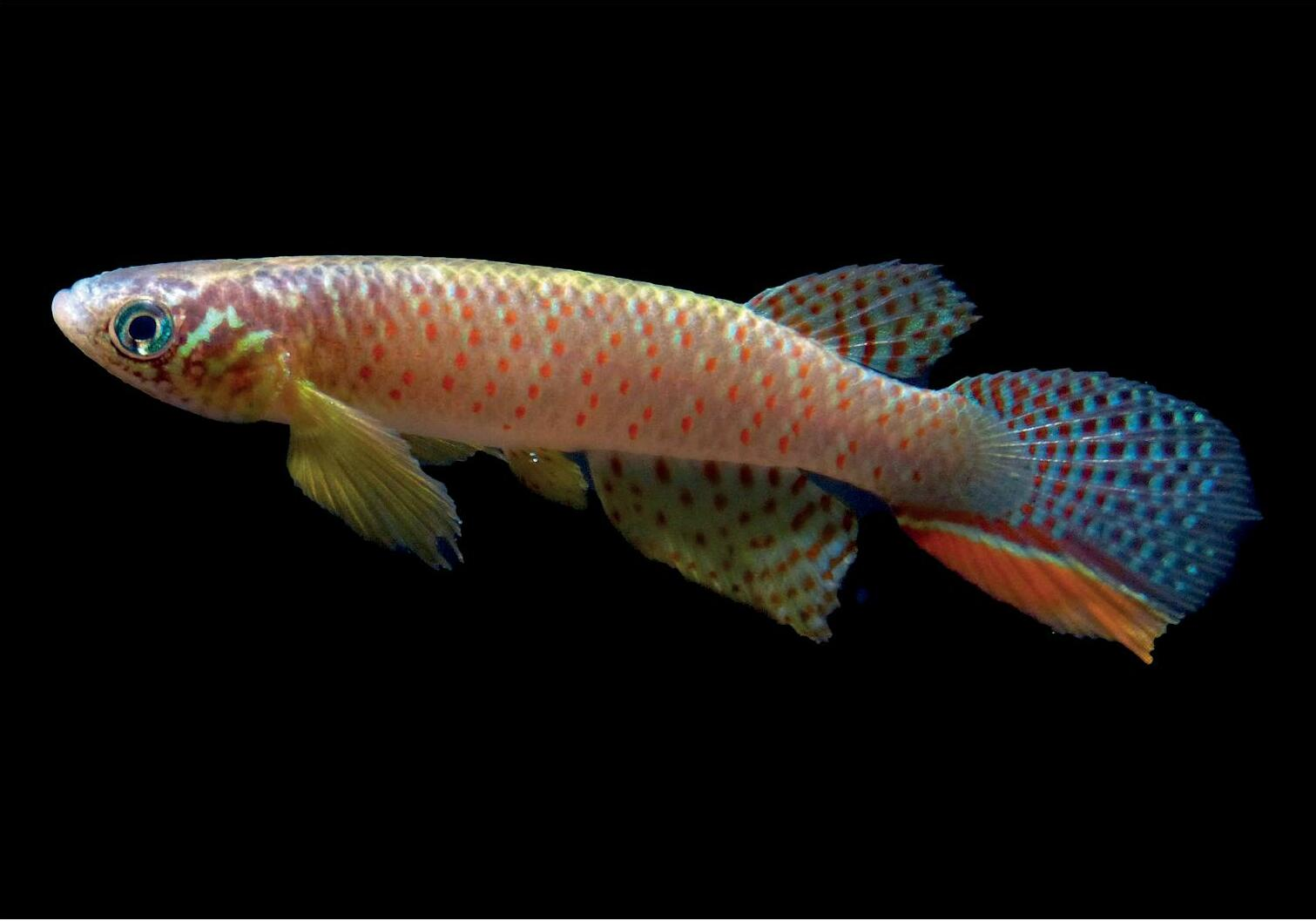
- Holotype of Moema juanderibaensis

Scientific classification
- Kingdom: Animalia
- Phylum: Chordata
- Class: Actinopterygii
- Order: Cyprinodontiformes
- Family: Rivulidae
- Genus: Moema; W. J. E. M. Costa, 1989

Type species
- Moema piriana Costa, 1989

Synonyms
- Aphyolebias Costa, 1998

= Moema (fish) =

Genus of fishes

Moema is a genus of fish in the family Rivulidae. These annual killifish are mostly restricted to the Amazon basin in Bolivia, Brazil and Peru, but a few inhabit the upper Essequibo basin in Guyana, upper Orinoco basin in Venezuela and upper Paraguay basin in Brazil. They inhabit temporary waters, such as swamps or ponds, in primary forests. Once the water disappears, the adults die, but the eggs that have been laid in the bottom remain, only hatching after 3–10 months when the water returns. They rapidly reach adult size, but generally only live a few months after hatching, although captives (not subjected to disappearing water) can live longer.

They are small fish, with the largest species up to 18 cm (7.1 in) in total length.

== Species ==
Moema was first described in 1989, having formerly been included in the Pterolebias. In 1998, it was suggested that several Moema species should be moved to their own genus, Aphyolebias. Some, including FishBase, continue to recognize both Moema and Aphyolebias. The distinction between them is not well-defined and genetic studies have shown that Moema is paraphyletic if not including Aphyolebias, leading several authorities such as Catalog of Fishes to consider the latter a junior synonym of former.

According to the Catalog of Fishes, there are currently 22 recognized species in this genus:

- Moema apurinan W. J. E. M. Costa, 2004
- Moema beltramonorum Valdesalici, 2023
- Moema beucheyi Valdesalici, D. T. B. Nielsen & Pillet, 2015
- Moema boticarioi (W. J. E. M. Costa, 2004)
- Moema claudiae (W. J. E. M. Costa, 2003)
- Moema funkneri Valdesalici, 2019
- Moema hellneri W. J. E. M. Costa, 2003
- Moema heterostigma W. J. E. M. Costa, 2003
- Moema juanderibaensis Drawert, 2022
- Moema kenwoodi Valdesalici, 2016
- Moema manuensis (W. J. E. M. Costa, 2003)
- Moema nudifrontata W. J. E. M. Costa, 2003
- Moema obliqua (W. J. E. M. Costa, Sarmiento & Barrera, 1996)
- Moema pepotei W. J. E. M. Costa, 1992
- Moema peruensis (Myers, 1954)
- Moema piriana W. J. E. M. Costa, 1989
- Moema portugali W. J. E. M. Costa, 1989
- Moema quiii Huber, 2003
- Moema rubrocaudata (Seegers, 1984)
- Moema schleseri W. J. E. M. Costa, 2003
- Moema staecki (Seegers, 1987)
- Moema wischmanni (Seegers, 1983)

Synonyms

- Moema ortegai W. J. E. M. Costa, 2003, synonym of Moema quiii Huber, 2003
