= Campellolebias =

Scientific classification
- Domain: Eukaryota
- Kingdom: Animalia
- Phylum: Chordata
- Class: Actinopterygii
- Order: Cyprinodontiformes
- Family: Rivulidae
- Genus: Campellolebias; Vaz Ferreira & Sierra de Soriano, 1974

Type species
- Campellolebias brucei Vaz-Ferreira & Sierra de Soriano, 1974

Genus of fishes

Campellolebias is a genus of killifish in the family Rivulidae from southeast Brazil. They are restricted to seasonal blackwater pools in forests in coastal parts of Santa Catarina and São Paulo states.

They are small fish, up to 5 cm (2.0 in) in total length. Uniquely among killifish, Campellolebias and the closely related Cynopoecilus have internal fertilization. A part of the males' anal fin forms a "pseudo-gonopodium" that is used for inseminating the female.

== Species ==
There are currently four recognized species in this genus:

- Campellolebias brucei Vaz Ferreira & Sierra de Soriano, 1974 (Swordfin killifish)
- Campellolebias chrysolineatus W. J. E. M. Costa, Lacerda & G. C. Brasil, 1989
- Campellolebias dorsimaculatus W. J. E. M. Costa, Lacerda & G. C. Brasil, 1989
- Campellolebias intermedius W. J. E. M. Costa & De Luca, 2006

== Etymology ==
The generic name Campellolebias is a combination of Campello, which honours the Brazilian chemical engineer, aquarist and amateur ichthyologist Gilberto Campello Brasil (1945–2008) and lebias a Greek word for a small fish which was applied to Killifish by Georges Cuvier and is now used a root for names within the order Cyprinodontiformes. Vaz Ferreira & Sierra de Soriano described Campello Brasil as an "enthusiastic scholar" of Brazilian killifishes and he also collected specimens, sending them to the Vaz Ferreira & Sierra de Soriano.
