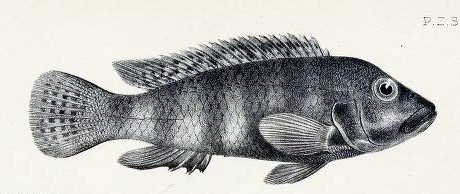

Conservation status
- Least Concern (IUCN 3.1)

Scientific classification
- Kingdom: Animalia
- Phylum: Chordata
- Class: Actinopterygii
- Order: Cichliformes
- Family: Cichlidae
- Genus: Orthochromis
- Species: O. stormsi

Binomial name
- Orthochromis stormsi (Boulenger, 1902)

Synonyms
- Schwetzochromis stormsi (Boulenger, 1902); Tilapia stormsi Boulenger, 1902; Haplochromis polyacanthus (non Boulenger, 1899) misapplied

= Orthochromis stormsi =

Species of fish

Orthochromis stormsi is a species of cichlid endemic to the Democratic Republic of the Congo, where it is known from the upper Congo River basin and Lake Mweru. It has also been reported from Pool Malebo (Stanley Pool) and the Regina Falls in the lower Congo River basin, but the identity of these populations requires further investigation. This species can reach a length of 10.2 centimetres (4.0 in) SL. The specific name honors the Belgian Army Lieutenant Maurice Joseph Auguste Marie Raphael Storms (1875-1941) who collected the type which he presented to the Brussels Museum.
