= Pituna =

Scientific classification
- Kingdom: Animalia
- Phylum: Chordata
- Class: Actinopterygii
- Order: Cyprinodontiformes
- Family: Rivulidae
- Genus: Pituna; W. J. E. M. Costa, 1989

Type species
- Pituna poranga Costa, 1989

Genus of fishes

Pituna is a genus of fish in the family Rivulidae. These annual killifish are endemic to seasonal pools, swamps and lagoons in the Araguaia–Tocantins, Xingu, uppermost Paraná and Paranaíba river basins in Brazil. Most are from savanna regions, but P. xinguensis is from the Amazon rainforest.

They are small fish, up to 4.5 cm (1.8 in) in standard length. Males are overall brownish with a spotted greenish-golden, turquoise or blue pattern, and a blue-black spot at the operculum. Females are far duller.

== Species ==
Pituna and the closely related Maratecoara, Papiliolebias, Plesiolebias and Stenolebias form a clade, Plesiolebiasini.

There are currently six recognized species in Pituna:

- Pituna brevirostrata W. J. E. M. Costa, 2007
- Pituna compacta (G. S. Myers, 1927)
- Pituna obliquoseriata W. J. E. M. Costa, 2007
- Pituna poranga W. J. E. M. Costa, 1989
- Pituna schindleri W. J. E. M. Costa, 2007
- Pituna xinguensis W. J. E. M. Costa & D. T. B. Nielsen, 2007
