= Austrofundulus =

Scientific classification
- Domain: Eukaryota
- Kingdom: Animalia
- Phylum: Chordata
- Class: Actinopterygii
- Order: Cyprinodontiformes
- Family: Rivulidae
- Genus: Austrofundulus; G. S. Myers, 1932

Type species
- Austrofundulus transilis Myers, 1932

Genus of fishes

Austrofundulus is a genus of killifish in the family Rivulidae native to northern Colombia, northern Venezuela and southwestern Guyana. They are annual killifish where adults generally have a short life in temporary ponds or swamps and the eggs experience a period of drought, only hatching when again covered by water.

They are small thickset fish, no more than 10 cm (3.9 in) in total length, and most less than half that size.

== Species ==
Austrofundulus is closely related to Rachovia, and it has been suggested that the former should be merged into the latter.

There are currently 7 recognized species of Austrofundulus:

- Austrofundulus guajira Hrbek, Taphorn & Thomerson, 2005
- Austrofundulus leohoignei Hrbek, Taphorn & Thomerson, 2005
- Austrofundulus leoni Hrbek, Taphorn & Thomerson, 2005
- Austrofundulus limnaeus L. P. Schultz, 1949
- Austrofundulus myersi Dahl, 1958
- Austrofundulus rupununi Hrbek, Taphorn & Thomerson, 2005
- Austrofundulus transilis G. S. Myers, 1932
