= Saberfin killie =

Conservation status
- Least Concern (IUCN 3.1)

Scientific classification
- Kingdom: Animalia
- Phylum: Chordata
- Class: Actinopterygii
- Order: Cyprinodontiformes
- Family: Rivulidae
- Genus: Terranatos; Taphorn & Thomerson, 1978
- Species: T. dolichopterus

Binomial name
- Terranatos dolichopterus (S. H. Weitzman & Wourms, 1967)

Synonyms
- Austrofundulus dolichopterus Weitzman & Wourms, 1967

Species of fish

The saberfin killie (Terranatos dolichopterus) is a species of killifish from the family Rivulidae endemic to the Orinoco River basin of Venezuela. This annual killifish grows to 4 cm (1.6 in) in total length. This species is the only known member of its genus. This species is also found in the aquarium trade.
