= Prorivulus =

Conservation status
- Data Deficient (IUCN 3.1)

Scientific classification
- Kingdom: Animalia
- Phylum: Chordata
- Class: Actinopterygii
- Order: Cyprinodontiformes
- Family: Rivulidae
- Genus: Prorivulus; W. J. E. M. Costa, S. M. Q. Lima & Suzart, 2004
- Species: P. auriferus

Binomial name
- Prorivulus auriferus W. J. E. M. Costa, S. M. Q. Lima & Suzart, 2004

Species of fish

Prorivulus auriferus is a genus of fish in the family Rivulidae. It is only known from a small freshwater creek near the coast in the Valença, Bahia region in Brazil. This species is the only known member of its genus. This small killifish is up to about 3 cm (1.2 in) in standard length. Males are overall yellowish, while the smaller females are duller in color.
