= Llanolebias =

Scientific classification
- Kingdom: Animalia
- Phylum: Chordata
- Class: Actinopterygii
- Order: Cyprinodontiformes
- Family: Rivulidae
- Genus: Llanolebias; Hrbek & Taphorn, 2008
- Species: L. stellifer

Binomial name
- Llanolebias stellifer (Thomerson & B. J. Turner, 1973)

Synonyms
- Rachovia stellifer Thomerson & Turner, 1973; Rivulus stellifer Thomerson & Turner, 1973

Species of fish

Llanolebias stellifer is a species of killifish in the family Rivulidae. It is endemic to the Llanos, a part of the Orinoco basin in Venezuela, where it lives in shallow temporary waters (like ponds) in forests. This annual killifish grows to a total length of 7.5 cm (3.0 in). It is the only known member of its genus, but it was formerly included in Rachovia.
