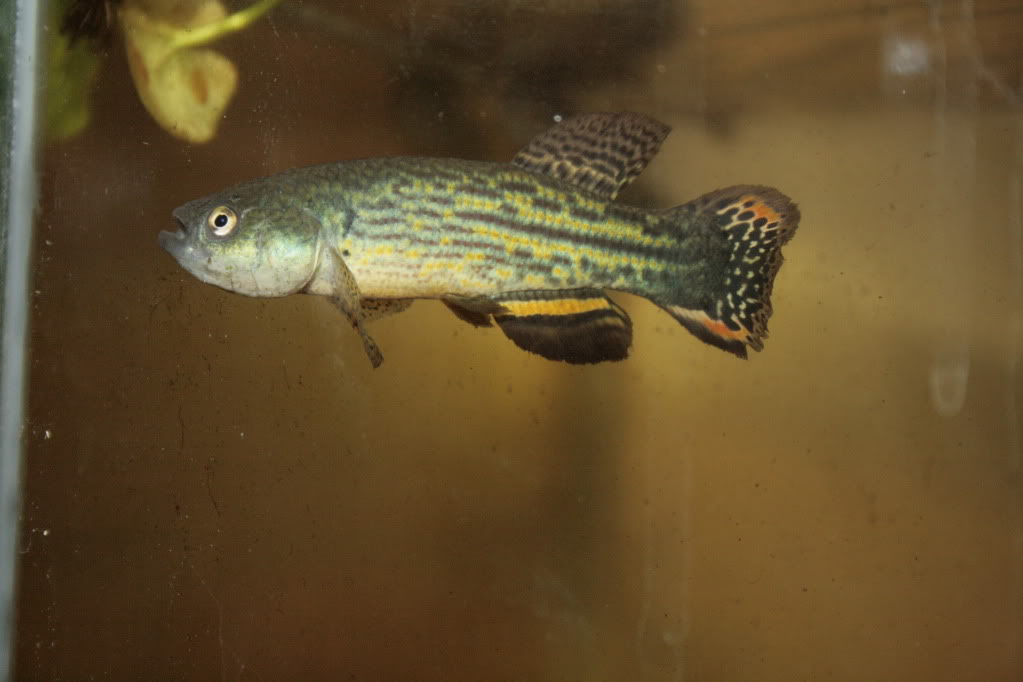
- Neofundulus paraguayensis

Scientific classification
- Kingdom: Animalia
- Phylum: Chordata
- Class: Actinopterygii
- Order: Cyprinodontiformes
- Family: Rivulidae
- Genus: Neofundulus; G. S. Myers, 1924

Type species
- Fundulus paraguayensis C. H. Eigenmann & C. H. Kennedy, 1903

= Neofundulus =

Genus of fishes

Neofundulus is a genus of fish in the family Rivulidae. These annual killifish are endemic to the Paraguay, Guaporé, Mamoré and São Francisco basins in Argentina, Bolivia, Brazil and Paraguay. They inhabit temporary waters, such as swamps or ponds, that typically are located in open habitats like grassland. Once the water disappears, the adults die, but the eggs that have been laid in the bottom remain, only hatching after several months when the water returns.

They are small fish, with the largest species up to 7.5 cm (3.0 in) in total length.

== Species ==
There are currently 7 recognized species in this genus:

- Neofundulus acutirostratus W. J. E. M. Costa, 1992
- Neofundulus aureomaculatus W. J. E. M. Costa, 2015
- Neofundulus guaporensis W. J. E. M. Costa, 1988
- Neofundulus paraguayensis (C. H. Eigenmann & C. H. Kennedy, 1903)
- Neofundulus parvipinnis W. J. E. M. Costa, 1988
- Neofundulus rubrofasciatus W. J. E. M. Costa, 2015
- Neofundulus splendidus D. T. B. Nielsen & Brousseau, 2013

Synonyms

- Neofundulus ornatipinnis G. S. Myers, 1935, synonym of Neofundulus paraguayensis (Eigenmann & Kennedy, 1903)
