= Orthochromis torrenticola =

Conservation status
- Least Concern (IUCN 3.1)

Scientific classification
- Kingdom: Animalia
- Phylum: Chordata
- Class: Actinopterygii
- Order: Cichliformes
- Family: Cichlidae
- Genus: Orthochromis
- Species: O. torrenticola

Binomial name
- Orthochromis torrenticola (Thys van den Audenaerde, 1963)

Synonyms
- Rheohaplochromis torrenticola (Thys van den Audenaerde, 1963); Schwetzochromis torrenticola (Thys van den Audenaerde, 1963); Haplochromis torrenticola Thys van den Audenaerde, 1963; Haplochromis rheophilus Thys van den Audenaerde, 1963

Species of fish

Orthochromis torrenticola is a species of cichlid endemic to the Democratic Republic of the Congo, where it is known from the Lufira drainage in the upper Congo River basin. This species can reach a length of 8.1 centimetres (3.2 in) SL.
