= Orthochromis luongoensis =

Conservation status
- Endangered (IUCN 3.1)

Scientific classification
- Kingdom: Animalia
- Phylum: Chordata
- Class: Actinopterygii
- Order: Cichliformes
- Family: Cichlidae
- Genus: Orthochromis
- Species: O. luongoensis

Binomial name
- Orthochromis luongoensis (Greenwood & Kullander, 1994)

Synonyms
- Schwetzochromis luongoensis Greenwood & Kullander, 1994

Species of fish

Orthochromis luongoensis is a species of cichlid endemic to Zambia, where it is only known from the Luongo River, a tributary of the Luapula in the upper Congo River basin. This species can reach a length of 6.3 centimetres (2.5 in) SL.
