= Micromoema =

Conservation status
- Least Concern (IUCN 3.1)

Scientific classification
- Kingdom: Animalia
- Phylum: Chordata
- Class: Actinopterygii
- Order: Cyprinodontiformes
- Family: Rivulidae
- Genus: Micromoema; W. J. E. M. Costa, 1998
- Species: M. xiphophora

Binomial name
- Micromoema xiphophora (Thomerson & Taphorn, 1992)

Synonyms
- Pterolebias xiphophorus Thomerson & Taphorn, 1992; Micromoema xiphophorus (Thomerson & Taphorn, 1992)

Species of fish

Micromoema xiphophora is a species of killifish from the family Rivulidae endemic to the Orinoco River basin in Venezuela where it is found in small pools in the forest. This annual killifish grows to a total length of 6 cm (2.4 in). This species is the only known member of its genus.
