= Trigonectes =

Scientific classification
- Kingdom: Animalia
- Phylum: Chordata
- Class: Actinopterygii
- Order: Cyprinodontiformes
- Family: Rivulidae
- Genus: Trigonectes; G. S. Myers, 1925

Type species
- Trigonectes strigabundus Myers 1925

Genus of fishes

Trigonectes is a genus of fish in the family Rivulidae. These annual killifish are endemic to the Paraguay River, upper Madeira (Beni, Guaporé and Mamoré) and Tocantins basins in far northern Argentina, Bolivia, central Brazil and western Paraguay. They inhabit seasonal swamps, pools and similar habitats in open regions (for example, savanna). Once the water disappears, the adults die, but the eggs that have been laid in the bottom remain, only hatching after several months (up to a year) when the water returns.

Trigonectes are relatively large killifish that are up to 8–16 cm (3.1–6.3 in) in total length depending on the exact species.

== Species ==
There are currently 6 species in this genus:

- Trigonectes aplocheiloides Huber, 1995
- Trigonectes balzanii (Perugia, 1891)
- Trigonectes macrophthalmus W. J. E. M. Costa, 1990
- Trigonectes rogoaguae (N. E. Pearson & G. S. Myers, 1924)
- Trigonectes rubromarginatus W. J. E. M. Costa, 1990
- Trigonectes strigabundus G. S. Myers, 1925
