= Pterolebias =

Scientific classification
- Kingdom: Animalia
- Phylum: Chordata
- Class: Actinopterygii
- Order: Cyprinodontiformes
- Family: Rivulidae
- Genus: Pterolebias; Garman, 1895

Type species
- Pterolebias longipinnis Garman, 1895

Synonyms
- Gnatholebias W. J. E. M. Costa, 1998

Genus of fishes

Pterolebias is a genus of killifish from the family Rivulidae which are native to temporary swamps and ponds in South America. It includes two groups, which sometimes are regarded as separate genera: Pterolebias (sensu stricto) from the southern Amazon and Paraguay (including the Pantanal) river basins, and Gnatholebias from the Orinoco (including the Llanos) river basin.

Depending on the exact species, these annual killifish reach up to 7–12 cm (2.8–4.7 in) in total length.

== Species ==
There are four recognized species in Pterolebias according to FishBase, but two of these are sometimes placed in a separate genus, Gnatholebias. The two groups are relatively distantly related and if kept in a single genus Pterolebias is paraphyletic.

- Pterolebias (sensu stricto)
  - Pterolebias longipinnis Garman, 1895 (Longfin killie)
  - Pterolebias phasianus W. J. E. M. Costa, 1988
- Gnatholebias
  - Pterolebias hoignei Thomerson, 1974
  - Pterolebias zonatus G. S. Myers, 1935
