= Mexican rivulus =

Conservation status
- Endangered (IUCN 3.1)

Scientific classification
- Kingdom: Animalia
- Phylum: Chordata
- Class: Actinopterygii
- Order: Cyprinodontiformes
- Family: Rivulidae
- Genus: Millerichthys; W. J. E. M. Costa, 1995
- Species: M. robustus

Binomial name
- Millerichthys robustus (R. R. Miller & C. L. Hubbs, 1974)

Synonyms
- Rivulus robustus Miller & Hubbs, 1974

Species of fish

The Mexican rivulus (Millerichthys robustus) is a species of killifish from the family Rivulidae which is endemic to Mexico where it is found in the Papaloapan and Coatzacoalcos River basins. This annual killifish grows to a total length of 4 cm (1.6 in). It is the only known species in its genus, but its exact taxonomic position remains uncertain, as it has not been included in any phylogenetic study. This species was described by Robert Rush Miller and Carl Leavitt Hubbs as Rivulus robustus in 1974, it was reclassified in the monotypic genus Millerichthys in 1995, the generic name honouring Robert Rush Miller.
