= Arachania, Rocha =

Arachania
- village
- Location within Uruguay
- Coordinates: 34°36′55″S 54°9′0″W
- Country: Uruguay
- Department: Rocha Department
- Elevation: 20 m (66 ft)

Population (2011)
  - Total: 377

Arachania is a village in the Rocha Department of Uruguay.

== Location ==
The town is located in the southern part of the Rocha department, on the Atlantic coast, and next to Route 10 at km 225. It borders the Antoniópolis resort to the southwest, and the Diamante de la Pedrera resort to the northeast.
