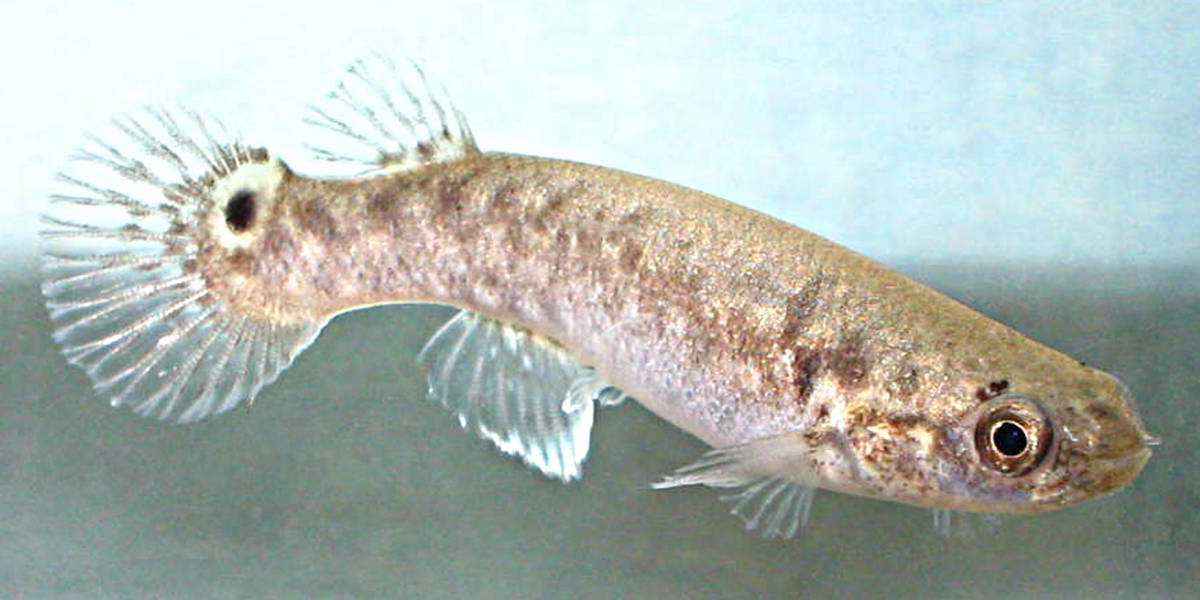

Conservation status
- Least Concern (IUCN 3.1)

Scientific classification
- Kingdom: Animalia
- Phylum: Chordata
- Class: Actinopterygii
- Division: Teleostei
- Order: Cyprinodontiformes
- Family: Rivulidae
- Genus: Kryptolebias
- Species: K. marmoratus

Binomial name
- Kryptolebias marmoratus (Poey, 1880)

Synonyms
- Rivulus marmoratus Poey, 1880; Rivulus heyei Nichols, 1914; Rivulus bonairensis Hoedeman, 1958; Rivulus garciai de la Cruz & Dubitsky, 1976

= Mangrove rivulus =

Species of fish

The mangrove rivulus or mangrove killifish, Kryptolebias marmoratus (syn. Rivulus marmoratus), is a species of killifish in the family Rivulidae. It lives in brackish and marine waters (less frequently in fresh water) along the coasts of Florida, through the Antilles, and along the eastern and northern Atlantic coasts of Mexico, Central America and South America (south to Brazil). It has a very wide tolerance of both salinity (0–68 ‰) and temperature (12–38 °C or 54–100 °F), can survive for about two months on land, and mostly breeds by self-fertilization. It is typically found in areas with red mangrove and sometimes lives in burrows of Cardisoma guanhumi crabs.

The mangrove rivulus is up to 7.5 cm (3.0 in) long, but most individuals are 1–3.8 cm (0.4–1.5 in).

Overall the mangrove rivulus is widespread and not threatened, but in the United States it is considered a Species of Concern by the National Marine Fisheries Service.

== Ecology ==
=== Land living ===
The mangrove rivulus can spend up to 66 consecutive days out of water, which it typically spends inside fallen logs, breathing air through its skin. It enters burrows created by insects inside trees where it relaxes its territorial, aggressive behavior. During this time, it alters its gills so it can retain water and nutrients, while nitrogen waste is excreted through the skin. The change is reversed once it re-enters the water.

When jumping on land, the mangrove rivulus does a "tail flip", flipping its head over its body towards the tail end. The rivulus' jumping technique gives it an ability to direct its jumps on land and to make relatively forceful jumps. A team of scientists associated with the Society for Experimental Biology released a video in 2013 showing the jumping technique.

=== Breeding ===
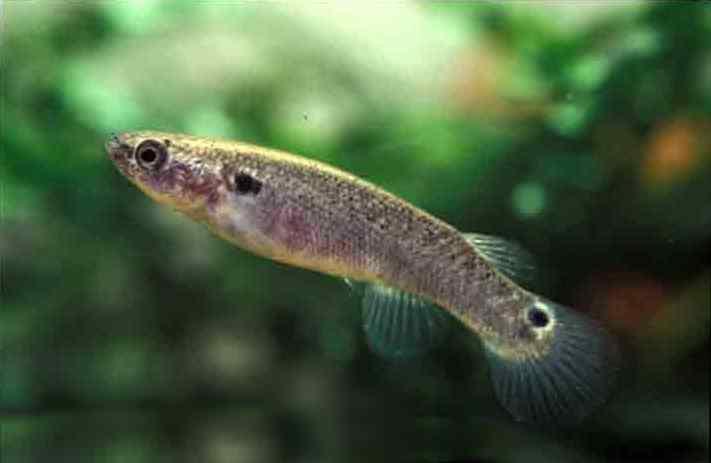
Mangrove rivulus in Guadeloupe

Spawning has not yet been observed in the wild in the mangrove rivulus, but captive studies show that the eggs are positioned in shallow water, sometimes even in places that periodically are on land during low tide. The eggs can continue their development when out of water, but once they are ready to hatch this is delayed until again submerged.

The species consists mostly of hermaphrodites which are known to reproduce by self-fertilization, but males do exist, and strong genetic evidence indicates occasional outcrossing. The concentration of males to hermaphrodites can vary depending on the local requirement for genetic diversity (for example, if an increase in the local parasite population occurred, secondary male numbers might increase). In Florida, almost all (>99%) are homozygous clones, but in highly colonized South and Central American pools males typically are 3 to 8% of the population, and in offshore cays in Belize 20 to 25% are males.

K. marmoratus produces eggs and sperm by meiosis and routinely reproduces by self-fertilization. Each individual hermaphrodite normally fertilizes itself when an egg and sperm that it has produced by an internal organ unite inside the fish's body. In nature, this mode of reproduction can yield highly homozygous lines composed of individuals so genetically uniform as to be, in effect, identical to one another. The capacity for self-fertilization in these fishes has apparently persisted for at least several hundred thousand years. Meioses that lead to self-fertilization can reduce genetic fitness by causing inbreeding depression. However, self-fertilization does provide the benefit of "fertilization assurance" (reproductive assurance) at each generation. Meiosis can also provide the adaptive benefit of efficient recombinational repair of DNA damages during formation of germ cells at each generation. This benefit may have prevented the evolutionary replacement of meiosis and selfing by a simpler type of clonal reproduction such as ameiotic or apomictic parthenogenesis. Adults may cannibalize juveniles, but only unrelated offspring.

== Epigenetic studies ==
Because K. marmoratus can reproduce consistently by self-fertilization, it gives rise to isogenic lineages. These lineages afford the opportunity to explicitly investigate epigenetic phenotypic effects in genetically identical individuals. Epigenetic changes due to DNA methylation were studied, and specific patterns of DNA methylation at CpG sites in adults and during development were found to occur.

== Conservation ==
Overall the mangrove rivulus is widespread and not threatened, but in the United States it is considered a Species of Concern by the National Marine Fisheries Service. It is considered a species of Least Concern by the IUCN, and was formerly listed as a species of special concern in Florida, but has since been delisted. It was formerly often overlooked and considered rare in Florida, but surveys have revealed that it is locally common in this state and abundant in the Florida Keys. It is considered vulnerable by the American Fisheries Society.

The mangrove rivulus is considered to have potential as a bioindicator species of estuary habitats.

== See also ==
- Amphibious fish
- Androdioecy
- Climbing gourami
- Mudskipper
- Walking catfish
- Walking fish
