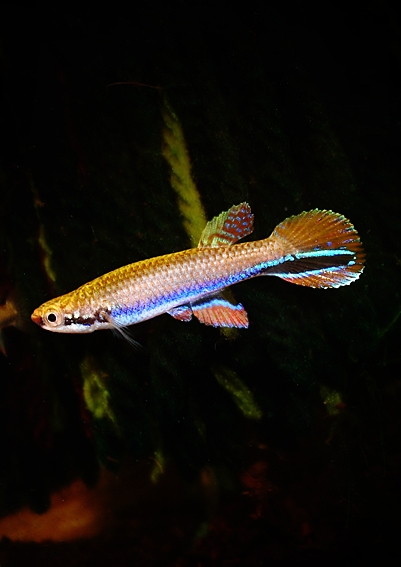
- Laimosemion xiphidius

Scientific classification
- Kingdom: Animalia
- Phylum: Chordata
- Class: Actinopterygii
- Order: Cyprinodontiformes
- Family: Rivulidae
- Genus: Laimosemion; Huber, 1999

Type species
- Rivulus geayi Vaillant, 1899

Synonyms
- Owiyeye Costa, 2006

= Laimosemion =

Genus of fishes

Laimosemion is a genus of fish in the family Rivulidae from the Amazon basin and basins in the Guiana Shield in tropical South America. They mostly inhabit small streams, creeks, swamps and pools in lowlands, but locally occur to an altitude of 1,300 m (4,300 ft).

Like their relatives, the adult Laimosemion often inhabit very small isolated waters, but they are not annual species like some other killifish. The adults can move some distance over land to find another water source. They do this by repeatedly flipping their body. They commonly complete their life cycle in the water, often laying their eggs among plant material. However, their eggs can survive several days of drought, only hatching when again covered by water.

The largest are up to 8.5 cm (3.3 in) in total length, but most Laimosemion species only reach around half that size.

== Species ==
Until 2011, Laimosemion were included in Rivulus, and some prefer to maintain them in that genus.

If recognized as a valid genus, there are currently 35 species in Laimosemion:

- Laimosemiion agilae (Hoedeman, 1954)
- Laimosemion altivelis (Huber, 1992)
- Laimosemion amanapira (W. J. E. M. Costa, 2004)
- Laimosemion anitae D. T. B. Nielsen, Jan Willem Hoetmer and Eric Vandekerkhove,
- Laimosemion breviceps (C. H. Eigenmann, 1909)
- Laimosemion carolinae (Vermeulen & Mejia-Vargas, 2020)
- Laimosemion cladophorus (Huber, 1991)
- Laimosemion dibaphus (G. S. Myers, 1927)
- Laimosemion flammaecauda (Vermeulen & Mejia-Vargas, 2020)
- Laimosemion foliiscola (Vermeulen & Mejia-Vargas, 2020)
- Laimosemion frenatum (C. H. Eigenmann, 1912)
- Laimosemion geayi (Vaillant, 1899)
- Laimosemion gili Valdesalici & Nielsen, 2017
- Laimosemion gransabanae (Lasso A., Taphorn & Thomerson, 1992)
- Laimosemion jauaperi W. J. E. M. Costa & Bragança, 2013
- Laimosemion kirovskyi (W. J. E. M. Costa, 2004)
- Laimosemion leticia Valdesalici, 2016
- Laimosemion lyricauda (Thomerson, Berkenkamp & Taphorn, 1991)
- Laimosemion mabura Valdesalici & García-Gil, 2015
- Laimosemion mahdiaense (Suijker & Collier, 2006)
- Laimosemion nicoi (Thomerson & Taphorn, 1992)
- Laimosemion paryagi Vermeulen, Suijker & Collier, 2012 (Paryag's killifish)
- Laimosemion rectocaudatum (Fels & de Rham, 1981)
- Laimosemion roemeri (W. J. E. M. Costa, 2003)
- Laimosemion sape (Lasso-Alcalá, Taphorn, Lasso A. & León-Mata, 2006)
- Laimosemion sladkowskii (Vermeulen, 2023)
- Laimosemion staecki (I. Schindler & Valdesalici, 2011)
- Laimosemion strigatum (Regan, 1912)
- Laimosemion tecminae (Thomerson, Nico & Taphorn, 1992)
- Laimosemion tomasi (Vermeulen, Valdesalici & Garcia-Gil, 2013)
- Laimosemion torrenticola (Vermeulen & Isbrücker, 2000)
- Laimosemion uakti (W. J. E. M. Costa, 2004)
- Laimosemion uatuman (W. J. E. M. Costa, 2004)
- Laimosemion ubim W. J. E. M. Costa & Lazzarotto, 2014
- Laimosemion xiphidius (Huber, 1979)
