= Lothar Seegers =

German ichthyologist

Lothar Seegers (3 October 1947 – 6 August 2018) was a German ichthyologist. Seegers authored 9 species within the family of Rivulidae.

== Publications (selection) ==
- The Fishes of the Lake Rukwa Drainage. Koninklijk Museum voor Midden-Afrika, 1996. ISBN 9075894031, 9789075894035
- Killifishes of the world: Old World Killis II. A.C.S. GmbH, 1997. ISBN 3931702308, 9783931702304
- Killifishes of the World: New World Killis. A.C.S., 2000. ISBN 3931702766, 9783931702762
- The catfishes of Africa: A Handbook for Identification and Maintenance. Aqualog Verlag, 2008. ISBN 3936027838, 9783936027839

== See also ==
- Category:Taxa named by Lothar Seegers
