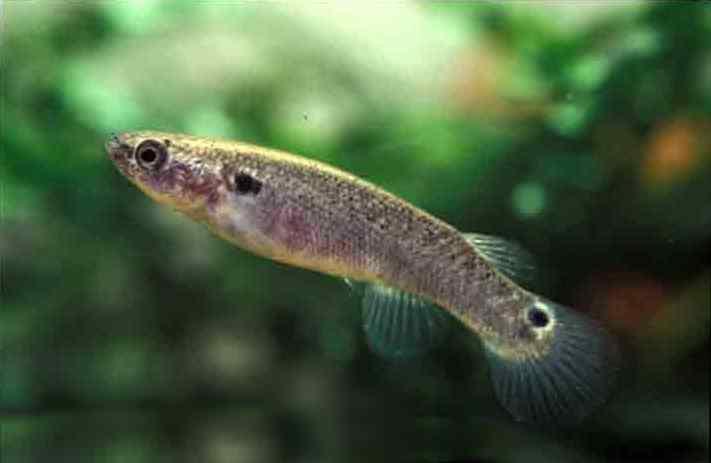
- Hermaphrodite Kryptolebias marmoratus

Scientific classification
- Kingdom: Animalia
- Phylum: Chordata
- Class: Actinopterygii
- Order: Cyprinodontiformes
- Suborder: Aplocheiloidei
- Family: Rivulidae; Myers, 1925

Genera
- See text

Synonyms
- Cynolebiidae Hoedeman 1961

= Rivulidae =

Family of fishes

The Rivulidae are a family of killifishes in the order Cyprinodontiformes. They are commonly known as rivulids, South American killifish or New World killifish. The latter names are slightly misleading, however, as they are neither restricted to South America, though most are in fact found there, nor are they the only killifishes from the Americas. Occasionally, they are still referred to as rivulines, a term dating back to when they were considered a subfamily of the Aplocheilidae.

The subfamilial name "Rivulinae" was already established for noctuid moths by Augustus Radcliffe Grote in 1895. That name, though it is the senior homonym, may be suppressed because the name Rivulinae for the fish subfamily is widespread, whereas the moth taxon is little used. The use of Rivulidae as the name for this family may need to be ruled in by the International Commission on Zoological Nomenclature. The alternative family-group name Cynolebiidae Hoedeman 1961 has been proposed as an alternative to Rivulidae.

Costa unified the three families within the suborder Aplocheiloidei into a single family Aplocheilidae, with the subfamilies Aplocheilinae, Nothobranchiinae and the Cynolebiinae. However, the 5th edition of Fishes of the World retains the three families Aplocheilidae, Nothobranchiidae and Rivulidae.

== Genera ==
The following genera are classified in the family Rivulidae: The taxonomy of this family is subject to some discussion among workers and some of the listed genera are considered to be paraphyletic, for example it has been posited that Leptolebias is paraphyletic if the species placed in Leptopanchax are retained within it, as per Fishbase.

- Anablepsoides Huber, 1992
- Aphyolebias Costa, 1998
- Atlantirivulus Costa, 2008
- Austrofundulus Myers, 1932
- Austrolebias Costa, 1998
- Campellolebias Vaz-Ferreira & Sierra de Soriano, 1974
- Cynodonichthys Meek, 1904
- Cynolebias Steindachner, 1876
- Cynopoecilus Regan, 1912
- Gnatholebias Costa, 1998
- Hypsolebias Costa, 2006
- Kryptolebias Costa, 2004
- Laimosemion Huber, 1999
- Leptolebias Myers, 1952
- Llanolebias Hrbek & Taphorn, 2008
- Maratecoara Costa, 1995
- Melanorivulus Costa, 2006
- Micromoema Costa, 1998
- Millerichthys Costa, 1995
- Moema Costa, 1989
- Mucurilebias Costa, 2014
- Nematolebias Costa, 1998
- Neofundulus Myers, 1924
- Notholebias Costa, 2008
- Ophthalmolebias Costa, 2006
- Papiliolebias Costa, 1998
- Pituna Costa, 1989
- Plesiolebias Costa, 1989
- Prorivulus Costa, Lima & Suzart, 2004
- Pterolebias Garman, 1895
- Rachovia Myers, 1927
- Renova Thomerson & Taphorn, 1995
- Rivulus Poey, 1860
- Simpsonichthys Carvalho, 1959
- Spectrolebias Costa & Nielsen, 1997
- Stenolebias Costa, 1995
- Terranatos Taphorn & Thomerson, 1978
- Trigonectes Myers, 1925
- Xenurolebias Costa, 2006
