= Annual tropical killifish =

Annual tropical killifish is a common name for several fishes and may refer to:

- Leptolebias marmoratus
- Leptolebias opalescens
- Leptolebias splendens
