= Nematolebias =

Scientific classification
- Kingdom: Animalia
- Phylum: Chordata
- Class: Actinopterygii
- Order: Cyprinodontiformes
- Family: Rivulidae
- Genus: Nematolebias; W. J. E. M. Costa, 1998

Type species
- Cynolebias whitei G. S. Myers, 1942

Genus of fishes

Nematolebias is a genus of fish in the family Rivulidae. These threatened annual killifish are endemic temporary waters, like pools, in the Atlantic Forest in Rio de Janeiro state, Brazil (the equally threatened killifish genera Leptolebias and Notholebias are restricted to the same state).

They are small fish that are up to 8 cm (3.1 in) in total length. Like other killifish, the males are more colorful than females.

== Species ==
There are currently three recognized species in this genus:

- Nematolebias catimbau W. J. E. M. Costa, Amorim & Aranha, 2014
- Nematolebias papilliferus W. J. E. M. Costa, 2002
- Nematolebias whitei G. S. Myers, 1942 (Rio pearlfish)
