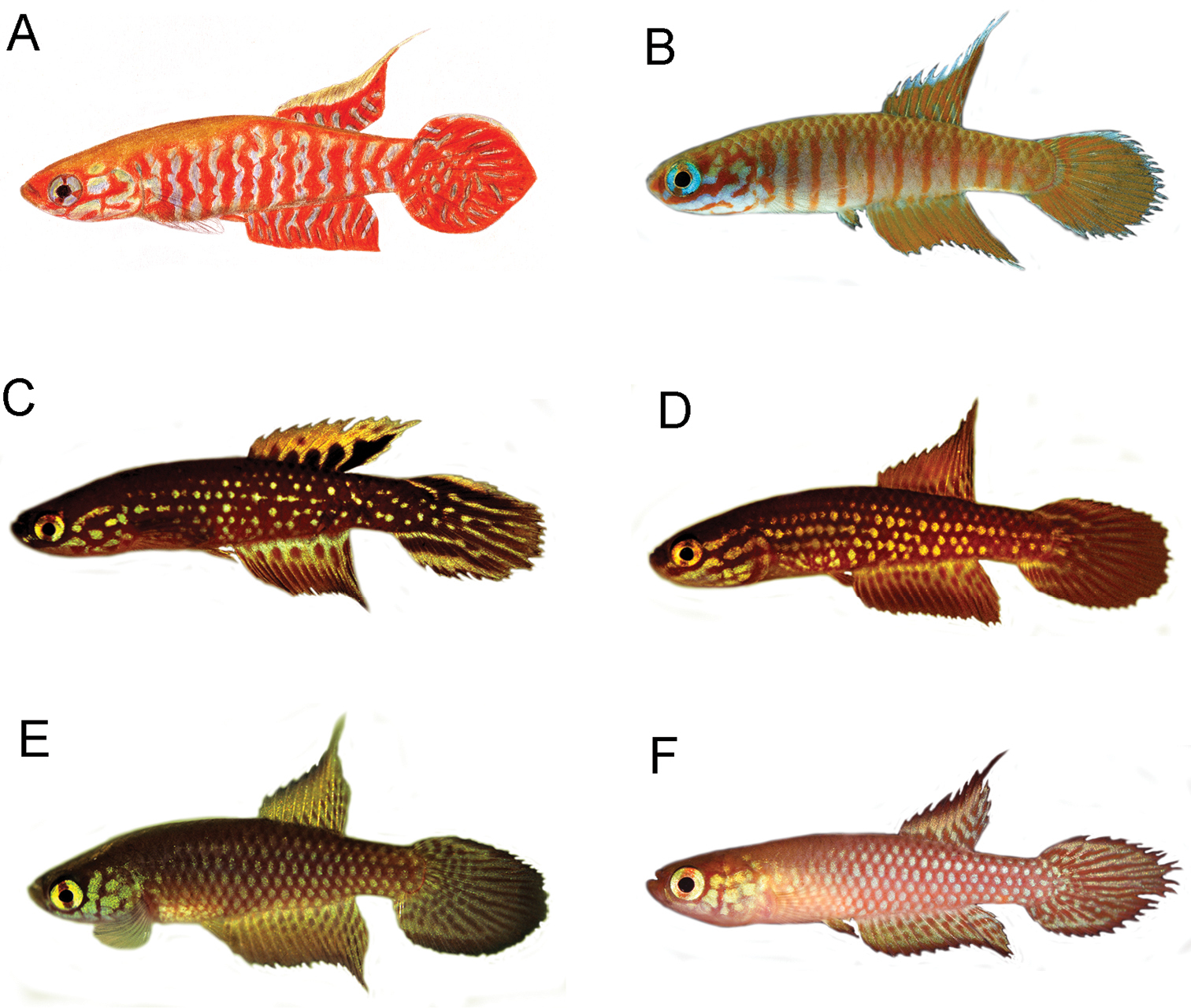
- A) L. sanguineus B) L. splendens C) L. aureoguttatus D) L. itanhaensis E) L. citrinipinnis F) L. opalescens

Scientific classification
- Kingdom: Animalia
- Phylum: Chordata
- Class: Actinopterygii
- Order: Cyprinodontiformes
- Family: Rivulidae
- Genus: Leptopanchax; W. J. E. M. Costa, 2016

Type species
- Cynolebias citrinipinnis Costa, Lacerda & Tanizaki, 1988

= Leptopanchax =

Genus of fishes

Leptopanchax is a genus of small fish, up to 5 cm (2.0 in) long, in the family Rivulidae. They are found in southeastern Brazil from Paraná to Rio de Janeiro. Depending on the exact species, they inhabit small seasonal channels in the Atlantic rainforest or temporary pools in open habitats. Several Leptopanchax species are very rare and L. sanguineus is possibly extinct.

== Species ==
The species in Leptopanchax were formerly included in Leptolebias, but this makes the latter genus paraphyletic, although they are still placed in that genus by Fishbase.

There are currently 6 recognized species in Leptopanchax:

- Leptopanchax aureoguttatus (da Cruz, 1974)
- Leptopanchax citrinipinnis (W. J. E. M. Costa, Lacerda & Tanizaki, 1988)
- Leptopanchax itanhaensis (W. J. E. M. Costa, 2008)
- Leptopanchax opalescens (G. S. Myers, 1942)
- Leptopanchax sanguineus W. J. E. M. Costa, 2019 – possibly extinct
- Leptopanchax splendens (G. S. Myers, 1942)
