= Leptolebias marmoratus =

Conservation status
- Critically Endangered (IUCN 3.1)

Scientific classification
- Kingdom: Animalia
- Phylum: Chordata
- Class: Actinopterygii
- Order: Cyprinodontiformes
- Family: Rivulidae
- Genus: Leptolebias
- Species: L. marmoratus

Binomial name
- Leptolebias marmoratus (Ladiges, 1934)

Synonyms
- Cynolebias marmoratus (Ladiges, 1934); Cynopoecilus marmoratus Ladiges, 1934

Species of fish

Leptolebias marmoratus, the marbled pearlfish, annual tropical killifish or ginger pearlfish, is a species of killifish in the family Rivulidae. This threatened species is found in temporary channels within dense Atlantic rainforest, in the floodplains of rivers draining into the Baía de Guanabara, near the city of Rio de Janeiro in southeastern Brazil. It reaches up to 3 cm (1.2 in) in total length.

This species may be the only member of its genus, the inclusion of several others made Leptolebias paraphyletic, according to some workers. To avoid this, some authorities moved the other species to Leptopanchax, Mucurilebias and Notholebias.

== Taxonomy ==
Leptolebias marmoratus belongs to the family Rivulidae. It was first described by George S. Myers in 1942. The genus Leptolebias includes several species that are closely related and share similar ecological niches.

== Physical description ==
Leptolebias marmoratus is a small fish, with males typically more colorful than females. Males exhibit bright blue and red patterns on their bodies and fins, while females are more subdued in coloration. The species exhibits sexual dimorphism, with males also having longer fins.

== Habitat and distribution ==
Leptolebias marmoratus is endemic to the Atlantic Forest biome in southeastern Brazil. It inhabits temporary pools that form during the rainy season. These pools often dry up completely, which has led to the species developing a unique life cycle adapted to these conditions.

== Life cycle and reproduction ==
The life cycle of Leptolebias marmoratus is closely tied to the wet and dry seasons. During the rainy season, adults breed in the temporary pools, and eggs are laid in the substrate. These eggs enter a state of diapause during the dry season, hatching when the pools refill with water in the next rainy season.

== Behaviour ==
Leptolebias marmoratus exhibits interesting behaviors related to its reproductive strategy. Males engage in elaborate courtship displays to attract females. Males engage in elaborate courtship displays to attract females. The species is also known for its ability to survive in hypoxic conditions, which is common in its temporary pool habitat.

== Conservation status ==
Leptolebias marmoratus is considered to be at risk due to habitat loss and environmental changes. The destruction of the Atlantic Forest for agriculture and urban development poses a significant threat to the species. Conservation efforts are focused on preserving its natural habitat and studying its life history to support breeding programs.
