= Simpsonichthys fasciatus =

Conservation status
- Vulnerable (IUCN 3.1)

Scientific classification
- Kingdom: Animalia
- Phylum: Chordata
- Class: Actinopterygii
- Order: Cyprinodontiformes
- Family: Rivulidae
- Genus: Simpsonichthys
- Species: S. fasciatus

Binomial name
- Simpsonichthys fasciatus W. J. E. M. Costa & G. C. Brasil, 2006

Synonyms
- Hypsolebias fasciatus (Costa & Brasil, 2006)

Species of killifish

Simpsonichthys fasciatus is a species of killifish in the family Rivulidae. It is found in the Paracatu River drainage of the São Francisco River basin, Brazil.
