= Simpsonichthys punctulatus =

Conservation status
- Vulnerable (IUCN 3.1)

Scientific classification
- Kingdom: Animalia
- Phylum: Chordata
- Class: Actinopterygii
- Order: Cyprinodontiformes
- Family: Rivulidae
- Genus: Simpsonichthys
- Species: S. punctulatus

Binomial name
- Simpsonichthys punctulatus W. J. E. M. Costa & G. C. Brasil, 2007

Species of killifish

Simpsonichthys punctulatus is a species of killifish in the family Rivulidae. It is found in temporary canals of the upper Paracatu drainage, in the São Francisco River basin, Brazil.

== Description ==
Simpsonichthys punctulatus reaches a standard length of 2.9 cm (1.1 in).
