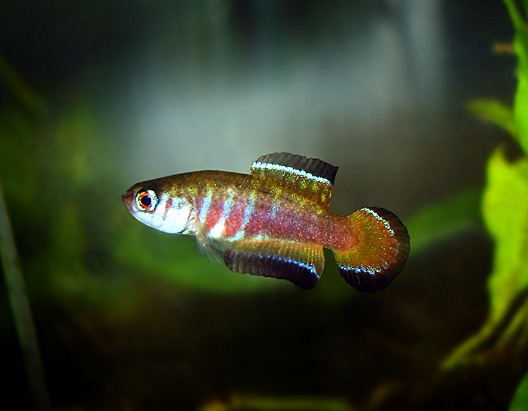

Conservation status
- Vulnerable (IUCN 3.1)

Scientific classification
- Kingdom: Animalia
- Phylum: Chordata
- Class: Actinopterygii
- Order: Cyprinodontiformes
- Family: Rivulidae
- Genus: Simpsonichthys
- Species: S. nigromaculatus

Binomial name
- Simpsonichthys nigromaculatus W. J. E. M. Costa, 2007

= Simpsonichthys nigromaculatus =

Species of killifish

Simpsonichthys nigromaculatus is a species of killifish in the family Rivulidae. It is found in the seasonal canals of floodplains of the Rio da Pratain in the Rio Aporé drainage in the upper Paraná basin, Brazil.

== Description ==
Simpsonichthys nigromaculatus reaches a standard length of 2.6 cm (1.0 in).
