= Simpsonichthys marginatus =

Conservation status
- Critically Endangered (IUCN 3.1)

Scientific classification
- Kingdom: Animalia
- Phylum: Chordata
- Class: Actinopterygii
- Order: Cyprinodontiformes
- Family: Rivulidae
- Genus: Simpsonichthys
- Species: S. marginatus

Binomial name
- Simpsonichthys marginatus W. J. E. M. Costa & G. C. Brasil, 1996

Synonyms
- Hypsolebias marginatus (Costa & Brasil, 1996)

Species of killifish

Simpsonichthys marginatus is a species of killifish from the family Rivulidae. It is found in the São Francisco River basin, Brazil.

== Description ==
Simpsonichthys marginatus reaches a standard length of 6.0 cm (2.4 in).
