= Simpsonichthys perpendicularis =

Conservation status
- Critically Endangered (IUCN 3.1)

Scientific classification
- Kingdom: Animalia
- Phylum: Chordata
- Class: Actinopterygii
- Order: Cyprinodontiformes
- Family: Rivulidae
- Genus: Simpsonichthys
- Species: S. perpendicularis

Binomial name
- Simpsonichthys perpendicularis W. J. E. M. Costa, Nielsen & de Luca 2001

Synonyms
- Ophthalmolebias perpendicularis (Costa, Nielsen & de Luca, 2001)

Species of killifish

Simpsonichthys perpendicularis is a species of killifish in the family Rivulidae. It is found in the Jequitinhonha River basin in Brazil.

== Description ==
Simpsonichthys perpendicularis reaches a length of 6.0 cm (2.4 in).
