= Paracatu =

Paracatu may refer to:

- Paracatu, Minas Gerais, a municipality in the state of Minas Gerais, Brazil
- Paracatu River, a river in the state of Minas Gerais, Brazil
