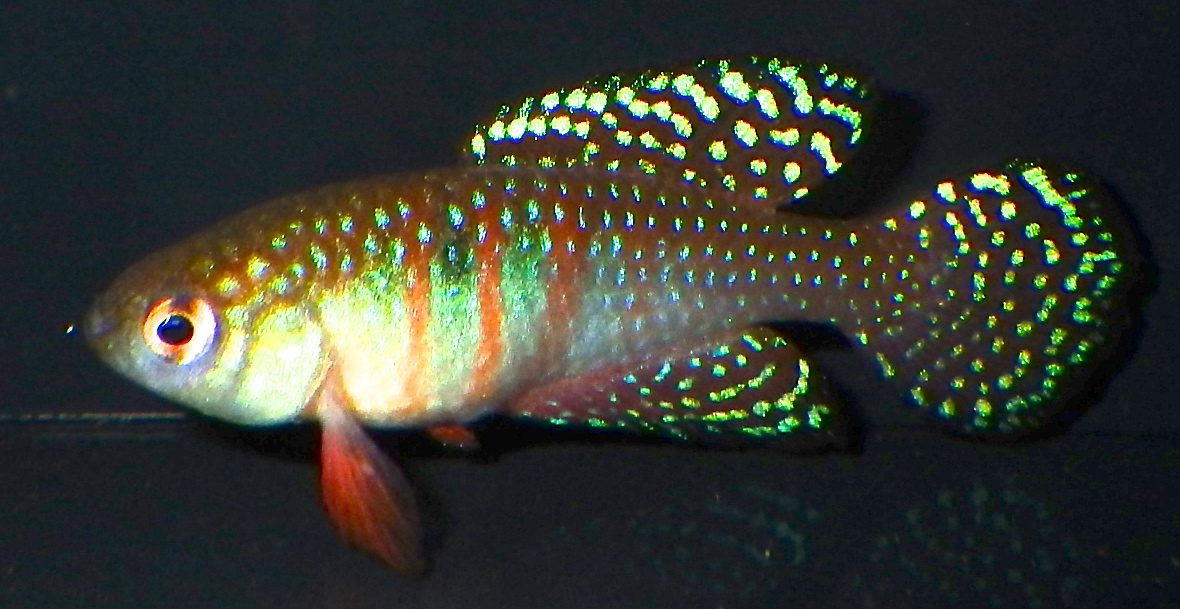

Scientific classification
- Kingdom: Animalia
- Phylum: Chordata
- Class: Actinopterygii
- Order: Cyprinodontiformes
- Family: Rivulidae
- Genus: Hypsolebias
- Species: H. magnificus

Binomial name
- Hypsolebias magnificus (W. J. E. M. Costa & G. C. Brasil, 1991)

Synonyms
- Cynolebias magnificus Costa & Brasil, 1991; Simpsonichthys magnificus (Costa & Brasil 1991)

= Hypsolebias magnificus =

Species of fish

Hypsolebias magnificus is a species of killifish in the family Rivulidae native the Middle São Francisco River basin in Brazil. It grows to 5 cm (2.0 in) TL.

It was formerly included in the genus Simpsonichthys but has been recently reclassified.

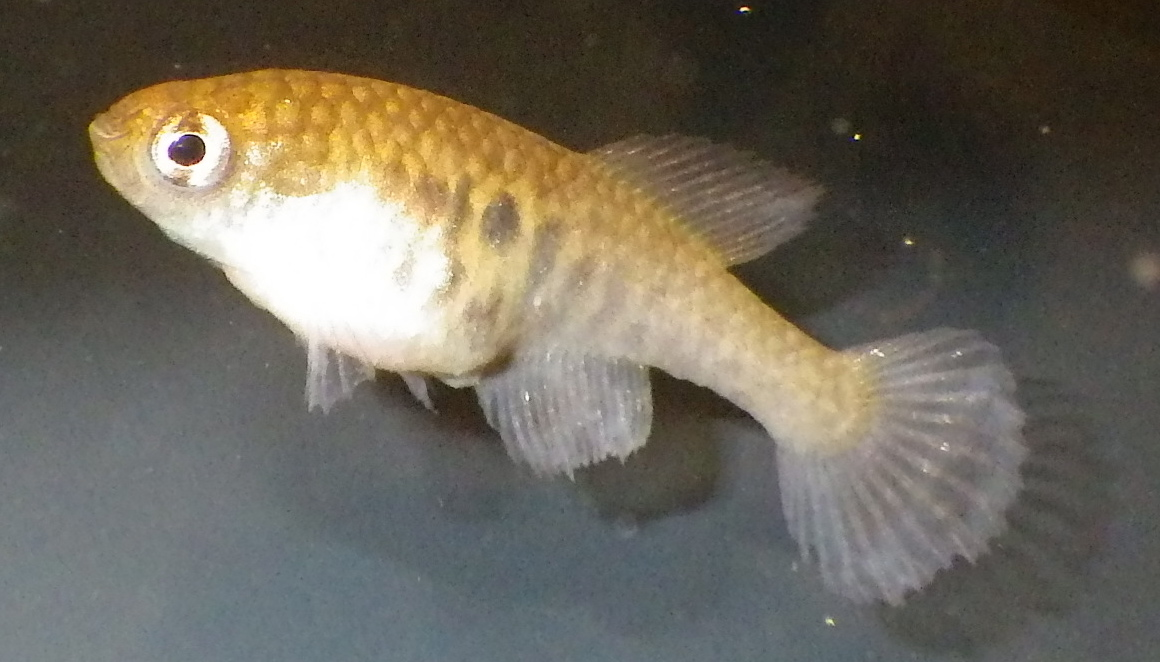
H. magnificus female
