= Simpsonichthys margaritatus =

Conservation status
- Data Deficient (IUCN 3.1)

Scientific classification
- Kingdom: Animalia
- Phylum: Chordata
- Class: Actinopterygii
- Order: Cyprinodontiformes
- Family: Rivulidae
- Genus: Simpsonichthys
- Species: S. margaritatus

Binomial name
- Simpsonichthys margaritatus W. J. E. M. Costa, 2012

Species of killifish

Simpsonichthys margaritatus is a species of killifish from the family Rivulidae. It is found in the Verde River floodplains, of the upper Paraná River basin in central Brazil.
