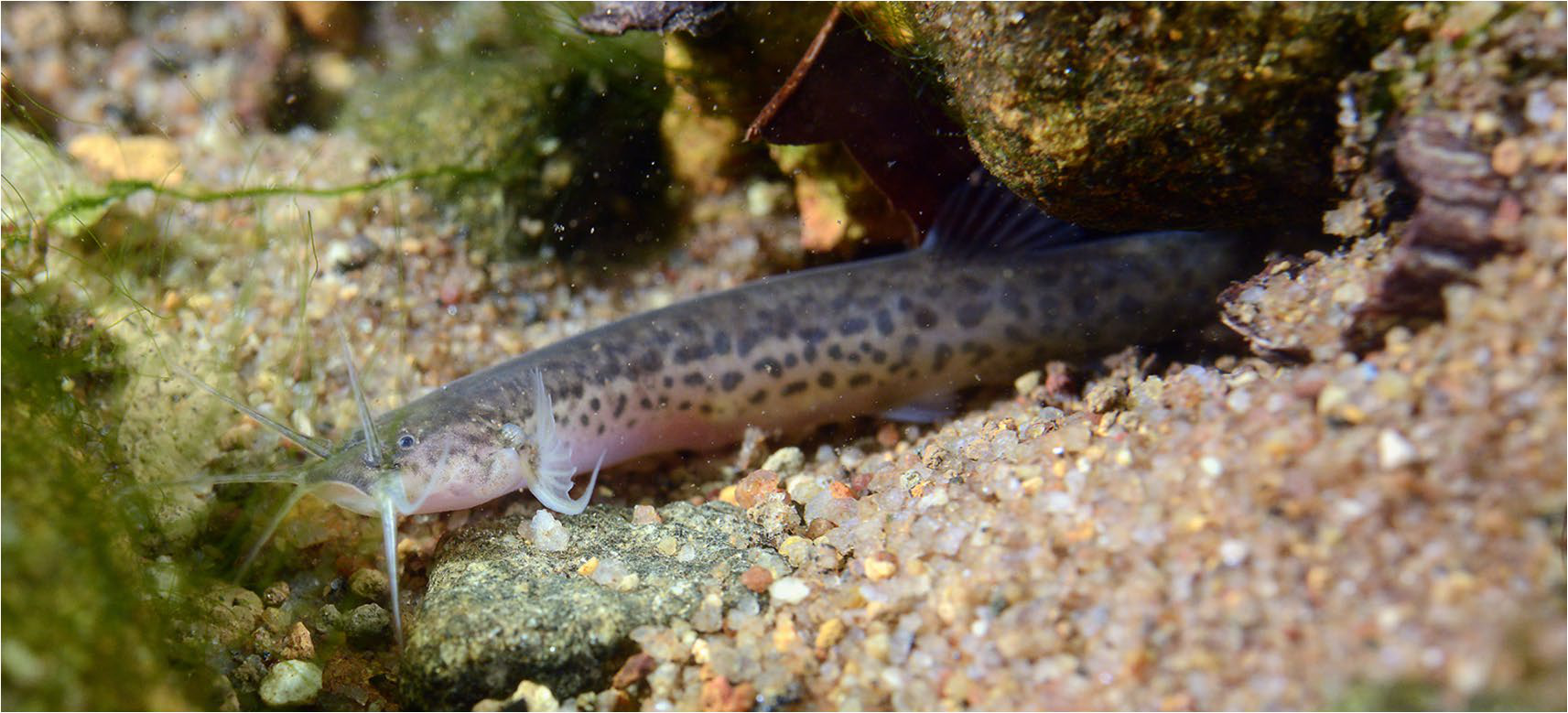
- Ituglanis nebulosus

Scientific classification
- Kingdom: Animalia
- Phylum: Chordata
- Class: Actinopterygii
- Order: Siluriformes
- Family: Trichomycteridae
- Subfamily: Trichomycterinae
- Genus: Ituglanis; Costa & Bockmann, 1993

Type species
- Pygidium proops parahybae Eigenmann, 1918

= Ituglanis =

Genus of fishes

Ituglanis is a genus of small freshwater ray-finned fish belonging to the family Trichomycteridae, the pencil and parasitic catfishes. These catfishes are found in South America. Their greatest diversity seems to occur in the Amazon River basin. Most species inhabit leaf litter, with several species living in caves.

This genus was first erected for nine species previously classified in Trichomycterus. Ituglanis is believed to be a monophyletic group. There may be two monophyletic groups within this genus. Ituglanis is currently considered a member of the subfamily Trichomycterinae though its position as a member of any of the current subfamilies has been questioned. Instead, it has been suggested to be the sister group of a large clade composed of the Glanapteryginae, Sarcoglanidinae, Stegophilinae, Tridentinae and Vandelliinae.

== Species ==
There are currently over thirty recognized species in this genus:

- Ituglanis agreste S. Lima, C. P. Neves & Campos-Paiva, 2013
- Ituglanis amazonicus (Steindachner, 1882)
- Ituglanis amphipotamus Mendonça, Oyakawa & Wosiacki, 2018
- Ituglanis apteryx Datovo, 2014
- Ituglanis australis Datovo & de Pinna, 2014
- Ituglanis bambui Bichuette & Trajano, 2004
- Ituglanis boitata Ferrer, Donin & L. R. Malabarba, 2015
- Ituglanis boticario Rizzato & Bichuette, 2015
- Ituglanis cahyensis Sarmento-Soares, Martins-Pinheiro, Aranda & Chamon, 2006
- Ituglanis compactus Castro & Wosiacki, 2017
- Ituglanis crispim Donin, de Pinna, Severi & Ramos, 2023
- Ituglanis eichhorniarum (A. Miranda-Ribeiro, 1912)
- Ituglanis epikarsticus Bichuette & Trajano, 2004
- Ituglanis goya Datovo, Aquino & Langeani, 2016
- Ituglanis gracilior (C. H. Eigenmann, 1912)
- Ituglanis guayaberensis (Dahl, 1960)
- Ituglanis herberti (P. Miranda Ribeiro, 1940)
- Ituglanis ina Wosiacki, Dutra & Mendonça, 2012
- Ituglanis inusitatus Ferrer & Donin, 2017
- Ituglanis jussariensis Vilardo, Katz & W. Costa, 2024
- Ituglanis laticeps (Kner, 1863)
- Ituglanis macunaima Datovo & Landim, 2005
- Ituglanis mambai Bichuette & Trajano, 2008
- Ituglanis metae (C. H. Eigenmann, 1917)
- Ituglanis nebulosus de Pinna & Keith, 2003
- Ituglanis paraguassuensis Campos-Paiva & W. Costa, 2007
- Ituglanis parahybae (C. H. Eigenmann, 1918)
- Ituglanis parkoi (P. Miranda Ribeiro, 1944)
- Ituglanis passensis L. A. Fernández & Bichuette, 2002
- Ituglanis payaya (Sarmento-Soares, Zanata & Martins-Pinheiro, 2011)
- Ituglanis proops (A. Miranda-Ribeiro, 1908)
- Ituglanis ramiroi Bichuette & Trajano, 2004
