= Oreiadoglanis =

Scientific classification
- Kingdom: Animalia
- Phylum: Chordata
- Class: Actinopterygii
- Order: Siluriformes
- Family: Trichomycteridae
- Subfamily: Trichomycterinae
- Genus: Oreiadoglanis; W. Costa & Katz, 2025

Type species
- Trichomycterus chapadensis Katz & W. Costa, 2021

Genus of fishes

Oreiadoglanis is a genus of freshwater ray-finned fish belonging to the family Trichomycteridae, the pencil and parasitic catfishes. The fishes in this genus are endemic to Brazil where they are found in the central part of the country.

== Species ==
Oreiadoglanis contains the following species:

- Oreiadoglanis chapadensis (Katz & W. Costa, 2021)
- Oreiadoglanis jatobensis (W. Costa, 2021)
