= Xenurolebias =

Scientific classification
- Kingdom: Animalia
- Phylum: Chordata
- Class: Actinopterygii
- Order: Cyprinodontiformes
- Family: Rivulidae
- Genus: Xenurolebias; W. J. E. M. Costa, 2006

Type species
- Simpsonichthys myersi Carvalho, 1971

Genus of fishes

Xenurolebias is a genus of fish in the family Rivulidae. These annual killifish are endemic to temporary pools in the Atlantic forest near the coast in southeast Bahia and Espírito Santo, Brazil.

They are small fish, up to 6 cm (2.4 in) in total length. As typical of killifish, males are more colorful than females.

== Species ==
Xenurolebias was formerly regarded as a subgenus of Simpsonichthys.

There are currently 4 recognized species in Xenurolebias:

- Xenurolebias cricarensis W. J. E. M. Costa, 2014
- Xenurolebias izecksohni da Cruz, 1983
- Xenurolebias myersi A. L. de Carvalho, 1971
- Xenurolebias pataxo W. J. E. M. Costa, 2014
