= Simpsonichthys zonatus =

Conservation status
- Critically Endangered (IUCN 3.1)

Scientific classification
- Kingdom: Animalia
- Phylum: Chordata
- Class: Actinopterygii
- Order: Cyprinodontiformes
- Family: Rivulidae
- Genus: Simpsonichthys
- Species: S. zonatus

Binomial name
- Simpsonichthys zonatus (W. J. E. M. Costa & G. C. Brasil, 1990)

Synonyms
- Cynolebias zonatus Costa & Brasil, 1990

Species of killifish

Simpsonichthys zonatus is a species of killifish from the family Rivulidae. It is found in the São Francisco River basin in Brazil.

== Description ==
Simpsonichthys zonatus reaches a standard length of 5.0 cm (2.0 in).
