= Ophthalmolebias =

Conservation status
- Critically Endangered (IUCN 3.1)

Scientific classification
- Kingdom: Animalia
- Phylum: Chordata
- Class: Actinopterygii
- Order: Cyprinodontiformes
- Family: Rivulidae
- Genus: Ophthalmolebias; Costa, 2006
- Species: O. ilheusensis

Binomial name
- Ophthalmolebias ilheusensis (W. J. E. M. Costa & S. M. Q. Lima, 2010)

Synonyms
- Simpsonichthys ilheusensis Costa & Lima, 2010

Species of fish

Ophthalmolebias ilheusensis is a killifish from the family Rivulidae which is endemic to Brazil where it is only known from river floodplains near Ilhéus in Bahia. Fishbase has this as the only species in the genus Opthamolebias with the other five species which other authorities classify as being within that genus placed in Simpsonichthys. The genus Ophthalmolebias was initially considered a subgenus of Simpsonichthys, but has been elevated to full genus status.
