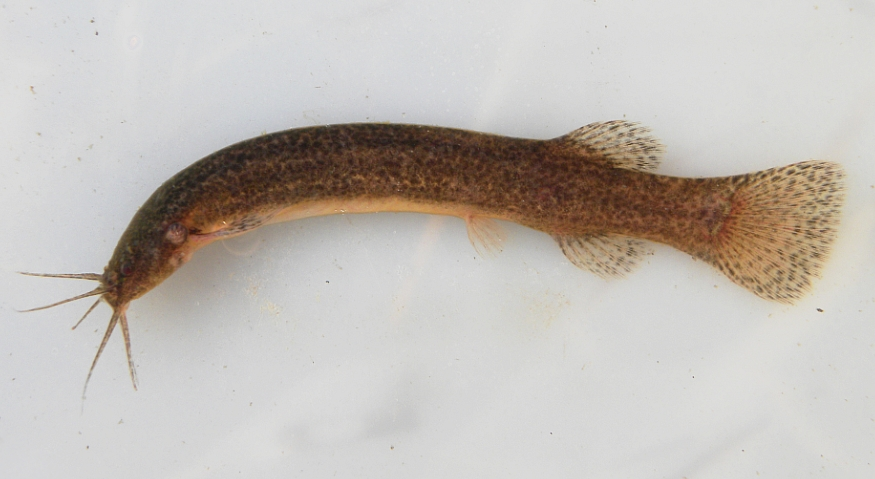

Scientific classification
- Kingdom: Animalia
- Phylum: Chordata
- Class: Actinopterygii
- Order: Siluriformes
- Family: Trichomycteridae
- Genus: Ituglanis
- Species: I. australis

Binomial name
- Ituglanis australis Datovo & de Pinna, 2014

= Ituglanis australis =

Species of pencil catfish

Ituglanis australis is a species of freshwater ray-finned fish belonging to the family Trichomycteridae, the pencil and parasitic catfishes. This catfish is found in Brazil and Uruguay.

== Description ==
The species is described as having three stripes on each flank, all dark brown. At the time in 2014, this was the farthest south the genus had ever been found. Whilst most similar to Ituglanis parahybae and Ituglanis cahyensis, it differs in several ways, such as the number of fin rays and radials.
