= Simpsonichthys rosaceus =

Conservation status
- Vulnerable (IUCN 3.1)

Scientific classification
- Kingdom: Animalia
- Phylum: Chordata
- Class: Actinopterygii
- Order: Cyprinodontiformes
- Family: Rivulidae
- Genus: Simpsonichthys
- Species: S. rosaceus

Binomial name
- Simpsonichthys rosaceus W. J. E. M. Costa, Nielsen & de Luca 2001

Synonyms
- Ophthalmolebias rosaceus (Costa, Nielsen & de Luca, 2001)

Species of killifish

Simpsonichthys rosaceus is a species of killifish from the family Rivulidae. It is found in the Pardo River basin in Brazil.

== Description ==
Simpsonichthys rosaceus reaches a standard length of 5.0 cm (2.0 in).
