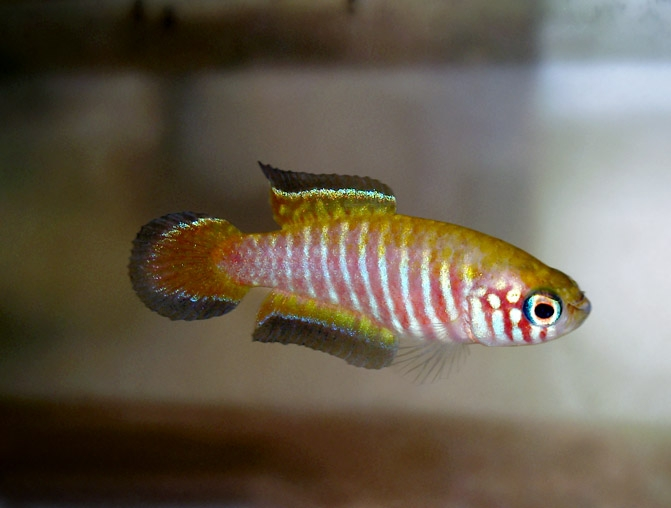

Conservation status
- Endangered (IUCN 3.1)

Scientific classification
- Kingdom: Animalia
- Phylum: Chordata
- Class: Actinopterygii
- Order: Cyprinodontiformes
- Family: Rivulidae
- Genus: Simpsonichthys
- Species: S. parallelus

Binomial name
- Simpsonichthys parallelus W. J. E. M. Costa, 2000

= Simpsonichthys parallelus =

Species of killifish

Simpsonichthys parallelus is a species of killifish in the family Rivulidae. It is found in the Paraná River basin of Brazil.

== Description ==
Simpsonichthys parallelus reaches a standard length of 2.3 cm (0.91 in).
