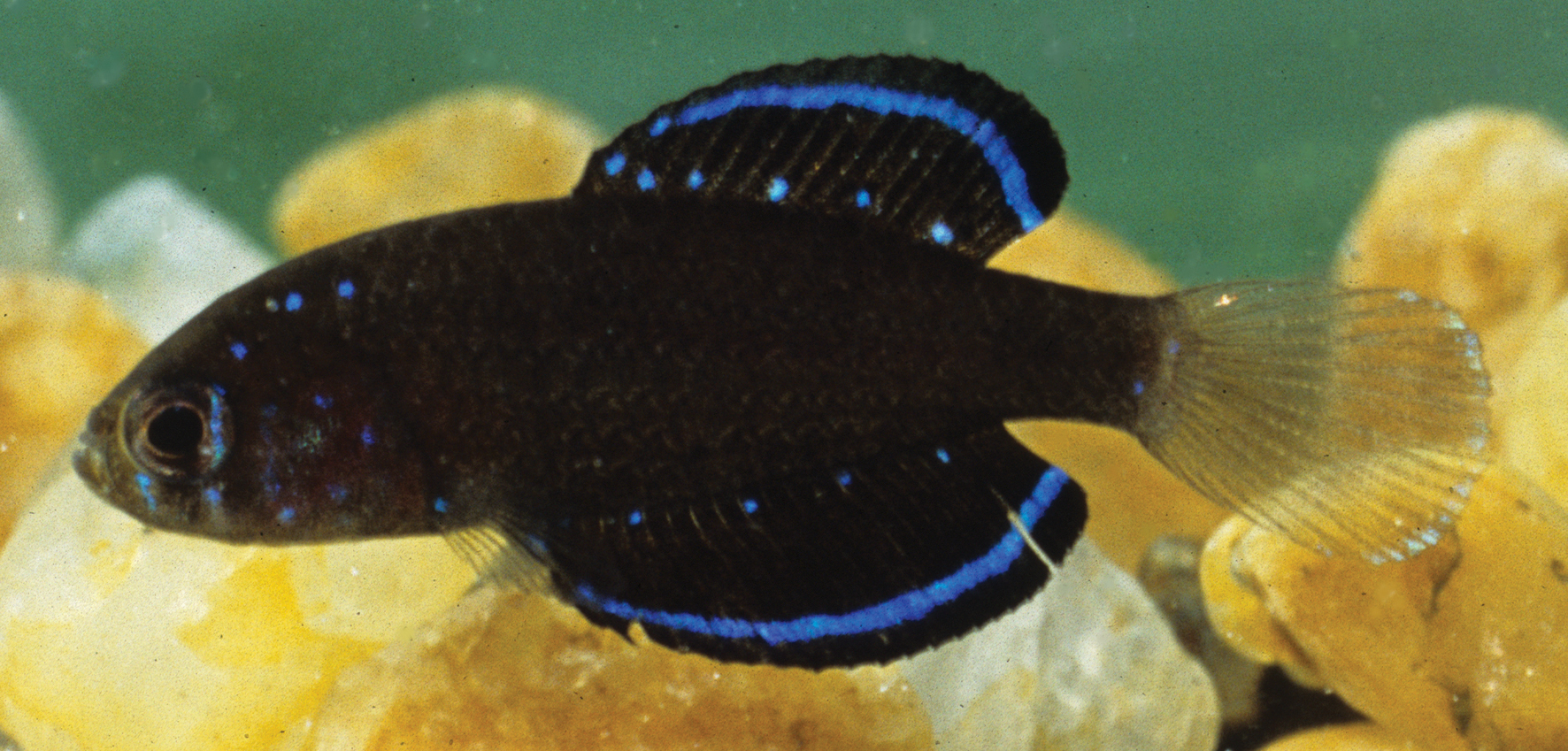

Scientific classification
- Kingdom: Animalia
- Phylum: Chordata
- Class: Actinopterygii
- Order: Cyprinodontiformes
- Family: Rivulidae
- Genus: Spectrolebias; W. J. E. M. Costa & D. T. B. Nielsen, 1997

Type species
- Spectrolebias semiocellatus Costa & Nielsen, 1997

= Spectrolebias =

Genus of fishes

Spectrolebias is a genus of killifish in the family Rivulidae. These annual killifish are endemic to seasonal waters (like pools) in the Paraguay, Tocantins–Araguaia, Xingu and Mamoré–Grande basins in Bolivia, Brazil and Paraguay. Each species generally has a small distribution and some are seriously threatened by habitat loss; the entire known range of S. reticulatus is in the area flooded by the Belo Monte Dam.

They are small fish, up to 6 cm (2.4 in) in total length. As typical of killifish, males are more colorful than females.

== Species ==
Spectrolebias was formerly regarded as a subgenus of Simpsonichthys. Although this split is generally accepted, a genetic study indicates that Spectrolebias is not monophyletic.

There are currently 9 recognized species in Spectrolebias:

- Spectrolebias bellidoi D. T. B. Nielsen & Pillet, 2015
- Spectrolebias brousseaui D. T. B. Nielsen, 2013
- Spectrolebias chacoensis (L. H. Amato, 1986)
- Spectrolebias costai (Lazara, 1991)
- Spectrolebias filamentosus (W. J. E. M. Costa, Barrera & Sarmiento, 1997)
- Spectrolebias inaequipinnatus (W. J. E. M. Costa & G. C. Brasil, 2008)
- Spectrolebias pilleti D. T. B. Nielsen & Brousseau, 2013
- Spectrolebias reticulatus (W. J. E. M. Costa & D. T. B. Nielsen, 2003)
- Spectrolebias semiocellatus W. J. E. M. Costa & D. T. B. Nielsen, 1997
