= Simpsonichthys similis =

Conservation status
- Vulnerable (IUCN 3.1)

Scientific classification
- Kingdom: Animalia
- Phylum: Chordata
- Class: Actinopterygii
- Order: Cyprinodontiformes
- Family: Rivulidae
- Genus: Simpsonichthys
- Species: S. similis

Binomial name
- Simpsonichthys similis W. J. E. M. Costa & Hellner, 1999

Synonyms
- Hypsolebias similis (Costa & Hellner, 1999)

Species of killifish

Simpsonichthys similis is a species of killifish from the family Rivulidae. It is found in the São Francisco River basin of Brazil.

== Description ==
Simpsonichthys similis reaches a standard length of 6.0 cm (2.4 in).
