= Simpsonichthys multiradiatus =

Conservation status
- Endangered (IUCN 3.1)

Scientific classification
- Kingdom: Animalia
- Phylum: Chordata
- Class: Actinopterygii
- Order: Cyprinodontiformes
- Family: Rivulidae
- Genus: Simpsonichthys
- Species: S. multiradiatus

Binomial name
- Simpsonichthys multiradiatus (W. J. E. M. Costa & G. C. Brasil, 1994)

Synonyms
- Cynolebias multiradiatus Costa & Brasil, 1994; Hypsolebias multiradiatus (Costa & Brasil, 1994)

Species of killifish

Simpsonichthys multiradiatus is a species of killifish in the family Rivulidae. It is found in the middle Tocantins River basin of Brazil. It is endemic to the middle Tocantins River basin in central Brazil, specifically occurring in the drainage of the Rio Paranã. Its habitat consists of temporary pools formed during the rainy season in the Cerrado biome.

== Description ==
Simpsonichthys multiradiatus reaches a standard length of 4.6 cm (1.8 in).
