= Simpsonichthys cholopteryx =

Conservation status
- Endangered (IUCN 3.1)

Scientific classification
- Kingdom: Animalia
- Phylum: Chordata
- Class: Actinopterygii
- Order: Cyprinodontiformes
- Family: Rivulidae
- Genus: Simpsonichthys
- Species: S. cholopteryx

Binomial name
- Simpsonichthys cholopteryx W. J. E. M. Costa, C. L. R. Moreira & F. C. T. Lima, 2003

Species of killifish

Simpsonichthys cholopteryx is a species of killifish in the family Rivulidae. It is found in Brazil.
