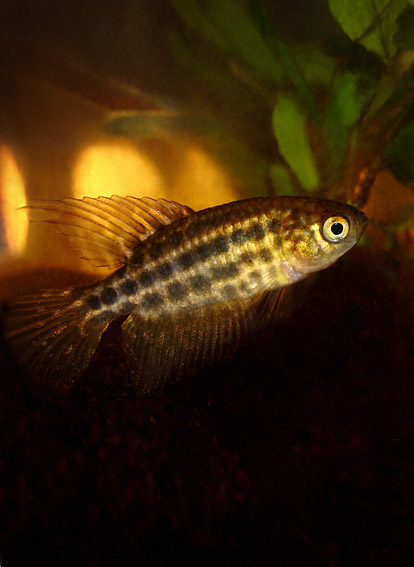

Conservation status
- Critically Endangered (IUCN 3.1)

Scientific classification
- Kingdom: Animalia
- Phylum: Chordata
- Class: Actinopterygii
- Order: Cyprinodontiformes
- Family: Rivulidae
- Genus: Simpsonichthys
- Species: S. constanciae

Binomial name
- Simpsonichthys constanciae (Myers, 1942)

Synonyms
- Cynolebias constanciae Myers, 1942; Ophthalmolebias constanciae (Myers 1942)

= Simpsonichthys constanciae =

Species of fish

Simpsonichthys constanciae is a species of killifish from the family Rivulidae that is endemic to Brazil. It is restricted to temporary freshwater habitats (like ponds) in the São João basin in Rio de Janeiro, while all other species in the genus are from Bahia. It is a small killifish that is up to 6 cm (2.4 in) in total length.

== Etymology ==
The specific name of this fish honours Constance White, an American watercolour painter, who collected type of this fish with her husband, Lieutenant colonel Thomas D. White, and created colour sketches for George S. Myers.
