= Simpsonichthys stellatus =

Conservation status
- Endangered (IUCN 3.1)

Scientific classification
- Kingdom: Animalia
- Phylum: Chordata
- Class: Actinopterygii
- Order: Cyprinodontiformes
- Family: Rivulidae
- Genus: Simpsonichthys
- Species: S. stellatus

Binomial name
- Simpsonichthys stellatus (W. J. E. M. Costa & G. C. Brasil, 1994)

Synonyms
- Cynolebias stellatus Costa & Brasil, 1994; Hypsolebias stellatus (Costa & Brasil, 1994)

Species of killifish

Simpsonichthys stellatus is a species of killifish from the family Rivulidae. It is found in the middle São Francisco River basin in Brazil.

== Description ==
Simpsonichthys stellatus reaches a standard length of 6.0 cm (2.4 in).
