= Simpsonichthys alternatus =

Conservation status
- Vulnerable (IUCN 3.1)

Scientific classification
- Kingdom: Animalia
- Phylum: Chordata
- Class: Actinopterygii
- Order: Cyprinodontiformes
- Family: Rivulidae
- Genus: Simpsonichthys
- Species: S. alternatus

Binomial name
- Simpsonichthys alternatus (W. J. E. M. Costa & G. C. Brasil, 1994)

Synonyms
- Cynolebias alternatus Costa & Brasil, 1994; Hypsolebias alternatus (Costa & Brasil, 1994)

Species of killifish

Simpsonichthys alternatus is a species of killifish in the family Rivulidae. It is found in the São Francisco River basin, Brazil.

== Description ==
Simpsonichthys alternatus reaches a standard length of 3.9 cm (1.5 in).
