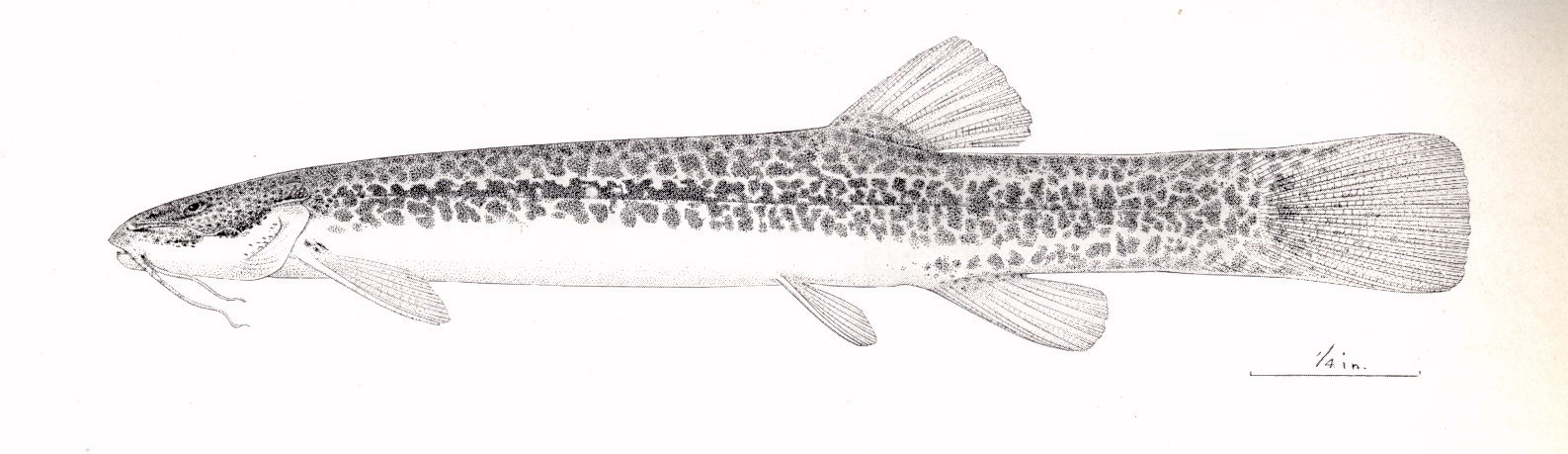
- 1911 illustration of C. davisi, type species

Scientific classification
- Kingdom: Animalia
- Phylum: Chordata
- Class: Actinopterygii
- Order: Siluriformes
- Family: Trichomycteridae
- Subfamily: Trichomycterinae
- Genus: Cambeva; Katz, M. A. Barbosa, Mattos & W. Costa, 2018

Type species
- Pygidium davisi Haseman, 1911

Species
- 65, see text.

= Cambeva =

Genus of fishes

Cambeva is a genus of freshwater ray-finned fish belonging to the family Trichomycteridae, the pencil and parasitic catfishes. These fishes are found in South America.

== Taxonomy ==
Cambeva was first proposed as a genus in 2018 by the Brazilian ichthyologists Axel Makay Katz, Maria Anaïs Barbosa, José Leonardo de Oliveira Mattos and Wilson José Eduardo Moreira da Costa with Pygidium davisi named as its type species. This genus is classified in the subfamily Trichomycterinae, the pencil catfishes, of the family Trichomycteridae, which contains teh pencil and parasitic catfishes. This family is included in the suborder Loricaroidei in the catfish order Siluriformes.

== Etymology ==
Cambeva is the common name for these catfishes in southeastern Brazil. It is derived from Tupi, a’kãg, meaning "head", combined with pwea, which means "flat", an allusion to the dorsally flattened heads of these fishes.

== Species ==
Cambeva contains the following valid species:

- Cambeva alphabelardense W. Costa, Feltrin & Katz, 2022
- Cambeva atrobrunnea W. Costa, Feltrin & Katz, 2024
- Cambeva babilonica W. Costa, Azevedo-Santos & Katz, 2025
- Cambeva balios (Ferrer & Malabarba, 2013)
- Cambeva barbosae W. Costa, Feltrin & Katz, 2021
- Cambeva betabelardense W. Costa, Feltrin & Katz, 2022
- Cambeva biseriata W. Costa, Feltrin, Mattos, Dalcin, Abilhoa & Katz, 2023
- Cambeva botuvera W. Costa, Feltrin & Katz, 2021
- Cambeva brachykechenos (Ferrer & Malabarba, 2013)
- Cambeva capetinga W. Costa, Azevedo-Santos, Uzeda & Katz, 2025
- Cambeva capitoliensis W. Costa, Azevedo-Santos, Uzeda, Vilardo & Katz, 2025
- Cambeva castroi (de Pinna, 1992)
- Cambeva cauim dos Reis, Ferrer & da Graça, 2021
- Cambeva chrysornata W. Costa, Feltrin, Mattos, Dalcin, Abilhoa & Katz, 2023
- Cambeva concolor (W. Costa, 1992)
- Cambeva crassicaudata (Wosiacki & de Pinna, 2008)
- Cambeva cubataonis (Carlos Roberto S. F. Bizerril, 1994)
- Cambeva damnata Costa, Azevedo-Santos, Ottoni, Vilardo & Katz, 2024
- Cambeva davisi (Haseman, 1911)
- Cambeva diabola (Bockmann, Casatti & de Pinna, 2004)
- Cambeva diatropoporos (Ferrer & Malabarba, 2013)
- Cambeva difficilis Costa, Feltrin & Katz, 2024
- Cambeva diffusa Costa, Feltrin & Katz, 2021
- Cambeva duplimaculata Costa, Feltrin & Katz, 2021
- Cambeva flavopicta Costa, Feltrin & Katz, 2020
- Cambeva galactica Costa, Feltrin & Katz, 2024
- Cambeva gamabelardense Costa, Feltrin & Katz, 2022
- Cambeva grisea Costa, Feltrin & Katz, 2021
- Cambeva guaraquessaba (Wosiacki, 2005)
- Cambeva guaratuba Costa, Feltrin, Mattos, Dalcin, Abilhoa & Katz, 2023
- Cambeva guareiensis Katz & Costa, 2020
- Cambeva horacioi dos Reis, Frota, Fabrin & da Graça, 2019
- Cambeva igobi (Wosiacki & de Pinna, 2008)
- Cambeva iheringi (C. H. Eigenmann, 1917)
- Cambeva imaruhy Costa, Feltrin & Katz, 2021
- Cambeva longipalata Costa, Feltrin & Katz, 2021
- Cambeva luteoreticulata Costa, Feltrin & Katz, 2024
- Cambeva mboycy (Wosiacki & Garavello, 2004)
- Cambeva melanoptera Costa, Abilhoa, Dalcin & Katz, 2022
- Cambeva naipi (Wosiacki & Garavello, 2004)
- Cambeva notabilis Costa, Feltrin & Katz, 2021
- Cambeva occidentalis Costa, Azevedo-Santos & Katz, 2025
- Cambeva orbitofrontalis Costa, Feltrin & Katz, 2021
- Cambeva panthera Costa, Feltrin & Katz, 2021
- Cambeva paolence (C. H. Eigenmann, 1917)
- Cambeva papillifera (Wosiacki & Garavello, 2004)
- Cambeva pascuali (Ochoa, Silva, Costa e Silva, Oliveira & Datovo, 2017)
- Cambeva pericoh Costa, Feltrin & Katz, 2021
- Cambeva perkos (Datovo, Carvalho & Ferrer, 2012)
- Cambeva perobana Martins, dos Reis, Stabile & da Graça, 2024
- Cambeva piraquara dos Reis, Wosiacki, Ferrer, Donin & da Graça, 2023
- Cambeva plumbea (Wosiacki & Garavello, 2004)
- Cambeva podostemophila Costa, Feltrin & Katz, 2023
- Cambeva poikilos (Ferrer & Malabarba, 2013)
- Cambeva rotundipinna Costa, Feltrin & Katz, 2024
- Cambeva stawiarski (P. Miranda Ribeiro, 1968)
- Cambeva taroba (Wosiacki & Garavello, 2004)
- Cambeva tourensis Costa, Feltrin & Katz, 2023
- Cambeva tropeiro (Ferrer & Malabarba, 2011)
- Cambeva tupinamba (Wosiacki & Oyakawa, 2005)
- Cambeva urubici Costa, Feltrin & Katz, 2021
- Cambeva variegata (Costa, 1992)
- Cambeva ventropapillata Costa, Feltrin, Mattos, Dalcin, Abilhoa & Katz, 2023
- Cambeva ytororo (Terán, Ferrer, Benitez, Alonso, Aguilera & Mirande, 2017)
- Cambeva zonata (C. H. Eigenmann, 1918)
