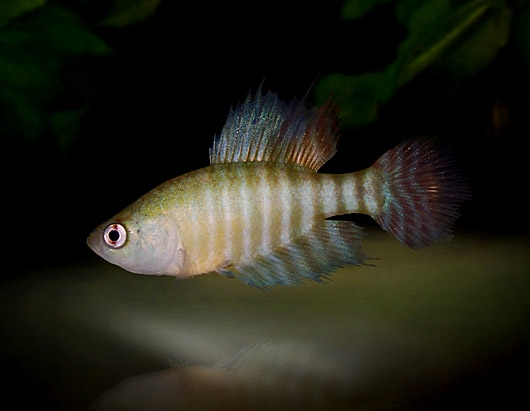
- Hypsolebias brunoi

Scientific classification
- Kingdom: Animalia
- Phylum: Chordata
- Class: Actinopterygii
- Order: Cyprinodontiformes
- Family: Rivulidae
- Genus: Hypsolebias; W. J. E. M. Costa, 2006

Type species
- Cynolebias flavicaudatus W. J. E. M. Costa & G. C. Brasil 1990

= Hypsolebias =

Genus of fishes

Hypsolebias is a genus of small fish in the family Rivulidae that are endemic the Caatinga, Cerrado and nearby regions in Brazil. The greatest species richness is in the São Francisco River basin, but there are also species in the Tocantins, Jequitinhonha and Jaguaribe systems, as well as smaller river basins in northeastern Brazil. Like their relatives, Hypsolebias are annual killifish. The short-lived adults inhabit temporary waters like rain pools, laying their eggs in the bottom. As their habitat dries up the adults die, but the eggs survive and hatch when the water returns in the next season.

The males are more colorful than the females, and male colors/patterns are a primary way of separating the different species. They are small fish that reach up to 7 cm (2.8 in) in total length.

== Species ==
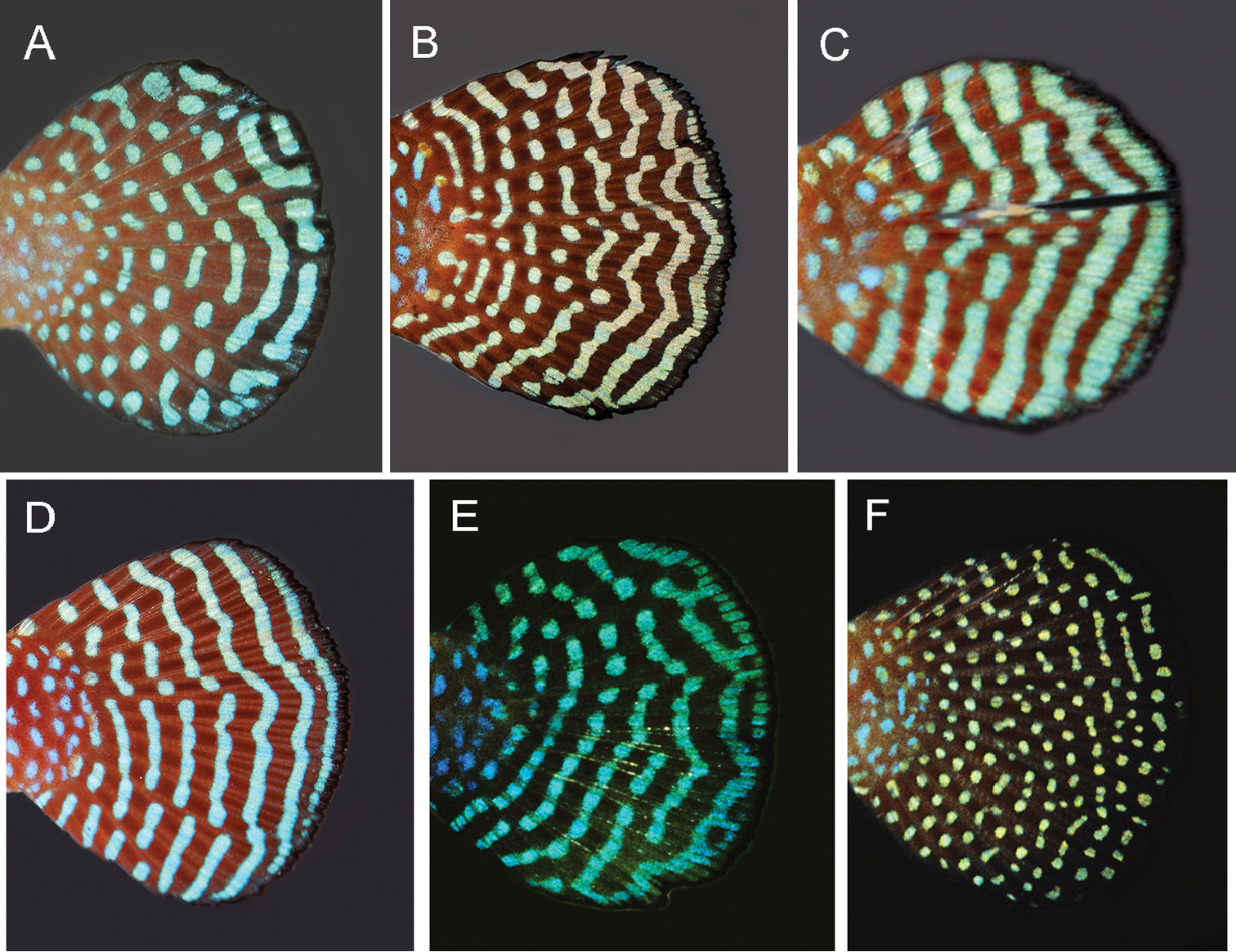
Tail fins of males of the H. magnificus complex

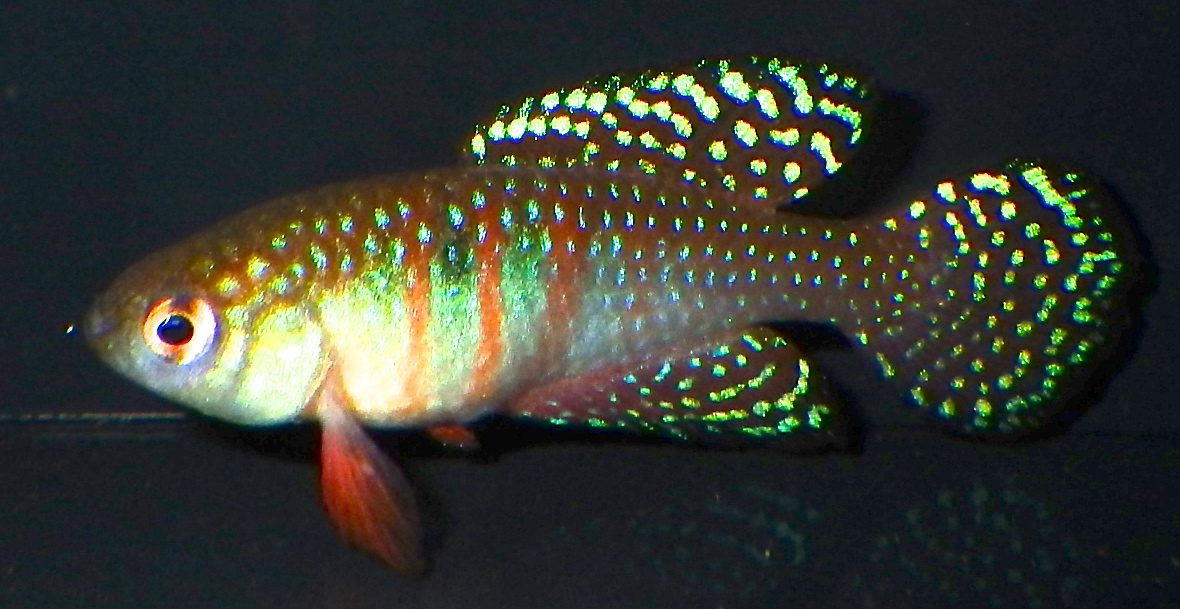
H. magnificus male

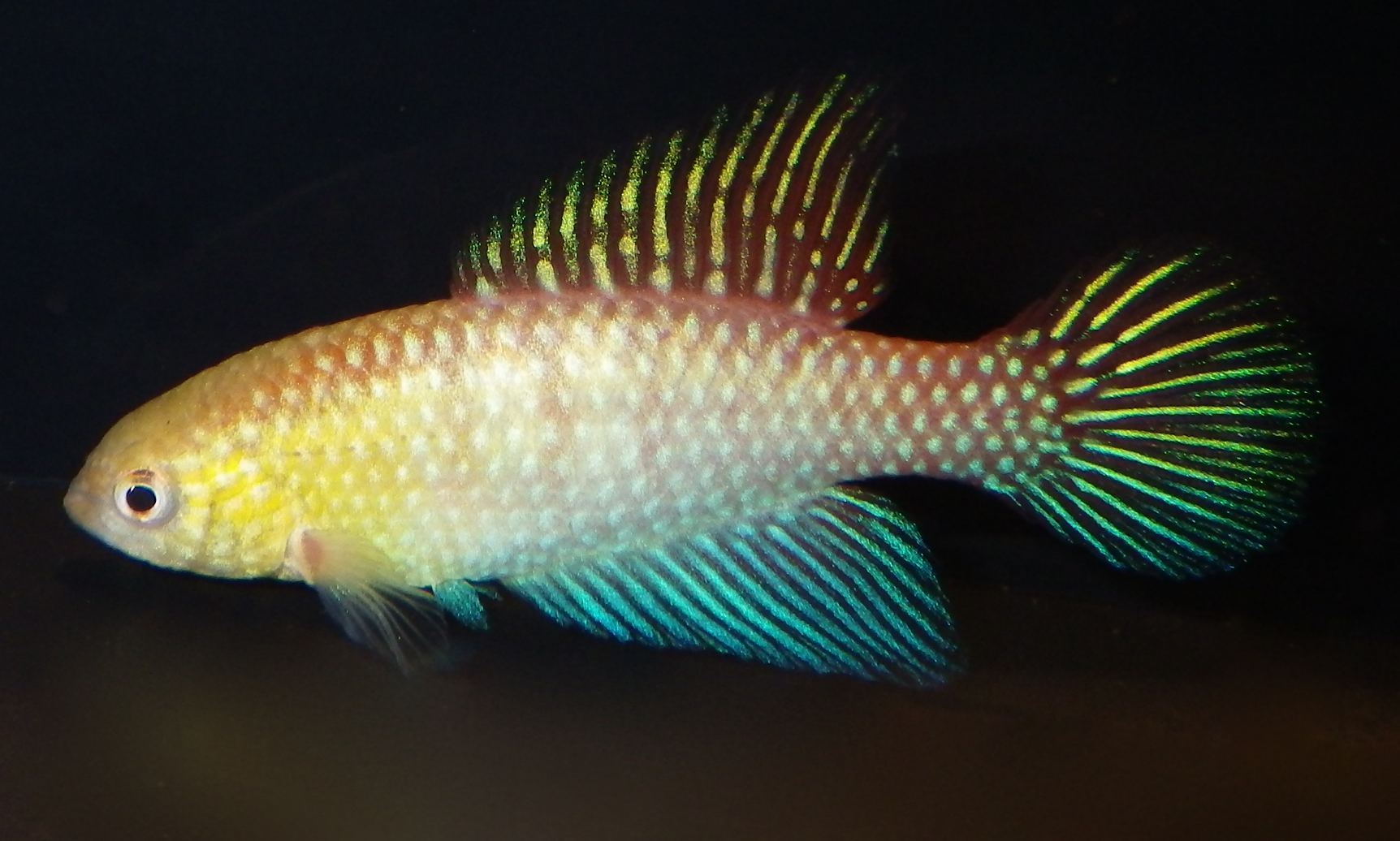
Male H. shibattai from Bom Jesus da Lapa

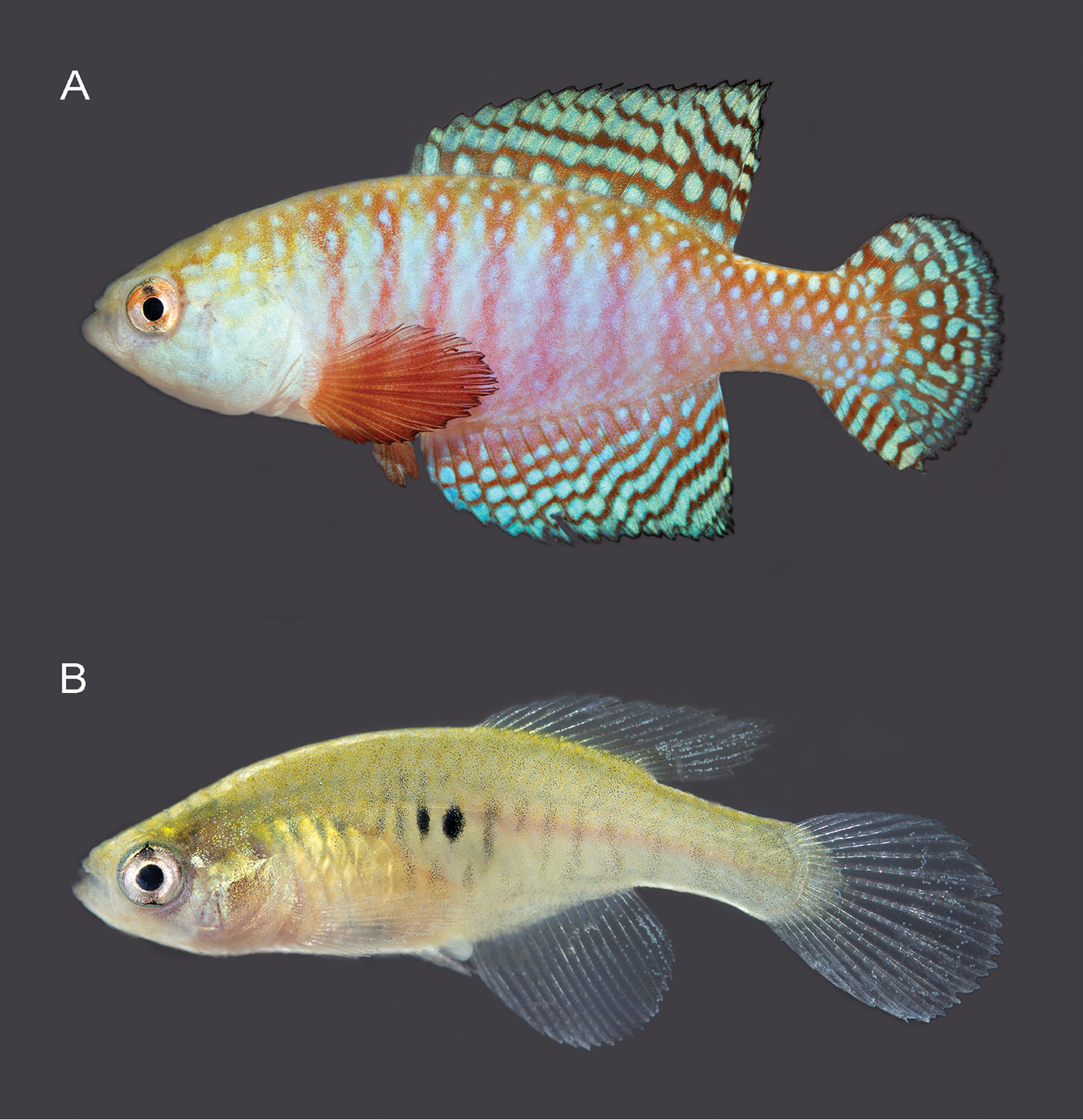
H. hamadryades holotypes A. Male. B. Female

Hypsolebias was formerly regarded as a subgenus of Simpsonichthys. Although this split is generally accepted, a genetic study indicates that Hypsolebias is not monophyletic.

There are 35 currently recognized species in Hypsolebias:

- Hypsolebias adornatus (W. J. E. M. Costa, 2000)
- Hypsolebias antenori (Tulipano, 1973)
- Hypsolebias auratus (W. J. E. M. Costa & D. T. B. Nielsen, 2000)
- Hypsolebias brunoi (W. J. E. M. Costa, 2003)
- Hypsolebias caeruleus W. J. E. M. Costa, 2013
- Hypsolebias carlettoi (W. J. E. M. Costa & D. T. B. Nielsen, 2004)
- Hypsolebias coamazonicus W. J. E. M. Costa, Amorim & Bragança, 2014
- Hypsolebias faouri Britzke, D. T. B. Nielsen & C. de Oliveira, 2016
- Hypsolebias flagellatus (W. J. E. M. Costa, 2003)
- Hypsolebias flammeus (W. J. E. M. Costa, 1989)
- Hypsolebias flavicaudatus (W. J. E. M. Costa & G. C. Brasil, 1990)
- Hypsolebias fulminantis (W. J. E. M. Costa & G. C. Brasil, 1993)
- Hypsolebias ghisolfii (W. J. E. M. Costa, Cyrino & D. T. B. Nielsen, 1996)
- Hypsolebias gilbertobrasili W. J. E. M. Costa, 2012
- Hypsolebias guanambi W. J. E. M. Costa & Amorim, 2011
- Hypsolebias harmonicus (W. J. E. M. Costa, 2010)
- Hypsolebias hellneri (Berkenkamp, 1993)
- Hypsolebias igneus (W. J. E. M. Costa, 2000)
- Hypsolebias janaubensis (W. J. E. M. Costa, 2006)
- Hypsolebias longignatus (W. J. E. M. Costa, 2008)
- Hypsolebias lopesi (D. T. B. Nielsen, Shibatta, Suzart & A. F. Martín, 2010)
- Hypsolebias macaubensis (W. J. E. M. Costa & Suzart, 2006)
- Hypsolebias magnificus (W. J. E. M. Costa & G. C. Brasil, 1991)
- Hypsolebias martinsi Britzke, D. T. B. Nielsen & C. de Oliveira, 2016
- Hypsolebias mediopapillatus (W. J. E. M. Costa, 2006)
- Hypsolebias nitens W. J. E. M. Costa, 2012
- Hypsolebias notatus (W. J. E. M. Costa, Lacerda & G. C. Brasil, 1990)
- Hypsolebias nudiorbitatus W. J. E. M. Costa, 2011
- Hypsolebias picturatus (W. J. E. M. Costa, 2000)
- Hypsolebias pterophyllus W. J. E. M. Costa, 2012
- Hypsolebias radiosus (W. J. E. M. Costa & G. C. Brasil, 2004)
- Hypsolebias radiseriatus W. J. E. M. Costa, 2012
- Hypsolebias sertanejo W. J. E. M. Costa, 2012
- Hypsolebias shibattai D. T. B. Nielsen, M. Martins, L. M. de Araújo & Suzart, 2014
- Hypsolebias tocantinensis D. T. B. Nielsen, J. C. da Cruz & A. C. Baptista, 2012
- Hypsolebias trifasciatus D. T. B. Nielsen, M. Martins, L. M. de Araújo, F. O. de Lira & A. F. Martín, 2014
