= Simpsonichthys nielseni =

Conservation status
- Endangered (IUCN 3.1)

Scientific classification
- Kingdom: Animalia
- Phylum: Chordata
- Class: Actinopterygii
- Order: Cyprinodontiformes
- Family: Rivulidae
- Genus: Simpsonichthys
- Species: S. nielseni

Binomial name
- Simpsonichthys nielseni W. J. E. M. Costa, 2005

Synonyms
- Hypsolebias nielseni (Costa, 2005)

Species of killifish

Simpsonichthys nielseni is a species of killifish in the family Rivulidae. It is found in the São Francisco River basin, Brazil.
