= Simpsonichthys delucai =

Conservation status
- Vulnerable (IUCN 3.1)

Scientific classification
- Kingdom: Animalia
- Phylum: Chordata
- Class: Actinopterygii
- Order: Cyprinodontiformes
- Family: Rivulidae
- Genus: Simpsonichthys
- Species: S. delucai

Binomial name
- Simpsonichthys delucai W. J. E. M. Costa, 2003

Synonyms
- Hypsolebias delucai (Costa, 2003)

Species of killifish

Simpsonichthys delucai is a species of killifish in the family Rivulidae. It is found in Brazil.

== Description ==
Simpsonichthys delucai reaches a standard length of 2.8 cm (1.1 in).

== Etymology ==
The fish is named in honor of Andre C. De Luca of the Federal University of Rio de Janeiro, who was the first collector of this species.
