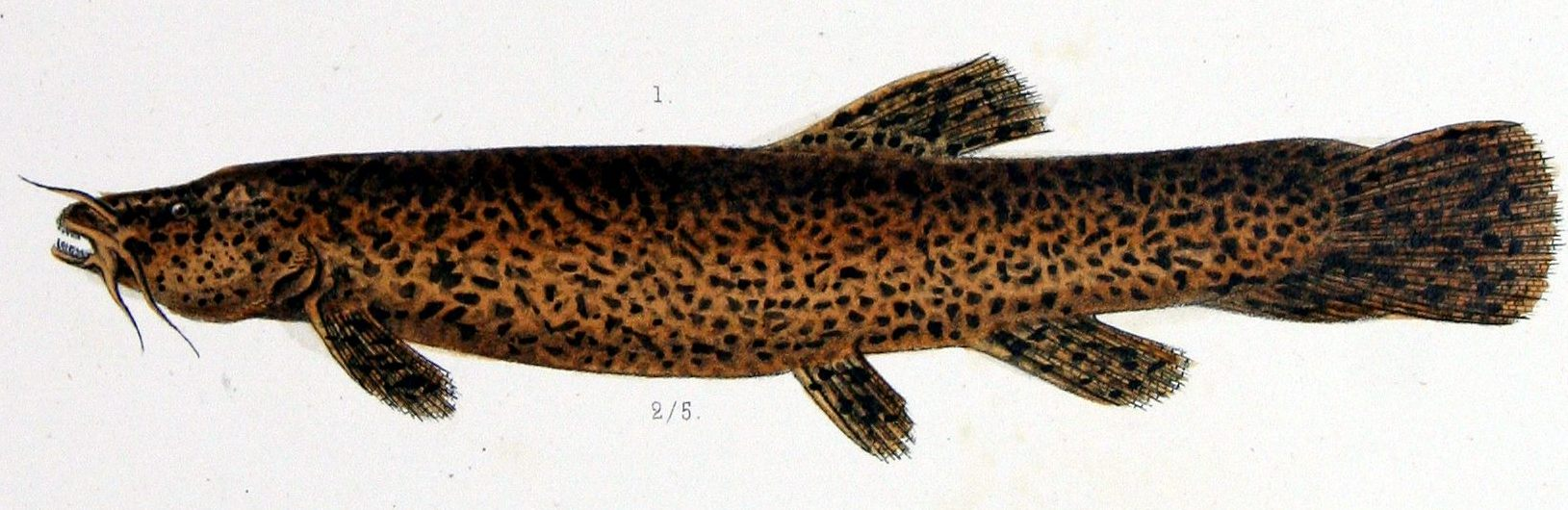
- Trichomycterus rivulatus

Scientific classification
- Kingdom: Animalia
- Phylum: Chordata
- Class: Actinopterygii
- Division: Teleostei
- Order: Siluriformes
- Family: Trichomycteridae
- Subfamily: Trichomycterinae; Bleeker, 1858

Type genus
- Trichomycterus Valenciennes, 1832

Genera
- see text

= Trichomycterinae =

Subfamily of fishes

Trichomycterinae, the pencil catfishes, is a subfamily of freshwater ray-finned fishes belonging to the family Trichomycteridae, the pencil and parasitic catfishes. Many of the genera are diagnosed by putatively apomorphic characters, whereas Trichomycterus is defined by the lack of those specializations and is likely not monophyletic. This subfamily has historically served as much of a wastebasket for trichomycterids that lack the specializations of the other subfamilies. Species of Trichomycterinae dwell in headwaters and small, cold clear water streams running over stony beds. Due to the patchy distribution of their habitats, trichomycterines generally have restricted geographic distributions, thus display a high level of endemism.

== Genera ==
Trichomycterinae contains the following valid genera:

- Bullockia Arratia, Chang G., Menu-Marque & Rojas M., 1978
- Cambeva Katz, M. A. Barbosa, Mattos & W. Costa, 2018
- Eremophilus Humboldt, 1805
- Hatcheria C. H. Eigenmann, 1909
- Ituglanis W. Costa & Bockmann, 1993
- Oreiadoglanis W. Costa & Katz, 2025
- Rhizosomichthys Miles, 1943
- Scleronema C. H. Eigenmann, 1917
- Silvinichthys Arratia, 1998
- Trichomycterus Valenciennes, 1832
