= Simpsonichthys suzarti =

Conservation status
- Vulnerable (IUCN 3.1)

Scientific classification
- Kingdom: Animalia
- Phylum: Chordata
- Class: Actinopterygii
- Order: Cyprinodontiformes
- Family: Rivulidae
- Genus: Simpsonichthys
- Species: S. suzarti

Binomial name
- Simpsonichthys suzarti W. J. E. M. Costa, 2003

Synonyms
- Ophthalmolebias suzarti (Costa, 2004)

Species of killifish

Simpsonichthys suzarti is a species of killifish in the family Rivulidae. It is found in the Rio Pardo floodplains of north-eastern Brazil.
