= Cambeva poikilos =

Conservation status
- Least Concern (IUCN 3.1)

Scientific classification
- Kingdom: Animalia
- Phylum: Chordata
- Class: Actinopterygii
- Order: Siluriformes
- Family: Trichomycteridae
- Genus: Cambeva
- Species: C. poikilos

Binomial name
- Cambeva poikilos (Ferrer & Malabarba, 2013)

Synonyms
- Trichomycterus poikilos Ferrer & Malabarba, 2013

Species of fish

Cambeva poikilos is a species of freshwater ray-finned fish belonging to the family Trichomycteridae, the pencil and parasitic catfishes. This catfish is endemic to Brazil, where it occurs in the Jacuí, Pardo and Taquari-das Antas river basins, tributaries of the Laguna dos Patos system, in the state of Rio Grande do Sul. This species reaches a maximum length of 9.25 centimetres (3.64 in) SL.

== Etymology ==
The specific name poikilos is derived from the Greek adjective ποικίλος, meaning variegated, varicolored, and refers to the intraspecific color pattern variation of the species.

== Habitat and ecology ==
The species' type locality (municipality of Júlio de Castilhos, arroio Passo dos Buracos, upper Jacuí river basin) is a rapid flow river with clear water, a rocky bottom and submerged vegetation, located at approximately 405 m a.s.l.; at this site, T. poikilos is associated with the submerged vegetation.

T. poikilos feeds on aquatic larvae of Diptera (Simuliidae) and Lepidoptera and nymphs of the Ephemeroptera and Plecoptera.
