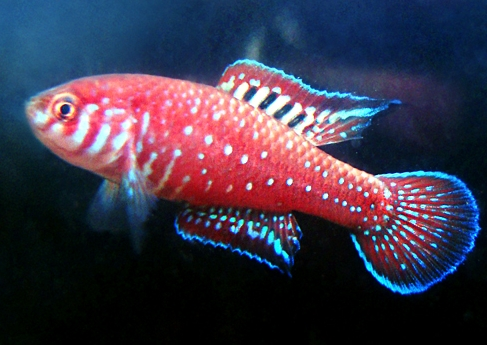
- Simpsonichthys boitonei

Conservation status
- Vulnerable (IUCN 2.3)

Scientific classification
- Kingdom: Animalia
- Phylum: Chordata
- Class: Actinopterygii
- Order: Cyprinodontiformes
- Family: Rivulidae
- Genus: Simpsonichthys
- Species: S. boitonei

Binomial name
- Simpsonichthys boitonei Carvalho, 1959

Synonyms
- Cynolebias boitonei (Carvalho, 1959)

= Simpsonichthys boitonei =

Species of fish

Simpsonichthys boitonei, the Brasília lyrefin, is a species of fish in the family Rivulidae. It is endemic to Brazil.
