= Silvinichthys =

Scientific classification
- Kingdom: Animalia
- Phylum: Chordata
- Class: Actinopterygii
- Division: Teleostei
- Order: Siluriformes
- Family: Trichomycteridae
- Subfamily: Trichomycterinae
- Genus: Silvinichthys; Arratia, 1998

Type species
- Trichomycterus mendozensis Arratia, Chang G., Menu-Marque & Rojas M., 1978

Genus of fishes

Silvinichthys is a genus of freshwater ray-finned fish belonging to the family Trichomycteridae, the pencil and parasitic catfishes. The catfishes in this genus are endemic to Argentina. Many species are Phreatobites.

== Species ==
There are currently 7 recognized species in this genus:

- Silvinichthys bortayro L. A. Fernández & de Pinna, 2005
- Silvinichthys gualcamayo L. A. Fernández, Sanabria & Quiroga, 2013
- Silvinichthys huachi L. A. Fernández, Sanabria, Quiroga & Vari, 2014
- Silvinichthys leoncitensis L. A. Fernández, Dominino, Brancolini & Baigún, 2011
- Silvinichthys mendozensis (Arratia, Chang G., Menu-Marque & Rojas M., 1978)
- Silvinichthys pachonensis L. A. Fernández & Liotta, 2016
- Silvinichthys pedernalensis L. A. Fernández, Sanabria & Quiroga, 2017
