= Cambeva stawiarski =

Conservation status
- Least Concern (IUCN 3.1)

Scientific classification
- Kingdom: Animalia
- Phylum: Chordata
- Class: Actinopterygii
- Order: Siluriformes
- Family: Trichomycteridae
- Genus: Cambeva
- Species: C. stawiarski

Binomial name
- Cambeva stawiarski (P. Miranda Ribeiro, 1968)

Synonyms
- Pygidium stawiarski P. Miranda Ribeiro, 1968; Trichomycterus stawiarski (P. Miranda Ribeiro, 1968)

Species of fish

Cambeva stawiarski is a species of freshwater ray-finned fish belonging to the family Trichomycteridae, the pencil and parasitic catfishes. This catfish is endemic to Brazil, where it occurs in the upper Iguaçu river basin. This species reaches a maximum length of 8.66 centimetres (3.41 in).
