= Notholebias minimus =

Scientific classification
- Domain: Eukaryota
- Kingdom: Animalia
- Phylum: Chordata
- Class: Actinopterygii
- Order: Cyprinodontiformes
- Family: Rivulidae
- Genus: Notholebias
- Species: N. minimus

Binomial name
- Notholebias minimus (Myers, 1942)

Synonyms
- Cynopoecilus foerschi Knaack, 1970; Cynolebias minimus Myers, 1942; Cynopoecilus minimus (Myers, 1942); Leptolebias minimus (Myers, 1942); Cynolebias ladigesi Foersch, 1958; Cynopoecilus ladigesi (Foersch, 1958)

Species of fish

Notholebias minimus, the barredtail pearlfish, least pearlfish or minute pearlfish, is a species of fish in the family Rivulidae. It is native to Brazil.
