= Cambeva balios =

Conservation status
- Least Concern (IUCN 3.1)

Scientific classification
- Kingdom: Animalia
- Phylum: Chordata
- Class: Actinopterygii
- Order: Siluriformes
- Family: Trichomycteridae
- Genus: Cambeva
- Species: C. balios

Binomial name
- Cambeva balios (Ferrer & Malabarba, 2013)

Synonyms
- Trichomycterus balios Ferrer & Malabarba, 2013

Species of fish

Cambeva balios is a species of freshwater ray-finned fish belonging to the family Trichomycteridae, the pencil and parasitic catfishes. This catfish is endemic to Brazil, where it occurs in the upper portion of the Das Antas and Caí river basins (Laguna dos Patos system), and the Mampituba river basin, in the state of Rio Grande do Sul. This species reaches a maximum length of 10.1 centimetres (4.0 in) SL.

== Etymology ==
The specific name balios is derived from the Greek adjective βαλιός, meaning spotted, dappled, and refers to the color pattern of the species formed by circular black blotches.

== Habitat and ecology ==
The localities where the type specimens were collected had clear water and rocky bottoms.

C. balios feeds on larvae of Diptera (Chironomidae, Simuliidae), Lepidoptera, and Trichoptera and nymphs of Ephemeroptera and Plecoptera.
