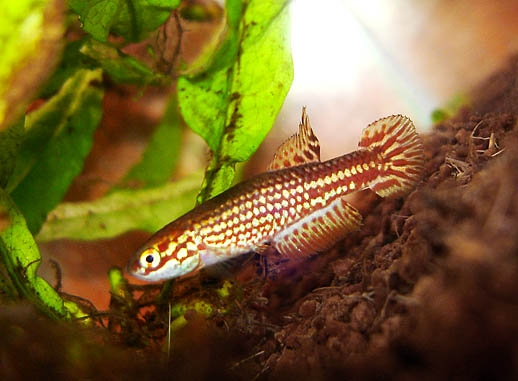
- Leptolebias aureoguttatus

Scientific classification
- Kingdom: Animalia
- Phylum: Chordata
- Class: Actinopterygii
- Order: Cyprinodontiformes
- Family: Rivulidae
- Genus: Leptolebias; G. S. Myers, 1952

Type species
- Cynopoecilus marmoratus Ladiges, 1934

= Leptolebias =

Genus of fishes

Leptolebias is a ray-finned fish genus of the killifish family Rivulidae. Like many of their relatives, they are rather ambiguously known as "pearlfish".

They are endemic to the coastal areas of Brazil, where they inhabit ephemeral pools in tropical forests like the Mata Atlântica (or what remains thereof) and restinga. Rare and little-known, the entire genus seems to be close to extinction. Specifically, Leptolebias species have been found in two regions to date: between Maricá and Vila de Cava in Rio de Janeiro state, and between Itanhaém in southern São Paulo state and the Paranaguá bay catchment area in Paraná state.

== Description ==
These small fishes measure only 2–3 cm (around one inch) in standard length. The females are colored uniformly brown, without darker markings, as are the females of some related killifishes. The males may have some dark pigmentation, but it does not extend into the distal dorsal fin, as it does in many related genera. Otherwise, they are mainly colored in bright reddish and yellow hues, with iridescent or similarly conspicuous spots on the sides; their opercular region bears red horizontal stripes that usually interconnect to form a web-like pattern. The caudal fin of Leptolebias species is elongated and longer than deep, and the members of this genus have a single anterior supraorbital neuromast.

== Systematics ==
A cladistic study revealed that the genus Leptolebias in the old circumscription was paraphyletic: some species often placed here are actually less closely related to the type species L. marmoratus; the marbled pearlfish; than the related genera Campellolebias and Cynopoecilus are. These species have subsequently been separated in Notholebias. There are proposals to move other species to Leptopanchax, Mucurilebias and Notholebias.

== Species ==
The currently recognized species in this genus are:

- Leptolebias aureoguttatus (da Cruz, 1974)
- Leptolebias citrinipinnis (W. J. E. M. Costa, Lacerda & Tanizaki, 1988)
- Leptolebias itanhaensis W. J. E. M. Costa, 2008
- Leptolebias marmoratus (Ladiges, 1934) (marbled pearlfish)
- Leptolebias opalescens (G. S. Myers, 1942) (opalescent pearlfish)
- Leptolebias splendens (G. S. Myers, 1942) (splendid pearlfish)
