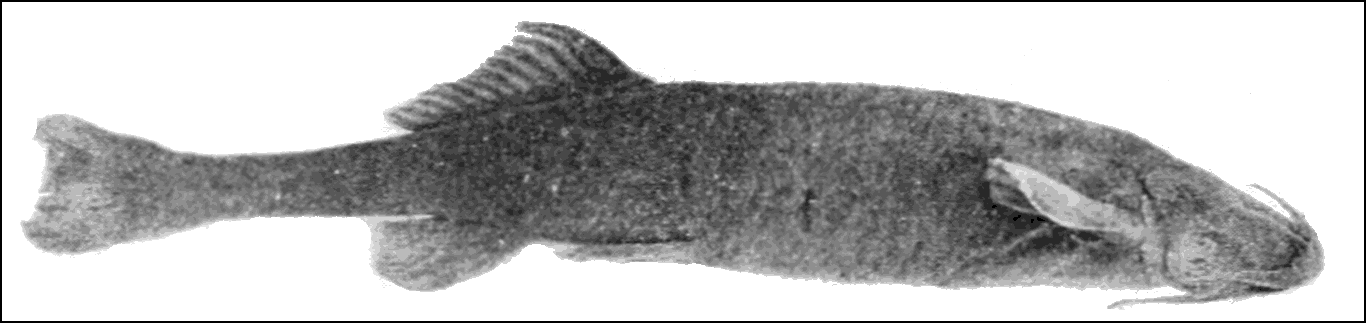

Conservation status
- Least Concern (IUCN 3.1)

Scientific classification
- Kingdom: Animalia
- Phylum: Chordata
- Class: Actinopterygii
- Order: Siluriformes
- Family: Trichomycteridae
- Subfamily: Trichomycterinae
- Genus: Hatcheria; C. H. Eigenmann, 1909
- Species: H. macraei

Binomial name
- Hatcheria macraei (Girard, 1855)

Synonyms
- Thrichomycterus macraei Girard, 1855; Pygidium burmeisteri Berg, 1895; Hatcheria patagoniensis C. H. Eigenmann, 1909; Hatecheria titcombi C. H. Eigenmann, 1917; Hatecheria pique MacDonagh, 1938; synonyms_ref =

= Hatcheria =

Species of fish

Hatcheria is a monospecific genus of freshwater ray-finned fish belonging to the family Trichomycteridae, the pencil and parasitic catfishes, the only species in the genus is Hatcheria macraei. This fish grows to about 20.8 centimetres (8.2 in) and originates from rivers east of the Andes in Argentina, between 29° and 45°30′S.
