= Cambeva brachykechenos =

Conservation status
- Least Concern (IUCN 3.1)

Scientific classification
- Kingdom: Animalia
- Phylum: Chordata
- Class: Actinopterygii
- Order: Siluriformes
- Family: Trichomycteridae
- Genus: Cambeva
- Species: C. brachykechenos

Binomial name
- Cambeva brachykechenos (Ferrer & Malabarba, 2013)

Synonyms
- Trichomycterus brachykechenos Ferrer & Malabarba, 2013

Species of fish

Cambeva brachykechenos is a species of freshwater ray-finned fish belonging to the family Trichomycteridae, the pencil and parasitic catfishes. This catfish is endemic to Brazil, where it occurs in the dos Sinos river, part of the Laguna dos Patos system, in the state of Rio Grande do Sul. This species reaches a maximum length of 7.1 centimetres (2.8 in) SL.

== Etymology ==
The specific name brachykechenos is derived from the Greek brachys (βραχύς), meaning short, and kechenos (κεχηνώς), meaning gaping, and refers to the short posterior cranial fontanelle of the species.

== Habitat and ecology ==
At the locality where most of the type specimens were collected, the dos Sinos river is narrow (5 to 9m) and shallow (depth less than 1m) with fast current and rapids, a distinct slope, clear waters, a substrate consisting mainly of large rocks, and conserved riparian vegetation.

C. brachykechenos feeds on larvae of the Chironomidae (Diptera) and pupa of the Diptera.
