= Simpsonichthys espinhacensis =

Scientific classification
- Kingdom: Animalia
- Phylum: Chordata
- Class: Actinopterygii
- Order: Cyprinodontiformes
- Family: Rivulidae
- Genus: Simpsonichthys
- Species: S. espinhacensis

Binomial name
- Simpsonichthys espinhacensis Nielsen, Pessali & Dutra, 2017

Species of fish

Simpsonichthys espinhacensis is a species of killifish from the family Rivulidae. It is found in the upper Jequitinhonha River basin in Minas Gerais, eastern Brazil. The specific name refers to the Espinhaço Mountains where the known range of this species lies.

== Description ==
Male Simpsonichthys espinhacensis can grow to a standard length of 46 mm (1.8 in) and females to 34 mm (1.3 in).

== Habitat ==
The species is known from wetlands at elevations of 775–800 m (2,543–2,625 ft) above sea level. These wetlands are flooded during the rainy season and reduced to small pools and intermittent channels during the dry season. Vegetation is characterized by herbaceous and grassy plants as well as Mauritia flexuosa palms.
