= Cambeva diatropoporos =

Conservation status
- Least Concern (IUCN 3.1)

Scientific classification
- Kingdom: Animalia
- Phylum: Chordata
- Class: Actinopterygii
- Order: Siluriformes
- Family: Trichomycteridae
- Genus: Cambeva
- Species: C. diatropoporos

Binomial name
- Cambeva diatropoporos (Ferrer & Malabarba, 2013)

Synonyms
- Trichomycterus diatropoporos Ferrer & Malabarba, 2013

Species of fish

Cambeva diatropoporos is a species of freshwater ray-finned fish belonging to the family Trichomycteridae, the pencil and parasitic catfishes. This catfish is endemic to Brazil, where it occurs in the da Prata and Turvo river basins, tributaries of the das Antas river, in the Laguna dos Patos system in the state of Rio Grande do Sul. This species reaches a maximum length of 6.8 centimetres (2.7 in) SL.

== Etymology ==
The specific name diatropoporos is derived from the Greek diatropos, meaning variable, and poros, meaning pore, and refers to the variation in the presence of pores i1 and i3 of the infraorbital sensory canal of the species.

== Habitat and ecology ==
At the species' type locality (Passo do Despraiado, municipality of Nova Prata), the da Prata river is rapid flowing, wide and shallow, with an average depth of 0.5 m, clear water, rocky bottom and large amounts of submerged vegetation.

T. diatropoporos feeds on larvae of Diptera (Chironomidae, Simuliidae) and nymphs of Ephemeroptera.
