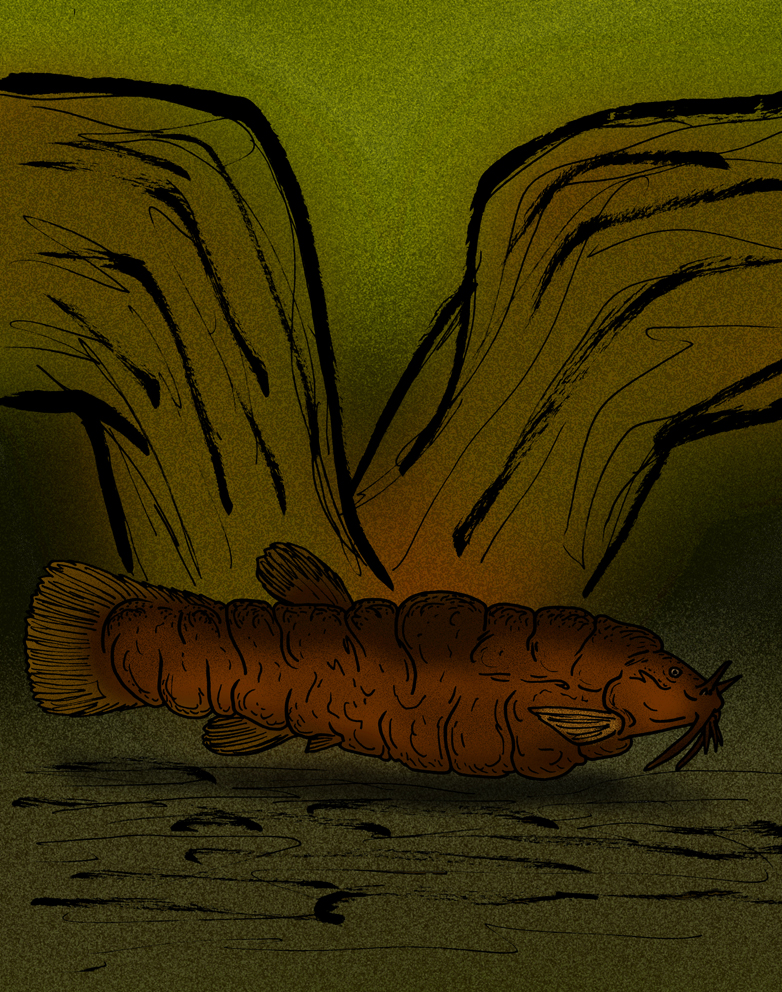
- Artist's image

Conservation status
- Critically endangered, possibly extinct (IUCN 3.1)

Scientific classification
- Kingdom: Animalia
- Phylum: Chordata
- Class: Actinopterygii
- Order: Siluriformes
- Family: Trichomycteridae
- Subfamily: Trichomycterinae
- Genus: Rhizosomichthys; Miles, 1943
- Species: R. totae

Binomial name
- Rhizosomichthys totae (Miles, 1942)

Synonyms
- Of Rhizosomichthys: Bathophilus Miles, 1942; Bathypygidium Whitley, 1947; Of Rhizosomichthys totae: Pygidium totae Miles, 1942; Trichomycterus totae (Miles, 1942)

= Rhizosomichthys =

Extinct species of fish

Rhizisomichthys is a monospecific genus of freshwater ray-finned fish belonging to the family Trichomycteridae, the pencil and parasitic catfishes. The only species in the genus is Rhizosomichthys totae, sometimes known in English as greasefish. This fish grew to about 13.8 centimetres (5.4 in) and was endemic to Colombia where it occurred in the Lake Tota basin. It is listed as a critically endangered (possibly extinct) species by the IUCN Red List. The species was last seen in 1957, and only 10 specimens were found. The disappearance is possibly linked to the release of 100,000 imported rainbow trout eggs into Lake Tota in 1936.

Specimens of R. totae are described as having eight rings of connective fat encircling the body and two large sections of fat tissue on the posterior part of the back and head. No other trichomycterid has comparable organization of adipose tissue.

This species is listed on Re:wild's top 25 most wanted lost species and currently a search using environmental DNA (eDNA) by the organization of SHOAL to hopefully find this species.
