= Cambeva guaraquessaba =

Conservation status
- Least Concern (IUCN 3.1)

Scientific classification
- Kingdom: Animalia
- Phylum: Chordata
- Class: Actinopterygii
- Order: Siluriformes
- Family: Trichomycteridae
- Genus: Cambeva
- Species: C. guaraquessaba

Binomial name
- Cambeva guaraquessaba (Wosiacki, 2005)

Synonyms
- Trichomycterus guaraquessaba Wosiacki, 2005

Species of fish

Cambeva guaraquessaba is a species of freshwater ray-finned fish belonging to the family Trichomycteridae, the pencil and parasitic catfishes. This catfish is presently only known from Rio Bracinho, a small isolated river in Paraná state, Brazil.

This is an elongate catfish up to 9.2 centimetres (3.6 in) standard length. It has no unique morphological features and can be distinguished from its congeners by a combination of characters including a uniformly grey colouring with only small dark spots on the flank, pelvic fin not covering the urogenital opening and square-ended caudal fin.
