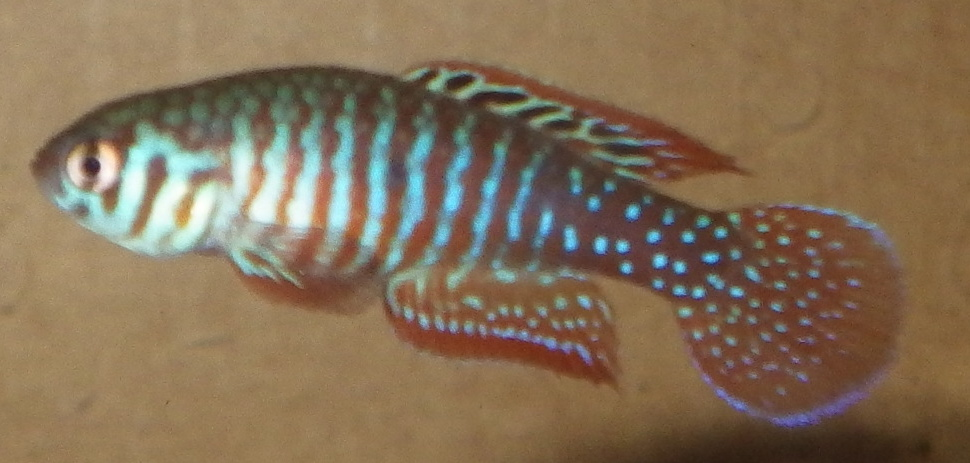

Scientific classification
- Kingdom: Animalia
- Phylum: Chordata
- Class: Actinopterygii
- Order: Cyprinodontiformes
- Family: Rivulidae
- Genus: Simpsonichthys
- Species: S. santanae

Binomial name
- Simpsonichthys santanae (Shibatta & Garavello, 1992)

Synonyms
- Cynolebias santanae Shibatta & Garavello, 1992

= Simpsonichthys santanae =

Species of fish

Simpsonichthys santanae is a species of killifish from the family Rivulidae native to the Paraná River basin in South America. This species reaches a length of 3.0 cm (1.2 in).

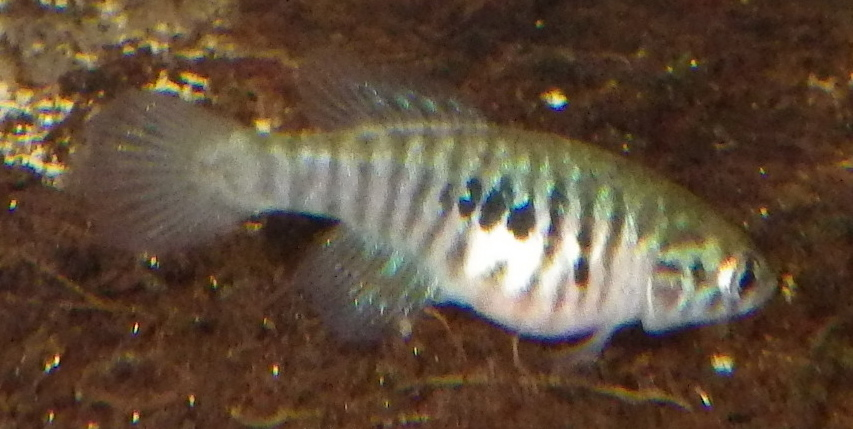
S. santanae female
