= Notholebias =

Scientific classification
- Kingdom: Animalia
- Phylum: Chordata
- Class: Actinopterygii
- Division: Teleostei
- Order: Cyprinodontiformes
- Family: Rivulidae
- Genus: Notholebias; W. J. E. M. Costa, 2008

Type species
- Cynolebias minimus G. S. Myers, 1942

Genus of fishes

Notholebias is a genus of fish in the family Rivulidae. These threatened annual killifish are endemic temporary waters, like ponds, in the Atlantic Forest in Rio de Janeiro state, Brazil (the equally threatened killifish genera Leptolebias and Nematolebias are restricted to the same state).

They are small fish that are up to 4 cm (1.6 in) in total length. Like other killifish, the males are more colorful than the females and the primary difference between the species is the male colors.

== Species ==
Notholebias was formerly included in Leptolebias. There are currently four recognized species of Notholebias:

- Notholebias cruzi (W. J. E. M. Costa, 1988)
- Notholebias fractifasciatus (W. J. E. M. Costa, 1988)
- Notholebias minimus (G. S. Myers, 1942) (barredtail pearlfish)
- Notholebias vermiculatus W. J. E. M. Costa & Amorim, 2013
