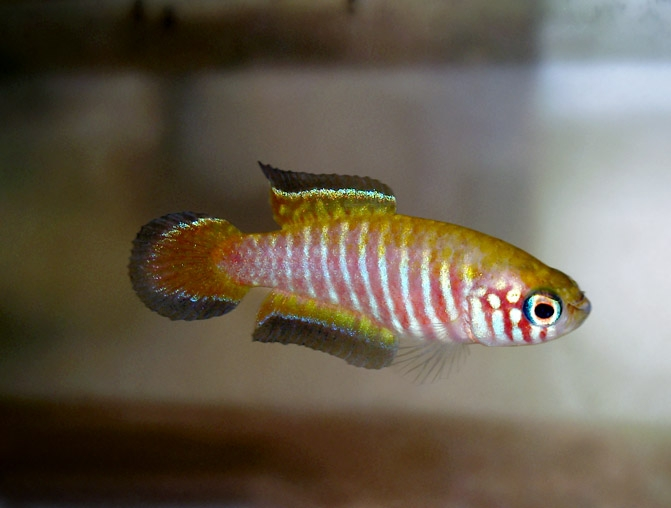
- Simpsonichthys parallelus

Scientific classification
- Kingdom: Animalia
- Phylum: Chordata
- Class: Actinopterygii
- Order: Cyprinodontiformes
- Family: Rivulidae
- Genus: Simpsonichthys; A. L. de Carvalho, 1959

Type species
- Simpsonichthys boitonei A. L. de Carvalho, 1959

= Simpsonichthys =

Genus of fishes

Simpsonichthys is a genus of killifish from the family Rivulidae the species of which are endemic to temporary freshwater habitats like ponds in the upper Paraná, upper Araguaia, upper Jequitinhonha and São Francisco basins on the central Brazilian Plateau. They are small annual killifish that reach up to 5.5 cm (2.2 in) in standard length.

== Species ==
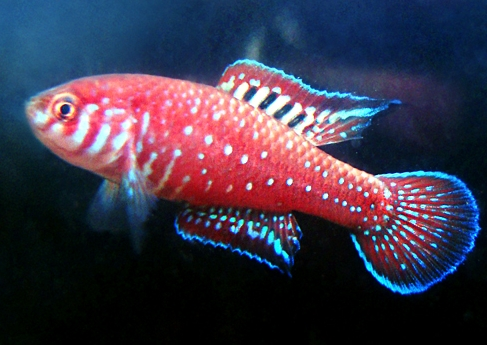
Simpsonichthys boitonei

As delineated by Fishbase the following species are included within the genus Simpsonichthys:

- Simpsonichthys alternatus (W. J. E. M. Costa & G. C. Brasil, 1994)
- Simpsonichthys boitonei A. L. de Carvalho, 1959 (Lyrefin pearlfish)
- Simpsonichthys bokermanni (Carvalho, da & Cruz, 1987)
- Simpsonichthys cholopteryx W. J. E. M. Costa, C. L. R. Moreira & F. C. T. Lima, 2003
- Simpsonichthys constanciae (G. S. Myers), 1942 (Featherfin pearlfish)
- Simpsonichthys delucai Costa, 2003
- Simpsonichthys espinhacensis Nielsen, Pessali & Dutra, 2017
- Simpsonichthys fasciatus Costa & Brasil, 2006
- Simpsonichthys gibberatus Costa & Brasil, 2006
- Simpsonichthys margaritatus Costa, 2012
- Simpsonichthys marginatus Costa & Brasil, 1996
- Simpsonichthys multiradiatus Costa & Brasil, 1994
- Simpsonichthys nielseni Costa, 2005
- Simpsonichthys nigromaculatus Costa, 2007
- Simpsonichthys ocellatus Costa, Nielsen & de Luca 2001
- Simpsonichthys parallelus Costa, 2000
- Simpsonichthys perpendicularis Costa, Nielsen, de & Luca, 2001
- Simpsonichthys punctulatus Costa & Brasil, 2007
- Simpsonichthys rosaceus Costa, Nielsen, de & Luca, 2001
- Simpsonichthys rufus Costa, Nielsen, de & Luca, 2001
- Simpsonichthys santanae (Shibatta & Garavello, 1992)
- Simpsonichthys similis Costa & Hellner, 1999
- Simpsonichthys stellatus (Costa & Brasil, 1994)
- Simpsonichthys suzarti Costa, 2004
- Simpsonichthys trilineatus (Costa & Brasil, 1994)
- Simpsonichthys virgulatus (Costa & Brasil, 2006)
- Simpsonichthys zonatus (Costa & Brasil, 1990)

Simpsonichthys sensu lato was formerly one of the larger genera in the family, but four former subgenera were elevated to full genera in 2010: Hypsolebias, Ophthalmolebias, Spectrolebias and Xenurolebias. Some uncertainty remains, with one genetic study supporting them, while another genetic study indicates that Simpsonichthys (sensu stricto), Hypsolebias and Spectrolebias are not monophyletic.

With these as separate genera, there are currently 9 recognized species in Simpsonichthys:

- Simpsonichthys boitonei
- Simpsonichthys cholopteryx
- Simpsonichthys espinhacensis
- Simpsonichthys margaritatus
- Simpsonichthys nigromaculatus
- Simpsonichthys parallelus
- Simpsonichthys punctulatus
- Simpsonichthys santanae
- Simpsonichthys zonatus

The name of this genus is a compound of the name of a friend of Antenor Leitão de Carvalho's, Charles J. Simpson of San Francisco, and the Greek for fish, ichthys.
