= Nematolebias whitei =

Conservation status
- Critically endangered, possibly extinct (IUCN 3.1)

Scientific classification
- Kingdom: Animalia
- Phylum: Chordata
- Class: Actinopterygii
- Order: Cyprinodontiformes
- Family: Rivulidae
- Genus: Nematolebias
- Species: N. whitei

Binomial name
- Nematolebias whitei (G. S. Myers, 1942)

Synonyms
- Cynolebias whitei Myers, 1942; Cynolebias elegans (Ladiges, 1958); Leptolebias elegans (Ladiges, 1958); Pterolebias elegans Ladiges, 1958

Species of fish

Nematolebias whitei, the Rio pearlfish, is a species of killifish from the family Rivulidae. It is endemic to Brazil where it is found in the Laguna de Araruama basin, Das Ostras River basin and in coastal plains in the vicinity of the mouth of São João River in Rio de Janeiro State. It was introduced to California in the 20th Century but they did not become established there.

Nematolebias whitei is found in small temporary, shallow pools of freshwater on the floodplains of streams and lagoons which have a compact, soft reddish brown muddy substrate and which dry out twice a year. Once during the southern winter in July and August, and again during the southern summer, normally in February and March. When these pools dry out all the fish die and the eggs which have been laid in the muddy bottom go through diapause. When the pools fill up in the wet seasons, in March–April and September–October the eggs hatch.

It is the type species of its genus. The species was described as Cynolebias whitei by George S. Myers in 1942 with the type locality given as a drying out swamp which was 10 or 12 miles (16 or 19 km) north of Cabo Frio in Rio de Janeiro State. The specific name honours Lieutenant-Colonel Thomas D. White (1901–1965) of the U.S. Army Air Corps and who later became Chief of Staff for the U.S. Air Force, who collected the type.
