= Spectrolebias reticulatus =

Conservation status
- Near Threatened (IUCN 3.1)

Scientific classification
- Kingdom: Animalia
- Phylum: Chordata
- Class: Actinopterygii
- Division: Teleostei
- Order: Cyprinodontiformes
- Family: Rivulidae
- Genus: Spectrolebias
- Species: S. reticulatus

Binomial name
- Spectrolebias reticulatus Costa & Nielsen 2003

Species of fish

Spectrolebias reticulatus is a species of annual killifish in the genus Spectrolebias of the family Rivulidae, endemic to seasonal waters in the Paraguay, Tocantins–Araguaia, Xingu and Mamoré–Grande basins in Bolivia, Brazil and Paraguay. like other Spectrolebias species, S. reticulatus is threatened by habitat loss with its entire known range being in the area flooded by the Belo Monte Dam.
