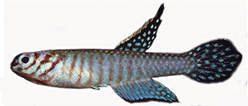
- Male

Conservation status
- Data Deficient (IUCN 3.1)

Scientific classification
- Kingdom: Animalia
- Phylum: Chordata
- Class: Actinopterygii
- Order: Cyprinodontiformes
- Family: Rivulidae
- Genus: Mucurilebias; W. J. E. M. Costa, 2014
- Species: M. leitaoi

Binomial name
- Mucurilebias leitaoi (C. A. G. da Cruz & O. L. Peixoto, 1992)

Synonyms
- Cynolebias leitaoi C. A. G. da Cruz & O. L. Peixoto, 1992; Cynopoecilus leitaoi C. A. G. da Cruz & O. L. Peixoto, 1992; Leptolebias leitaoi C. A. G. da Cruz & O. L. Peixoto, 1992

= Mucurilebias =

Species of fish

Mucurilebias leitaoi is a species of rivulid killifish endemic to Brazil where it occurs, or formerly occurred, in the basin of the Mucuri River. This species can reach a length of 3 centimetres (1.2 in) TL. This species has not been seen since the original series of types was collected in 1988 and it may have become extinct due to the extensive habitat loss in the region. This species is the only known member of its genus, but it was formerly included in Leptolebias. The specific name of this fish honours the Brazilian ichthyologist and herpetologist Antenor Leitão de Carvalho (1910-1985).
