= Cambeva iheringi =

Conservation status
- Least Concern (IUCN 3.1)

Scientific classification
- Kingdom: Animalia
- Phylum: Chordata
- Class: Actinopterygii
- Order: Siluriformes
- Family: Trichomycteridae
- Genus: Cambeva
- Species: C. iheringi

Binomial name
- Cambeva iheringi (C. H. Eigenmann, 1917)

Synonyms
- Pygidium iheringi C. H. Eigenmann, 1917; Trichomycterus iheringi (C. H. Eigenmann, 1917)

Species of fish

Cambeva iheringi is a species of freshwater ray-finned fish belonging to the family Trichomycteridae, the pencil and parasitic catfishes. This catfish is endemic to Brazil in São Paulo and Paraná states, centred on Santos where it is found in the Ribeira do Iguape River basin.

This is an elongate catfish up to 16.1 centimetres (6.3 in) standard length. It has no unique morphological features and can be distinguished from its congeners by a combination of characters including a uniformly buff colouring with small dark spots over the whole body, pelvic fin margin distant from the urogenital opening and rounded caudal fin.
