= Ituglanis parahybae =

Conservation status
- Least Concern (IUCN 3.1)

Scientific classification
- Kingdom: Animalia
- Phylum: Chordata
- Class: Actinopterygii
- Order: Siluriformes
- Family: Trichomycteridae
- Genus: Ituglanis
- Species: I. parahybae

Binomial name
- Ituglanis parahybae (C. H. Eigenmann, 1918)

Synonyms
- Pygidium proops var.parahybae C. H. Eigenmann, 1918

Species of fish

Ituglanis parahybae is a species of freshwater ray-finned fish belonging to the family Trichomycteridae, the pencil and parasitic catfishes. This catfish is endemic to Brazil where it is found in the São João River and the Paraiba River in the states of Rio de Janeiro and São Paulo. This species has a maximum length of 5.1 cm (2.0 in).
