= Thomas D. White =

US Air Force general (1901–1965)

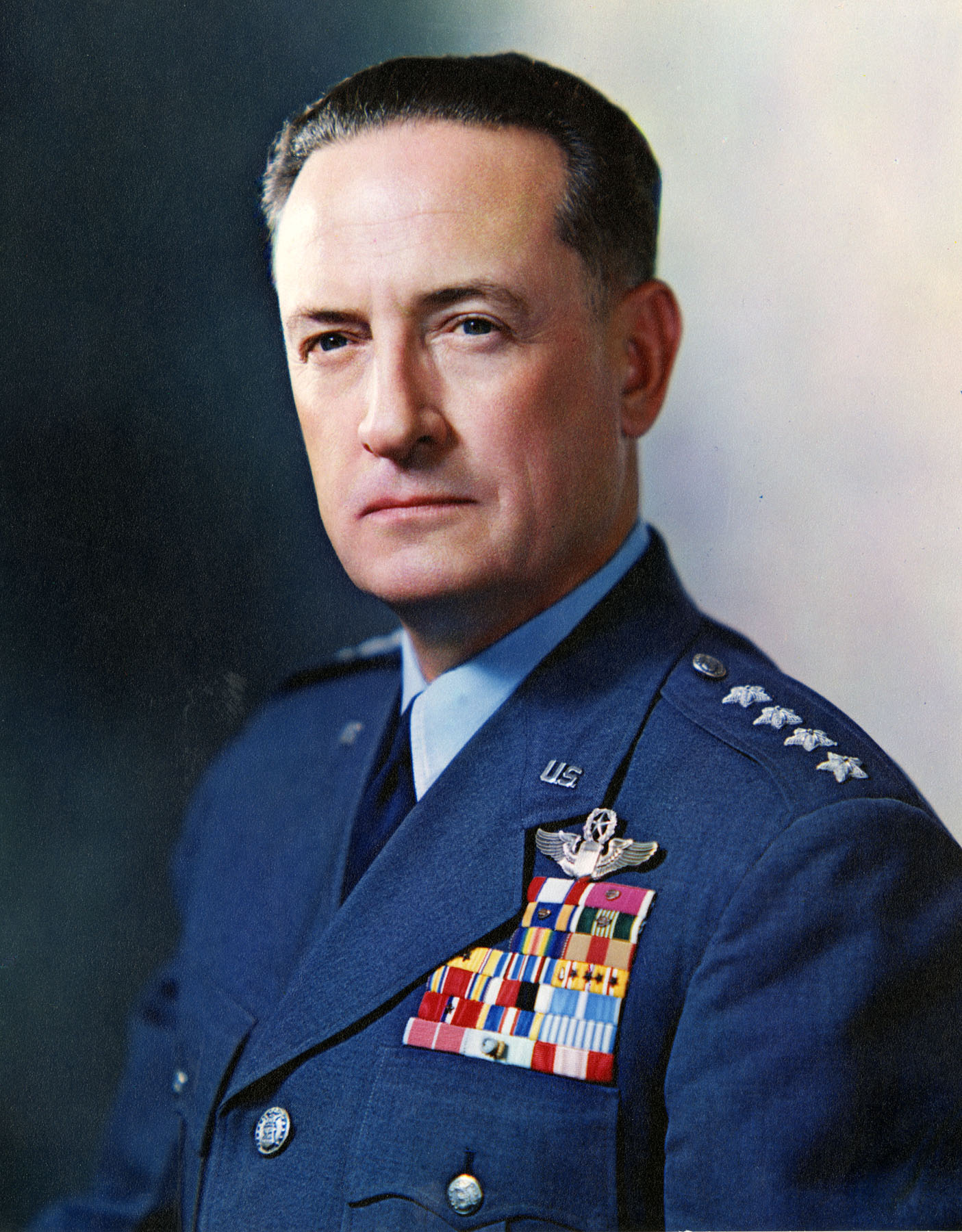
- US Air Force photo
- Born: August 6, 1901; Walker, Minnesota, U.S.
- Died: December 22, 1965 (aged 64); Walter Reed Army Medical Center, Washington D.C., U.S.
- Military career
- Allegiance: United States
- Branch: United States Air Force; United States Army
- Service years: 1920–1961
- Rank: General
- Nickname: Tom
- Commands: Chief of Staff of the United States Air Force; Vice Chief of Staff of the United States Air Force; Fifth Air Force; Seventh Air Force
- Conflicts: World War II; Korean War
- Awards: Army Distinguished Service Medal (2); Legion of Merit (2); Air Medal (2)

General Thomas Dresser White (August 6, 1901 – December 22, 1965) was the fourth Chief of Staff of the United States Air Force.

== Life and military career ==
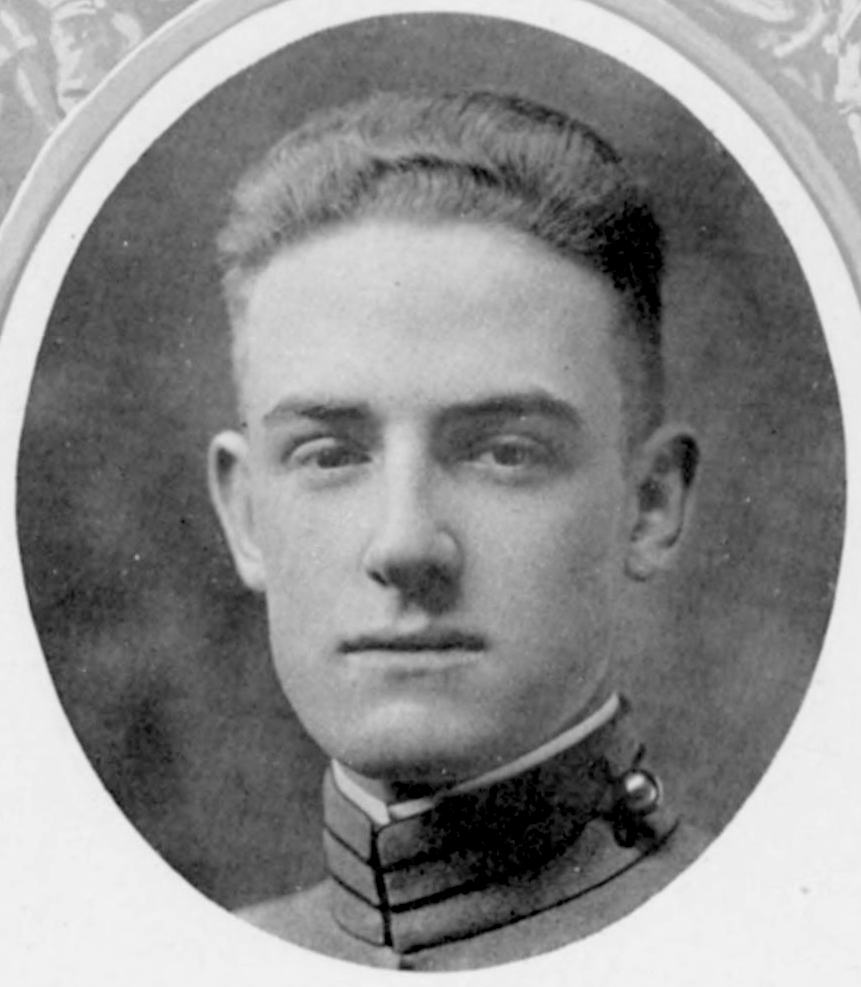
At West Point in 1920

White was born in Walker, Minnesota, on August 6, 1901. His father was John Chanler White. Upon graduation from the United States Military Academy on July 2, 1920, he was commissioned a second lieutenant of Infantry and immediately promoted to first lieutenant.

Entering the Infantry School at Fort Benning, Georgia, White graduated in July 1921, and was assigned duty with the 14th Infantry Regiment at Fort Davis, Panama Canal Zone.

In September 1924, he entered Primary Flying School at Brooks Field, Texas. He graduated from Advanced Flying School at Kelly Field, Texas, in September 1925, and was assigned duty with the 99th Observation Squadron at Bolling Field, Washington, D.C.

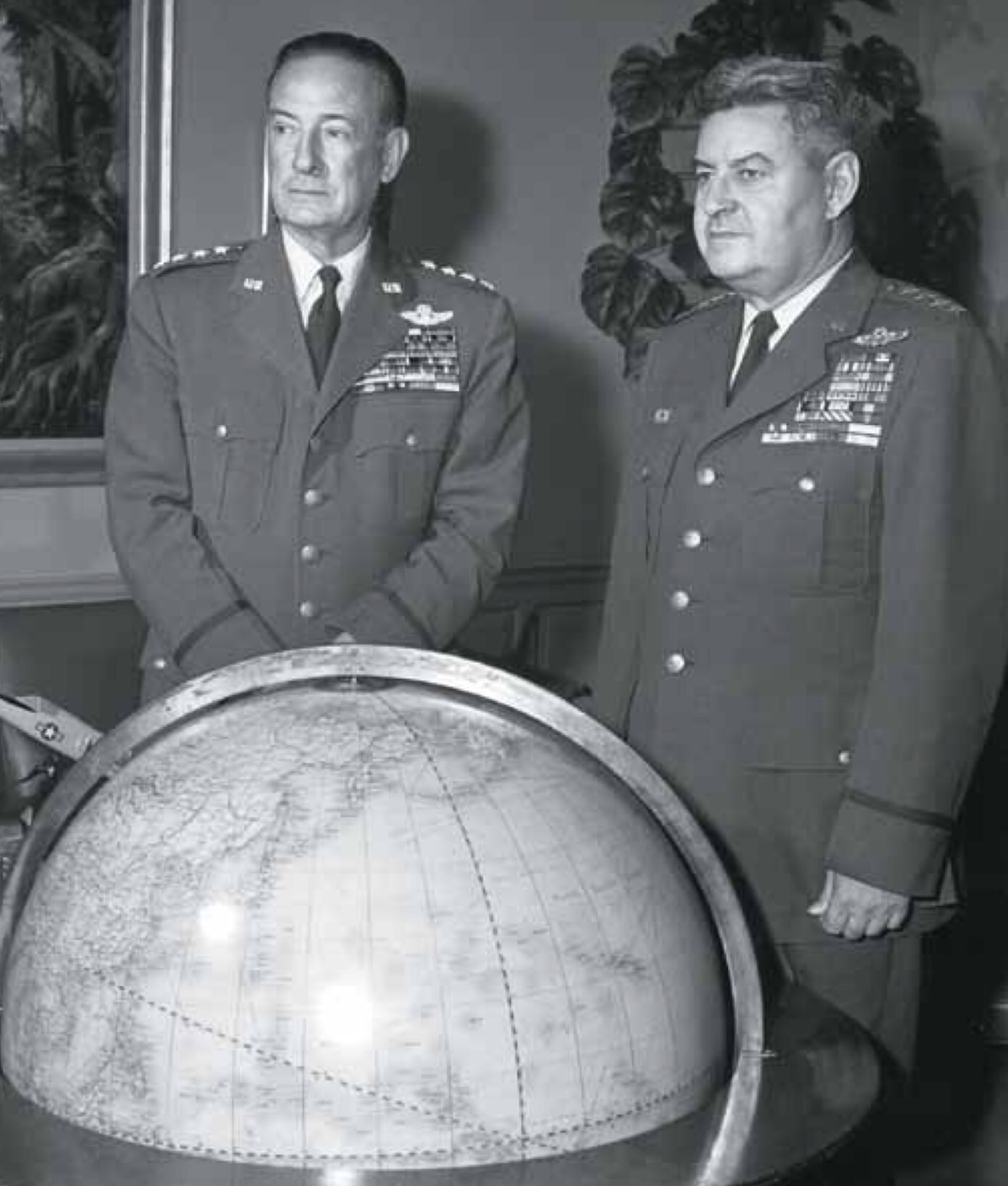
Air Force Chief of Staff General Thomas D. White with Air Force Vice Chief of Staff General Curtis E. LeMay in White's office at The Pentagon in 1957

In June 1927, White was assigned to duty as a student of the Chinese language in Peking, China. Four years later, he returned to the United States for duty at Headquarters Air Corps, Washington, D.C.

White was named assistant military attache for air to Russia in February 1934. A year later, he was appointed assistant military attache for air to Italy and Greece, with station at Rome.

White graduated from the Air Corps Tactical School at Maxwell Field, Alabama, in May 1938. He then entered Command and General Staff School at Fort Leavenworth, Kansas. He was named an outstanding alumni of the class 1939 and upon completion of this training was assigned to the Office of the Chief of Air Corps, Washington, D.C.

In April 1940, White became military attache to Brazil and the following August was named chief of the U.S. Military Air Mission to Brazil.

Returning to the United States in March 1942, White was appointed assistant chief of staff for operations of the Third Air Force at MacDill Field, Florida, and subsequently named chief of staff.

Reassigned to Army Air Forces Headquarters at The Pentagon, Virginia, in January 1944, he became assistant chief of air staff for intelligence.

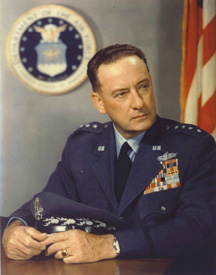
General Thomas D. White in 1960

Proceeding to the Southwest Pacific in September 1944, White assumed duty as the deputy commander of the Thirteenth Air Force, taking part in the campaigns of New Guinea, Southern Philippines and Borneo. The following June, he assumed command of the Seventh Air Force, which had based its headquarters in the Marianas and immediately moved with it to the recently taken Okinawa. In January 1946, he returned with the Seventh Air Force to Hawaii. That October, he was appointed chief of staff of the Pacific Air Command in Tokyo, Japan. One year later, in October 1947, White took command of the Fifth Air Force in Japan.

Transferred to the Office of the Secretary of the Air Force in October 1948, White became director of the Legislation and Liaison. He was appointed, in May 1950, Air Force Member of the Joint Strategic Survey Committee in the Office of the Joint Chiefs of Staff. He was assigned as director of Plans, Headquarters U.S. Air Force, in February 1951, and in July 1951, assumed duties of deputy chief of staff of operations for the Air Force.

White was promoted to the rank of general on June 30, 1953, and designated Vice Chief of Staff of the United States Air Force at that time, becoming Chief of Staff of the United States Air Force on July 1, 1957. He retired June 30, 1961.

== Life after military ==
Right after his retirement White was elected a director in Eastern Air Lines.

General White was the 1963 recipient of the General William E. Mitchell Memorial Award, which was awarded "the United States citizen making the outstanding individual contribution to aviation progress."

White was a fisherman, aquarist and amateur ichthyologist and while in Brazil he collected Zoological specimens with his wife, Constance, including the type of the Rio pearlfish Nematolebias whitei which was named in his honor.

He died at Walter Reed Army Medical Center on December 22, 1965, of leukemia, and is buried at Arlington National Cemetery.

He was posthumously inducted into the National Aviation Hall of Fame in 2011.

== Awards and decorations ==
US Air Force Command Pilot Badge

Army Distinguished Service Medal with one bronze oak leaf cluster
Legion of Merit with oak leaf cluster
Air Medal with oak leaf cluster
Army Commendation Medal with oak leaf cluster
World War I Victory Medal
Marine Corps Expeditionary Medal
American Defense Service Medal with one bronze service star
American Campaign Medal
Asiatic-Pacific Campaign Medal with Arrowhead device and four service stars
World War II Victory Medal
Army of Occupation Medal
National Defense Service Medal with service star
Korean Service Medal
Air Force Longevity Service Award with silver and three bronze oak leaf clusters
Air Force Longevity Service Award
Philippine Liberation Medal with service star
Philippine Independence Medal
Order of the British Empire, Military version
Order of Merit of the Italian Republic, Knight Grand Cross
Order of Orange-Nassau, Knight Grand Cross with Swords (Netherlands, 21 February 1962)
Order of the Southern Cross, Grand Officer (Brazil)
Order of the Rising Sun, grade unknown (Japan)
United Nations Korea Medal

- White received at least two more foreign decorations.

Military offices
Preceded by Nathan F. Twining	Vice Chief of Staff of the United States Air Force; 1953–1957	Succeeded by Curtis E. LeMay
Preceded by Nathan F. Twining	Chief of Staff of the United States Air Force; 1957–1961	Succeeded by Curtis E. LeMay
