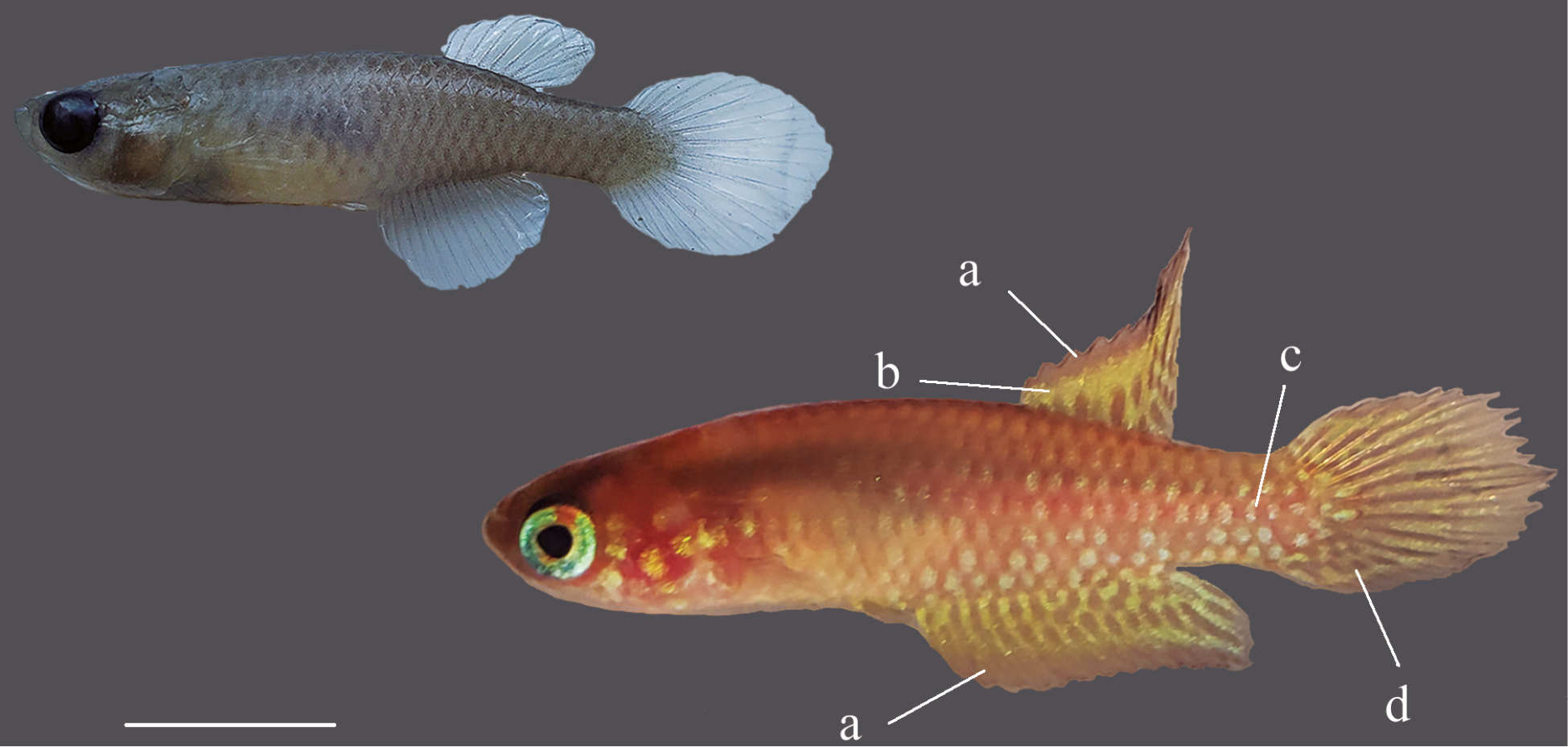

Conservation status
- Critically Endangered (IUCN 3.1)

Scientific classification
- Kingdom: Animalia
- Phylum: Chordata
- Class: Actinopterygii
- Order: Cyprinodontiformes
- Family: Rivulidae
- Genus: Leptolebias
- Species: L. opalescens

Binomial name
- Leptolebias opalescens Myers, 1942
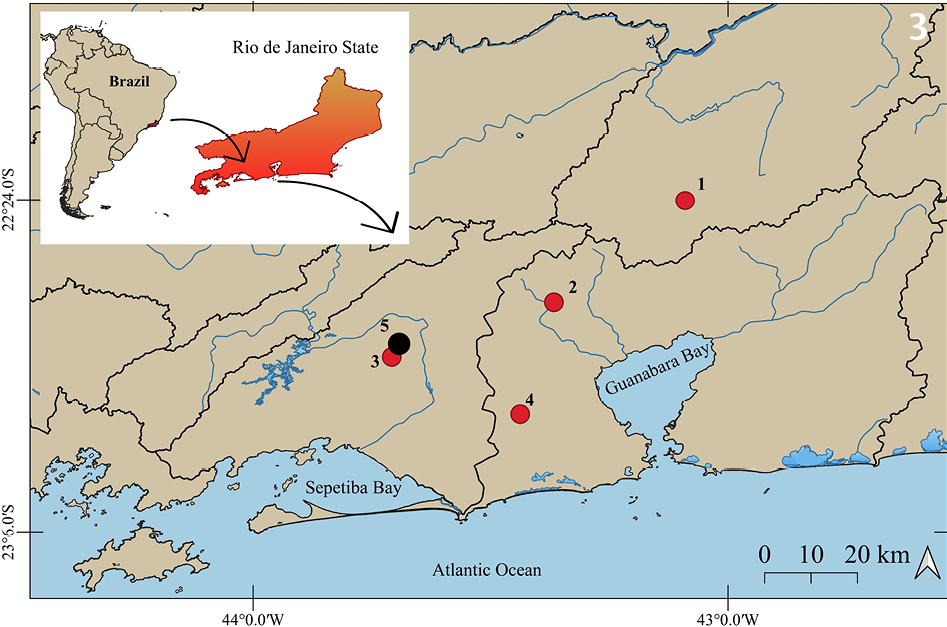

Synonyms
- Leptopanchax opalescens (Myers, 1942); Cynolebias opalescens Myers, 1942; Cynopoecilus opalescens (Myers, 1942); Cynopoecilus fluminensis Faria & Muller, 1937; Leptolebias fluminensis (Faria & Muller, 1937); Cynolebias nanus da Cruz & Peixoto, 1983; Cynopoecilus nanus (da Cruz & Peixoto, 1983)

= Leptolebias opalescens =

Species of fish

Leptolebias opalescens, also known as the opal pearlfish, annual tropical killifish or opalescent pearlfish, is a species of killifish in the family Aplocheilidae endemic to Brazil. This species was described as Cynolebias opalescens by George S. Myers in 1942 with the type locality given as the base of the Serra do Petrópolis, near Imbarié in the municipality of Duque de Caxias, Rio de Janeiro.
