= Leptolebias splendens =

Conservation status
- Critically Endangered (IUCN 3.1)

Scientific classification
- Kingdom: Animalia
- Phylum: Chordata
- Class: Actinopterygii
- Order: Cyprinodontiformes
- Family: Rivulidae
- Genus: Leptolebias
- Species: L. splendens

Binomial name
- Leptolebias splendens (Myers, 1942)

Synonyms
- Leptolepanchax splendens (Myers, 1942); Cynolebias splendens Myers, 1942; Cynopoecilus splendens (Myers, 1942); Cynopoecilus sandrii Faria & Muller, 1937

Species of fish

Leptolebias splendens, also known as the splendid pearlfish or annual tropical killifish, is a species of killifish in the family Rivulidae endemic to Brazil, in the vicinity of Rio de Janeiro. This species was described as Cynolebias splendens in 1942 by George S. Myers with the type locality given as water holes or ponds along the foot of the Serra de Petropolis in Rio de Janeiro State. Deforestation and urbanisation led to the species disappearance from the area of its type locality and it was thought to be extinct but it was rediscovered 5 kilometres (3.1 miles) from the type locality some 70 years after the last known previous record.
