= Paracatu River =

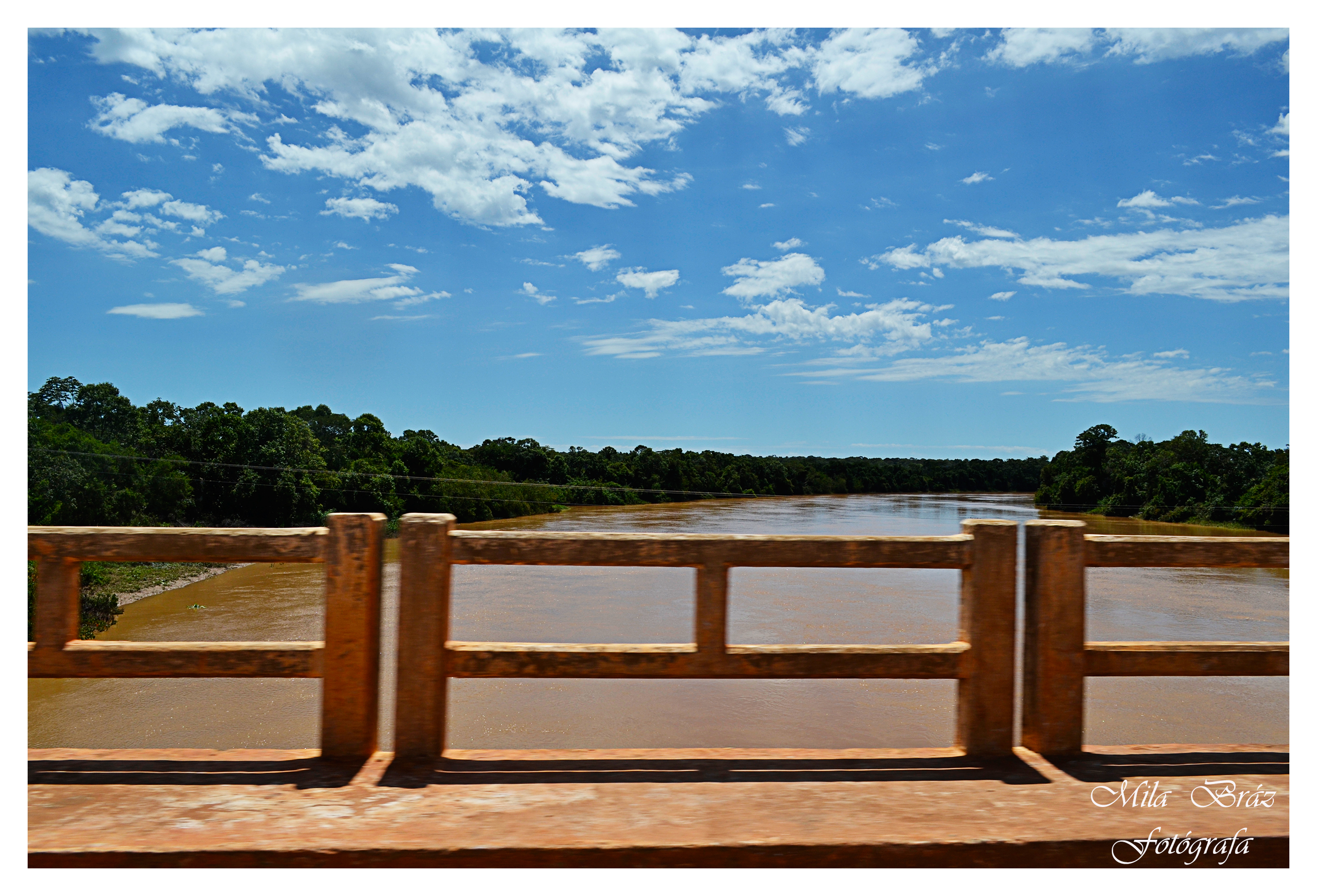

Location
- Country: Brazil

Physical characteristics
- Source
  - location: Goiás state
- Mouth: São Francisco River
  - location: Minas Gerais state
  - coordinates: 16.5700°S 45.1075°W
- Length: 485 km (301 mi)
- Basin size: 45,000 km^{2} (17,000 sq mi)

The Paracatu River (Portuguese: Rio Paracatu) is located mainly in the state of Minas Gerais in Brazil. It is the longest tributary of the São Francisco, draining a basin of about 45,000 km^{2}, including 21 municipalities and the Federal District. The basin is almost completely located in the state of Minas Gerais (19 municipalities), including only three municipalities in the state of Goiás.

The river has a length of 485 kilometres (301 mi). Its main tributary, the Preto, has its source in Lagoa Feia near Formosa in the state of Goiás and it forms the boundary with the Federal District.

== Etymology ==
"Paracatu" comes from the Tupi language. Originally parakatu the name comes from a junction of the words para, meaning "river" and katu meaning "good" or "clean".
