= Wilson José Eduardo Moreira da Costa =

Brazilian ichthyologist

Wilson José Eduardo Moreira da Costa (born in 1958) is a Brazilian ichthyologist and taxon authority. He is a professor at the Institute of Biology at the Federal University of Rio de Janeiro, with a degree in biological sciences (UFRJ) and a PhD in zoology (USP).

Costa is a reviewer for several international journals in the areas of ichthyology, zoology and evolution, and has written more than 250 journal papers himself. Furthermore he has discovered and described more than 160 species of fish.

The pencil catfish Listrura costai Villa-Verde, Lazzarotto & Lima, 2012 was named in honor of da Costa.

== See also ==
- Category:Taxa named by Wilson José Eduardo Moreira da Costa
