= Futurism (literature) =

Modernist movement originally from Italy

Futurism is a modernist literary movement which developed out of the broader Futurist movement in 20th century Italy. The principles of literary Futurism were first elaborated in Filippo Tommaso Marinetti's Manifesto of Futurism (1909). Futurist poetry is characterised by concision and idiosyncratic combinations of imagery. Futurist theatre also played an important role within the movement, and is distinguished by scenes lasting only a few sentences, nonsensical humour, and parodic subversions of theatric traditions. Since the style privileges speed and compression, longer literary forms like the novel are less represented in Futurist literature, though notable exceptions include Filippo Tommaso Marinetti's Mafarka the Futurist (1909) and Aldo Palazzeschi's Man of Smoke (1911).

Futurist literature primarily focuses on seven aspects: intuition, analogy, irony, abolition of syntax, metrical reform, onomatopoeia, and essential/synthetic lyricism. Futurist ideals expanded to sculpture and painting as well. They rejected the cubist movement in France, the values of renaissance art, and often advocated for traditionalism in their writings and artwork. Although the movement was founded by manifestos written by men, there were responses to Marinetti from women who considered themselves traditional feminists and rejected the Futurist assertion that the renaissance movement represented a cultural shift towards emasculation, but relied too much on the traditional titles of "men" and "women" that pigeonholed society into believing they couldn't be empathetic and that a woman couldn't be vigorous.

== Methodology ==
=== Intuition ===
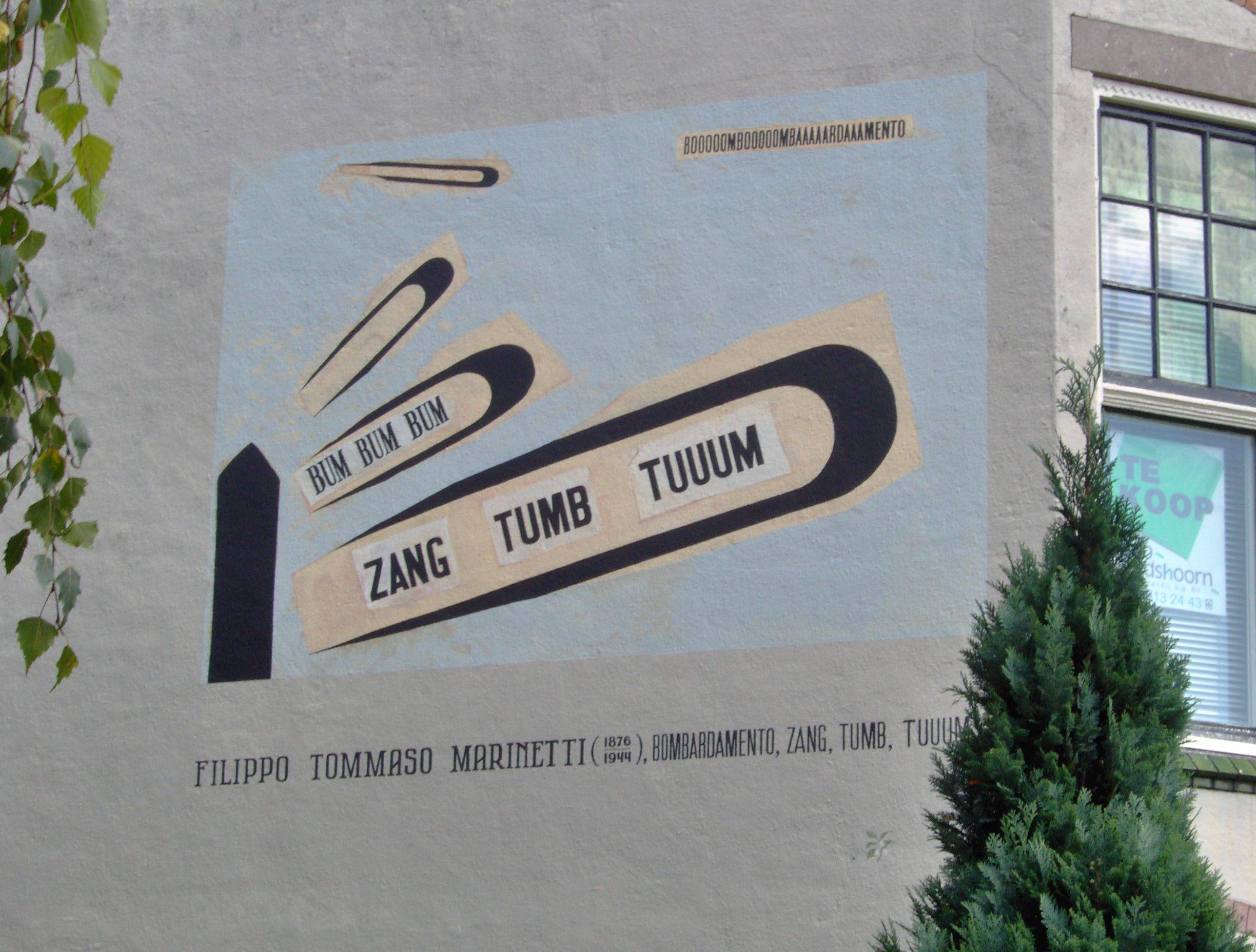
The Futurist poem "Zang tumb tumb" by Filippo Tommaso Marinetti, on a wall in Leiden, The Netherlands

In Marinetti's 1909 manifesto, Marinetti calls for the reawakening of "divine intuition" that "after hours of relentless toil" allows for the "creative spirit seems suddenly to shake off its shackles and become prey to an incomprehensible spontaneity of conception and execution".

Soffici had a more earthly reasoning. Intuition was the means by which creation took place. He believed that there could be no abstraction of the values of futurist literature in logical terms. Rather, art was a language in and of itself that could only be expressed in that language. Any attempt to extrapolate from the literature resulted "in the evaluation not of artistic qualities but of extraneous matters". As such, the spontaneous creation brought by intuition freed one from abstracting (and therefore adding erroneous material into the literature) and allowed one to speak in the language of art.

In this way, Futurists rallied against "intellectualistic literature…[and] intelligible poetry". However, this idea is different from anti-intellectualism. They were not hostile to intellectual approaches, but just the specific intellectual approach that poetry had taken for so many years. Therefore, they often rejected any form of tradition as it had been tainted with the previous intellectual approaches of the past.

=== Analogy ===
Analogy's purpose in Futurist writing was to show that everything related to one another. They helped to unveil this true reality lying underneath the surface of existence. That is to say, despite what the experience might show one, everything is in fact interconnected. The more startling the comparison, the more successful it is.

The means for creating these analogies is intuition. This intuition is "the poet's peculiar quality in that it enables him to discover analogies which, hidden to reason, are yet the essentials of art". The discovering of analogies is made possible by intuition.

Marinetti believed that analogies had always existed, but earlier poets had not reached out enough to bring appropriately disparate entities together. By creating a communion of two (or more) seemingly unrelated objects, the poet pierces to the "essence of reality". The farther the poet has to reach in terms of logical remoteness is in direct proportion to its efficacy.

As analogy thus plays such an important role, it "offers a touchstone to gauge poetical values…: the power to startle. The artistic criterion derived from analogy is stupefaction". While an ordinary person's vision is colored by convention and tradition, the poet can brush away this top layer to reveal the reality below. The process of communicating the surprise is art while the "stupefaction" is the reaction to this discovery. Thus, analogies are the essence of poetry for the Futurists.

=== Irony ===
As the Futurists advocated the aforementioned intuition and the bucking of tradition, one might assume that they would suppress the use of irony. On the contrary, irony proved to be "so old and forgotten that it looked almost new when the dust was brushed away from it. What was new and untried, at least more so than their principles and theories, were the futurists' stylistic devices".

=== Abolition of syntax ===
Futurists believed that the constraints of syntax were inappropriate to modern life and that it did not truly represent the mind of the poet. Syntax would act as a filter in which analogies had to be processed and so analogies would lose their characteristic "stupefaction." By abolishing syntax, the analogies would become more effective. The practical realization of this ideal meant that many parts of speech were discarded: Adjectives were thought to bring nuance in "a universe which is…black and white"; the infinitive provided all the idea of an action one needed without the hindrances of conjugation; substantives followed their linked substantives without other words (by the notion of analogy). Punctuation, moods, and tenses, also disappeared in order to be consistent with analogy and "stupefaction."

However, the Futurists were not truly abolishing syntax. White points out that since "The OED defines 'syntax' as 'the arrangement of words in their proper forms' by which their connection and relation in a sentence are shown". The Futurists were not destroying syntax in that sense. Marinetti in truth advocated a number of "substantial, but nevertheless selective modifications to existing syntax" and that the "Russian Futurists' idea that they were 'shaking syntax loose'" is more accurate.

=== Metrical reform ===
Early Futurist poetry relied on free verse as their poetical vehicle. However, free verse "was too thoroughly bound up with tradition and too fond of producing…stale effects" to be effective. Furthermore, by using free verse, the Futurist realized they would be working under the rules of syntax and therefore interfering with intuition and inspiration.

In order to break free of the shackles of meter, they resorted to what they called "parole in libertá (word autonomy)". Essentially, all ideas of meter were rejected and the word became the main unit of concern instead of the meter. In this way, the Futurists managed to create a new language free of syntax punctuation, and metrics that allowed for free expression.

For example, in the poem entitled "Studio" by Soffici, he "describes the artist's studio—and by extension, modern man himself—as becoming a 'radiotelefantastic cabin open to all messages', the sense of wonder her being transmitted by the portmanteau neologism: 'readotelefantastica'". Here all notions of familiar language have been abandoned and in their place a new language has emerged with its own vocabulary.

=== Onomatopoeia ===
There were four forms of onomatopoeia that the Futurists advocated: direct, indirect, integral, and abstract. The first of these four is the usually onomatopoeia seen in typical poetry, e.g. boom, splash, tweet. They convey the most realistic translation of sound into language. Indirect onomatopoeia "expressed the subjective responses to external conditions".

Integral onomatopoeia was "the introduction of any and every sound irrespective of its similarity to significant words". This meant that any collection of letters could represent a sound. The final form of onomatopoeia did not reference external sounds or movements like the aforementioned versions of onomatopoeia. Rather, they tried to capture the internal motions of the soul.

=== Essential/synthetic lyricism ===
In order to better provide stark, contrasting, analogies, the Futurist literature promoted a kind of hyper-conciseness. It was dubbed essential and synthetic lyricism. The former refers to a paring down of any and all superfluous objects while the latter expresses an unnatural compactness of the language unseen elsewhere. This idea explains where poetry became the preferred literary medium of Futurism and why there are no Futurist novels (since novels are neither pared down nor compressed).

== Futurism in theatre ==
Traditional theatre often served as a target for Futurists because of its deep roots in classical societies. In its stead, the Futurists exalted the variety theatre, vaudeville, and music hall because, they argued, it "had no tradition; it was a recent discovery". Vaudevillian acts aligned themselves well to the notions of "stupefaction" as there was the desire to surprise and excite the audience. Furthermore, the heavy use of machinery attracted the Futurists, as well as Vaudevillian acts' tendency to "destroy" the masterpieces of the past through parody and other forms of depreciation.

By adding other Futurist ideals mentioned above, they firmly rooted their beliefs into theatre. They wanted to blur the line between art and life in order to reach below the surface to reality. In practice, this manifested itself in various ways:

"Collaboration between the public and the actors was to be developed to the point of indistinction of roles—such cooperating confusion was to be partly impromptu…e.g. chairs were to be covered with glue so that ladies' gowns would stick to them; and tickets sold in such a way as to bring side by side men of the extreme right and those of the extreme left, prudes and prostitutes, teachers and pupils. Sneezing powders, sudden darkening of the hall, and alarm signals were all means to insure the proper functioning of this universal human farce".

However, the most important aspect of the work was the discrediting of the great works of theatre. These new theatrical ideal of the Futurists helped to establish a new genre of theatre: the synthetic play.

=== Synthetic play ===
This type of play took the idea of compression to an extreme, where "a brief performance in which entire acts were reduced to a few sentences, and scenes to a handful of words. No sentiments, no psychological development, no atmosphere, no suggestiveness. Common sense was banished, or rather, replaced by nonsense". There did exist some plays similar to this before the Futurists, but they did not conform to the Futurist agenda. The creator of the first modern synthetic play is thought to be Verlaine, with his aptly titled work Excessive Haste.

== Futurism in Art Work ==
It took some time during the development of the movement to take shape in all the areas the futurists wanted to explore in order to visually represent their message especially in two-dimensional paintings. Their hybrid-style of human and machine or showing a forward motion was common due to their worship of the modern machine and technology. One of the most popular representations of this is in the piece "Dynamism of the dog by Giacomo Balla. This piece shows a dog being walked on a lease and rather than the typical four-legged representation the dog has multiple feet in a swishing type motion to suggest movement. This piece along with the others that followed was referred to as "Dynamism": "No single object is separate from its background or another object."

== List of futurist poets by region ==
=== Czechoslovakia ===
- Stanislav Kostka Neumann
- Vítězslav Nezval
- Jaroslav Seifert

=== Italy ===
- Libero Altomare
- Paolo Buzzi
- Enrico Cardile
- Loris Catrizzi
- Enrico Cavacchioli
- Auroa D'Alba
- Escodame
- Farfa
- Fillia
- Luciano Folgore
- Filippo Tommaso Marinetti
- Armando Mazza
- Aldo Palazzeschi
- Giovanni Papini
- Bruno G. Sanzin
- Ruggero Vasari

=== Poland ===
- Tytus Czyżewski
- Jan Hrynkowski
- Jerzy Jankowski
- Bruno Jasieński
- Anatol Stern
- Aleksander Wat
- Stanisław Młodożeniec

=== Russia ===
- Nikolay Aseev
- Bozhidar
- Vasilisk Gnedov
- Vasily Kamensky
- Velemir Khlebnikov
- Aleksey Kruchenykh
- Vladimir Mayakovsky
- Igor Severyanin
- Vadim Shershenevich

=== Slovenia ===
- Srecko Kosovel
- Anton Podbevšek
- Vladimir Premru

=== Turkey ===
- Nâzım Hikmet

=== Portugal and Brazil ===
- Mário de Andrade
- Tyrteu Rocha Vianna
- Álvaro de Campos
- Mário de Sá-Carneiro
- Sérgio Milliet
- Almada Negreiros

=== Ukraine ===
- David Burliuk
- Vasyl Aleshko
- Mykola Bazhan, former member of Komunkult
- Oleksa Slisarenko, former member of Komunkult
- Mykhailo Semenko
- Mykhailo Yalovy, former member of Komunkult

=== England ===
- Mina Loy

=== Lithuania ===
- Kazys Binkis
