= Farfa =

Farfa is an Italian name which can refer to:

- A place name in the province of the Lazio in Italy, as:
  - Farfa River, a river of the province of Rieti
  - Farfa Abbey, one of the main medieval abbeys in Italy
- A personal name, as:
  - Farfa (poet), an Italian Futurist poet (1881–1964)
- An alias, as:
  - Farfa (YouTuber)
