= Futurism =

Artistic and social movement

Gino Severini, Dynamic Hieroglyphic of the Bal Tabarin (1912), oil on canvas with sequins, Museum of Modern Art, New York City

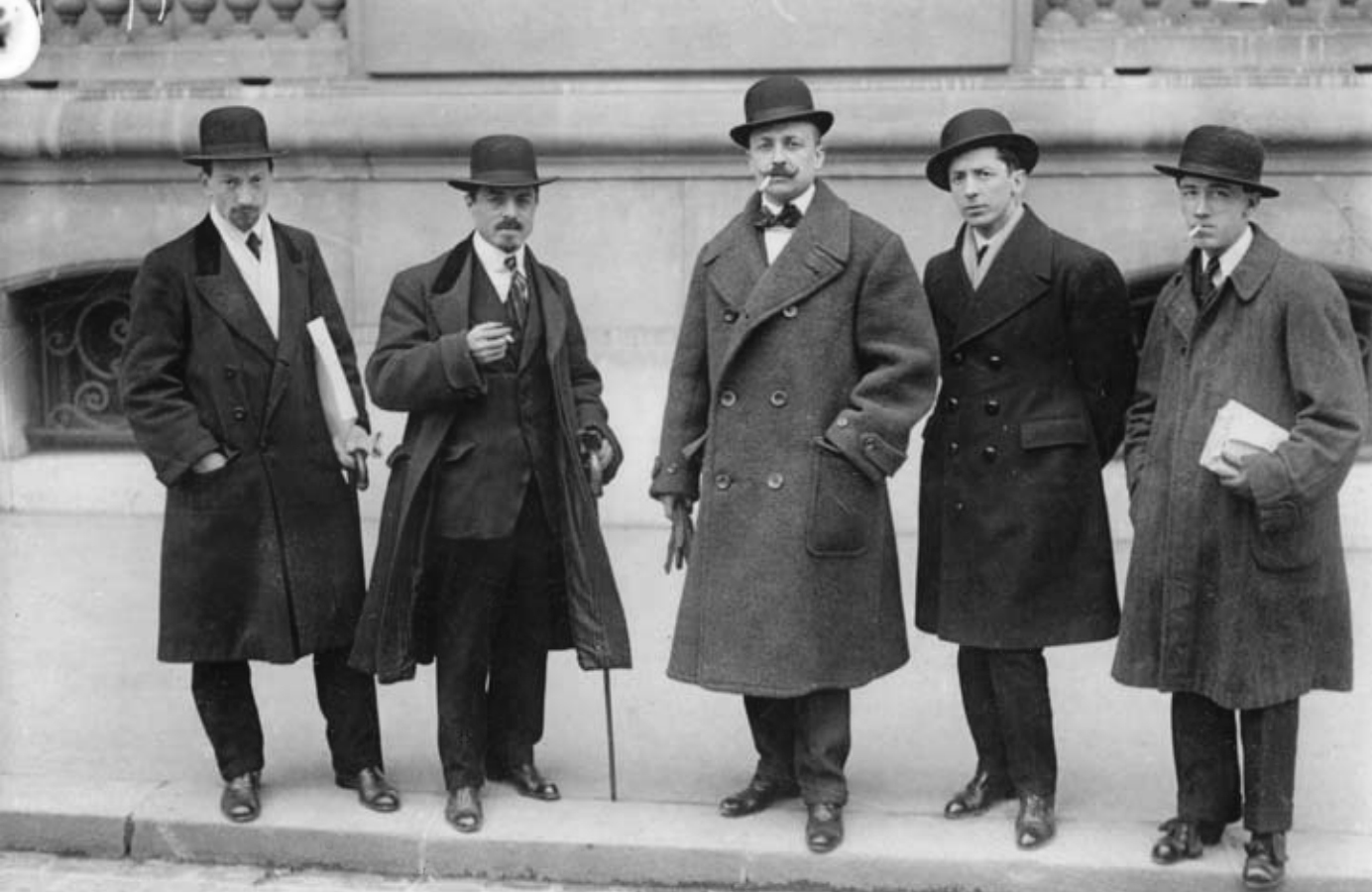
Italian Futurists Luigi Russolo, Carlo Carrà, Filippo Tommaso Marinetti, Umberto Boccioni, and Gino Severini in front of Le Figaro, Paris (February 9, 1912)

Futurism (Italian: Futurismo [futuˈrizmo]) was an artistic and social movement that originated in Italy, and to a lesser extent in other countries, in the early 20th century. It emphasized dynamism, speed, technology, youth, violence, and objects such as the car, the airplane, and the industrial city. Its key figures included Italian artists Filippo Tommaso Marinetti, Umberto Boccioni, Carlo Carrà, Fortunato Depero, Gino Severini, Giacomo Balla, and Luigi Russolo. Italian Futurism glorified modernity and, according to its doctrine, "aimed to liberate Italy from the weight of its past." Important Futurist works included Marinetti's 1909 Manifesto of Futurism, Boccioni's 1913 sculpture Unique Forms of Continuity in Space, Balla's 1913–1914 painting Abstract Speed + Sound, and Russolo's The Art of Noises (1913).

Although Futurism was largely an Italian phenomenon, parallel movements emerged in the Russian Empire, where some Russian Futurists would later go on to found groups of their own; other countries either had a few Futurists or had movements inspired by Futurism. The Futurists practiced in every medium of art, including painting, sculpture, ceramics, graphic design, industrial design, interior design, urban design, theatre, film, fashion, textiles, literature, music, architecture, and cuisine.

To some extent, Futurism influenced the art movements Art Deco, Constructivism, Surrealism, and Dada; to a greater degree, Precisionism, Rayonism, and Vorticism. Passéism can represent an opposing trend or attitude.

== Italian Futurism ==
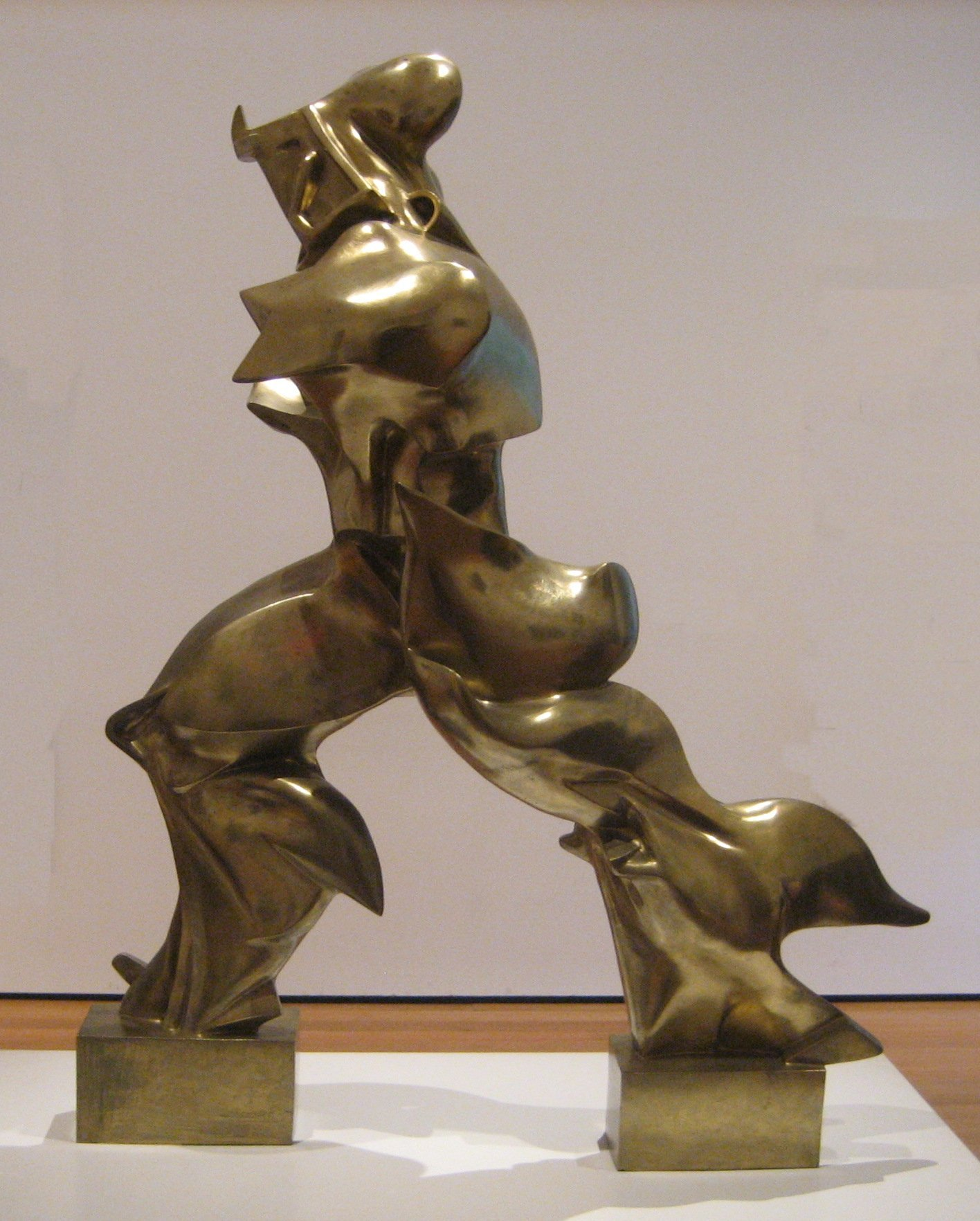
Umberto Boccioni, Unique Forms of Continuity in Space (1913), bronze cast in 1931 or 1934, Museum of Modern Art, New York City

Futurism is an avant-garde movement founded in Milan, Italy in 1909 by the Italian art theorist and poet Filippo Tommaso Marinetti. Marinetti launched the movement in his Manifesto of Futurism, which he published for the first time on 5 February 1909 in La gazzetta dell'Emilia, an article then reproduced in the French daily newspaper Le Figaro on Saturday 20 February 1909. He was soon joined by the painters Umberto Boccioni, Carlo Carrà, Giacomo Balla, Gino Severini, and the composer Luigi Russolo. Marinetti expressed a passionate loathing of everything old, especially political and artistic traditions: "We want no part of it, the past", [...] we the young and strong Futurists!". The Futurists admired speed, technology, youth, violence, the car, the airplane, and the industrial city, all that represented the technological triumph of humanity over nature, and they were passionate Italian nationalists. They glorified modernity and repudiated the cult of the past and all imitations, praised originality "however daring, however violent", bore proudly "the smear of madness", dismissed art critics as useless, rebelled against harmony and good taste, swept away all the themes and subjects of all previous art, and glorified science.

Publishing manifestos was a feature of Futurism, and the Futurists (usually led or prompted by Marinetti) wrote them on many topics, including painting, architecture, music, literature, theatre, cinema, photography, religion, women, fashion, and cuisine. In their manifestos, Futurists described their beliefs and appreciations of various methods. They also detailed their disdain for traditional Italian Renaissance works of art and their subjects. According to the Manifesto of the Futurist Painters (1910) by Umberto Boccioni, Luigi Russolo, Gino Severini, Giacomo Balla, and Carlo Carrà: "We want to fight implacably against the mindless, snobbish, and fanatical religion of the past, religion nurtured by the pernicious existence of the museums. We rebel against the spineless admiration for old canvases, old statues, and old objects, and against the enthusiasm for everything worm-eaten, grimy, or corroded by time; and we deem it unjust and criminal that people habitually disdain whatever is young, new, and trembling with life." The Futurists believed that art should be inspired by the modern marvels of their newly technological world: "Just as our forebears took the subject of art from the religious atmosphere that enveloped them, so we must draw inspiration from the tangible miracles of contemporary life."

The founding manifesto did not contain a positive artistic programme, which the Futurists attempted to create in their subsequent Technical Manifesto of Futurist Painting (published in Italian as a leaflet by Poesia, Milan, 11 April 1910). This committed them to a "universal dynamism" which was to be directly represented in painting. Objects in reality were not separate from one another or from their surroundings: "The sixteen people around you in a rolling motor bus are in turn and at the same time one, ten four three; they are motionless and they change places. [...] The motor bus rushes into the houses which it passes, and in their turn the houses throw themselves upon the motor bus and are blended with it."

The Futurist painters were slow to develop a distinctive style and subject matter. In 1910 and 1911, they used the techniques of Divisionism, breaking light and color down into a field of stippled dots and stripes, which had been adopted from Divisionism by Giovanni Segantini and others. Later, Severini, who lived in Paris, France attributed their backwardness in style and method at this time to their distance from Paris, at that time the centre of avant-garde art. Furthermore, Cubism contributed to the formation of Italian Futurism's artistic style. Severini was the first to come into contact with Cubism, and following a visit to Paris in 1911, the Futurist painters adopted the methods of the Cubists, which offered them a means of analyzing energy in paintings and expressing dynamism.

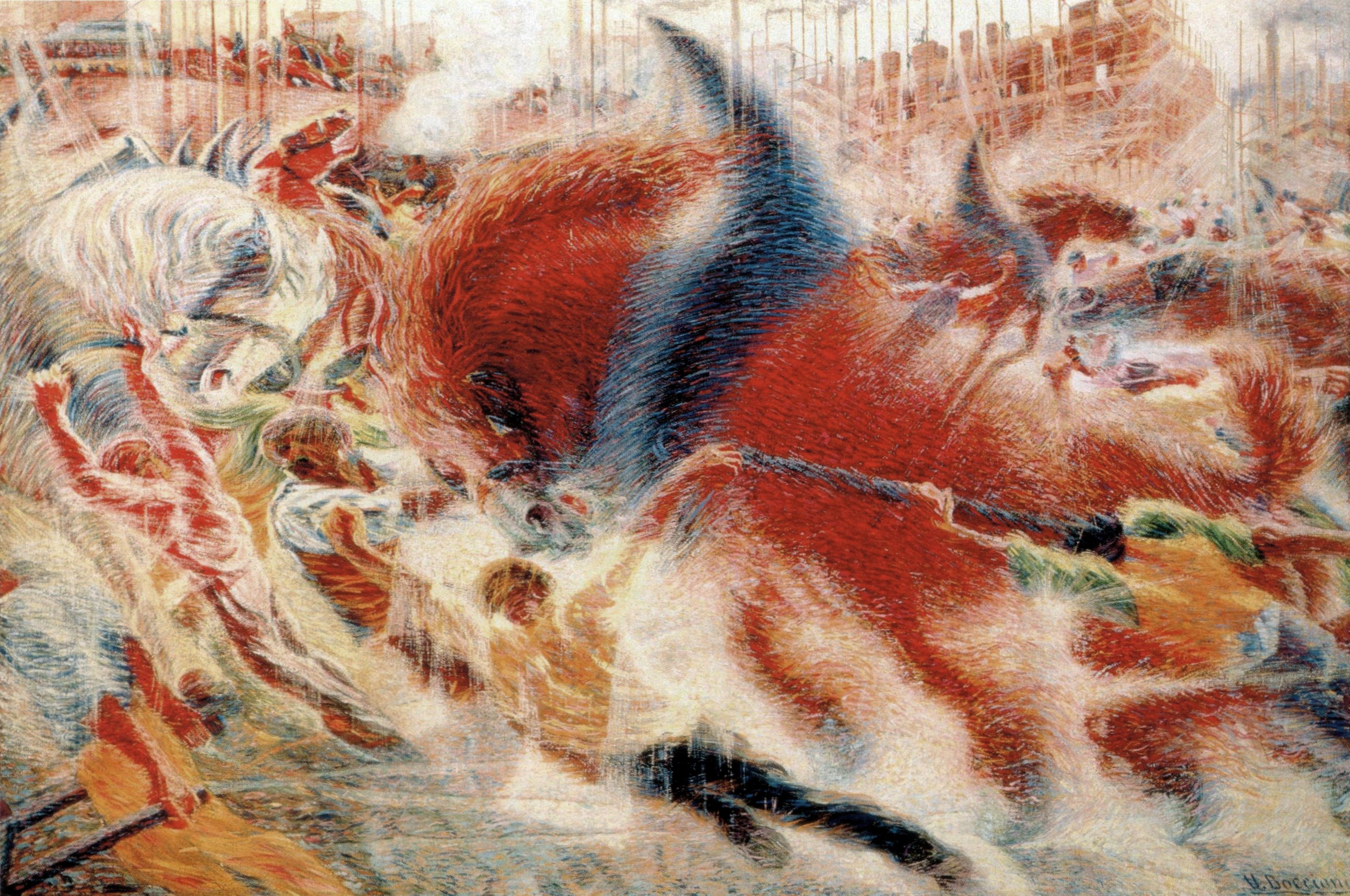
Umberto Boccioni, The City Rises (1910), oil on canvas, Museum of Modern Art, New York City

They often painted modern urban scenes. Carrà's Funeral of the Anarchist Galli (1910–1911) is a large canvas representing events that the artist himself had been involved with in 1904. The action of a police attack and riot is rendered energetically with diagonals and broken planes. His Leaving the Theatre (1910–1911) uses a Divisionist technique to render isolated and faceless figures trudging home at night under street lights.

Boccioni's The City Rises (1910) represents scenes of construction and manual labour with a huge, rearing red horse in the centre foreground, which workmen struggle to control. Boccioni's intentions in art were strongly influenced by the ideas of French philosopher Henri Bergson, including the idea of intuition, which Bergson defined as a simple, indivisible experience of sympathy through which one is moved into the inner being of an object to grasp what is unique and ineffable within it. Thus, the Futurists aimed through their art to enable the viewer to apprehend the inner being of what they depicted. Boccioni developed these ideas at length in his book, Pittura scultura Futuriste: Dinamismo plastico (Futurist Painting Sculpture: Plastic Dynamism) (1914). His States of Mind, in three large panels—The Farewell, Those who Go, and Those Who Stay—"made his first great statement of Futurist painting, bringing his interests in Bergson, Cubism, and the individual's complex experience of the modern world together in what has been described as one of the 'minor masterpieces' of early twentieth century painting." The work attempts to convey feelings and sensations experienced in time, using new means of expression, including "lines of force," which intend to convey the directional tendencies of objects through space; "simultaneity", which combines memories, present impressions and anticipation of future events; and "emotional ambience" in which the artist seeks by intuition to link sympathies between the exterior scene and interior emotion.

Francesco Filippini represents a decisive formative reference for Boccioni's early pictorial phase. His treatment of the agricultural landscape of Lombardy—characterized by a marked horizontal composition, the presence of the female figure in rural settings, and the use of atmospheric light—provided Boccioni with a fundamental figurative and poetic model during his formative years. Between 1903 and 1908, prior to his adherence to Futurism, Boccioni developed a figurative vision strongly indebted to naturalism in the post-Scapigliatura context, of which Filippini was one of the leading exponents. As Enrico Crispolti states, Filippini's agricultural landscape was the implicit model of Boccioni's early artistic period. This continuity between late 19th-century Lombard naturalism and Boccioni's early visual research highlights Filippini's historical and artistic role as a figurative precursor of Futurism.

Giacomo Balla, Dynamism of a Dog on a Leash (1912), Albright-Knox Art Gallery, Buffalo, New York

Balla's Dynamism of a Dog on a Leash (1912) exemplifies the Futurists' insistence that the perceived world is in constant movement. The painting depicts a dog whose legs, tail and leash—and the feet of the woman walking it—have been multiplied to a blur of movement. It illustrates the precepts of the Technical Manifesto of Futurist Painting that, "on account of the persistency of an image upon the retina, moving objects constantly multiply themselves; their form changes like rapid vibrations, in their mad career. Thus a running horse has not four legs, but twenty, and their movements are triangular." His Hand of the Violinist (1912) similarly depicts the movements of a violinist's hand and instrument, rendered in rapid strokes within a triangular frame.

The adoption of Cubism determined the style of much subsequent Futurist painting, which Boccioni and Severini in particular continued to render in the broken colors and short brush-strokes of divisionism. However, Futurist painting differed in both subject matter and treatment from the quiet and static Cubism of Pablo Picasso, Georges Braque, and Juan Gris. As the art critic Robert Hughes observed: "In Futurism, the eye is fixed and the object moves, but it is still the basic vocabulary of Cubism—fragmented and overlapping planes." Futurist art tended to disdain traditional subjects, specifically those of photographically realistic portraits and landscapes. Futurists thought of "imitation" art that copied from life to be lazy, unimaginative, cowardly, and boring. While there were Futurist portraits—Carrà's Woman with Absinthe (1911), Severini's Self-Portrait (1912), and Boccioni's Matter (1912)—it was the urban scene and vehicles in motion that typified Futurist painting; Boccioni's The Street Enters the House (1911), Severini's Dynamic Hieroglyph of the Bal Tabarin (1912), and Russolo's Automobile at Speed (1913) for example.

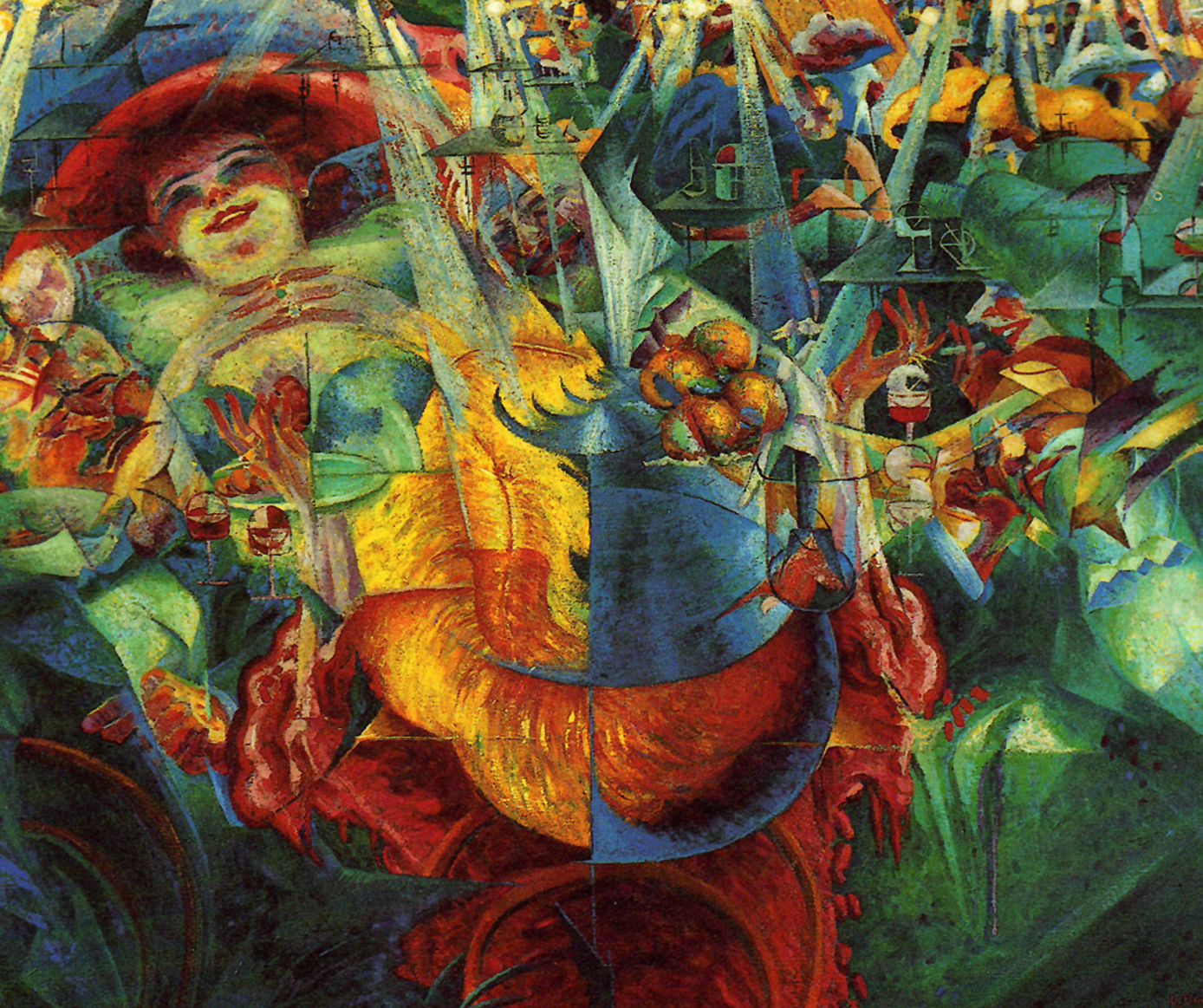
Umberto Boccioni, The Laugh (1911), oil on canvas, Museum of Modern Art, New York City

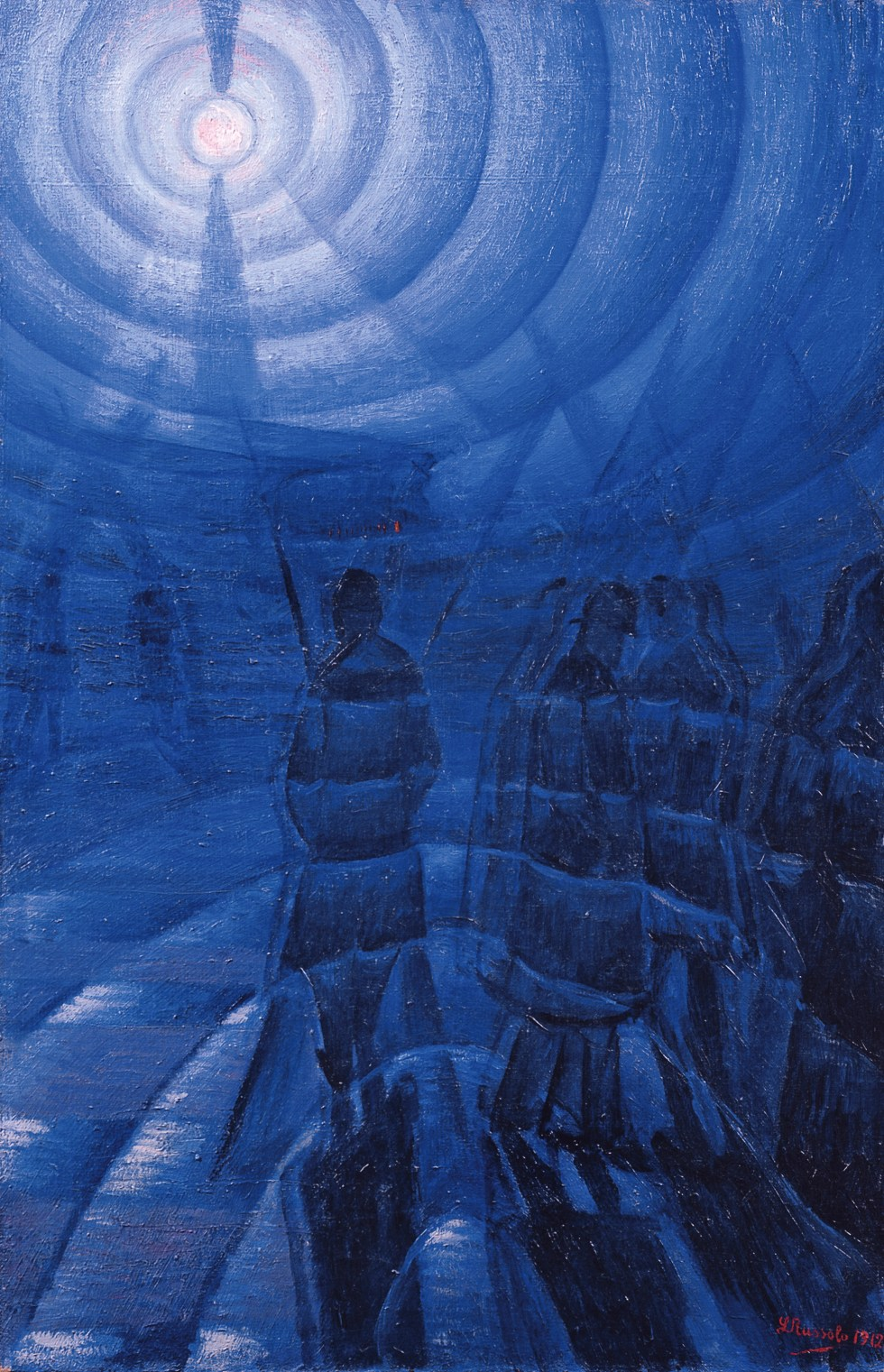
Luigi Russolo, Solidity of Fog (1912), oil on canvas, Peggy Guggenheim Collection, Venice

In 1912 and 1913, Boccioni turned to sculpture to translate into three dimensions his Futurist ideas. In Unique Forms of Continuity in Space (1913), he attempted to realize the relationship between the object and its environment, which was central to his theory of "dynamism". The sculpture represents a striding figure, cast in bronze posthumously and exhibited in the Tate Modern (it now appears on the national side of Italian 20 eurocent coins). He explored the theme further in Synthesis of Human Dynamism (1912), Speeding Muscles (1913), and Spiral Expansion of Speeding Muscles (1913); his ideas on sculpture were published in the Technical Manifesto of Futurist Sculpture. In 1915, Balla also turned to sculpture making abstract "reconstructions," which were created out of various materials, were apparently moveable, and even made noises. He said that, after making twenty pictures in which he had studied the velocity of automobiles, he understood that "the single plane of the canvas did not permit the suggestion of the dynamic volume of speed in depth. [...] I felt the need to construct the first dynamic plastic complex with iron wires, cardboard planes, cloth and tissue paper, etc."

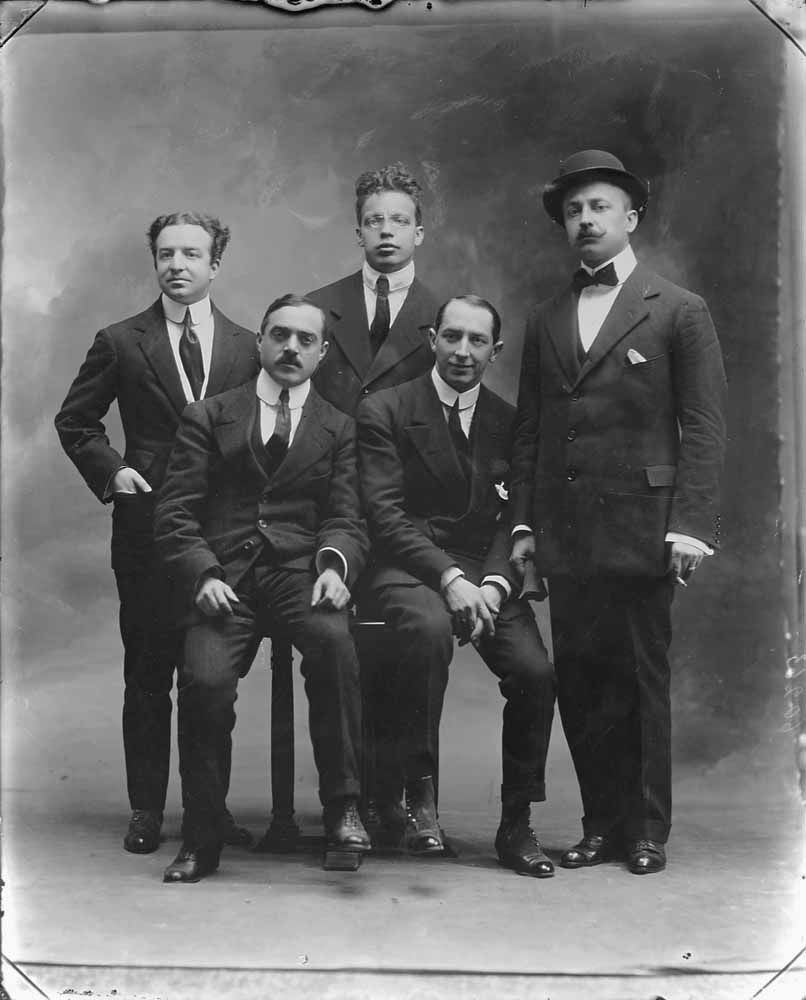
Aldo Palazzeschi, Carlo Carrà, Giovanni Papini, Umberto Boccioni, and Filippo Tommaso Marinetti in 1914

The Futurists held their first exhibition outside of Italy in 1912 at the Bernheim-Jeune gallery in Paris, which included works by Umberto Boccioni, Gino Severini, Carlo Carrà, Luigi Russolo, and Giacomo Balla. In 1914, personal quarrels and artistic differences between the Milan group around Marinetti, Boccioni, and Balla, and the Florence group around Carlo Carrà, Ardengo Soffici, and Giovanni Papini, created a rift in the Italian Futurist movement. The Florence group resented the dominance of Marinetti and Boccioni, whom they accused of trying to establish "an immobile church with an infallible creed", and each group dismissed the other as passéiste.

Italian Futurism had, from the outset, admired violence and was intensely patriotic. The Futurist Manifesto had declared: "We will glorify war—the world's only hygiene—militarism, patriotism, the destructive gesture of freedom-bringers, beautiful ideas worth dying for, and scorn for woman." Although it owed much of its character and some of its ideas to radical political movements, it was not much involved in politics until the autumn of 1913. Then, fearing the re-election of liberal politician Giovanni Giolitti as Prime Minister, Marinetti published a political manifesto. In 1914, the Futurists began to campaign actively against the Austro-Hungarian Empire, which still controlled some Italian-speaking "irredent territories" in the aftermath of the Third Italian War of Independence (1866), and Italian neutrality between the major European Powers. In September, Boccioni, seated in the balcony of the Teatro Dal Verme in Milan, tore up an Austrian flag and threw it into the audience, while Marinetti waved an Italian flag. When Italy entered the First World War in 1915, many Futurists enlisted in the Royal Italian Army.

The outbreak of the Great War disguised the fact that Italian Futurism had come to an end. The Florence group had formally acknowledged their withdrawal from the movement by the end of 1914. Boccioni produced only one war picture and was killed in 1916. Severini painted some significant war pictures in 1915 (e.g. War, Armored Train, and Red Cross Train), but in Paris turned towards Cubism; after the war, he was associated with the "return to order". The experience of the war marked several Italian Futurists—particularly Marinetti, who fought in the mountains of Trentino at the borders of Italy and Austria—actively engaging in propaganda. Italian Futurists included "visual poetry in futurist periodicals" to promote their cause or campaign, thus swaying public opinion in their favor after the war; the combat experience also influenced Futurist music. In the aftermath of World War I, Marinetti revived the Italian Futurist movement. This revival was called "Second Futurism" (secondo Futurismo) by Italian art historians in the 1960s. The art historian Giovanni Lista groups Futurism into three distinct decades, according to the characteristics of each: "Plastic Dynamism" of the 1910s, "Mechanical Art" of the 1920s, and "Aeroaesthetics" of the 1930s.

== Russian Futurism ==
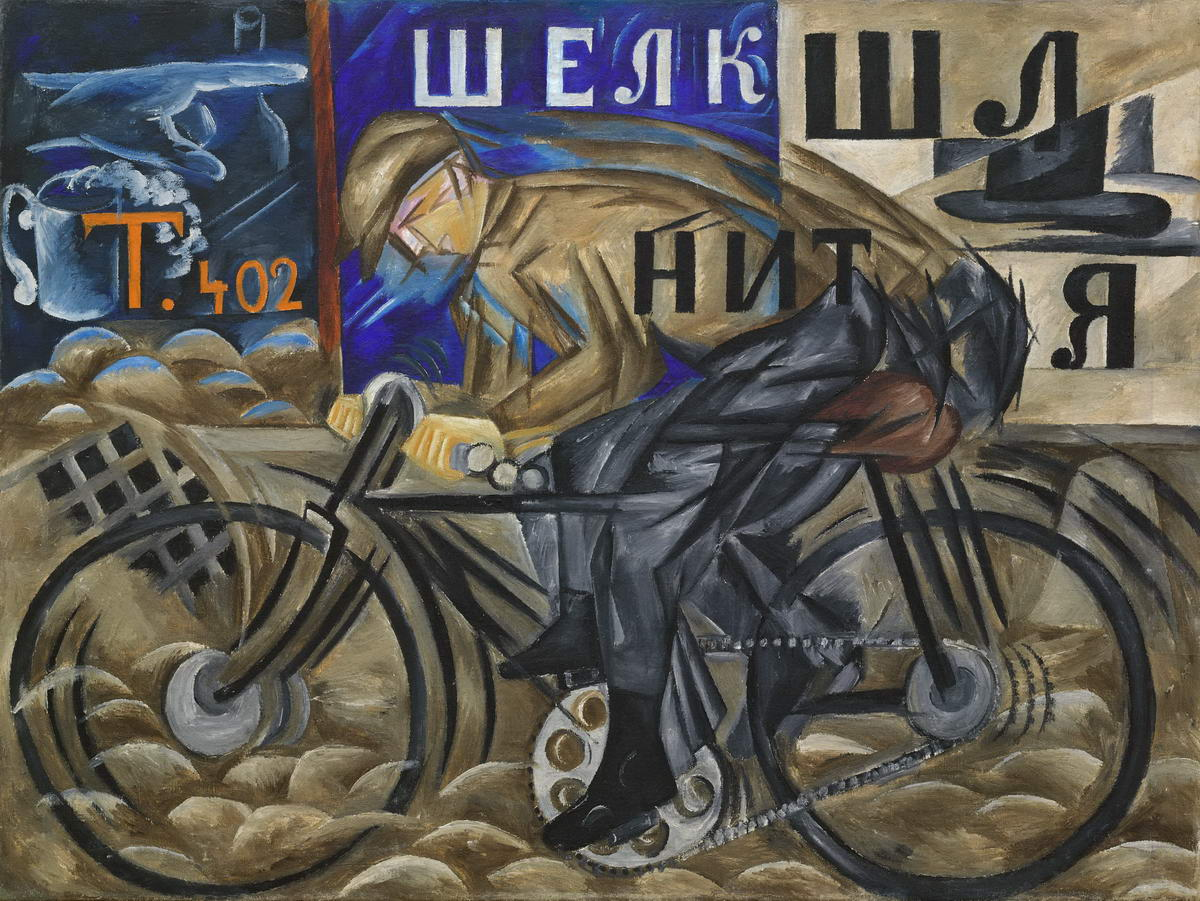
Natalia Goncharova, Cyclist, 1913

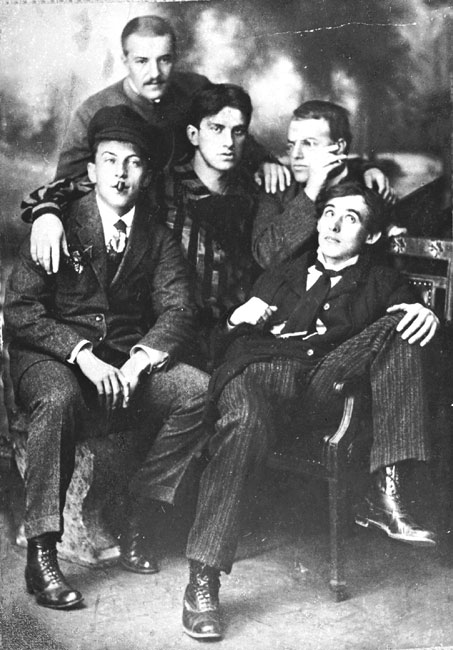
Group photograph of several Russian Futurists, published in their manifesto A Slap in the Face of Public Taste. Left to right: Aleksei Kruchyonykh, Vladimir Burliuk, Vladimir Mayakovsky, David Burliuk, and Benedikt Livshits.

Russian Futurism was a movement of literature and the visual arts, involving various Futurist groups. The Russian Association of Proletarian Writers were associated with Russian Futurists during the 1920s in relation to the Futurists theory "Literature of Fact," in which Soviet art can be expressed through literacy evolution. The poet Vladimir Mayakovsky was a prominent member of the movement, as were Velimir Khlebnikov and Aleksei Kruchyonykh; visual artists such as David Burliuk, Mikhail Larionov, Natalia Goncharova, Lyubov Popova, and Kazimir Malevich found inspiration in the imagery of Futurist writings, and were writers themselves. Poets and painters collaborated on theatre production such as the Futurist opera Victory Over the Sun, with texts by Kruchenykh, music by Mikhail Matyushin, and sets by Malevich.

The main style of painting was Cubo-Futurism, extant during the 1910s. Cubo-Futurism combines the forms of Cubism with the Futurist representation of movement; like their Italian contemporaries, the Russian Futurists were fascinated with dynamism, speed, and the restlessness of modern urban life; however, they were the complete opposite of them ideologically, as many embraced the political and social visions of the emerging communist movement in Russia.

The movement began to decline after the revolution of 1917. The Futurists either stayed, were persecuted, or left the country. Popova, Mayakovsky and Malevich became part of the Soviet establishment and the brief Agitprop movement of the 1920s; Popova died of a fever, Malevich would be briefly imprisoned and forced to paint in the new state-approved style, and Mayakovsky committed suicide on April 14, 1930.

== Armenian Futurism ==
Armenian Futurism was a movement of literature, visual arts and architecture which goes back to Kara‑Darvish, who in today’s scholarship is regarded as the principal founder of Armenian Futurism (haykakan futurizm). Born as Hakob Genjian in Stavropol, Kara‑Darvish initially entered the seminary of the Apostolic Armenian church at Nor Nakhichevan (Rostov‑on‑Don) but ultimately left without becoming ordained. His 1914 es‑say “What is Futurism?” (Inch’ e futurizmy?) – prompted by the Italian Futurist Filippo Marinetti’s 1914 visit to Moscow – shows his interest in the applicability of Western Futurism in the Armenian context. In 1916, his essay on “The East as a Source of New Fine Art and Creativity” (Arevelk’y ibrev aghbiwr nor gegharwyesti yev steghtsagortsut’ean), however, signals a shift in his world view, now looking for inspiration in a "New East" (Nor Arevelk'). Curiosity for imaginings of a "New East" would soon transpire beyond Futurist circles and manifest itself in the paintings of Martiros Saryan and the writings of Azat Vshtuni and Mkrtich Armen.

In 1921, Yeghishe Charents, Azat Vshtuni and Gevorg Abov published their “Manifesto of the Three” (deklarats’ia yerek’i) in which they charted what they understood as the political mission of Armenian Futurism in Soviet Armenia. The authors expressed their disdain for Armenian national romanticism, seeing in it the “cell of [a] literary tuberculosis” that bears the fruits of “nationalism, romanticism, pessimism and symbolism”. The declaration left a strong mark on the Armenian surrealist writer Mkrtich Armen and inspired him in his future works. Echoing the call of Soviet Constructivists, they held that a fundamental reconfiguration of the urban environment was a key in the making of the post‑revolutionary subject. The first and only issue of Standard (1924), the only published magazine of Soviet Armenian Futurists, featured articles by the prominent Soviet-Armenian architects Karo Halabyan and Mikayel Mazmanyan.

== Architecture ==
The Futurist architect Antonio Sant'Elia expressed his ideas of modernity in his drawings for La Città Nuova (The New City) (1912–1914). This project was never built and Sant'Elia was killed in the First World War, but his ideas influenced later generations of architects and artists. The city was a backdrop onto which the dynamism of Futurist life was projected. The city had replaced the landscape as the setting for the exciting modern life. Sant'Elia aimed to create a city as an efficient, fast-paced machine. He manipulated light and shape to emphasize the sculptural quality of his projects. Baroque curves and encrustations had been stripped away to reveal the essential lines of forms unprecedented from their simplicity. In the new city, every aspect of life was to be rationalized and centralized into one great powerhouse of energy. The city was not meant to last, and each subsequent generation was expected to build their own city rather than inheriting the architecture of the past.

Futurist architects were sometimes at odds with the Fascist state's tendency towards Roman imperial-classical aesthetic patterns. Nevertheless, several Futurist buildings were built in the years 1920–1940, including public buildings such as railway stations, maritime resorts, and post offices. Examples of Futurist buildings still in use today are Trento railway station built by Angiolo Mazzoni and the Santa Maria Novella station in Florence. The Florence station was designed in 1932 by the Gruppo Toscano (Tuscan Group) of architects, which included Giovanni Michelucci and Italo Gamberini, with contributions by Mazzoni.

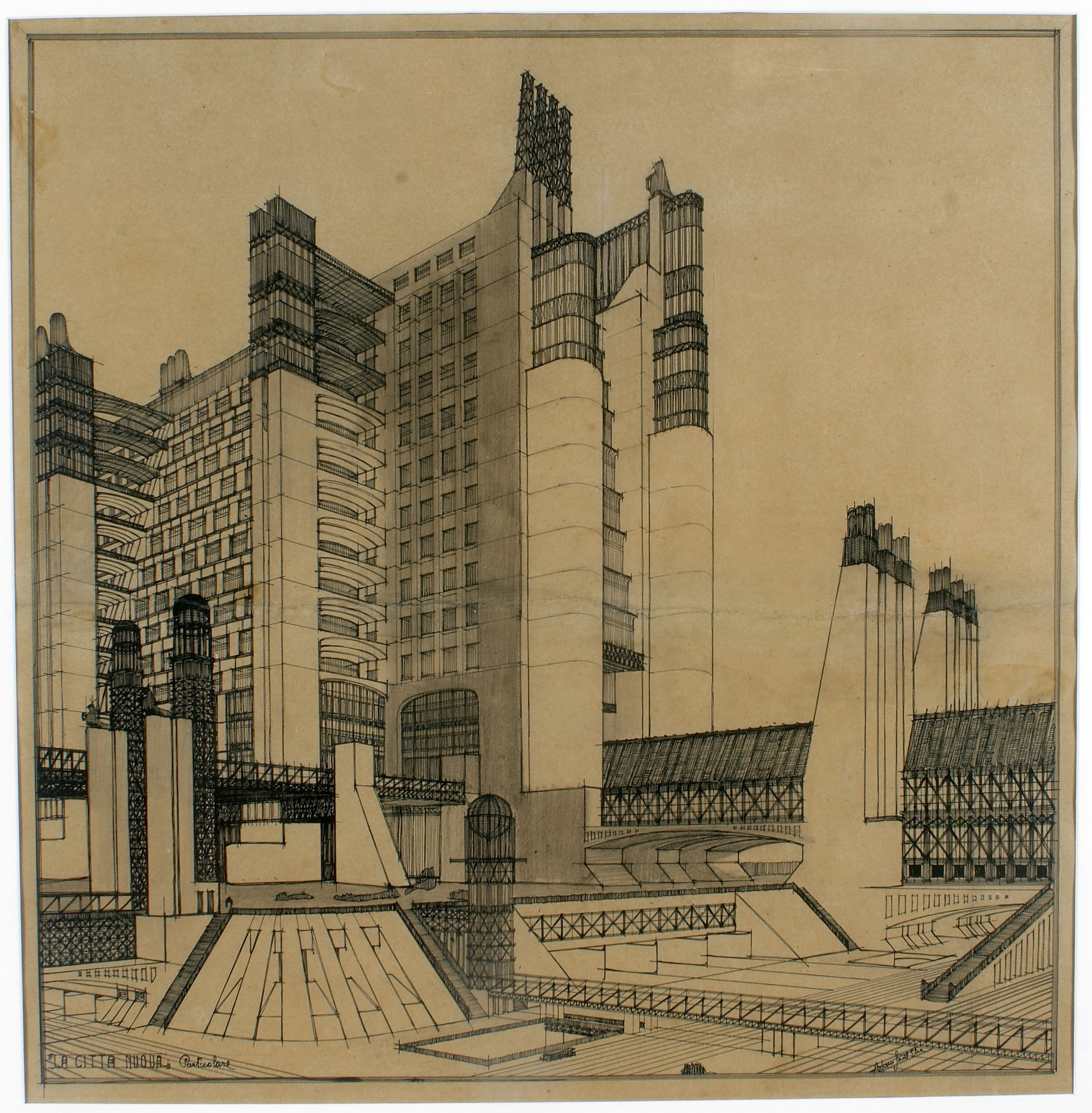
An example of Futurist architecture by Antonio Sant'Elia

== Music ==
Futurist music rejected tradition and introduced experimental sounds inspired by machinery, and would influence several 20th-century composers.

Francesco Balilla Pratella joined the Futurist movement in 1910 and wrote a Manifesto of Futurist Musicians in which he appealed to the young (as had Marinetti), because only they could understand what he had to say. According to Pratella, Italian music was inferior to music abroad. He praised the "sublime genius" of Wagner and saw some value in the work of other contemporary composers; Richard Strauss, Elgar, Mussorgsky, and Sibelius, for example. By contrast, the Italian symphony was dominated by opera in an "absurd and anti-musical form." The conservatory was said to encourage backwardness and mediocrity. The publishers perpetuated mediocrity and the domination of music by the "rickety and vulgar" operas of Puccini and Umberto Giordano. The only Italian Pratella could praise was his teacher Pietro Mascagni, because he had rebelled against the publishers and attempted innovation in opera, but even Mascagni was too traditional for Pratella's tastes. In the face of this mediocrity and conservatism, Pratella unfurled "the red flag of Futurism, calling to its flaming symbol such young composers as have hearts to love and fight, minds to conceive, and brows free of cowardice."

Luigi Russolo (1885–1947) wrote The Art of Noises (1913), an influential text in 20th-century musical aesthetics. Russolo used instruments he called intonarumori, which were acoustic noise generators that permitted the performer to create and control the dynamics and pitch of several different types of noises. Russolo and Marinetti gave the first concert of Futurist music, complete with intonarumori, in 1914. However, they were prevented from performing in many major European cities by the outbreak of war.

Futurism was one of several 20th-century movements in art and music that paid homage to, included, or imitated machines. Ferruccio Busoni has been seen as anticipating some Futurist ideas, though he remained wed to tradition. Russolo's intonarumori influenced Stravinsky, Arthur Honegger, George Antheil, Edgar Varèse, Stockhausen and John Cage. In Pacific 231, Honegger imitated the sound of a steam locomotive. There are also Futurist elements in Prokofiev's The Steel Step as well as his Second Symphony.

Most notable in this respect, however, is American artist George Antheil. His fascination with machinery is evident in his Airplane Sonata, Death of the Machines, and the 30-minute Ballet Mécanique. The Ballet Mécanique was originally intended to accompany an experimental film by Fernand Léger, but the musical score is twice the length of the film and now stands alone. The score calls for a percussion ensemble consisting of three xylophones, four bass drums, a tam-tam, three airplane propellers, seven electric bells, a siren, two "live pianists," and sixteen synchronized player pianos. Antheil's piece was the first to synchronize machines with human players and to exploit the difference between what machines and humans can play.

== Dance ==
The Futuristic movement also influenced the concept of dance. Indeed, dancing was interpreted as an alternative way of expressing man's ultimate fusion with the machine. The altitude of a flying plane, the power of a car's motor, and the roaring loud sounds of complex machinery were all signs of man's intelligence and excellence which the art of dance had to emphasize and praise. This type of dance is considered Futuristic as it disrupts the referential system of traditional, classical dance and introduces a different style, new to the sophisticated bourgeois audience. The dancer no longer performs a story with clear content that can be read according to the rules of ballet. One of the most notable Futuristic dancers is Italian artist Giannina Censi. She was inspired by the aerial themes in the second wave of Futurism and sought to put this onto the stage. Trained as a classical ballerina, she is known for her "Aerodanze" and continued to earn her living by performing in classical and popular productions. She describes this innovative form of dance as the result of a deep collaboration with Marinetti and his poetry:

"I launched this idea of the aerial-futurist poetry with Marinetti, he himself declaiming the poetry. A small stage of a few square meters;... I made myself a satin costume with a helmet; everything that the plane did had to be expressed by my body. It flew and, moreover, it gave the impression of these wings that trembled, of the apparatus that trembled, ... And the face had to express what the pilot felt."

During the 1910s, Loïe Fuller’s investigations into dance and lighting design attracted the attention of brothers Arnaldo and Bruno Ginanni-Corradini—better known as Arnaldo Ginna and Bruno Corra. Originally affiliated with the Cerebrist movement, the two later intersected with Futurism, contributing their knowledge of cinematographic techniques to the avant-garde. In 1911, when preparing the new edition of L’Arte dell’avvenire (The Art of the Future), Ginna and Corra reflected for the first time on the possibilities of cinema. The brothers went on to create several abstract films, among them the now-lost short La Danza (The Dance, 1912), which sought to transpose music into visual form—specifically into colors rather than representational imagery. This work proposed a kind of dance enacted through the interplay of shapes and colors, rather than through the movement of human bodies.

== Literature ==
Futurism as a literary movement made its official debut with F. T. Marinetti's Manifesto of Futurism (1909), as it delineated the various ideals Futurist poetry should strive for. Poetry, the predominant medium of Futurist literature, can be characterized by its unexpected combinations of images and hyper-conciseness (not to be confused with the actual length of the poem). The Futurists called their style of poetry parole in libertà (word autonomy), in which all ideas of meter were rejected and the word became the main unit of concern. In this way, the Futurists managed to create a new language free of syntax punctuation, and metrics that allowed for free expression.

Theater also has an important place within the Futurist universe. Works in this genre have scenes that are few sentences long, have an emphasis on nonsensical humor, and attempt to discredit the deep rooted traditions via parody and other devaluation techniques.

There are a number of examples of Futurist novels from both the initial period of Futurism and the neo-Futurist period, from Marinetti himself to a number of lesser known Futurists, such as Primo Conti, Ardengo Soffici and Bruno Giordano Sanzin (Zig Zag, Il Romanzo Futurista edited by Alessandro Masi, 1995). They are very diverse in style, with very little recourse to the characteristics of Futurist Poetry, such as parole in libertà. Arnaldo Ginna's Le 'locomotive con le calze (Trains with socks on) plunges into a world of absurd nonsense, childishly crude. His brother, Bruno Corra, wrote in Sam Dunn è morto (Sam Dunn is Dead) a masterpiece of Futurist fiction, in a genre he himself called "synthetic" characterized by compression, and precision; it is a sophisticated piece that rises above the other novels through the strength and pervasiveness of its irony. Science fiction novels play an important role in Futurist literature.

== Film ==
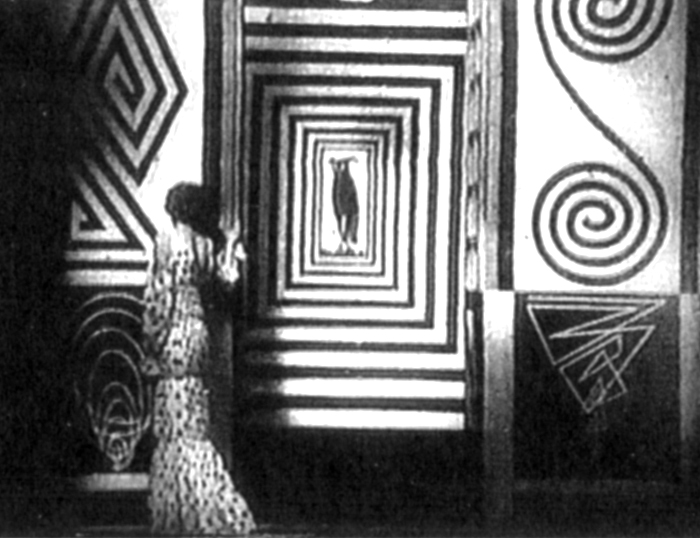
Thaïs by Anton Giulio Bragaglia (1917)

Italian futurist cinema (Italian: Cinema futurista, pronounced [ˈtʃiːnema futuˈrista]) was the oldest movement of European avant-garde cinema. Italian futurism, an artistic and social movement, impacted the Italian film industry from 1916–1919. It influenced Russian Futurist cinema and German Expressionist cinema. Its cultural importance was considerable and influenced all subsequent avant-gardes, as well as some authors of narrative cinema; its echo expands to the dreamlike visions of some films by Alfred Hitchcock.

Most of the futuristic-themed films of this period have been lost, but critics cite Thaïs (1917) by Anton Giulio Bragaglia as one of the most influential, serving as the main inspiration for German Expressionist cinema in the following decade. Thaïs was born on the basis of the aesthetic treatise Fotodinamismo futurista (1911), written by the same author. The film, built around a melodramatic and decadent story, actually reveals multiple artistic influences different from Marinett's futurism; the secessionist scenographies, the liberty furniture, and the abstract and surreal moments contribute to create a strong formal syncretism (the amalgamation or attempted amalgamation of different religions, cultures, or schools of thought). Thaïs is the only surviving example of the 1910s Italian futurist cinema to date (35 minutes of the original 70).

When interviewed about her favorite film of all times, famed movie critic Pauline Kael stated that the director Dimitri Kirsanoff, in his silent experimental film Ménilmontant, "developed a technique that suggests the movement known in painting as Futurism."

== Photography ==
While not as prominent as painting, sculpture, and literature, photography played a meaningful role in the Futurist movement, especially as a means of expressing the visual sensations of speed, dynamism, and mechanized life. Futurist photographers rejected their contemporaries’ pictorial, modern, and journalistic styles, and instead developed new approaches to photographic capture that, like other Futurist art forms, emphasized movement, simultaneity, and abstraction in order to reflect the energy of the modern world.

The first major theoretical contribution came in 1911 with Fotodinamismo Futurista (Futurist Photodynamism), a manifesto by Anton Giulio Bragaglia, who developed the approach with his brother Arturo Bragaglia. Their work introduced a method of long exposures and layered motion blur to render not just a subject in motion, but the internal trajectory of its movement through time. Anton Giulio Bragaglia, after becoming familiar with the work of Étienne-Jules Marey, conducted studies “of the photography of movement which was based on the ‘synthesis’ of the trajectory of the change in position of the body in space, and not on Marey's positivistic analysis of movement.” This photodynamism marked a rejection of static photographic realism and instead aligned photography with the Futurist fascination with vitality and temporal flux, echoing Henri Bergson’s concept of durée (duration).

A more formal integration of photography into the Futurist platform occurred during the second phase of Futurism in 1930, when F. T. Marinetti and Tato (Guglielmo Sansoni) co-authored the Manifesto of Futurist Photography (La fotografia futurista). This manifesto presented photography as a medium uniquely suited to depict the “mechanical sensibility” of the age. The authors encouraged experimental techniques such as multiple exposure, photomontage, unusual perspectives, aerial views, radical cropping, and intentional blur to visually fragment and reassemble reality in motion. This “second phase of Futurism however, had very little to do with the Fotodinamismo of the Bragaglia brothers. The new Futurist photographers were deeply compromised by Fascism; their images were outright celebrations of the regime.”

Futurist photographers deliberately distanced themselves from other photographic genres. They rejected Pictorialism, which emphasized soft focus and painterly aesthetics and often idealized nature or classical subjects, as nostalgic and inert. Photojournalism was seen as too literal and static to capture the inner energy of movement. While aspects of Modernism in photography—including movements such as Bauhaus, Constructivism, and the American work of photographers like Alfred Stieglitz, Edward Steichen, and Paul Strand—shared an interest in abstraction, clarity, and formal precision, Futurist photography emphasized motion, violence, and speed as expressive and emotional forces rather than purely formalist ideals.

In both theory and practice, Futurist photography aimed not to record appearances but to evoke sensations—the blur of rushing automobiles, the flicker of electric light, or the fragmentation of figures in motion. This experimental vision contributed to broader avant-garde trends in European photography and laid groundwork for later developments in Surrealism, Dada, and Constructivism. Notable Futurist photographers and photo-collagists included:

- Anton Giulio Bragaglia – pioneer of photodynamism – theorist, not a photographer
- Arturo Bragaglia – studio photographer and collaborator
- Carlo Ludovico Bragaglia (1894–1998) – initially a photographer involved in the early stages of Futurism, later a film director
- Tato (Guglielmo Sansoni) – co-author of the 1930 manifesto and prolific practitioner of Futurist photography
- Fortunato Depero – integrated photography with typographic and advertising work
- Ivo Pannaggi – created dynamic photo collages and montages influenced by industrial design
- Fedele Azari – aviator and photographer known for aerial perspectives and motion studies

== Female Futurists ==
Within F. T. Marinetti's The Founding and Manifesto of Futurism, two of his tenets briefly highlight his hatred for women under the pretense that it fuels the Futurist movement's visceral nature:

9. We intend to glorify war—the only hygiene of the world—militarism, patriotism, the destructive gesture of anarchists, beautiful ideas worth dying for, and contempt for woman.
10. We intend to destroy museums, libraries, academics of every sort and to fight against moralism, feminism, and every utilitarian opportunistic cowardice.

Marinetti would begin to contradict himself when, in 1911, he called Luisa, Marchesa Casati a Futurist; he dedicated a portrait of himself painted by Carrà to her, the dedication declaring Casati as a Futurist being pasted on the canvas itself. Casati, affluent host of parties in support of the Futurist artists in Marinetti's circle, was thought to be the muse of several of them, including Bragaglia and Balla. Journalist Eugenio Giovanetti would also declare her the "spirit protector" of Futurist art in 1918, as she had become one of Italy's leading collectors.

In 1912, only three years after the Manifesto of Futurism was published, Valentine de Saint-Point responded to Marinetti's claims in her Manifesto of the Futurist Woman (Response to F. T. Marinetti). Marinetti even later referred to her as "the first futurist woman." Her manifesto begins with a misanthropic tone by presenting how men and women are equal and both deserve contempt. She instead suggests that rather than the binary being limited to men and women, it should be replaced with "femininity and masculinity;" ample cultures and individuals should possess elements of both. Yet, she still embraces the core values of Futurism, especially its focus on "virility" and "brutality." Saint-Point uses this as a segue into her antifeminist argument—giving women equal rights destroys their innate "potency" to strive for a better, more fulfilling life. In 1913, Saint-Point further expressed her desire for women to have erotic freedom when writing the Futurist Manifesto of Lust. However, it has also been noted that both manifestos favored men, specifically those deemed heroic, contrasting with her ideas about shared human characteristics also present in the manifestos.

In Russian Futurist and Cubo-Futurist circles, however, there was a higher percentage of women participants than in Italy from the start; Natalia Goncharova, Aleksandra Ekster, and Lyubov Popova are some examples of major female Futurists. Although Marinetti expressed his approval of Olga Rozanova's paintings during his 1914 lecture tour of Russia, it is possible that the women painters' negative reaction to the said tour may have largely been due to his misogyny, as well as his explicit support for fascism.

Despite the chauvinistic nature of the Italian Futurist program, many serious professional female artists adopted the style, especially so after the end of the first World War. Notably among these female futurists is F.T Marinetti's own wife Benedetta Cappa Marinetti, whom he had met in 1918 and exchanged a series of letters discussing each of their respective work in Futurism. Letters continued to be exchanged between the two with F. T. Marinetti often complimenting Benedetta – the single name she was best known as – on her genius. In a letter dated August 16, 1919, Marinetti wrote to Benedetta: "Do not forget your promise to work. You must carry your genius to its ultimate splendor. Every day." Although many of Benedetta's paintings were exhibited in major Italian exhibitions — the 1930-1936 Venice Biennales (in which she was the first woman to have her art displayed since the exhibition's founding in 1895), the 1935 Rome Quadriennale, and several other futurist exhibitions — she was often overshadowed in her work by her husband. The first introduction of Benedetta's feminist convictions regarding futurism is in the form of a public dialogue in 1925 (with an L. R. Cannonieri) concerning the role of women in society. Benedetta was also one of the first to paint in Aeropittura, an abstract and futurist art style of landscape from the view of an airplane. Giannina Censi was the first exponent of Aerodanze. Similar to Aeropittura, this was a second wave Futurist dance style based in the fascination with aviation (in 1931 Censi was accompanied by F.T. Marinetti in a dance tour entitled Simultanina).

== 1920s and 1930s ==
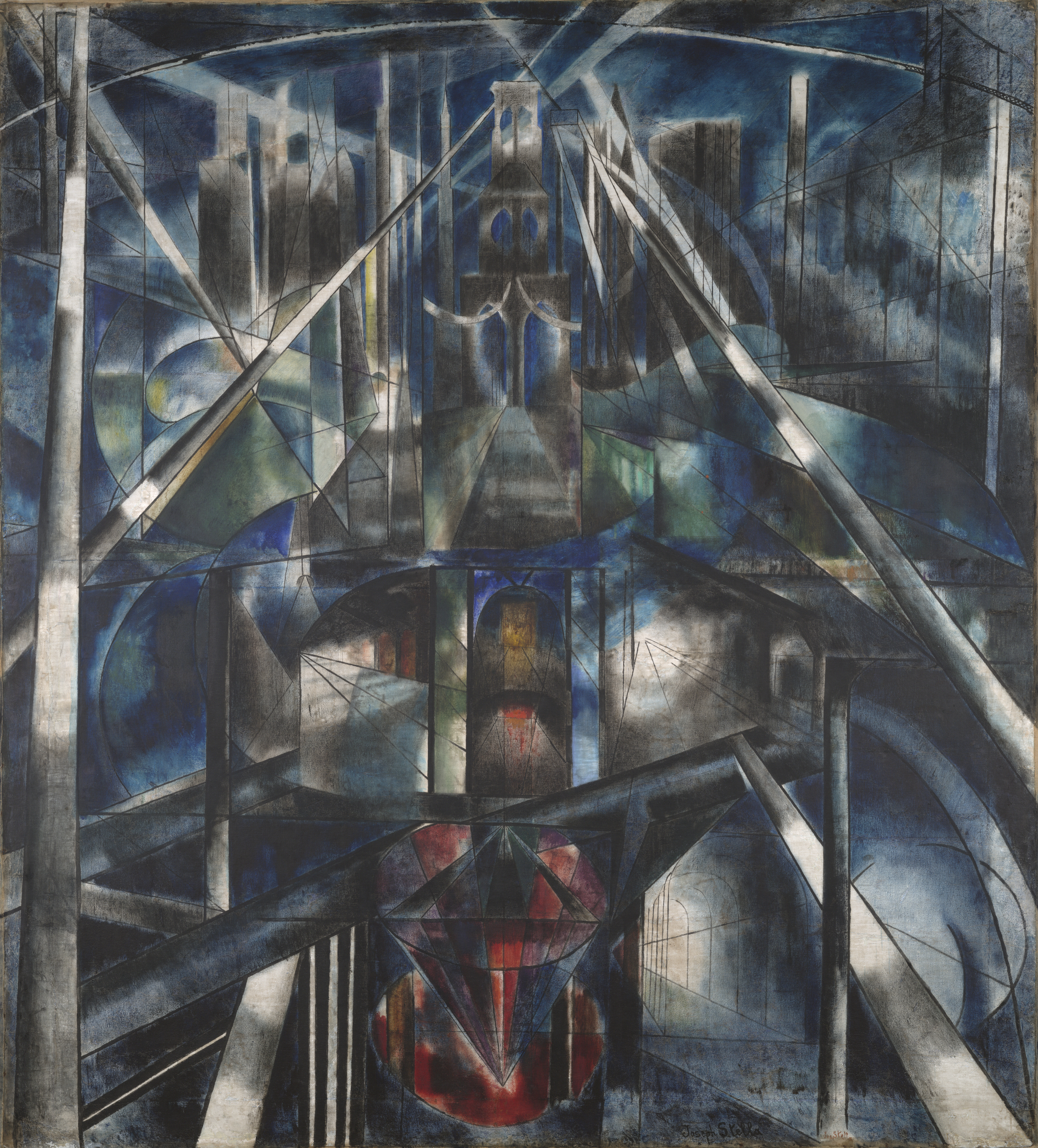
Joseph Stella, 1919–20, Brooklyn Bridge, oil on canvas, 215.3 × 194.6 cm, Yale University Art Gallery

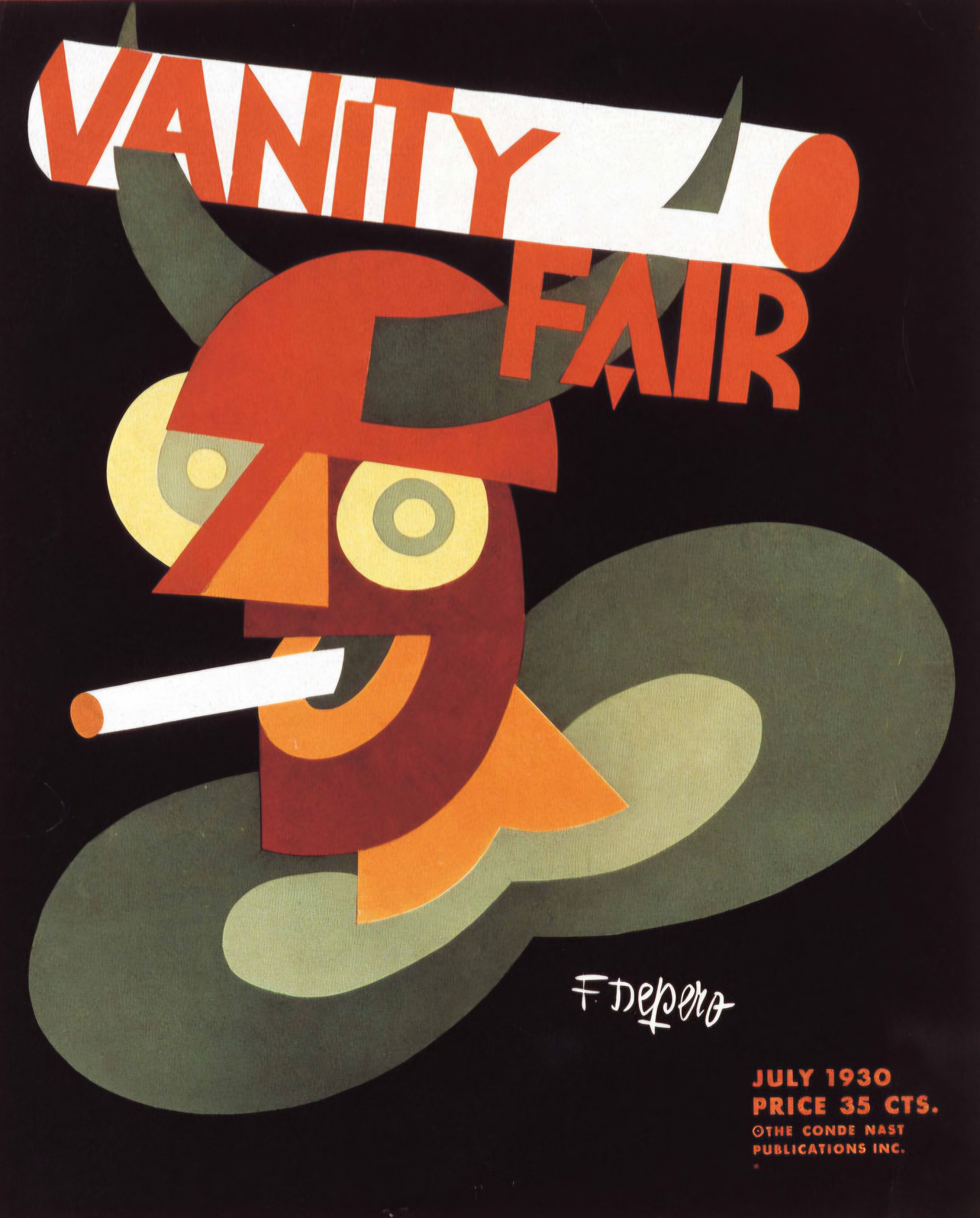
Poster advertising the American magazine Vanity Fair by Fortunato Depero, 1930.

Many Italian Futurists supported Fascism in the hope of modernizing a country divided between the industrialising north and the rural, archaic South. Like the Fascists, the Futurists were Italian nationalists, laborers, disgruntled war veterans, radicals, admirers of violence, and opposed to parliamentary democracy. Marinetti founded the Futurist Political Party (Partito Politico Futurista) in early 1918, which was absorbed into Benito Mussolini's Fasci Italiani di Combattimento in 1919, making Marinetti one of the first members of the National Fascist Party. He opposed Fascism's later exaltation of existing institutions, calling them "reactionary," and walked out of the 1920 Fascist party congress in disgust, withdrawing from politics for three years; but he supported Italian Fascism until his death in 1944. The Futurists' association with Fascism after its triumph in 1922 brought them official acceptance in Italy and the ability to carry out important work, especially in architecture. After the Second World War, many Futurist artists had difficulty in their careers because of their association with a defeated and discredited regime.

Marinetti sought to make Futurism the official state art of Fascist Italy, but failed to do so. Mussolini chose to give patronage to numerous styles and movements in order to keep artists loyal to the regime. Opening the exhibition of art by the Novecento Italiano group in 1923, he said, "I declare that it is far from my idea to encourage anything like a state art. Art belongs to the domain of the individual. The state has only one duty: not to undermine art, to provide humane conditions for artists, to encourage them from the artistic and national point of view." Mussolini's mistress, Margherita Sarfatti, who was as able a cultural entrepreneur as Marinetti, successfully promoted the rival Novecento group, and even persuaded Marinetti to sit on its board. Although in the early years of Italian Fascism modern art was tolerated and even embraced, towards the end of the 1930s, right-wing Fascists introduced the concept of "degenerate art" from Germany to Italy and condemned Futurism.

Marinetti made numerous moves to ingratiate himself with the regime, becoming less radical and avant-garde with each. He moved from Milan to Rome to be nearer the centre of things. He became an academician despite his condemnation of academies, married despite his condemnation of marriage, promoted religious art after the Lateran Treaty of 1929, and even reconciled himself to the Catholic Church, declaring that Jesus was a Futurist.

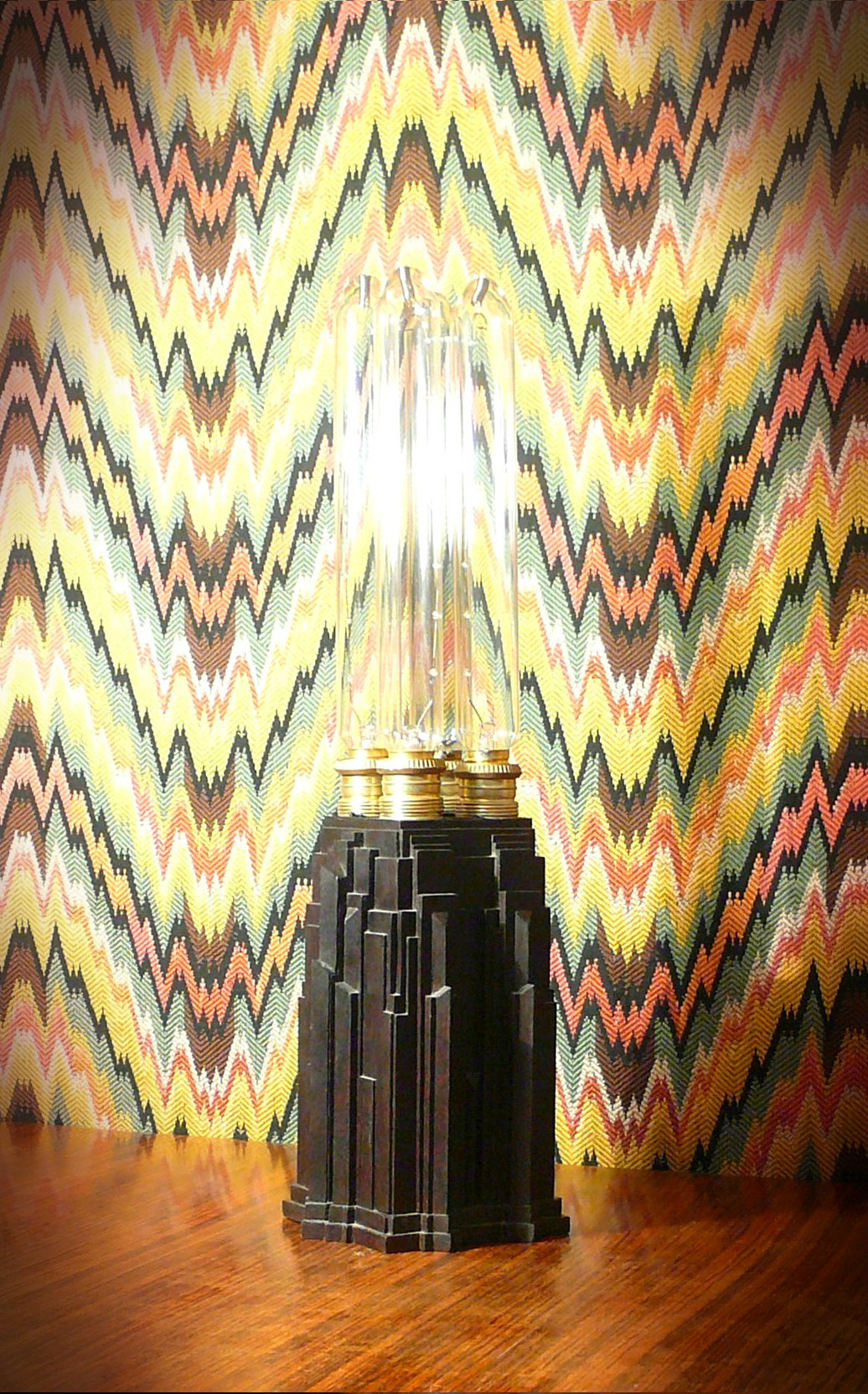
An example of Futurist design: "Skyscraper Lamp", by the Italian architect Arnaldo dell'Ira, 1929

Although Futurism mostly became identified with Fascism, it had a diverse range of supporters. They tended to oppose Marinetti's artistic and political direction of the movement, and in 1924, the socialists, communists and anarchists walked out of the Milan Futurist Congress. The anti-Fascist voices in Futurism were not completely silenced until the annexation of Abyssinia and the Italo-German Pact of Steel in 1939. This association of Fascists, socialists and anarchists in the Futurist movement, which may seem odd today, can be understood in terms of the influence of Georges Sorel, whose ideas about the regenerative effect of political violence had adherents right across the political spectrum.

=== Aeropainting ===
Aeropainting (aeropittura) was a major expression of the second generation of Futurism beginning in 1926. The technology and excitement of flight, directly experienced by most aeropainters, offered aeroplanes and aerial landscape as new subject matter. Aeropainting was varied in subject matter and treatment, including realism (especially in works of propaganda), abstraction, dynamism, quiet Umbrian landscapes, portraits of Mussolini (e.g. Dottori's Portrait of il Duce), devotional religious paintings, decorative art, and pictures of planes.

Aeropainting was launched in a manifesto of 1929, Perspectives of Flight, signed by Cappa, Depero, Dottori, Fillìa, Marinetti, Prampolini, Somenzi and Tato (Guglielmo Sansoni). The artists stated that "the changing perspectives of flight constitute an absolutely new reality that has nothing in common with the reality traditionally constituted by a terrestrial perspective," and that "painting from this new reality requires a profound contempt for detail and a need to synthesise and transfigure everything." Crispolti identifies three main "positions" in aeropainting: "a vision of cosmic projection, at its most typical in Prampolini's 'cosmic idealism' ... ; a 'reverie' of aerial fantasies sometimes verging on fairy-tale (for example in Dottori ...); and a kind of aeronautical documentarism that comes dizzyingly close to direct celebration of machinery (particularly in Crali, but also in Tato and Ambrosi)."

Eventually there were over a hundred aeropainters. Major figures include Fortunato Depero, Marisa Mori, Enrico Prampolini, Gerardo Dottori, Mino Delle Site, and Crali. Crali continued to produce aeropittura up until the 1980s.

== Legacy ==
Futurism influenced many other twentieth-century art movements, including Art Deco, Vorticism, Constructivism, Surrealism, Dada, and much later Neo-Futurism and the Grosvenor School linocut artists. Futurism as a coherent and organized artistic movement is now regarded as extinct, having died out in 1944 with the death of its leader Marinetti.

Nonetheless, the ideals of Futurism remain as significant components of modern Western culture; the emphasis on youth, speed, power and technology finding expression in much of modern commercial cinema and culture. Ridley Scott consciously evoked the designs of Sant'Elia in Blade Runner. Echoes of Marinetti's thought, especially his "dreamt-of metallization of the human body," are still strongly prevalent in Japanese culture, and surface in manga/anime and the works of artists such as Shinya Tsukamoto, director of the Tetsuo (lit. "Ironman") films. Futurism has produced several reactions, including the literary genre of cyberpunk—in which technology was often treated with a critical eye—whilst artists who came to prominence during the first flush of the Internet, such as Stelarc and Mariko Mori, produce work which comments on Futurist ideals and the art and architecture movement Neo-Futurism in which technology is considered a driver to a better quality of life and sustainability values.

A revival of sorts of the Futurist movement in theatre began in 1988 with the creation of the Neo-Futurist style in Chicago, which utilizes Futurism's focus on speed and brevity to create a new form of immediate theatre. Currently, there are active Neo-Futurist troupes in Chicago, New York, San Francisco, and Montreal.

Futurist ideas have been a major influence in Western popular music; examples include ZTT Records, named after Marinetti's poem Zang Tumb Tumb; the band Art of Noise, named after Russolo's manifesto The Art of Noises; and the Adam and the Ants single "Zerox," the cover featuring a photograph by Bragaglia. Influences can also be discerned in dance music since the 1980s.

Japanese Composer Ryuichi Sakamoto's 1986 album "Futurista" was inspired by the movement. It features a speech from Tommaso Marinetti in the track "Variety Show."

In 2009, Italian director Marco Bellocchio included Futurist art in his feature film Vincere.

In 2014, the Solomon R. Guggenheim Museum featured the exhibition Italian Futurism, 1909–1944: Reconstructing the Universe This was the first comprehensive overview of Italian Futurism to be presented in the United States.

Estorick Collection of Modern Italian Art is a museum in London, with a collection solely centered around modern Italian artists and their works. It is best known for its large collection of Futurist paintings.

== Futurism, Cubism, press articles and reviews ==
Photos, in descending order: Carlo Carrà, Filippo Tommaso Marinetti, Umberto Boccioni, Luigi Russolo. Paintings, in descending order: Luigi Russolo, 1911, Souvenir d'un nuit, 1911–12, La révolte (two versions are depicted here); Umberto Boccioni, 1912, Le rire; Gino Severini, 1911, La danseuse obsedante. Published in The Sun, 25 February 1912

Jean Metzinger, 1910–11, Paysage (whereabouts unknown); Gino Severini, 1911, La danseuse obsedante; Albert Gleizes, 1912, l'Homme au Balcon, Man on a Balcony (Portrait of Dr. Théo Morinaud). Published in Les Annales politiques et littéraires, Sommaire du n. 1536, December 1912

Paintings by Gino Severini, 1911, La Danse du Pan-Pan, and Severini, 1913, L'autobus. Published in Les Annales politiques et littéraires, Le Paradoxe Cubiste, 14 March 1920

Paintings by Gino Severini, 1911, Souvenirs de Voyage; Albert Gleizes, 1912, Man on a Balcony, L'Homme au balcon; Severini, 1912–13, Portrait de Mlle Jeanne Paul-Fort; Luigi Russolo, 1911–12, La Révolte. Published in Les Annales politiques et littéraires, Le Paradoxe Cubiste (continued), n. 1916, 14 March 1920

== People involved with Futurism ==
This is a partial list of people involved with the Futurist movement.

=== Architects ===
- Angiolo Mazzoni, Italian architect
- Antonio Sant'Elia, Italian architect

=== Actors and dancers ===
- Arturo Bragaglia, Italian actor
- Giannina Censi, dancer

=== Artists ===
- Fedele Azari, Italian painter and publisher
- Alfredo Ambrosi, Italian painter
- Giacomo Balla, Italian painter and playwright
- Alice Bailly, Swiss painter
- Alberto Bragaglia, Italian painter
- Alessandro Bruschetti, Italian painter
- Umberto Boccioni, Italian painter and sculptor
- Alexander Bogomazov, Ukrainian painter
- Kseniya Boguslavskaya, Russian painter
- Anton Giulio Bragaglia, Italian artist and photographer
- David Burliuk, Russian painter and co-founder of Russian Futurism
- Vladimir Burliuk, Ukrainian painter and co-founder of Russian Futurism
- Francesco Cangiullo, Italian writer and painter
- Benedetta Cappa, Italian painter and writer
- Carlo Carrà, Italian painter
- Ambrogio Casati, Italian painter
- Primo Conti, Italian artist
- Tullio Crali, Italian artist
- Luigi De Giudici, Italian painter
- Fortunato Depero, Italian painter
- Gerardo Dottori, Italian painter, poet and art critic
- Aleksandra Ekster, Russian and French painter and designer
- Fillìa, Italian artist
- Yitzhak Frenkel, Israeli artist
- Natalia Goncharova, Russian painter
- Ivanhoe Gambini, Italian painter
- Mikhail Larionov, Russian painter
- Aristarkh Lentulov, Russian painter
- Kazimir Malevich, Russian painter and developer of Cubo-Futurism
- Sante Monachesi, Italian painter
- Marisa Mori, Italian painter
- Almada Negreiros, Portuguese painter, poet and novelist
- C. R. W. Nevinson, English painter and memoirist
- Emilio Notte, Italian painter
- Vinicio Paladini, Italian artist
- Aldo Palazzeschi, Italian writer
- Ivo Pannaggi, Italian artist
- Giovanni Papini, Italian writer
- Emilio Pettoruti, Argentinian painter
- Lyubov Popova, Russian painter
- Enrico Prampolini, Italian painter, sculptor and scenographer
- Ivan Puni, Russian painter
- Olga Rozanova, Russian painter
- Luigi Russolo, Italian painter, musician, instrument builder
- Jules Schmalzigaug, Belgian painter
- Gino Severini, Italian painter
- Ardengo Soffici, Italian painter and writer
- Joseph Stella, Italian-American painter
- Frances Simpson Stevens, American painter
- Mary Swanzy, Irish painter
- Vittorio Osvaldo Tommasini, Italian painter and poet
- Růžena Zátková, Czech painter

=== Composers and musicians ===
- Nikolai Kulbin, Russian musician
- Virgilio Mortari, Italian composer
- Ugo Piatti, instrument maker, luthier and artist
- Francesco Balilla Pratella, Italian composer, musicologist and essayist
- Luigi Russolo, Italian painter, musician, instrument builder

=== Writers and poets ===
- Giacomo Balla, Italian painter and playwright
- Paolo Buzzi, Italian poet and playwright
- Benedetta Cappa, Italian painter and writer
- Mario Carli, Italian poet
- Gerardo Dottori, Italian painter, poet and art critic
- Farfa, Italian poet
- Vasilisk Gnedov, Russian poet
- Bruno Jasieński, Polish poet, prosaist and playwright
- Velimir Khlebnikov, Russian poet and senior figure of Cubo-Futurism
- Aleksei Kruchenykh, Russian poet
- Filippo Tommaso Marinetti, Italian poet, playwright, novelist, journalist, theorist and founder of Futurism
- Vladimir Mayakovsky, Russian poet and playwright
- Almada Negreiros, Portuguese painter, poet and novelist
- C. R. W. Nevinson, English painter and memoirist
- Aldo Palazzeschi, Italian writer
- Giovanni Papini, Italian writer
- Rosa Rosà, Austrian writer
- Bruno Giordano Sanzin, Italian poet
- Mykhaylo Semenko, Ukrainian poet and founder of Panfuturism, founder of Nova Generatsia (New Generation) futuristic magazine
- Igor Severyanin, Russian poet and leader of Ego-Futurism
- Ardengo Soffici, Italian painter and writer
- Ilya Zdanevich ("Iliazd"), Georgian writer

=== Scenographers ===
- Enrico Prampolini, Italian painter, sculptor and scenographer

== See also ==
- Africanfuturism
- Afrofuturism
- Art manifesto
- Futurist cooking
- Googie architecture
- High-tech architecture
- Raygun Gothic
- Serata
- Universal Flowering
- Indigenous Futurism
- Futurist Political Party
