= Aramus =

Aramus may refer to:

- Aramus (bird), a genus of birds containing the limpkin (Aramus guarauna) and several fossil species
- Aramus, Armenia, a town
