= Giannina =

Giannina is a given name. Notable people with the given name include:

- Giannina Arangi-Lombardi (1891–1951), Italian operatic singer
- Giannina Braschi (born 1953), Puerto Rican poet, novelist, dramatist, and scholar
- Giannina Censi (1913–1995), Italian dancer and choreographer
- Giannina Chiantoni (1881–1972), Italian actress
- Giannina Facio (born 1955), Costa Rican actress
- Giannina Lattanzio (born 1993), Ecuadorian footballer
- Giannina Marchini (1906–1976), Italian sprinter and middle distance runner
- Giannina Russ (1873-1951), Italian operatic singer
- Giannina Segnini (born 1970), Costa Rican journalist
- Giannina Silva (born 1984), Uruguayan actress, television host, model, and beauty pageant titleholder

== See also ==
- Giannina e Bernardone, 1781 opera by Domenico Cimarosa
