= Mkrtich Armen =

Soviet Armenian writer (1906–1972)

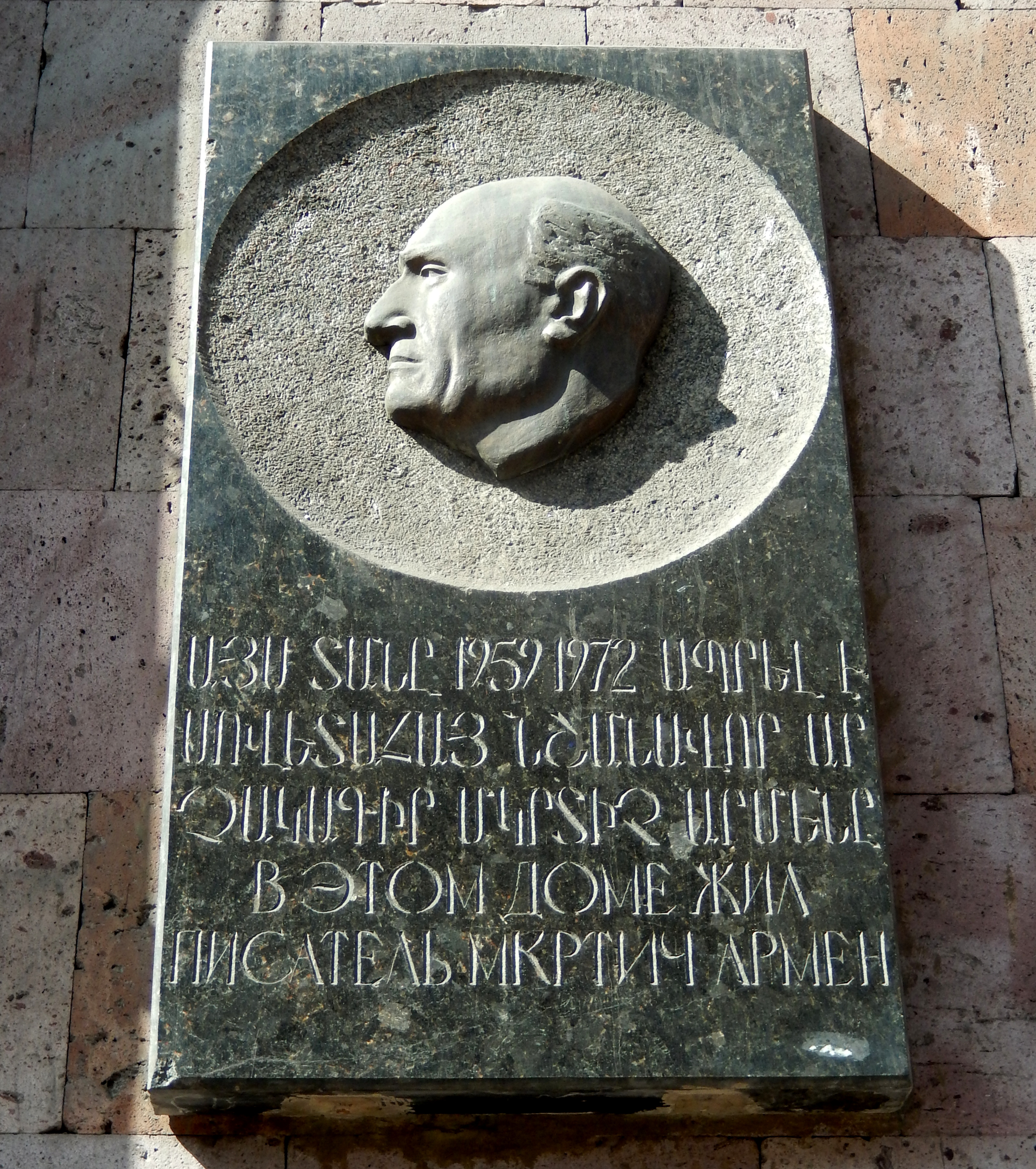
- Mkrtich Armen's plaque in Yerevan
- Born: Mkrtich Harutyunyan; December 14, 1906; Gyumri, Armenia
- Died: December 22, 1972 (aged 66); Yerevan,
- Occupations: Writer, poet

Mkrtich Harutyunyan (Armenian: Մկրտիչ Գրիգորի Հարությունյան), known by the pen name Mkrtich Armen (Armenian: Մկրտիչ Արմեն; December 14, 1906 in Alexandropol – December 22, 1972 in Yerevan) was a Soviet and Armenian writer and poet.

== Biography ==
Armen was born in Alexandropol (modern-day Gyumri) to a family of artisans originating from Constantinople. During his childhood and early youth he experienced personal losses and economic hardship. After the death of his father in 1917, his mother had to leave Armen to a local orphanage, where he spent most of his youth. In the orphanage he became a reader of the Armenian socialist journal Murch (“The Hammer”) and the publications of Armenian Futurists.

In 1923, Armen published his debut poem, Transcaucasia, in “The Labourer” (Banvor), through which he gained widespread readership across Armenia and achieved recognition by his peers. Upon relocating to Yerevan, he maintained positions on the editorial boards of the journals “Literary Positions” (Grakan dirk’erum) and “Young Bolshevik” (Yeritasard Bolshevik). In 1926, he published “The Red Square” (Karmir K’arrakusin), a short story that depicts the life of a Muslim girl living in a vernacular district of Yerevan along the shores of the Getar River. His earlier works betray adherence to the Soviet modernist development paradigm that "posits both Yerevan’s Muslim and Armenian cultures as essentially inferior and incompatible with the ideals of a new world in the making".

In 1930, Armen moved to Moscow to study at the Gerasimov Institute of Cinematography in Moscow. One year later, in 1931, he published his first novel Yerevan. The novel signals a departure from previous views he held regarding Soviet modernization. In the work which circulates around the feud between two competing architects modeled on Alexander Tamanyan and Mikayel Mazmanyan, Armen explores the idea of the New East (Nor Arevelk) as a inspirational force that can bring together “the architects of Georgia, Azerbaijan, Uzbekistan, and Turkmenistan" in a concerted effort to build an internationalist Yerevan. In spite of the work's distinct emphasis on socialist internationalism, Stalinist censors banned the book one year upon publication arguing that it “promotes local nationalism and encourages a turn toward the feudal East".

His novels and short stories made him famous both in his native Armenia and in the wider Soviet Union. His magnum opus is the 1935 novel Heghnar aghbyur (The Fountain of Heghnar), which was later made into a film. He fell out of favor with the authorities, was deported to Siberia, and later released. He published an account of camp life in 1964 and died eight years later in Yerevan.
