= Aramus, Armenia =

Aramus Արամուս
- Village
- Location within Armenia
- Coordinates: 40°15′04″N 44°39′47″E
- Country: Armenia
- Marz (Province): Kotayk
- Elevation: 1,420 m (4,660 ft)

Population (2011)
  - Total: 3,412
- Time zone: UTC+4 ( )
  - Summer (DST): UTC+5 ( )

Aramus (Armenian: Արամուս) is a village in the Kotayk Province of Armenia. Its located at 43 km of the Getar river and 25 km of the armenian capital, Yerevan.

== Etymology ==
The name of the village came from a myth during the ancient times of the kingdom of Armenia. Through this era, an Armenian hero called Ara Geghetsik (translated as "Ara the Handsome") fought a battle in the village's area against the mythical Assyrian queen Semiramis. During the battle, Ara Geghetsik was wounded in the shoulder. Because of that wound, the place was called Aram's shoulder (Armenian: Արամի ուսը, romanized: Arami usə) and then, after linguistics evolutions of centuries, the name changed to Aramus.

== Topography and Climate ==
The village of Aramus is part of the Kotayk Province of the historic Ayrarat province of Greater Armenia . Nowadays, it is a part of the Kotayk region, 25 km away from the city of Yerevan. Its at east of the Yerevan-San highway. The nearest city is Abovyan. Aramus is located on the Kotayk volcanic plateau, at 1420 meters above sea level. The Geghama volcanic plateau rises in the eastern part of Aramus, and the Hatis volcanic massif rises in the northeast . The area is dominated by mountain-steppe landscapes, covered with slippery soils. Atmospheric precipitation are about 500 mm in yearly average. All climate seasons happens in the region through the year. The entrails of the village are rich in volcanic building stones with basalt and tuff.

== History and Archeological site ==
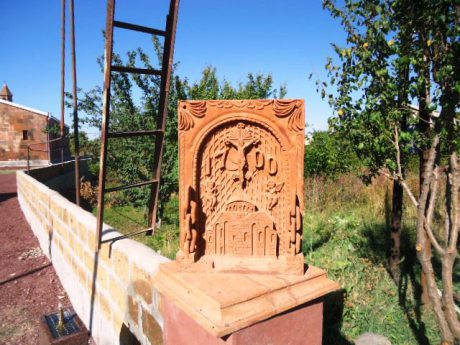
Sourb Hakob Church, Aramoos village, Kotayk region, Armenia

The surroundings of Aramus stand out with archeological and historical-architectural monuments. Many complexes are considered built from the first millennium to the Middle Ages. The huge fortress-settlement of "Nokhut Tapay" in the area of Aramus village stands out among them, The excavations of the castle started in the 1980s with the efforts of the archeological expedition of Yerevan State University. The process of archeological survey in the area stopped due to the 1988's Spitak earthquake and the dissolution of the USSR. Regular excavations continued from 2004 in the northern part of the eastern outskirts of the castle.

Before the end of the century, an excavation site with an area of about 250 square meters was made. Continuing the excavations, the expedition aimed to clarify the stages of construction of the castle, to clarify the chronological problems, the stratigraphic realities, etc. The north tower, the first wall built near the eastern entrance of the citadel, was cleaned. Especially, The remnants of the fence found in the opening. Most likely, this wall dates back to the pre-Urartian period and is characterized as a remnant of a Cyclops fortress inhabited from the Bronze Age. The latter refers to: During the reign of Van, it joins the remains of a powerful tower in the eastern part of the citadel. This wall, with its structural peculiarity, repeats similar buildings of the Kingdom. Studies have shown that the last wall surrounding the citadel is a post-Urartian system that existed in the early Middle Ages. Thus, Aramus fortress has three main chronological stages: pre-Urartian, Urartian and post-Urartian.

== Economy and Population ==
The population is engaged in cattle breeding, cultivation of grain, tobacco and vegetables. The changes of Aramus population have been continuous since the last surveys.

Year	1831	1873	1907	1914	1922	1931	1959	1970	1979	1989	2001	2004	2008	2011
Population	228	803	1241	1780	1853	1770	1620	2242	2492	3118	3320	3491	3237	3412

== See also ==
- Kotayk Province
- Semiramis
- Ara the Handsome
- Urartu
