= Emilio Notte =

Italian painter

- Born: 30 January 1891; Ceglie Messapica, Apulia, Italy
- Died: 7 July 1982 (aged 91); Naples, Italy
- Education: Neapolitan Academy of Fine Arts
- Occupation: painter
- Years active: 1912–1982
- Known for: won a competition at the Liceo Artistico di Venezia, 1923

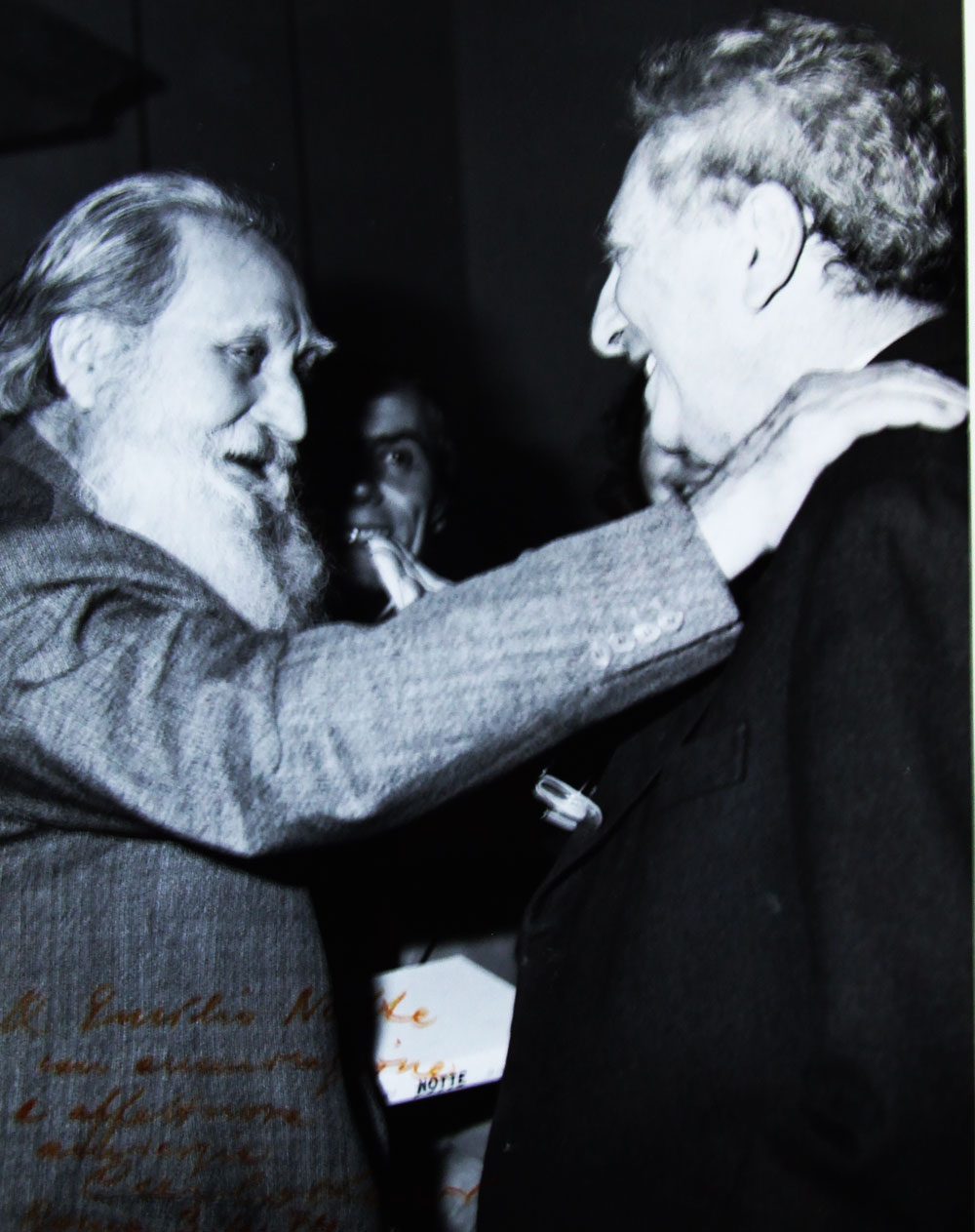
Emilio Notte and Carlo Levi in Rome (1974)

Emilio Notte (30 January 1891 – 7 July 1982) was an Italian painter, active in a Futurist style.

== Biography ==
Notte's parents were originally from Vicenza, but he was born in Ceglie Messapica, in the region of Apulia. From there, by 1906, he was sent to Naples to study at the Neapolitan Academy of Fine Arts, directed by Vincenzo Volpe. From there, he moved to Florence, where he worked under Adolfo De Carolis. But also encountered the elder Giovanni Fattori, and encountered the painters Giovanni Michelucci, Attilio Cavallini, Plinio Nomellini, Galileo Chini, Curzio Malaparte, Dino Campana and Ardengo Soffici.

At the age of 21 years, he exhibited at the tenth Venice Biennale. In 1913–1914, he joined common circles with futurists painters, such as Umberto Boccioni, Filippo Tommaso Marinetti, Carlo Carrà, and Aldo Palazzeschi. He joined the first World War effort, and was wounded in combat.

At the beginning of 1918, Notte moved to Milan, where he often attended Margherita Sarfatti's salon of artists. He then clashed with Mussolini who, jealous of Sarfatti, saw him as a potential rival.

In 1923 Notte won a competition at the Liceo Artistico di Venezia; in 1924, after winning a national award, he moved to Rome. He returned to Naples in 1929, and worked there the rest of his life. He donated many of his works to the town of Ceglie, housed in a Pinacoteca named after him.
