= Vinicio Paladini =

Italian architect, painter and art theorist (1902–1971)

- Born: 21 June 1902; Moscow, Russia
- Died: 30 December 1971 (aged 69); Rome, Italy
- Occupation: Artist

Vinicio Paladini (21 June 1902 – 30 December 1971) was an Italian architect, painter and art theorist.

== Life and career ==
The son of an Italian father and a Russian mother, Paladini was born in Moscow in 1902, but by 1903 he had already settled with his family in Rome. Despite his closeness to socialist and pro-Soviet ideas, in the early 1920s he joined the Futurist movement in accordance with the theories of Alexander Bogdanov, according to whom Futurism was an anti-bourgeois movement and would have facilitated the advent of the revolution. A close friend and frequent collaborator of Ivo Pannaggi, he staged with him a "Futurist Mechanical Dance" in the Casa Arte Bragaglia in 1922, and the same year the two signed the "Manifesto of Futurist Mechanical Art", which theorized the identification between proletariat and machine. Filippo Tommaso Marinetti opposed this interpretation, and in 1923 republished the manifesto in a largely reworked version, which was publicly disavowed by Paladini and which, along with Marinetti's public display of Fascist faith, marked his departure from the movement. In the second half of the 1920s he launched the Imaginist movement, which took up motifs from Futurism along with others borrowed from Constructivism, Dadaism and Surrealism.

Hostilized by both his futurist colleagues and his left-wing colleagues who had considered his adherence to Futurism as an ideological betrayal, Paladini later experienced a period of marginalization, which led him to move away from Italy on several occasions, in particular finding good success in the United States, where he lived between 1938 and 1953, and which he was forced to leave because of McCarthyism.

In his varied artistic life, Paladini was active as an architect, a painter, a production designer for cinema and theater, and a graphic designer for magazines and advertisements.
