= Ivo Pannaggi =

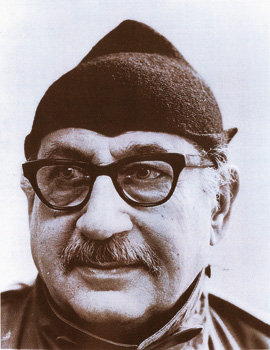
Image of Ivo Pannaggi

Ivo Pannaggi (Macerata, August 28, 1901– Macerata, May 11, 1981) was an Italian painter and architect who was active in the Futurist movement and later associated with the Bauhaus.

== Biography ==
Pannaggi was born in Macerata in 1901. He studied architecture in Rome and Florence. Pannaggi lived in Berlin between 1927 and 1929. He moved to Norway in 1939 and returned to Italy in 1971.

== Art ==
=== Futurism ===
Pannaggi joined the Futurist movement in 1918, but left soon after because of disagreements with Fillippo Marinetti. In 1922, he and Vinicio Paladini published their “Manifesto of Futurist Mechanical Art." The manifesto emphasized the importance of machine aesthetics (arte meccanica), which became one of the dominant strands of Futurism in the 1920s. He and Paladini also staged the Mechanical Futurist Ballet (Ballo meccano futurista) at Anton Giulio Bragaglia's Casa d'Arte.

Around the same time he painted Speeding Train (Treno in corsa), perhaps his most famous work.

He also created many photomontage works. In Postal Collages (1925), Pannaggi created a series of unfinished photomontages that would be completed through the inevitable addition of stamps and seals by postal workers—an early instance of mail art.

=== Germany and the Bauhaus ===
In 1927, Pannaggi traveled to Berlin, where he would live until 1929. He became friends with Kurt Schwitters and Walter Benjamin and published photomontage works in German newspapers.

Between 1932 and 1933, Pannaggi attended the Bauhaus, the only Futurist other than Nicolaj Diugheroff to do so.

=== Exhibition History ===
His art was exhibited at the Civic Museum of Palazzo Mosca in Macerata (1922), Yale University Art Gallery (1941), Galleria Studio di Arte Moderna in Rome (1969), and at the Musée National d'Art Moderne in Paris (1981). His work is held at many museums, including the Museum of Modern Art, the Yale University Art Gallery, and the Stedelijk Museum.
