= Serata =

A Serata is one of a series of events organised by the futurists. These events combined artistic and nationalist political agendas with the intention of implementing change.

== The first serata ==
The first serata was held at Politeama Rossetti, Trieste, in 1910. Marinetti chose Triste because it was part of the Austro-Hungarian Empire. Marinetti had already demonstrated his support for Guglielmo Oberdan, and had demonstrated the importance of Trieste for his irredentist campaign by declaring it "Our Beautiful Powder-Maga-zin".
