= Bozhidar (poet) =

Russian writer (1894–1914)

Bogdan Gordeev (Bozhidar)
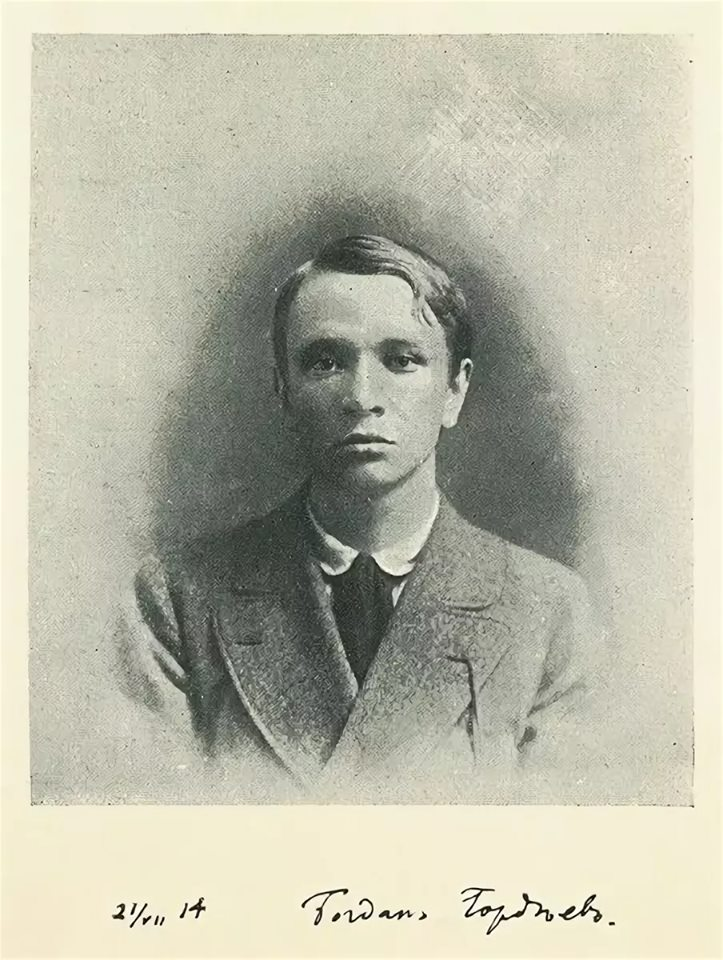
- Born: 21 June 1894; Kharkiv, Kharkov Governorate, Russian Empire (present-day Ukraine)
- Died: 7 September 1914 (aged 20) near Kharkiv, Kharkov Governorate, Russian Empire
- Education: Third Kharkiv Gymnasium
- Occupation: Poet

Bogdan Petrovich Gordeev (Russian: Богда́н Петро́вич Горде́ев, IPA: [bɐˈɡdan pʲɪˈtrovʲɪtɕ ɡɐrˈdʲeɪf]; 21 June 1894– 7 September 1914), also known as Bozhidar (Russian: Божида́р, IPA: [bəʐɨˈdar]), was a Russian futurist poet of Ukrainian origin.

Bozhidar (sometimes transliterated Bojidar) is also a Bulgarian given name.

== Biography and literary career ==
Bogdan Petrovich Gordeev was born into the family of a professor of Veterinary Institute and a school teacher.

He attended the Third Kharkiv Gymnasium, graduating with a gold medal in 1913.

After graduating, Gordeev, strongly influenced by creations of Velemir Khlebnikov, took his pseudonym and became intimate with a literary group "Centrifuge" (Russian: "Центрифу́га"), which was founded in the same year by Boris Pasternak, Sergey Bobrov and Nikolay Aseev. In the beginning of 1914, Bozhidar, Aseev and Grigory Petnikov founded publishing house Liren (Лирень). Later in that year, the only book of poems by Bozidar – “Tambourine” (Russian: "Бубен", in the spelling of the author, mixing the graphics of the Latin alphabet and Cyrillic alphabet – “Byben”), was published.

Bozhidar committed suicide by hanging on 7 September 1914 in a forest near Kharkiv, partially due to the beginning of World War I.

His prosody tractate and Byben's second issue were published posthumously.

Bozhidar was also posthumously included in Khlebnikov's "Chairmen of the Globe" society by its founder: Khlebnikov wrote his name under "Martians' Trumpet" manifest in 1916.

== See also ==
- Russian Futurism
