= Luigi De Giudici =

Italian painter (1887–1955)

Luigi de Giudici
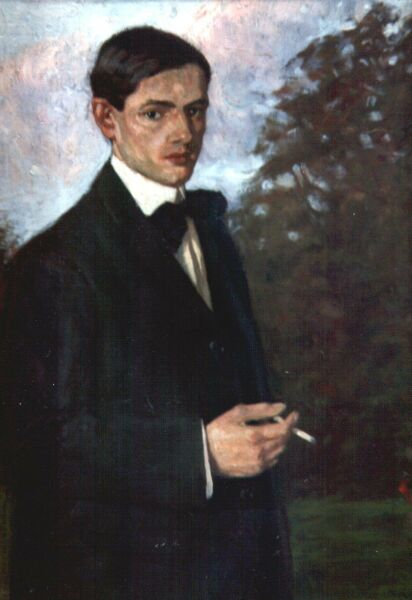
- Selfportrait, 1910
- Born: Luigi De Giudici; 19 December 1887; Pavia di Udine
- Died: 16 February 1955 (aged 67); Venice
- Known for: Painting
- Movement: Futurism

Luigi De Giudici (12 December 1882 – 16 February 1955) was an Italian painter of the Venetian anti-academic movement in the first years of the twentieth century. His works were exhibited at Ca' Pesaro between 1912 and 1920 and at the International Exposition of Paris (1937).

== Life ==
He was born in Pavia di Udine of Friuli origins on his father's side and Carnia origins on his mother's side. He artistically grew up in Venice. Starting from the representation of a living room world of liberty taste, also through the irony of caricature, he was sensible to the avant-garde movements of the beginning of the twentieth century, from Futurism to Expressionism, from the movement of Pont-Aven to the Secessions in Vienna and Munich. He artistically formed in the unrepeatable melting pot of styles and newness of the Barbantini's Ca' Pesaro of the 1910s. Among his friends were Boccioni, Gino Rossi, Arturo Martini, Mauroner, Pellis, and Pomi.

His career was interrupted in 1919 when, at the age of 32 years, he decided to stop painting. He got married and had six children, and made his living by managing his properties. He was Mayor of Oderzo from 1925 to 1927.

He went back to painting in 1931 for personal pleasure and finally stopped in 1937. When he died in Venice in 1955, his early paintings were found in a locked chest. Only by chance his son Angelo found his name in a list of exhibitors of Ca' Pesaro and in 1992 Luigi De Guidici started to be studied.

== Works ==
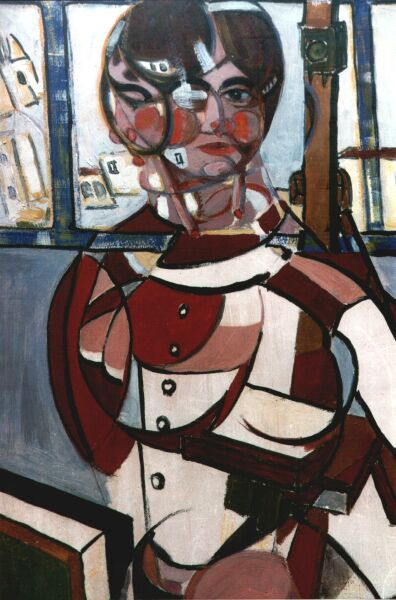
Scomposizione di donna, 1912

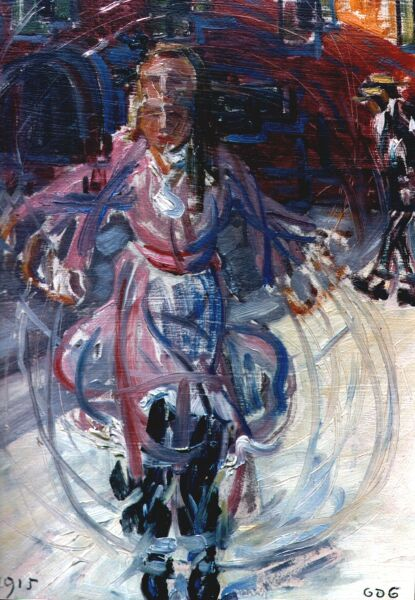
Agilità, 1915

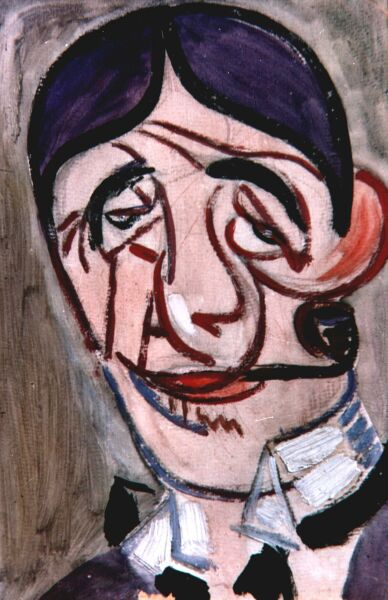
Uomo con pipa, 1916

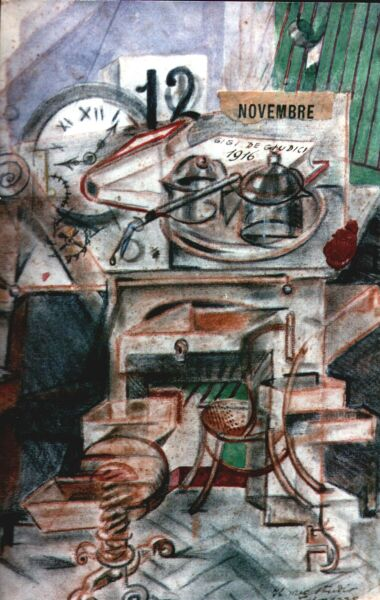
Il mio studio a Tolmezzo, 1916

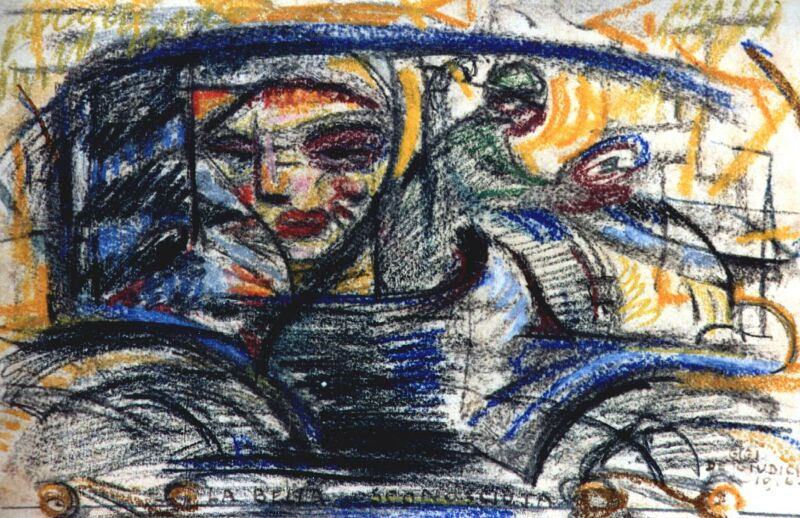
La bella sconosciuta, 1916

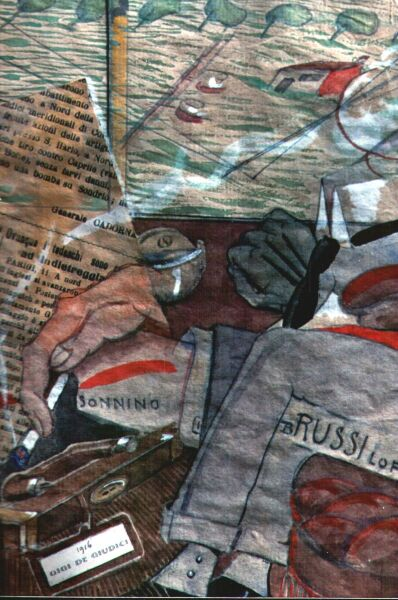
Viaggiare, 1916

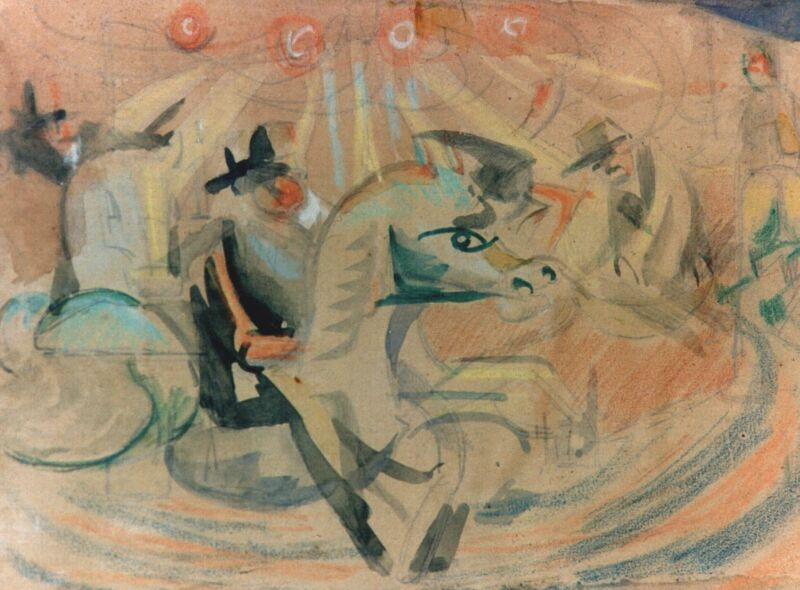
La giostra

== Exhibitions ==
- 1912
  - Venezia, Esposizione Permanente d'Arte e d'Industrie Veneziane, Ca' Pesaro, 29 June - 11 October
- 1913
  - Venezia, Opera Bevilacqua La Masa - Esposizione Permanente d'Arte e d'Industrie Veneziane, Ca'Pesaro, 18 May - 5 October
- 1915
  - Venezia, Esposizione di bozzetti degli artisti veneziani, Hotel Vittoria, 8–22 February
- 1919
  - Milano, Grande Esposizione Nazionale Futurista, 'Galleria Centrale d'Arte', marzo, p. 10
  - Venezia, Esposizione d'Arte in Palazzo Pesaro, Ca' Pesaro, 15 July - 5 October
  - Lido di Venezia, Esposizione Nazionale di Belle Arti, 13 July
  - Lido di Venezia, Mostra di bozzetti di pittura e scultura indetta dal Gruppo femminile dell'Associazione Trento - Trieste Sezione di Venezia, 17 August - 7 October
  - Venezia, I^ Esposizione d'Arte del Circolo Artistico, Galleria Geri - Boralevi, 29 December - 2 February
- 1920
  - Venezia, Esposizione Permanente d'Arti e d'Industrie veneziane, Ca' Pesaro, 17 July - 30 September
- 1921
  - Treviso, Prima Mostra Regionale d'Arte, Palazzo Gabelli, September
  - Venezia, Esposizione del Circolo Artistico, July
- 1927
  - Treviso, VII Mostra d'Arte Trevigiana, Salone dei 300, 16 October - 11 November
- 1936
  - Venezia, XXVII Esposizione dell'Opera Bevilacqua La Masa VII del Sindacato Interprovinciale Fascista Belle Arti, Palazzo Reale, Sala Napoleonica, 15 April - 30 May
- 1937
  - Venezia, XXVIII Esposizione dell'Opera Bevilacqua La Masa VIII del Sindacato Interprovinciale Fascista Belle Arti, Palazzo Reale, Sala Napoleonica, 15 April - 30 May
  - Parigi, Mostra d'Arte Italiana all'Esposizione Universale di Parigi
- 1999'
  - Venezia, Emblemi d'Arte da Boccioni a Tancredi. Cent'anni della Fondazione Bevilacqua La Masa 1899-1999, Galleria Bevilacqua La Masa, 6 March - 2 May
  - Modena, La Pittura a Venezia dagli anni di Ca' Pesaro alla Nuova Oggettività 1905-1940, Palazzo Montecuccoli, Fondazione Cassa di Risparmio di Modena 28 November - 30 January
- 2000
  - Venezia, Gigi De Giudici 1887 - 1955, Fondazione Querini Stampalia, 9 November - 10 December
- 2001
  - Venezia, Donazione Eugenio Da Venezia, Fondazione Querini Stampalia, 10 November - 10 December
- 2002
  - Oderzo, Gigi De Giudici e Oderzo, 1887-1955 Tra Futurismo e Novecento, Palazzo Foscolo, 26 April - 30 June
- 2004
  - Mestre, Gigi De Giudici, 1887-1955 Tra modernità e tradizione, Centro Culturale Candiani, 29 January - 15 February
- 2005
  - Tolmezzo, Luigi De Giudici Pittore Futurista in Carnia dal 1910 al 1920, Palazzo Frisacco, 30 July - 22 August
  - Spinea, De Giudici Olii e disegni, Oratorio di Santa Maria Assunta, 9–30 September
- 2007
  - Torre di Mosto, Tra mare e laguna, Museo del paesaggio di Torre di Mosto, 16 June - 2 September
- 2008
  - Torre di Mosto, La seduzione del paesaggio, Museo del paesaggio di Torre di Mosto, 12 July - 7 September

== Further reading (in Italian) ==
- Gigi De Giudici 1887-1955 (catalogo della mostra, Fondazione Querini Stampalia), a cura di Giuseppina dal Canton, Venezia, Donazione Eugenio Da Venezia, quaderno n°7, Venezia, 9 novembre-10 dicembre 2000
- Dizionario del Futurismo, a cura di E. Godoli, Ed. Vallecchi, Firenze, 2001, pp. 361–362
- Bromojodicherie tolmezzine 1914-17 ovvero….la gente di Tumiec durante la Grande Guerra nei disegni e caricature di Luigi De Giudici, di Pier Giuseppe Avanzato, Ed. Andrea Moro, Tolmezzo, 2005
- Dal "vero" accademico al naturalismo novecentista passando per l'avanguardia: le opere donate dagli Eredi De Giudici al Fondo Da Venezia, in Donazione Eugenio Da Venezia, Fondazione Scientifica Querini Stampalia, Venezia, 2001, pp. 79– 80 ("Quaderni della Donazione Eugenio Da Venezia", 8) Sito Università di Venezia
