= Avan-Arinj =

- Location within Armenia
- Coordinates: 40°13′21″N 44°34′13″E
- Country: Armenia
- Marz (Province): Yerevan
- District: Avan
- Time zone: UTC+4 ( )
  - Summer (DST): UTC+

Avan-Arinj (Armenian: Ավան-Առինջ), is a neighbourhood in the Avan District of Yerevan, Armenia.
