= Getar =

River in Armenia

Getar River
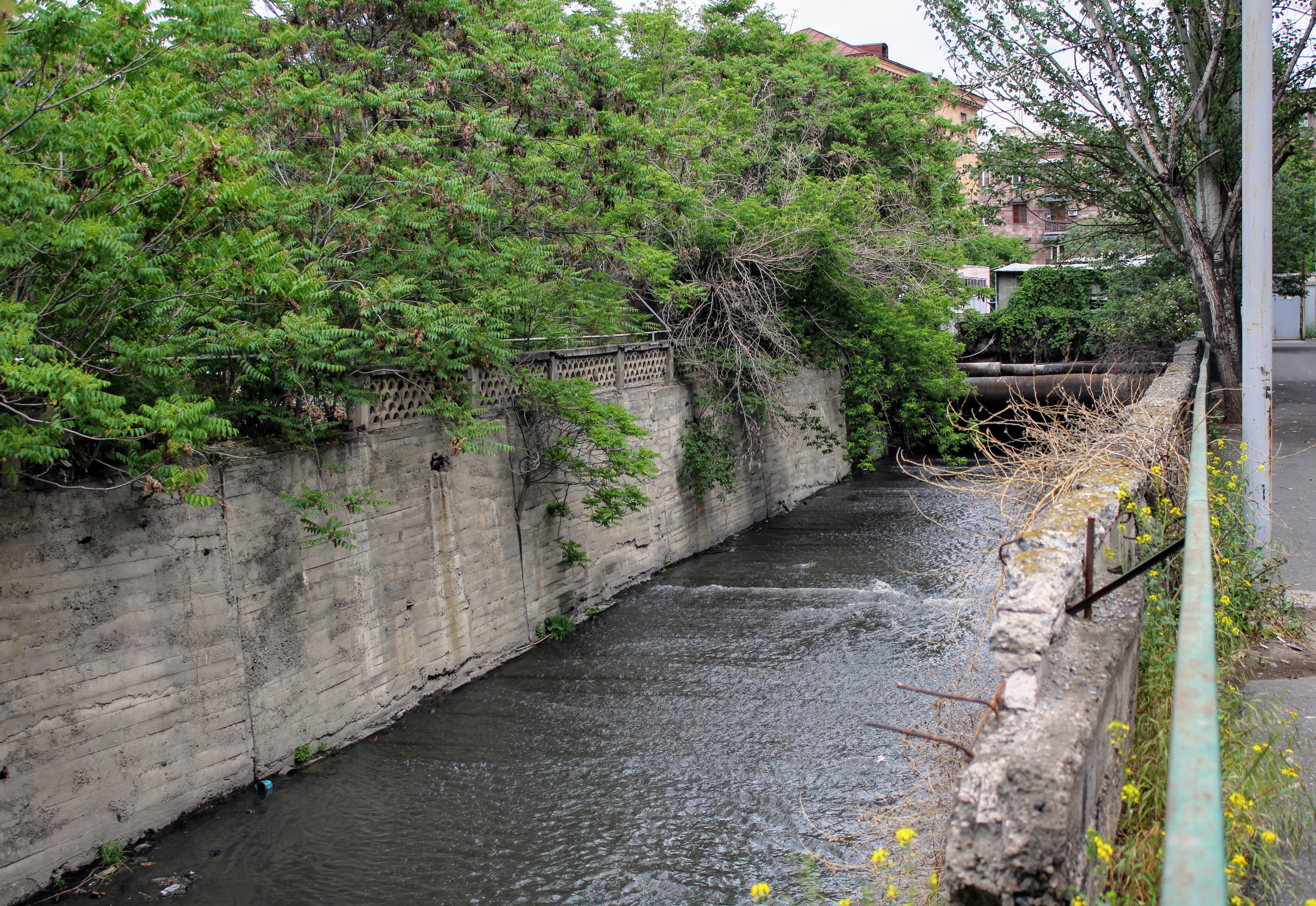

Location
- Country: Armenia

Physical characteristics
- Source
  - location: Gegham mountains, Kotayk Province
- Mouth: Hrazdan
  - coordinates: 40.1499°N 44.4941°E
- Length: 24 km (15 mi)

Basin features
- Progression: Hrazdan→ Aras→ Kura→ Caspian Sea

The Getar (Գետառ), formerly spelled Gedar, is a small river in Armenia that flows through Kotayk Province and central parts of the capital Yerevan. It originates near the village of Mayakovski at the western parts of Gegham mountains, flows through Avan-Arinj and joins the Hrazdan at the outskirts of Yerevan. Its length is about 24 kilometres (15 mi).

== The bridge ==
In 1664, a bridge was built on the Getar river near the old Nork district in the opposing side of the entrance to Yerevan Zoo. The structure was built by an architect named Grigor with the financial support of vardapet Hovhannes of Nork. The bridge held a great significance in the past because it served as the only way of crossing from the north to Yerevan. It was one of the few buildings in the area to survive the devastating earthquake in 1679. Under the Soviet rule in the 1950s, the bridge was renovated and was granted state protection. The bridge has been well preserved to this day and stands 7 meters high.

== Mudflows ==
There have been several mudflows of the Getar throughout history, the most notable of these occurred in 1860, 1866, 1873, 1912, 1923, 1924, 1946, 1947 and 1950.

The most recent serious mudflow of Getar occurred on May 25, 1946. The mudflow "caused serious damage and destruction to the city. Around 800 houses were destroyed and another 630 were seriously damaged". The flood started at 8:30 p.m. and lasted for five and half hours. It involved Alaverdyan, Nalbandyan and Abovyan streets and left about 200 casualties. After the flood, the locals were surprised to find rocks measuring 2 to 3 meters in diameter deposited in the streets.

During the 1950s, a series of hydro-technical and afforestation projects were implemented including a tunnel linking the Getar to Hrazdan River to prevent future mudflows in Yerevan.
