= Bruno Giordano Sanzin =

Italian poet (1906–1994)

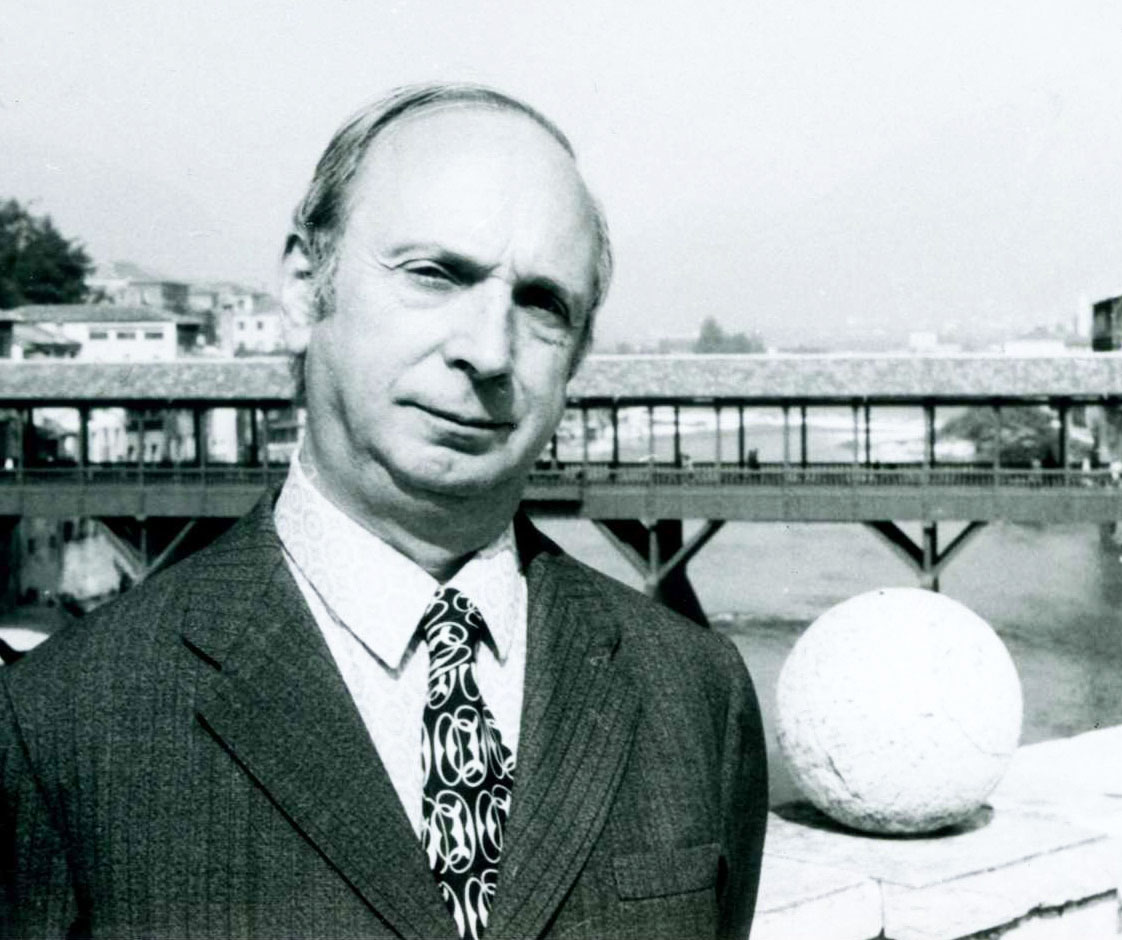
- Born: 14 February 1906
- Died: 12 January 1994 (aged 87)
- Known for: Poetry, Futurism

Bruno Giordano Sanzin (14 February 1906, in Trieste – 12 January 1994) was an Italian poet. He was one of the principal writers featured in the Futurist magazine, L'auroro, Revista mensile de arte e de vita published from December 1923 to October 1924.
