= Giannina Censi =

Italian dancer and choreographer

- Born: 25 January 1913; Milan, Italy
- Died: 5 May 1995 (aged 82); Voghera, Italy
- Movement: Danza Futurista

Giannina Censi (1913–1995) was an Italian dancer and choreographer. She is known for her contributions to Danza Futurista (Italian for Futurist dance).

== Biography ==
Censi was born on 25 January 1913 in Milan. She studied classical dance under Lyubov Yegorova, as well as Indian dance with Uday Shankar. Censi went on to study the works of Italian Futurist artist Filippo Tommaso Marinetti.

In 1931, the Galleria Pesaro de Milan presented her choreographed Aerodance (based on the concept of Aeropaintering).

Censi died in Voghera on 5 May 1995.

In 2021 her work was in the exhibition Women in Abstraction at the Centre Pompidou. In 2022 the 59th Venice Biennale included Censi's work in the Seduction of the Cyborg.
