= Farfa (poet) =

Italian painter and poet

Vittorio Osvaldo Tommasini, better known by the pen name Farfa, (1879, in Trieste – 1964, in San Remo) was an Italian painter and poet, who joined the Italian Futurism Movement.
