= Thayaht =

Italian artist and designer

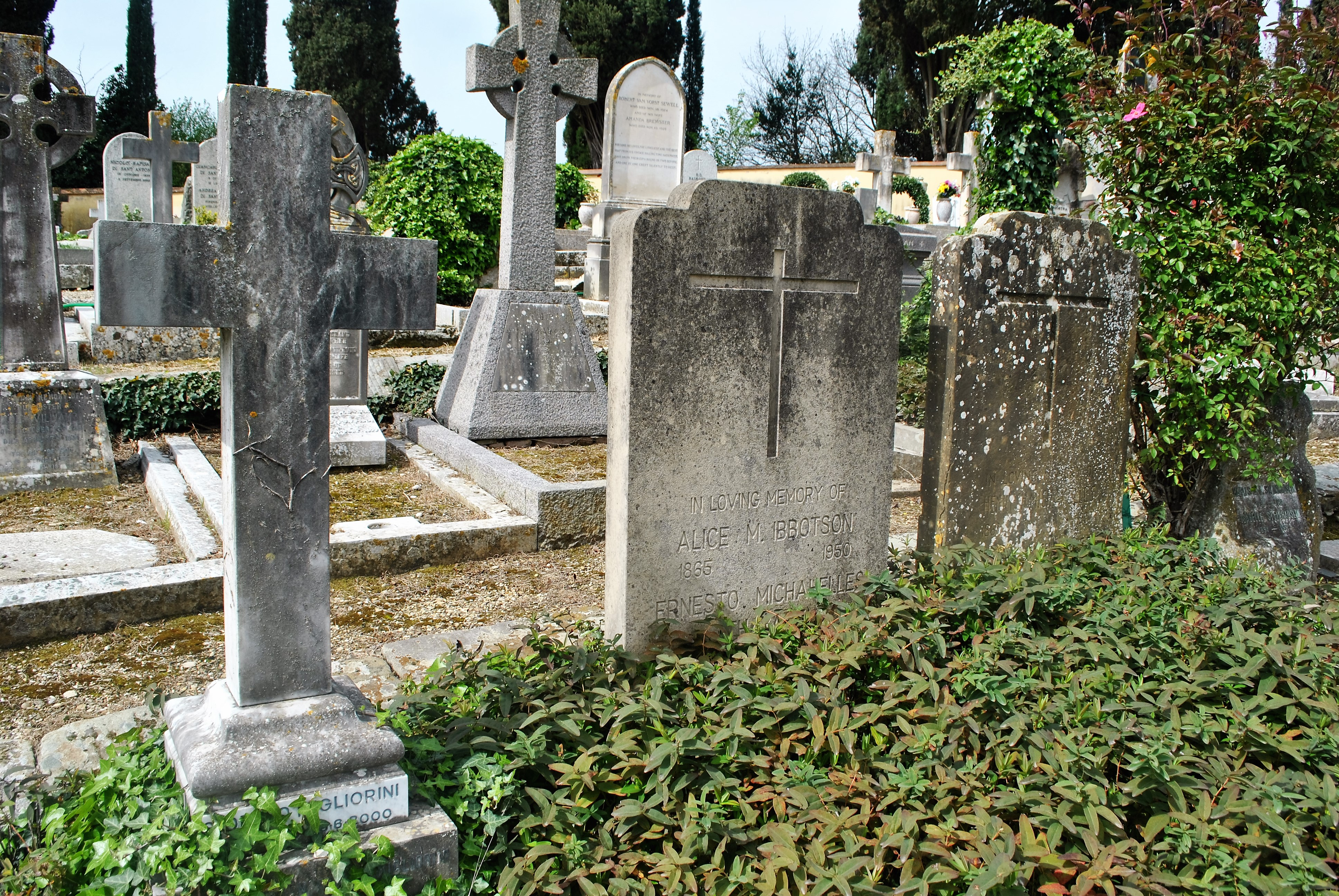
Cimitero degli Allori, Ernesto Michahelles Thayaht

Thayaht (born Ernesto Michahelles, 1893–1959) was an Italian visual artist and designer best known for his revolutionary design of the TuTa and his involvement with the Futurist movement.

== Early life ==
Ernesto Michahelles was born in Florence, Italy on August 21, 1893. He had British, German, Swiss and American ancestry. His great grandfather was American neoclassical sculptor Hiram Powers. He studied painting at the Académie Ranson in Paris, as well as scientific dyes and dynamic structure at Harvard University.

== Biography ==
Michahelles worked as studio assistant for Filippo Marfori Savini and Julius Rolshoven. He started exhibiting his work under the pseudonym of "Cheak", until a severe hepatic disease forced him to temporarily interrupt his practice. In 1919, he decided to move to Paris, encouraged by Sergei Diaghilev and Léonide Massine. He started collaborating with the fashion house of Madeleine Vionnet, in Rue de Rivoli, for which he created the logo. Around this time, he chose to adopt the pseudonym "THAYAHT". When written entirely in uppercase letters, it is a "bifrontal" palindrome, meaning it's visually symmetrical and can be read from right to left, left to right, and as its own reflection.

In 1920, Thayaht started designing the TuTa, which he called "the most innovative, futuristic garment ever produced in the history of Italian fashion". An early example of coveralls, the TuTa was intended to establish a modern and innovative Italian fashion style. With help from his younger brother and fellow artist RAM (acronym for Ruggero Alfredo Michahelles), he launched the new design in 1920, and the pattern was published by the newspaper "La Nazione" so that the TuTa was accessible to all. Intended as a practical item of clothing for the everyday, it was instead adopted as a fad by high Florentine society. In this period, he cooperated with the Florentine Art Gallery Cavalensi & Botti and attended the gallery-bookshop of Errante Gonnelli, the core of the cultural and artistic avant-garde in Florence.

In 1921, following the success of his solo exhibition, he left for the United States where he spent a short time in Boston and Cambridge. He attended courses at Harvard University on the colour technique, dynamic symmetry and the numeric absolute. The following year, he reconfirmed his collaboration with The Atelier of Madame Vionnet, the couturière credited with introducing the bias-cut to Parisian fashion who offered the artist a contract as designer to assure the exclusive use of his creations. He started out by designing the logo for the Maison Vionnet and quickly became responsible for the graphic presentation of her new models, many published in the magazine Gazzette du Bon Ton. Thayaht also developed numerous patterns for printing on fabric that Vionnet used for her dresses and designed some original models. This collaboration lasted until December 12, 1924.

In 1922, Thayaht helped establishing the Corporazione delle Arti Decorative in Florence, to promote the collaboration between artists and artisans. The following year, he participated in the 1st International Exposition of Decorative and Industrial Modern Arts in Monza, with an array of furniture projected by himself and displayed along with Antonio Maraini's sculptures.

In 1924-25, he participated with RAM at the formation of the First Guild of Fine Arts of Florence, creating its own crest and they won the National Contest of Stage Design for the new staging of the "Aida".

In 1927, he participated in the 3rd Esposizione Internazionale delle Arti Decorative e Industriali Moderne and was chosen by the National Fascist Group of Straw as designer for new models of hats for men and women.

From 1929, he regularly published his projects on Moda, the official magazine for the National Fascist Federation of Clothing Industry. In the same year, Primo Conti introduced him to Filippo Tommaso Marinetti. Thayaht would later present the steel-iron effigy of the "Dux" as a gift to Mussolini, officially joining the Futurist movement. In October of the same year, he participated in the exhibition "Trentatré Futuristi", at the Galleria Pesaro in Milan, with three sculptures and fifteen paintings. He also took part in the "1929 Barcelona International Exposition", winning the gold medal for his invention of taiattite – an alloy of silver and aluminium.

In 1930 he participated in the 4th Esposizione Triennale Internazionale delle Arti Decorative ed Industriali Moderne, exposing furniture and items made of a material of his invention called taiattite. At the XII Venice Biennale, he exhibited six sculptures in the futurist room. He also took part in the "Mostra Internazionale dell'Orafo" where he presented a showcase with jewelry in taiattite.

In 1931, he was invited to the 1st Rome Quadriennale, where he exhibited his first aerosculpture, "Victory of the Air". He organized with Marasco the "Futurist Exhibition of Painting, Sculpture, Aeropainting, Decorative Arts, Architecture" at the Art Gallery of Florence for the Tuscan Futurist group and joined the "First Aeropainting Exhibition" along with the likes of Giacomo Balla, Ballelica, Benedetta Cappa, Nikolay Diulgheroff, Gerardo Dottori, Fillia, Enrico Prampolini, Vittorio Somenzi and Tato, organized by the Gallery La camerata degli Artisti in Rome. On April 10 of that year, he write an open letter on the Genoa newspaper Indice in response to an article by Ezra Pound about futurist sculpture, claiming that it is possible to represent an object in a three-dimensional plane with a new technique, described as "Traiettiva".

In 1932, he participated in the exhibition "Enrico Prampolini et les Aeropeintres Futuristes Italiens" at the Galerie de la Renaissance in Paris. In May of 1932, he showed his sculpture "The Diving" at the XVIII Venice Biennale. His first monography was published in Florence with essays by Marinetti, Antonio Maraini and Fortunato Bellonzi. In 1932 he co-authored with RAM the "Manifesto per la trasformazione dell’abbigliamento maschile". (Manifesto for the Transformation of Man Clothing)

In the following years, he participated in the Venice Biennale in 1934 and 1936.

== Later life ==
In the mid-1930s, Thayaht retired to Marina di Pietrasanta, where he concentrated on studying science and astronomy. After World War Two, he founded the CIRNOS (independent station for the recording of space information) with the aim of recording and providing proof of UFOs.

== Death ==
Thayaht died in Marina di Pietrasanta (LU) on April 29, 1959, and was buried in the Cimitero Evangelico degli Allori in the southern suburb of Florence, Galluzzo (Italy).
