= Tullio Crali =

Dalmatian Italian artist

Tullio Crali (6 December 1910, in Igalo – 5 August 2000, in Milan) was a Dalmatian Italian artist associated with Futurism. A self-taught painter, he was a late adherent to the movement, not joining until 1929. He is noted for realistic paintings that combine "speed, aerial mechanisation and the mechanics of aerial warfare", though in a long career he painted in other styles as well.

== Early life ==
Crali was born in the Bay of Kotor on the coast of Montenegro. His family lived in Zara until 1922, when they moved to Gorizia. At the age of fifteen, while a student at the local technical institute, Crali discovered Futurism. He took up painting, influenced by Giacomo Balla and Enrico Prampolini.

== Career ==
=== Aeropittura ===
In 1928 Crali flew for the first time. His enthusiasm for flying and his experience as a pilot influenced his art. In 1929, through Sofronio Pocarini, he made contact with Marinetti, the founder of Futurism, and joined the movement. In the same year aeropittura was launched in the manifesto, Perspectives of Flight, signed by Benedetta, Depero, Dottori, Fillia, Marinetti, Prampolini, Somenzi and Guglielmo Sansoni (Tato). The manifesto stated that "The changing perspectives of flight constitute an absolutely new reality that has nothing in common with the reality traditionally constituted by a terrestrial perspective" and that "Painting from this new reality requires a profound contempt for detail and a need to synthesise and transfigure everything.”

Despite his relative youth, Crali played a significant part in aeropittura. His earliest aeropitture represent military planes, Aerial Squadron and Aerial Duel (both 1929). In the 1930s, his paintings became realistic, intending to communicate the experience of flight to the viewer. His best-known work, Nose Dive on the City (1939), shows an aerial dive from the pilot's point of view, the buildings below drawn in dizzying perspective.

Crali exhibited in Trieste and Padua. In 1932 Marinetti invited him to exhibit in Paris in the first aeropittura exhibition there. He participated in the Rome Quadrennial in 1935, 1939 and 1943 and the Venice Biennale of 1940. At that time Crali was researching signs and scenery, leading in 1933 to his participation in the film exhibition Futuristi Scenotecnica in Rome. In 1936 he exhibited with Dottori and Prampolini in the International Exhibition of Sports Art at the Berlin Olympics.

Crali's declamatory abilities and his friendship with Marinetti led him to organise Futurist evenings at Gorizia, Udine and Trieste, where he read the manifesto Plastic Illusionism of War and Protecting the Earth which he had co-authored with Marinetti. He also published a Manifesto of Musical Words - Alphabet in Freedom.

=== After the Second World War ===
Crali lived in Turin after the war, where he continued to promote Futurist events. Despite the ending of the Futurist movement with the death of Marinetti in 1944 and its Fascist reputation, Crali remained attached to its ideals and aesthetic.

Between 1950 and 1958 he lived in Paris, making occasional visits to Britain. He moved to Milan in 1958 where he remained (apart from a five-year period teaching at the Italian Academy of Fine Arts, Cairo) for the rest of his life. In Milan he began to collect and catalogue documents relating to his life and work. He donated his archive and several of his works to the Museo di arte moderna e contemporanea di Trento e Rovereto.

=== "Sassintesi" and later life ===
In 1959 he published the first post-war Futurist manifesto Sassintesi (“Stone Syntheses”). In it he advocated a new form of artistic expression using natural materials - pebbles, stones and rocks formed of various minerals. “The inherent qualities of colour, form, translucence, texture, etc. were to suggest, develop and determine the idea of the artist, while their appearance and positioning produced a harmonious composition that relied much on the stones' natural symbiosis with the [cosmos.” His sassintesi were exhibited in Milan in 1961. He tried to revive aeropittura in the late 1960s in a manifesto Orbital Art. His painting Frecce Tricolori (1966) depicts jet fighter planes. He continued to paint, sculpt, teach and lecture throughout the 'sixties, 'seventies and into the 'eighties.

At his own wish, Crali was buried at Macerata, which remains the home of his family.

== Works ==
- Le forze della curva, 1930 (Long-term storage. Museum of Modern and Contemporary Art of Trento and Rovereto, Rovereto)
- Acrobazie in cielo - 1930 (Galleria Arte Centro, Milan)
- Bombardamento notturno - 1931
- Ali Tricolori - 1932
- In decollo - 1932
- Ballelica - 1932
- Volo Condiviso - 1933
- Rivoluzione di Mondi - 1934 (exhibited at the Venice Biennale and destroyed immediately afterwards by Crali himself)
- Bombardamento Urbano - 1935
- Battaglia aerea I - 1936
- Aerocaccia II - 1936
- Volo Agitato - 1938
- Bombardamento di una fabbrica - 1938
- Architectura - 1939
- Incuneandosi nell'abitato - 1939 (also known as In tuffo sulla città, preserved at MART)
- Prima che si apra il paracadute - 1939 (at the modern art gallery in Udine)
- Assalto di motori - 1968
- Macchine in cielo - 1980
- Kamikaze - 1980
- Le Frecce Tricolori - 1987
- Monoplano Jonathan - 1988
