= Fillìa =

Italian artist (1904–1936)

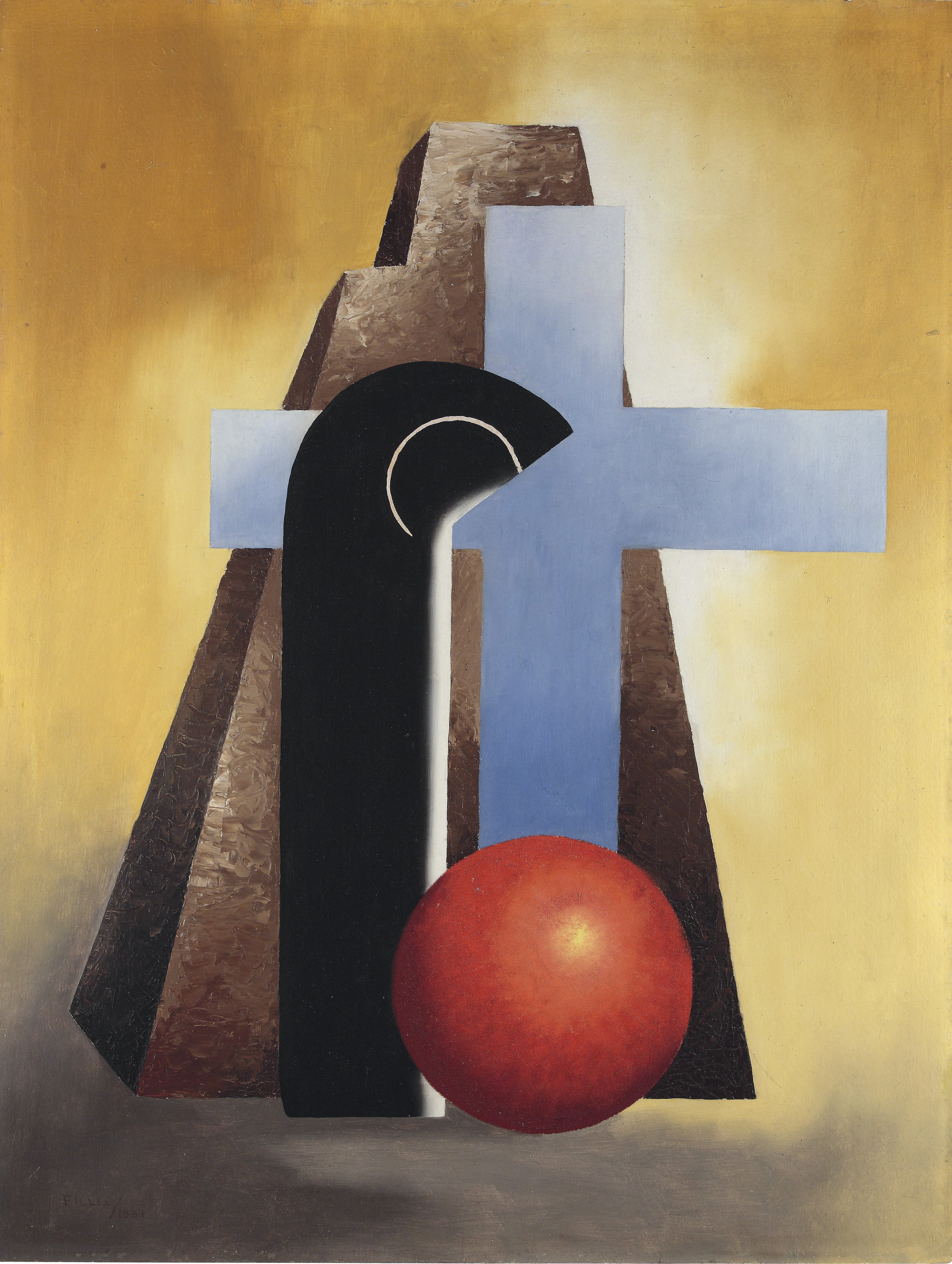
Fillia: L'Adorazione, 1931

Fillìa (3 October 1904 – 10 February 1936) was the name adopted by Luigi Colombo, an Italian artist associated with the second generation of Futurism. Aside from painting, his works included interior design, architecture, furniture and decorative objects.

== Biography ==
Fillìa was born in Revello, Piedmont.

He established the Futurist movement in Turin in 1923 at the age of 19 with a group which included Nikolay Diulgheroff, Pippo Oriani, Enrico Alimandi, Franco Costa and the sculptor Mino Rosso. Fillìa quickly became the leader of the group and its principal theorist. He published the art reviews: Futurismo (Futurism) (1924), Ventrina Futurista (1927), La Città Futurista (The Futurist City) (1929), La Città Nuova (The New City) (1930-1934), and Stile Futurista (Futurist Style) (1934–1935) with Enrico Prampolini. His work in the mid-1920s shows the influence of Prampolini. After 1928, Fillìa's work shows increasing subjectivity.

He became an exponent of L'Aeropittura (Aeropainting), the dominant Futurist style of the 1930s, which applied the experience of flight to the depiction of landscape aerially; the world was no longer seen from the perspective of the person on the ground but as if from an aeroplane. In 1929, he was a co-signatory of the Futurist manifesto L'Aeropittura, with Benedetta Cappa, Depero, Gerardo Dottori, Marinetti, Somenzi, Tato and Prampolini.

Fillìa was the co-author with Marinetti of the Manifesto of Futurist Cooking, published in the Turin newspaper, Gazzetta del Popolo, on 28 December 1930. This document presented the Futurist movement's objective of creating a synthesis of art with everyday life.

Enrico Crispolti says that Fillìa and his colleagues in Turin explored an interior, psychological and subjective world, unlike other Futurists of the period, such as Prampolini and Depero. Fillìa had recourse to an "airy body", a “synthesis of movement, of the organic aspect, of the emotions of flight". The ectoplasmic forms which appear in Fillìa's paintings of the late twenties and early thirties contrast with the rigidity of his earlier work and were taken up to explore the subconscious. His interest in the spiritual aspects of art turned to specifically religious painting from 1930 to 1933. He had large exhibitions at Padua (1931), La Spezia (1932) and Florence (1933). In 1932, he co-authored the Manifesto of Sacred Futurist Art with Marinetti. Fillìa was also fascinated with machines. In his mechanical paintings produced during the 1920s, they were linked to his interest in the occult, so that they are venerated as vehicles to transcend mundane reality. He supported Prampolini's conceptualization of the machine as a psychological unifying force within the human conscience alongside work and labour.

He had an interest in architecture, designing the Futurist Pavilion at the 1928 International Exhibition in Turin. He designed the mosaic decorations of the Swimming Stadium and was executed by Ceramica Ligure. Fillìa's contribution to architecture is evident in his editorial activities such as his influential monographs, La nouva architettura, and his essays on modern architecture. He also developed the notion of "ambientazione", which included the spiritual and technical fashioning of living environments.

Fillìa's activities as an organiser and polemicist, which he continued through his contact with the avant-garde in his numerous trips to Paris, ended with his death at Turin in 1936 at the age of thirty-two.

There are works by Fillìa in the collections of the Galleria d'Arte Moderna in Rome, the Galleria d'Arte Moderna in Turin, and in a number of private collections. His Works Senza titolo, 1923, is by Museo Cantonale d'Arte of Lugano.
