= Giuseppe Caselli =

Italian painter (1893–1976)

- Born: 5 July 1893; Luzzara, Emilia-Romagna, Kingdom of Italy
- Died: 19 December 1976 (aged 83); La Spezia, Liguria, Italy
- Occupation: Painter

Giuseppe Ugo Caselli (5 July 1893 – 19 December 1976) was an Italian painter.

Caselli was born in Luzzara (Emilia-Romagna). When he was young, he was student of Felice Del Santo and Antonio Discovolo. In 1913, he became acquainted with Lorenzo Viani. During World War I, Caselli was captured and interned in a concentration camp in Austria. After that, he studied at the Academy of Fine Arts in Florence, at the "free school of the nude".

His painting style is situated between the first divisionists expressions of the early twentieth century, and a personal expressionism, close to the Austrian groundbreaking movements, but also influenced by the poetry of his friend Viani, with his entire repertoire of characters suffering and desperate.

With aeropittura ("aeropainting") works, technique derived from futurism, Caselli participated in 1933 in the Premio del Golfo (Gulf Award), organized by Filippo Tommaso Marinetti. Being very linked to La Spezia, Caselli dedicated his painting to portray the life of the city and the province, and specially, the life in the Cinque Terre.

== Death ==
Caselli died in La Spezia, on 19 December 1976, aged 83.
