= Barbara (painter) =

Italian painter

Olga Biglieri
- "Barbara"
- Born: 15 March 1915; Mortara
- Died: 2002 (aged 86–87); Rome
- Spouse: Ignazio Scurto
- Children: Three

Olga Biglieri Scurto, known under the pseudonym Barbara (15 March 1915 – 10 January 2002), was an Italian Futurist painter and aviator. She was one of three women involved with the movement and in particular with Aeropittura. (The others being Marisa Mori and Benedetta Cappa).

== Life ==
Biglieri was born in Mortara, Lombardy on 15 March 1915. She grew up in the countryside around Novara, where her father owned a farm. She started to paint at the age of eleven and also trained to be a pilot. After learning how to glide, she took a proper pilot license at the Aeroclub di Cameri at the age of just sixteen.

Biglieri became associated with Futurism when Filippo Tommaso Marinetti, who was the movement's founder, saw her paintings by chance in a shop window.

Biglieri chose to work under the name of Barbara and to combine her two passions by including images of planes in her Aeropittura paintings. Her 1939 painting Aeropittura di città was included in the 22nd Venice Biennale. That painting's main subject is a plane but her composition fades into two dimensional shapes. Her paintings are of significance as they are a testimony of how female aeropainters found a place in the classic man/machine futurist image, and to create the parallel concept of "superdonna" or woman/machine.

In 1939 she married the poet and writer Ignazio Scurto. When Scurto was drafted in 1943, Biglieri had to care for their children during the Second World War. Her husband died in 1954. Following a long period of pause, where she retired in Val d'Ossola to write children's books, Biglieri worked as a fashion journalist. In the early 1960s she hosted a popular radio show on Rai Radio 1, Stella Polare, where she gave fashion tips.

Biglieri's interest in art was rekindled by a meeting with Swedish artist Gosta Liljestrom in 1964. In 1986 her sculpture Peace Tree was permanently installed in the garden of the Hiroshima Peace Memorial Museum.

In 1998 she was the subject of an autobiography written by Francesca Brezzi, Quando il futurismo è donna: Barbara dei colori.

Biglieri died in Rome in 2002.

== Legacy ==
In 2009 one of her works was included in an exhibition in at Casa Italiana Zerilli-Marimò in New York.

In 2015 Novara named a street after her.
