= Růžena Zátková =

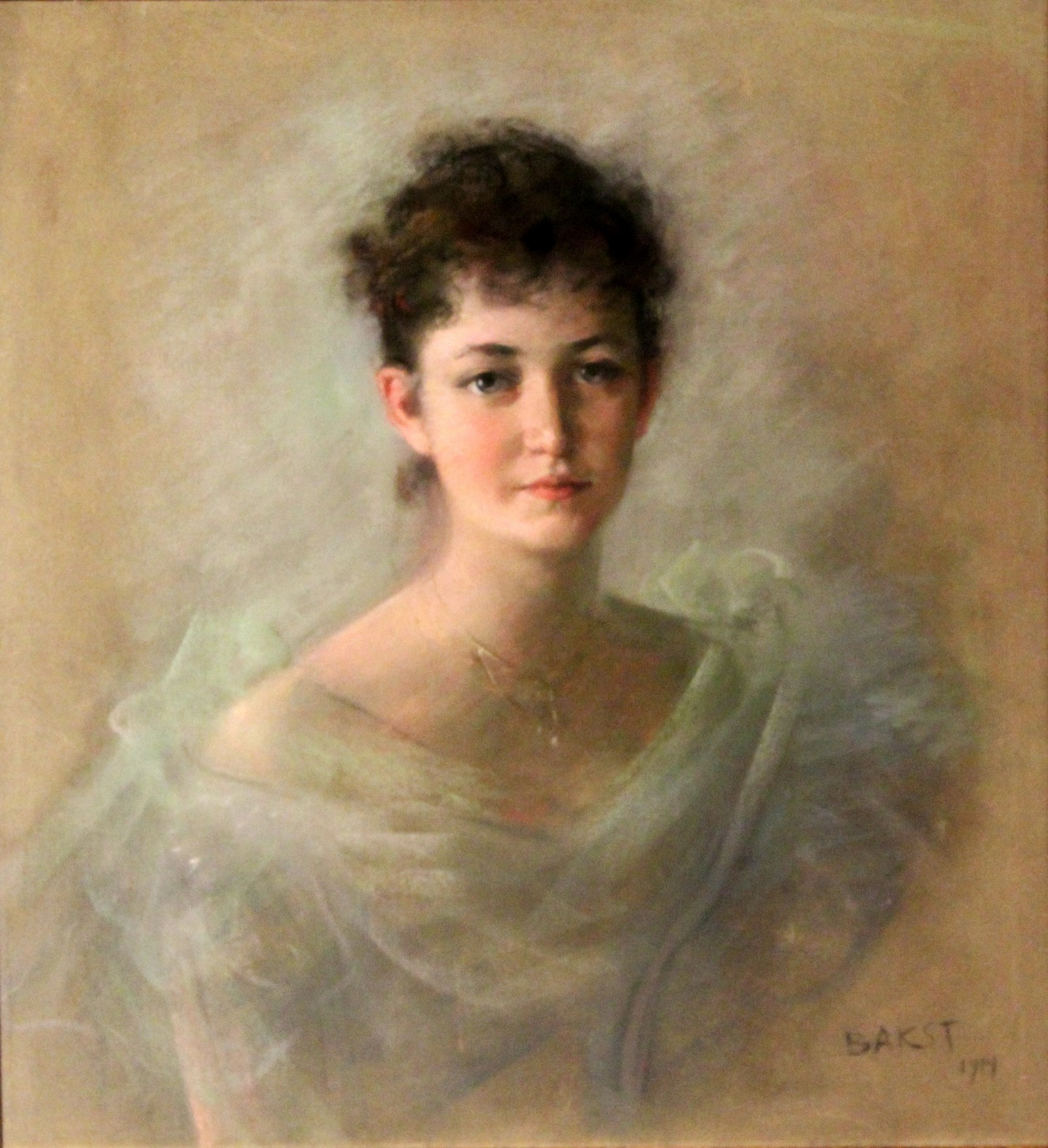
- Růžena Zátková by Léon Bakst (1914)
- Born: 15 March 1885; Kamenný Újezd, Bohemia, Austria-Hungary
- Died: 29 October 1923 (aged 38); Leysin, Switzerland

Signature
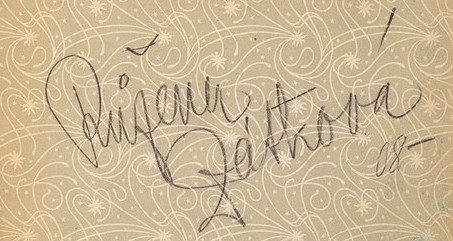

Růžena Zátková (also called Rougina Zatkova; 15 March 1885 – 29 October 1923) was a Czech painter and sculptor. She has been regarded as the "only authentic Czech futurist." As a result of her Bohemian heritage and her decade-long residency in Rome, Růžena Zátková became an important artistic link between Russian and Italian Futurism. Zátková is considered one of the pioneers of kinetic art.

== Biography ==
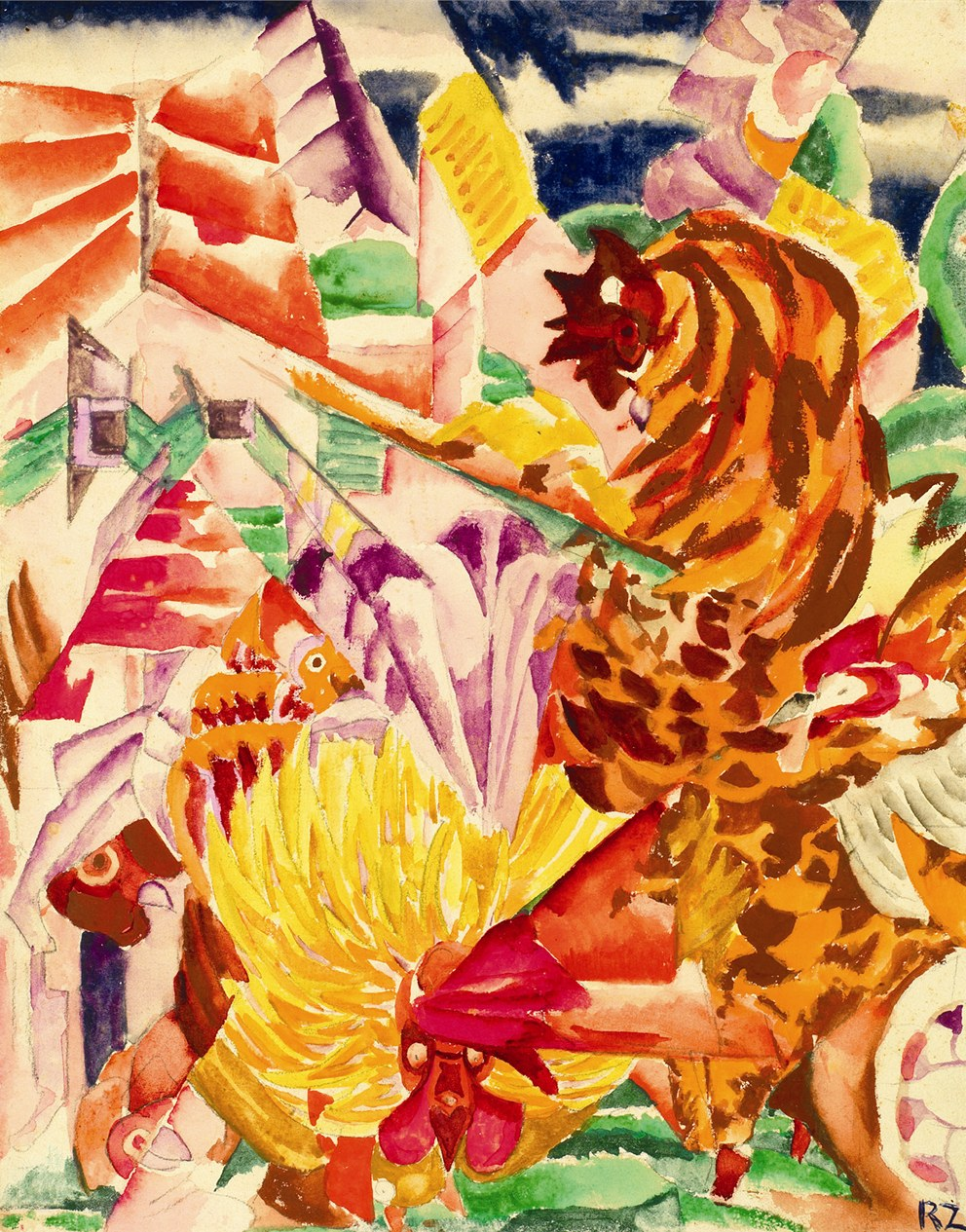
Roosters from Bricca (1922)

Born in 1885 to an upper-middle class family in Bohemia, Růžena Zátková was one of five sisters. Her mother, an accomplished pianist, encouraged her five daughters to pursue education in the arts. Zátková studied music in Prague and also studied under the painter Antonín Slavíček at his private school. She later attended drawing classes in Munich.

In 1910, Zátková married the Russian diplomat Basilo Kwoshinky and began to live with him in a large house outside of Rome. However, due to Kwoshinky's impotence and homosexuality, the marriage was never consummated. Zátková described herself as "married and not married," as the couple never officially separated but instead lived apart for the rest of their lives. The collapse of Zátková's marriage left the artist free to travel and practice her trade. She moved to Rome, where she met Arturo Cappa, the brother of futurist artist Benedetta Cappa, and began "an intense love affair" with him that would become lifelong. In this part of her life, Zátková never stopped painting, although her early work consists mostly of Impressionistic landscapes and portraits.

Both Zátková and Benedetta Cappa studied under Giacomo Balla, and Zátková has been cited as an influence on Cappa's artistic style. In 1915, Zátková participated in an "Evening of Noisemaking" at the Milan home of Filippo Tommaso Marinetti, the author of the first Futurist Manifesto. Her attendance at this event marked Zátková's public entrance into Marinetti's circle of Italian futurists. By 1915, her artistic style had come into its most mature form, and she began to express the dynamism and ferocity that would come to define her work. Zátková acted as a bridge between Italian and Russian artistic movements, and her exhibitions in Italy “merged Central European and Slavic elements into the stream of the Italian avant-garde experimentation." Her career reached a peak in 1922 after an exhibition of the majority of her body of work at the Casa d'Arte Bragalia in Rome. In the booklet for this exhibition, painter Enrico Prampolini praised her work, and described her sculptures as possessing a "superb virility".

However, the last years of Zátková's life were largely unfortunate, marked both by illness and the exile of Arturo Cappa to France. After a history of poor health, Růžena Zátková died of tuberculosis in 1923 at the age of 38.

== Artistic legacy ==
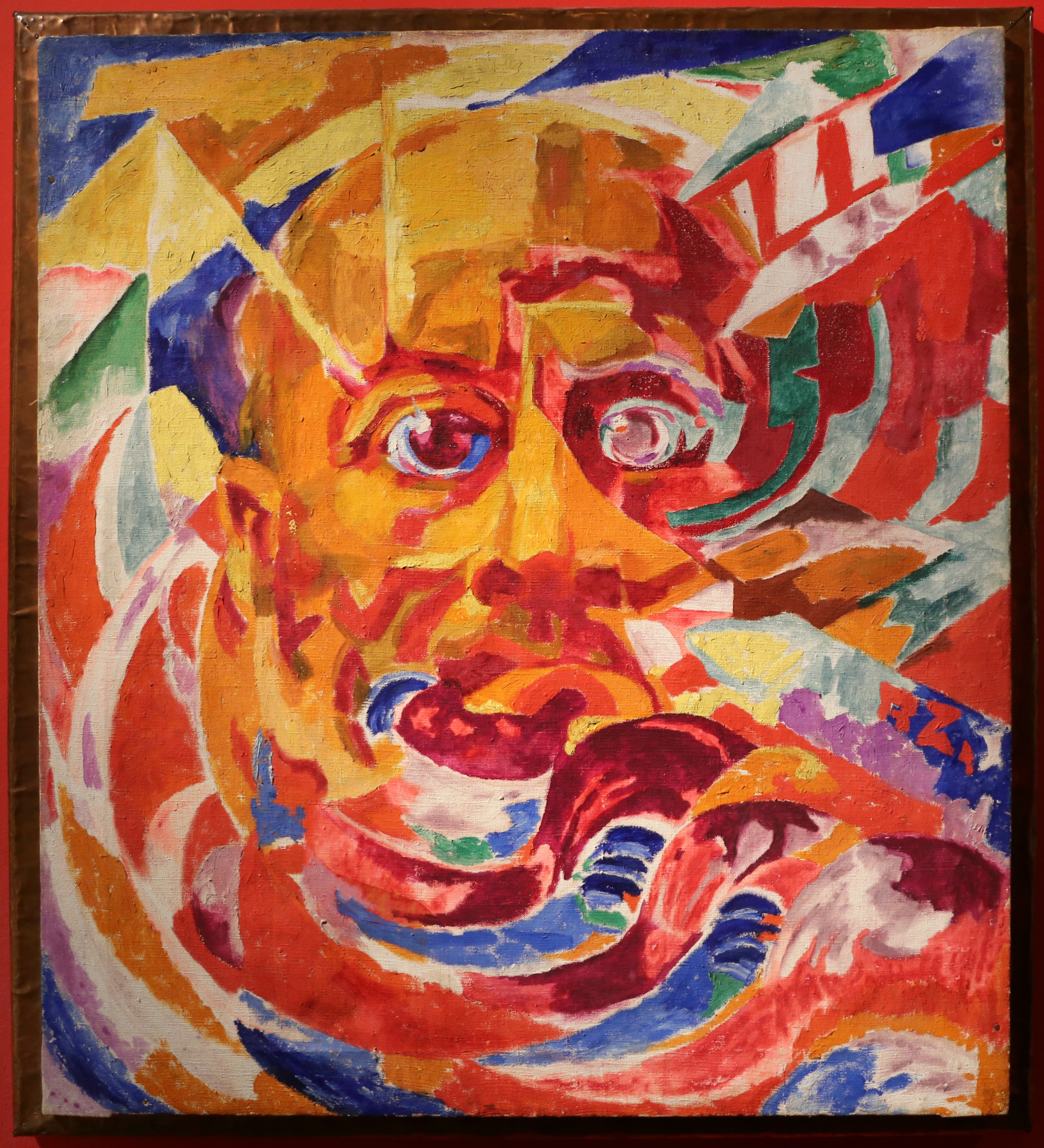
Růžena Zátková's Marinetti, an Orphism-influenced portrait of Filippo Tommaso Marinetti, was created between the years 1915 and 1921. Because Zátková never dated any of her works, a precise date of production is unknown.

Inspired by Giacomo Balla's artistic use of movement and speed, Růžena Zátková's works are considered pioneering examples of kinetic art. Her works have been described as lacking "shyness" and possessing a "fiery" sense of momentum. Zátková was also inspired by Primitivism, and her works often include motifs stemming from the folk art traditions of her homeland. Zátková was a close friend of the founders of Neo-Primitivism, Michail Larionov and Natalia Goncharova; they first met in 1915, when Sergei Diaghilev invited them to stay with him and the Ballets Russes at a Swiss villa he had recently rented. In 1916, when Zátková was ill with tuberculosis, Goncharova dedicated two gouaches to her, which were both rediscovered in 2019.

Zátková never dated any of her works, and the creation of a definitive timeline of her career has proved difficult. Many of Zátková's works have gone missing under mysterious circumstances (including the large lot of artworks left to Arturo Cappa after her death), and a re-examination of her decade-long involvement in the Italian futurist movement is required. In 2011, a reproduction of her missing kinetic sculpture The Pile Driver was displayed at an exhibition in Prague. Two of Zátková's paintings, Marinetti and Water Running Under Ice and Snow, were displayed alongside works by Giacomo Balla and Umberto Boccioni in a 2014 exhibition at the Solomon R. Guggenheim Museum.
