= Aeropittura =

20th-century Italian art movement

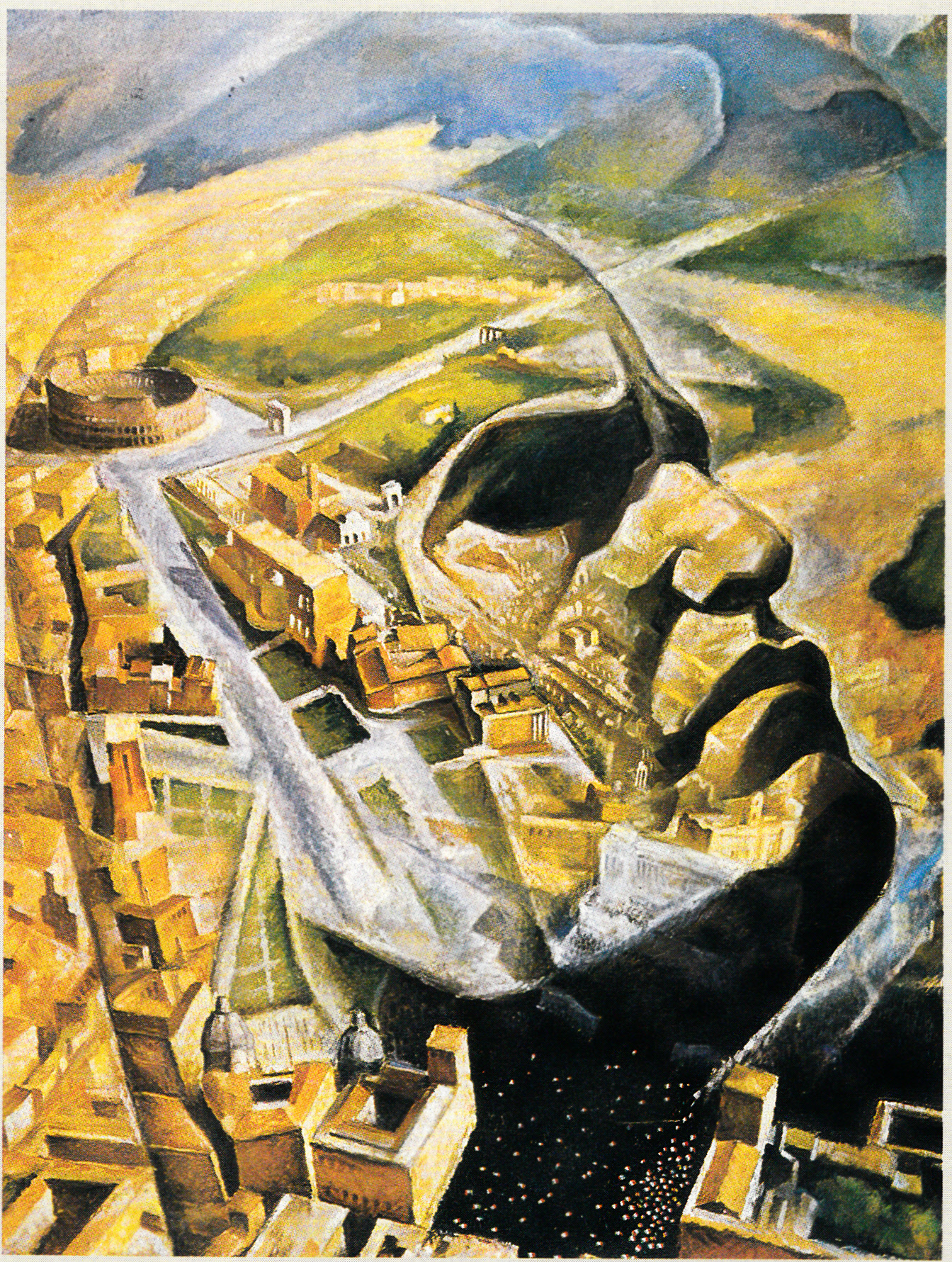
Aeroritratto di Mussolini aviatore, Alfredo Ambrosi, 1930

Aeropittura (Aeropainting) was a major expression of the second generation of Italian Futurism, from 1929 through the early 1940s. The technology and excitement of flight, directly experienced by most aeropainters, offered aeroplanes and aerial landscape as new subject matter.

Aeropainting was varied in subject matter and treatment, including realism (especially in works of propaganda), abstraction, dynamism, quiet Umbrian landscapes, portraits of Benito Mussolini (e.g., Dottori's Portrait of il Duce), devotional religious paintings, and decorative art.

== Origins ==
Aeropainting was launched in a manifesto of 1929, Perspectives of Flight, signed by Benedetta Cappa, Fortunato Depero, Gerardo Dottori, Fillìa, Filippo Tommaso Marinetti, Enrico Prampolini, Mino Somenzi and Guglielmo Sansoni (Tato). The artists stated that "The changing perspectives of flight constitute an absolutely new reality that has nothing in common with the reality traditionally constituted by a terrestrial perspective" and that "Painting from this new reality requires a profound contempt for detail and a need to synthesise and transfigure everything." Art critic / historian Enrico Crispolti identifies three main "positions" in aeropainting: "a vision of cosmic projection, at its most typical in Prampolini's 'cosmic idealism' ... ; a 'reverie' of aerial fantasies sometimes verging on fairy-tale (for example in Dottori ...); and a kind of aeronautical documentarism that comes dizzyingly close to direct celebration of machinery (particularly in Tullio Crali, but also in Tato and Ambrosi)."

== Artists ==
Eventually there were over a hundred aeropainters. The most able were Balla, Depero, Prampolini, Dottori and Crali.

Fortunato Depero was the co-author with Balla of The Futurist Reconstruction of the Universe, (1915) a radical manifesto for the revolution of everyday life. He practised painting, design, sculpture, graphic art, illustration, interior design, stage design and ceramics. The decorative element comes to the fore in Depero's later painting, e.g. Train Born from the Sun (1924). He applied this approach in theatre design and commercial art - e.g. his unrealised designs for Stravinsky's Chant du Rossignol, (1916) his large tapestry, The Court of the Big Doll (1920) and his many posters.

Enrico Prampolini pursued a programme of abstract and quasi-abstract painting, combined with a career in stage design. His Spatial-Landscape Construction (1919) is quasi-abstract with large flat areas in bold colours, predominantly red, orange, blue and dark green. His Simultaneous Landscape (1922) is totally abstract, with flat colours and no attempt to create perspective. In his Umbrian Landscape (1929), produced in the year of the Aeropainting Manifesto, Prampolini returns to figuration, representing the hills of Umbria. But by 1931 he had adopted "cosmic idealism", a biomorphic abstractionism quite different from the works of the previous decade, for example in Pilot of the Infinite (1931) and Biological Apparition (1940).

Gerardo Dottori made a specifically Futurist contribution to landscape painting, which he frequently shows from an aerial viewpoint. Some of his landscapes appear to be more conventional than Futurist, e.g. his Hillside Landscape (1925). Others are dramatic and lyrical, e.g. The Miracle of Light (1931-2), which employs his characteristic high viewpoint over a schematised landscape with patches of brilliant colour and a non-naturalistic perspective reminiscent of pre-Renaissance painting; over the whole are three rainbows, in non-naturalistic colour. More typically Futurist is his major work, the Velocity Triptych of 1925.

Dottori was one of the principal exponents of Futurist sacred art. His painting of St. Francis Dying at Porziuncola has a strong landscape element and a mystical intent conveyed by distortion, dramatic light and colour.

Mural painting was embraced by the Futurists in the Manifesto of Mural Plasticism at a time when the revival of fresco painting was being debated in Italy. Dottori carried out many mural commissions including the Altro Mondo in Perugia (1927-8) and the hydroport at Ostia (1928).

Tullio Crali, a self-taught painter, was a late adherent to Futurism, not joining until 1929. He is noted for his realistic aeropaintings, which combine "speed, aerial mechanisation and the mechanics of aerial warfare". His earliest aeropaintings represent military planes, Aerial Squadron and Aerial Duel (both 1929), in appearance little different from works by Prampolini or other Futurist painters. In the 1930s, his paintings became realistic, intending to communicate the experience of flight to the viewer. His best-known work, Nose Dive on the City (1939), shows an aerial dive from the pilot's point of view, the buildings below drawn in dizzying perspective. Crali continued to produce aero-themed paintings into the 1980s.

== List of artists ==
- Fedele Azari
- Giacomo Balla
- "Barbara"
- Uberto Bonetti
- Benedetta Cappa
- Giuseppe Caselli
- Nino Costa
- Tullio Crali
- Giulio D'Anna
- Fortunato Depero
- Gerardo Dottori
- Mino Delle Site
- Leandra Angelucci Cominazzini
- Fillìa
- Sante Monachesi
- Marisa Mori
- Pippo Oriani
- Osvaldo Peruzzi
- Ugo Pozzo
- Enrico Prampolini
- Aldo Righetti
- Mino Rosso
- Mino Somenzi
- Tato
- Thayaht
