= Jules Maincave =

French Futurist chef

- Maincave in 1913
- Died: 30 October 1916; Somme, France
- Cause of death: Killed in action
- Culinary career
- Cooking style: Futurist cooking

Jules Maincave was a French chef belonging to the Futurist movement, active in the early 20th century in Paris.

Maincave decried cooking in the tradition of Escoffier, asserting that its reliance on a set repertoire of dishes and flavor combinations had "paralysed taste buds". Styling himself as the first Futurist cook, Maincave argued for combining food in unusual combinations, such as camembert with sardines or lamb with crayfish sauce, and supported the use of flower essences as seasonings. Maincave was interviewed in a series of newspaper pieces during 1913, and he published a culinary manifesto. He died three years later in the Battle of the Somme, while working as a regiment cook. He was not yet 30 years old.

A translation of Maincave's manifesto was published in Italy in 1927 by Filippo Tommaso Marinetti, the founder of the Futurist movement. While his efforts received praise from several figures during the 20th century, today he is little remembered outside of niche cooking circles.

== Biography ==
Jules Maincave's father was a cook. As a young chef, Maincave worked in the kitchens of large hotels, where he was exposed to the different food preferences of diners from different countries.

Maincave was among the earliest members of the Futurist movement interested in expanding focus beyond questions of art. By the early 1910s, Maincave was operating a restaurant in Paris, situated on the Grands Boulevards. He cooked according to a philosophy of rejecting tradition, spurning the dictates of classical French cooking in the pedigree of Escoffier. He was associated with Filippo Tommaso Marinetti, the founder of the Futurist movement, who Maincave cited as a mentor. His patrons, according to a piece published in the New York Times following Maincave's death, were "artists who worked with brush and chisel and not as he did with vegetables and meat".

Maincave rose to public view in 1913, when he declared himself the first Futurist cook. In an extended interview with André Charpentier in a June issue of the newspaper L'Intransigeant, he stated:

The art of cooking has been stuck in a rut, recycling a dozen recipes which, like the dog described in the scriptures, “come back” again and again. .... The way food is prepared today is stupid, boring and irrational. The only way for Futurist cooks to reinvigorate cookery is to begin with a clean slate. We will banish all existing constraints and begin by attacking the two cornerstones of modern cookery: the way foods are combined and the way they are seasoned. Let’s start with the way foods are combined. (Note: L'art culinaire se traîne lamentablement autour d'une douzaine de recettes et y revient toujours... comme le chien dont parle l'Écriture. [...] La façon actuelle d'accommoder les mets est stupide et routinière. Elle est fondée sur des principes irrationnels. Mon plan de réforme fait table rase de toutes les servitudes culinaires actuelles. J'attaque tout d'abord les deux formidables Bastilles de la cuisine moderne : les mélanges et les arômes. Parlons des mélanges.)

Such long established combinations Maincave rejected following included making sauces from oil and vinegar, conventions which had "paralysed taste buds". Instead, Maincave proposed diners try such combinations as camembert with sardines; lamb and crayfish sauce; and "whipped cream with tomatoes doused with brandy". Such pairings may initially disgust and shock the system, Maincave said, but once palates had been "re-educated", people would come to appreciate what they were eating, their taste buds revitalised. Which foods were acceptable as seasonings and condiments too, needed rethinking according to Maincave, believing essences of flowers such as rose, lily of the valley, and verbena offered cooks exciting possibilities. He credited his father with the idea for using perfume as seasoning.

Maincave pictured in 1913 in Fantasio magazine

Expanded with context on Maincave's biography, the interview was published in the New York Times the following week under the title "Futurist Cookery". In September 1913, Maincave was again interviewed by Charpentier, this time for Fantasio magazine. Therein, his piece Manifeste de la Cuisine Futuriste was printed. It protested that:

Kitchens are stinking cells, dark laboratories where disgusting roux are prepared, cavernous spaces full of infection where suspicious characters stir insipid and sickening mixtures that they then ladle out regularly to millions of gaping mouths without ever satisfying their appetites!

And attested that as Futurists,

We are striving to create a cuisine in perfect accord with the comforts of the modern world and with the most recent scientific discoveries.... The Futurist kitchen will be moved from the basement to the upper floors of the house. The kitchen should be filled with daylight and fresh air! kitchens should be thought of as artist studios. light is essential, certain dishes should only be prepared at noon, others in the evening, some as the sun is setting.

The manifesto, credited solely to Maincave, was likely prepared with the assistance of Marinetti, who often worked with people on writing Futurist manifestos. A translation of Manifeste de la Cuisine Futuriste was printed in a newspaper the following year in Italy.

=== Death ===
In 1914, World War I broke out in Europe. Maincave was enlisted and sent to the front lines in the ninetieth regiment of the French infantry, where he was appointed regiment cook. He was killed near Combles on 30 October 1916 during the Battle of the Somme, when his kitchen was hit with an enemy shell. He died before reaching the age of 30. He was not listed as Mort pour la France, which has produced some speculation that Maincave may not have existed, perhaps instead being an alter-ego of Charpentier. (Note: People were not always listed among the Mort pour la France.)

In retrospective reporting in The New York Times, Maincave was reported to have continued his culinary experimentation in his wartime role, "he created dishes that were the envy of every other company in the line". His commitment to food was reported to have contributed to his death, as a desire to position the kitchen closer to the soldiers being fed meant his kitchen was positioned outside of where it was safe.

== Legacy ==
Maincave's death was reported in the New York Times in 1921 in the article "‘Latin Quarter Chef Among War Heroes. Visitors Returning to Paris Have Just Learned of the Fate of Jules Maincave." That decade, the Italian Futurists first became interested in extending their approach to cooking through what came to be known as Futurist cooking, though they did not initially reference Maincave in their writings on the subject. This changed in 1927, when Marinetti published a translation he had completed of Manifeste de la Cuisine Futuriste, accompanied with comment from Marinetti praising Maincave as a chef. Following which the Futurists came to focus more on food as a subject worthy of serious attention. Unlike Maincave, who was interested fundamentally in the experience of taste, the Italian Futurists tried to create experiences that would involve each of the five senses.

Their efforts were reviewed critically by Prosper Montagné, the French author of Larousse Gastronomique. In an article published in 1931, Montagné asked "is there anything new about the cooking described in the Italian manifesto? … [Its] author seems to think of himself as the new Jules Maincave. His ideas are less extreme than Maincave’s and, let’s be clear, he doesn’t really know as much about cooking as he who, in France around 1912, tried to modernize our cuisine."

Some attention came to Maincave in France towards the end of the century. One of these was an article in 1973 in Gault Millau, praising Maincave as a genius, ahead of his time, and the first to challenge the classic methods of French cooking, and another in 1989 from Le Monde, which suggested Maincave should be among those considered candidates for "cook of the century". Today, he is mostly unknown in France outside of niche culinary circles.

== Sample recipe ==
Despite not publishing a cookbook, Maincave supplied several recipes to journalists. One, for "Filet de Boeuf Fantasio", read:

Time to prepare: from 10 a.m. to 12 noon.
Recommended drink: a tablespoon of cognac in a glass of water.
Cook a nice fillet of beef.
Cut into thin slices and place them on a serving dish with rum.
Leave to soak for ten minutes then light.
Treat the flaming beef as you would a classic rum omelette.
Finely chop small grilled mackerels.
Mix the chopped mackerel with jelly … preferably redcurrant.
Serve hot.

== Sources ==
- Beaugé, Bénédict (2013). Plats du Jour: Sur l'Idée de Nouveauté en Cuisine. Éditions Métailié. ISBN 978-2-86424-906-1.
- Charpentier, André (15 June 1913). "Le Futurisme à la Cuisine: Un «chef» se propose de révolutionner l'art culinaire". L'Intransigeant (in French). p. 2.
- Hyman, Philip (June 2019). "Jules Maincave: The First Futurist Cook". Petits Propos Culinaires. 114: 16–27. doi:10.1558/ppc.28061.
- Mark, Sean (2019). ""Recipes for the Kitchens of the Future": The Futurist Art of Feeding". In Martell, Jessica; Fajardo, Adam; Keel Geheber, Philip (eds.). Modernism and Food Studies: Politics, Aesthetics, and the Avant-Garde. Gainesville, Florida: University Press of Florida. ISBN 978-0-8130-5249-6.
