= Futurist cooking =

Avant-garde Italian Futurist cuisine

Futurist meals comprised a cuisine and style of dining advocated by some members of the Futurist movement, particularly in Italy. These meals were first proposed in Filippo Tommaso Marinetti and Luigi Colombo (Fillìa)'s Manifesto of Futurist Cooking, published in Turin's Gazzetta del Popolo on December 28, 1930. In 1932, Marinetti and Fillìa expanded upon these concepts in The Futurist Cookbook.

== Concept ==
According to Marinetti, he developed his concept of Futurism on October 11, 1908, while he was pondering the liberation of the Italian lyrical genius. He concluded that, for this to happen, it is necessary to change the method by going down into the streets, attacking the theaters, and by bringing "the fist into the midst of the artistic struggle." Futurist cooking was directed at combining gastronomy and art, as well as the transformation of dining into a performance art. Futurism recognized that people "think, dream and act according to what they eat and drink" so cooking and eating needed to become inferior to the proper aesthetic experience that Futurism favored. It has been associated with the notion of avant-garde in the sense that Futurist banquets are seen as great performances. Futurist food is also considered a means to address political and social issues. Marinetti's Manifesto has been described as a satirical polemic more than a cooking manual and was published in response to the Italian economic needs during the Depression.

Futurist cuisine notably rejected pasta, believing it to cause lassitude, pessimism and lack of passion. This was seen as a novel way to strengthen the Italian race in preparation for war. The historian Carol Helstosky explains that "the Futurist proposal to abolish pasta was intended to transform Italians from pasta-eating brigands and mandolin players to modern, active citizens. The abolition of pasta would also reduce Italy’s dependence on foreign wheat supplies." This was in accordance with Benito Mussolini's Battle for Grain campaign, begun in 1925. Another idea in the Manifesto establishes that perfect meals require two elements: originality and harmony in table setting. Futurists maintain that these include all implements, food aesthetics and tastes, and absolute originality in the food. Marinetti also stressed the importance of sculpted foods, including meats whose main appeal is to the eye and imagination. This was demonstrated in the case of the "Equator + North Pole" edible food sculpture by Enrico Prampolini, which involved a cone of firmly whipped egg whites adorned with orange segments that resembled the rays of the sun and set on an equatorial sea of poached egg yolks. In futurist cooking, the knife and fork are also abolished, while perfumes are added to enhance the taste experience.

The Manifesto of Futurist Cooking also proposed that the way in which meals were served be fundamentally changed. For example:

- Some food on the table would not be eaten, but only experienced by the eyes and nose
- Food would arrive rapidly and contain many flavors, but only a few mouthfuls in size
- All political discussion and speeches would be forbidden
- Music and poetry would be forbidden except during certain intervals

One of the proposed settings for these "perfect meals" incorporated the Futurist love of machinery. The diners would eat in a mock aircraft, whose engines' vibrations would stimulate the appetite. The tilted seats and tables would "shake out" the diners' pre-conceived notions, while their taste buds would be overwhelmed by highly original dishes listed on aluminium cards.

Traditional kitchen equipment would be replaced by scientific equipment, bringing modernity and science to the kitchen. Suggested equipment included:

- Ozonizers—to give food the smell of ozone
- Ultraviolet ray lamps—to activate vitamins and other "active properties"
- Electrolyzers—to decompose items into new forms and properties
- Colloidal mills—to pulverize any food item
- Autoclaves, dialyzers, atmospheric and vacuum stills—to cook food without destroying vitamins
- Chemical indicators or analyzers—to help the cook determine if sauces need more salt, sugar, or vinegar

== Relationship with fascism ==
By the time Marinetti published La Cucina Futurista in 1932, a rift had developed between the Futurist movement and fascism, as evidenced by their contrasting orientation towards cuisine; the Futurists advocated for new methods of cooking, broadening the sensory experience, while Fascism worked to consolidate and spread classic "Italian" cuisine to the masses as a means of producing a modern and unified nation-state. Futurist cooking emphasized presentation and multisensory impression, revelling in transgression and shock value. As the historian Carol Helstosky demonstrates, "food sculptures and seemingly odd food pairings (meat and cologne or mussels and vanilla creme) heightened the tactile and sensory experience of the meal." Furthermore, the controversy generated by the anti-pasta campaign and the bizarre recipes in La Cucina Futurista succeeded in generating media attention for Futurism at a time when the movement had been in decline, by directly addressing Italian food supply and consumption, concerns which had become central to the political agenda of Fascism during the 1920s.

Mussolini's "Battle for Grain" was inaugurated in 1925 as part of a broader goal of autarky, or self-reliance of the Italian food system by increasing domestic food production and reducing or eliminating food imports. According to Helstosky, "Italy’s mounting debt and growing dependence on external powers for subsistence" had become untenable by the end of World War I, and thus "food performed a great deal of cultural and political 'work' under fascism." The ideological differences between Fascism and Futurism had grown as Fascism negotiated a compromise with the middle-class and embraced tradition while Marinetti and the Futurists continued their evangelism for the new.

Nonetheless, there were still important areas of convergence, particularly the shared embrace of aluminium. According to Daniele Conversi, a researcher in nationalism studies, "Aluminum was the futurist material par excellence: it was shiny, modern and entirely produced in Italy." For the latter reason, Fascism too had embraced the material as Italy's national metal, which continues to be central to Italian identity due to its relationship with the preparation of coffee. Caffeine's properties as a stimulant made it a natural fit with both Fascist and Futurist ideologies, and Marinetti quite famously regularly introduced himself as "the caffeine of Europe."

== Reception ==
The Italian public was not won over by Marinetti's manifesto regarding cuisine. In fact, immediately following its publication the Italian press broke into uproar. Doctors were measured in their response, agreeing that habitual consumption of pasta was fattening and recommending a varied diet; but Giovanni De Riseis, the Duke of Bovino and mayor of Naples, was firmer in his views: "The angels in Paradise," he told a reporter, "eat nothing but vermicelli al pomodoro [fine spaghetti with tomato sauce]." Marinetti replied that this confirmed his suspicions about the monotony of Paradise.

The Futurists amused themselves and outraged the public by inventing preposterous new dishes, most of which were shocking due to their unusual combinations and exotic ingredients. For example, mortadella with nougat or pineapples with sardines. Marinetti wanted Italians to stop eating foreign food and to stop using foreign food words: a bar should be called quisibeve (literally, "here one drinks" in Italian), a sandwich should be called traidue (between-two), a maître d'hôtel a guidopalato (palate-guide), and so on. Elizabeth David, the cookery writer, comments that Marinetti's ideas about food contained a germ of common sense, but behind his jesting lay the Fascist obsession with nationalism. Marinetti wanted to prepare the Italians for war. "Spaghetti is no food for fighters," he declared.

== Influence ==
Futurist cooking has had a wide influence, and like other aspects of the movement, some manifestations of this influence would only be realized many decades later. La Cucina Futurista anticipated that science would play a growing role in food consumption and diet. Marinetti expected synthetic foods to redefine nutrition, correctly anticipating the important role played by food science. Futurism was, however, largely an artistic and cultural movement, and its influence in these areas is vast. The first Futurist restaurant, the Taverna del Santopalato, was opened in Turin at Via Vanchiglia 2, on March 8, 1931. Designed by Marinetti, Fillìa, and Nikolay Diulgheroff, its clean and minimalist interior, marked by a prevailing use of aluminium, was in stark contrast to the traditional Italian dining experience, anticipating future restaurant design. It has also been suggested that Marinetti's pioneering interest in food chemistry anticipated the molecular gastronomy of chefs like Ferran Adrià, or the incorporation of influences from contemporary art by chef Massimo Bottura. The influence of Futurist cooking also has had more mundane manifestations, including the tactile experience of finger food, the emergence of fusion cuisine, and the emphasis on presentation developed in food presentation. It has also been suggested that some of the autarkic ideals of Futurist cooking influenced Slow Food, an organization founded by Carlo Petrini in Italy in 1986.

== Example meals and dishes ==
- Italian Breasts in the Sunshine: A Futurist dessert that features almond paste topped with a strawberry, then sprinkled with fresh black pepper.
- Diabolical Roses: Deep-fried red rose heads in full bloom.
- Divorced Eggs: Hard boiled eggs are cut in half; their yolks are removed and put on a "poltiglia" (puree) of potatoes, and their whites on one of carrots.
- Milk in a Green Light: A large bowl of cold milk, a few teaspoons of honey, many black grapes, and several red radishes illuminated by a green light. The author suggest it be served with a "polibibita" or cocktail of mineral water, beer, and blackberry juice.
- Tactile Dinner: A multi-course meal featured in Marinetti's The Futurist Cookbook. Pajamas have been prepared for the dinner, each one covered with a different material such as sponge, cork, sandpaper, or felt. As the guests arrive, each puts on a pair of the pajamas. Once all have arrived and are dressed in pajamas, they are taken to an unlit, empty room. Without being able to see, each guest chooses a dinner partner according to their tactile impression. The guests then enter the dining room, which consists of tables for two, and discover the partner they have selected.
- Traidue: Two slices of rectangular bread, one slice is spread over with anchovy paste, and the other slice with chopped apple skins. Between the two slices of bread, the salami is sandwiched. The name is Italian for “between two.”

=== Sequence ===
Sequence is essential to traditional Italian meals, and thus Futurist cooking also manipulated expectations by inverting the order of course and other modifications:

The meal begins. The first course is a 'polyrhythmic salad,' which consists of a box containing a bowl of undressed lettuce leaves, dates and grapes. The box has a crank on the left side. Without using cutlery, the guests eat with their right hand while turning the crank with their left. This produces music to which the waiters dance until the course is finished.

The second course is 'magic food', which is served in small bowls covered with tactile materials. The bowl is held in the left hand while the right picks out balls made of caramel and filled with different ingredients such as dried fruits, raw meat, garlic, mashed banana, chocolate, or pepper. The guests cannot guess what flavor they will encounter next.

The third course is 'tactile vegetable garden,' which is a plate of cooked and raw green vegetables without dressing. The guest eats the vegetables without the use of their hands, instead burying their face in the plate of vegetables, feeling the sensation of the greens on their face and lips. Each time a guest raises their head to chew, the waiters spray their face with perfume.

== Critical reception ==
It is widely thought that most Futurist cooking was "disgusting".

== See also ==
- Jules Maincave

== Sources ==
- Apollinaire, Guillaume. Le gastro-astronomisme ou la cuisine nouvelle / Il gastro-astronomismo o la cucina nuova./ L'ami Méritarte / L'amico Méritarte, Venezia: Damocle Edizione 2018.
- Conversi, Daniele. "Art, Nationalism and War: Political Futurism in Italy (1909–1944)." Sociology Compass, January 2009. 3(1): 92 - 117.
- Cutini, Paola (20 February 2016). "Culinaria e il "Manifesto della Cucina futurista"". RAI. Retrieved 2 November 2021.
- Davidson, Alan. "Futurist meals," in Oxford Companion to Food. Oxford: Oxford UP, 1999: 327.
- Helstosky, Carol. "Recipe For The Nation: Reading Italian History Through La Scienza In Cucina And La Cucina Futurista." Food and Foodways, 11:2-3, (2003) 113–140.
- Ibba, Roberto, and Domenico Sanna. "Food and the Futurist ‘Revolution’. A Note." Journal of Interdisciplinary History of Ideas, 2016-04-01, Vol.4 (8)
- Marinetti, Filippo Tommaso, e Fillìa, (1932) La Cucina Futurista, (ed. Pietro Frassica). Milan: Viennepierre Edizioni, 2009.
- Marinetti, F.T. (1932) The Futurist Cookbook. Suzanne Brill, trans, Lesley Chamberlain, ed. New York: Penguin Classics, 2014.
- Novero, Cecilia. "Antidiets of the Avant-Garde: From Futurist Cooking to Eat Art." University of Minnesota Press, 2010.
- Schnapp, Jeffrey T. (2001). "The Romance of Caffeine and Aluminum". Critical Inquiry. 28: 244–269.
