= Sante Monachesi =

Italian painter

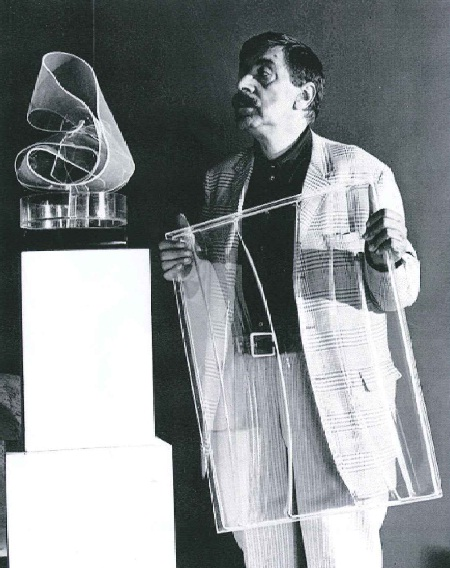
- Sante Monachesi
- Born: 1910; Macerata, Italy
- Died: 1991 (aged 80–81); Rome, Italy
- Education: Scuola romana, Expressionism
- Known for: Painting, Sculpture
- Notable work: Evelpiuma (1970) L'Attrice Americana (The American Actress, 1950); Paesaggio (Landscape, 1955); Nudo di Donna (Woman's Nude, 1955); Autoritratto (Self-portrait, 1944) Ritratto di F. T. Marinetti (1939)
- Movement: Contemporary, Futurism

Sante Monachesi (1910–1991), was an Italian painter belonging to the modern movement of the Scuola romana (Roman School) and founder in 1932 of the Movimento Futurista nelle Marche (Futurist Movement of Marche).

== Life and career ==
Monachesi studied at the Centro Sperimentale di Cinematografia (Experimental film centre or Italian National film school) in Rome. In the 1930s he embraced Futurism with spiralist and diagonal shapes both in painting and in sculpture, experimenting with aluminium in a mobile light.

An important representative of Aeropittura (Aeropainting), in 1936 he exhibited at Biennale di Venezia and in 1937 at the World Expo of Paris.

Immediately after World War II, Monachesi did expressionist and fauve painting, also as a member of the Scuola Romana, becoming part of the group of "Balduina" with David Grazioso and Ferdinando Bellorini, but it was especially in plastic sculpture that his research became innovative. He explored new materials and compositions, and on the occasion of the Moon landing, he founded the Agrà Movement, a futurist current looking at these exalting successes of technology and thus expresses in artwork the absence of gravity, the Zero-G that by subtracting from bodies their terrestrial weight, proposes to free man and art from all conditioning.

Monachesi's pieces in coloured methacrylate are truly dynamic action-sculptures: "... the artist moulds the transparent and fluorescent perpex sheet, and succeeds in capturing and freeing the void of the full figure it circumscribes," (Floriano de Santis, 1990). Perspex and evelpiume introduce two new materials into Art: rubber foam and polymethacrylate, neglected by the contemporary figurative language until 1959.

Monachesi introduced "nomadic sculptures", where the artist ties and melts the foam sheet, continuously creating new forms and shapes. They were defined "primary forms of matter and cosmos" by art critic Franco Passoni, well qualifies the Jesolo Exhibition of 1978, which Monachesi entitled To Tie & To Dissolve.

== Selected exhibitions ==
- Ancona 1970, Galleria dei Portici: "Sante Monachesi"
- Jesolo 1978, "Legare e sciogliere" (To Tie & To Dissolve)
- Milan 1982, Palazzo Reale Anni Trenta: "Arte e Cultura in Italia"
- Civitanova Marche 1999, Chiesa di S. Agostino: "Monachesi. Gli anni Quaranta e Cinquanta"
- Rome 2006, National Gallery of Modern Art: "Sante Monachesi – Perspex e Evelpiuma 1959–1969"

== Bibliography ==
- (in Italian) Franco Desideri (ed.), Architettura di Sante Monachesi, Margutta Duemila, Rome, 1958
- Emilio Villa, Giancarlo Politi, Sante Monachesi: Sculture, Alfieri, Bologna, 1965
- (in Italian) Emilio Villa (ed.), Sante Monachesi, Carte Segrete, Rome, 1970
- (in Italian) Emilio Villa, Elverio Maurizi, Monachesi, La Nuova Foglio, Pollenza, 1975
- (in Italian) Franco Cagnetta, Monachesi sconosciuto, Edizioni La Gradiva, Rome, 1977
- (in Italian) Franco Cagnetta (ed.), Monachesi, Edizioni La Gradiva, Rome, 1977
- (in Italian) Franco Cagnetta (ed.), Cento scritti di e su Monachesi, Edizioni La Gradiva, Rome, 1978
- (in Italian) Franco Cagnetta, Legare e sciogliere: l'Evelpiuma e l'universo agrà di Monachesi, Marsilio, Venice, 1978
- (in Italian) Simonetta Lux (ed.), Sante Monachesi, 1910–1991: l'insolenza, Giorgio Corbelli, Brescia, 1996
- (in Italian) Stefano Papetti (ed.), Luce Monachesi, Giorgio De Marchis, Monachesi: Gli anni Quaranta e Cinquanta, Federico Motta, Milan, 1999
- (in Italian) Maria Vittoria Marini Clarelli, Marina Gargiulo (eds.), Sante Monachesi: Perspex e Evelpiuma, 1959–1969, De Luca Editori d'Arte, Rome, 2007

== See also ==
- Scuola Romana
- Futurism
- Aeropittura (Aeropainting)
- Expressionism
- Fauvism

== Notes ==
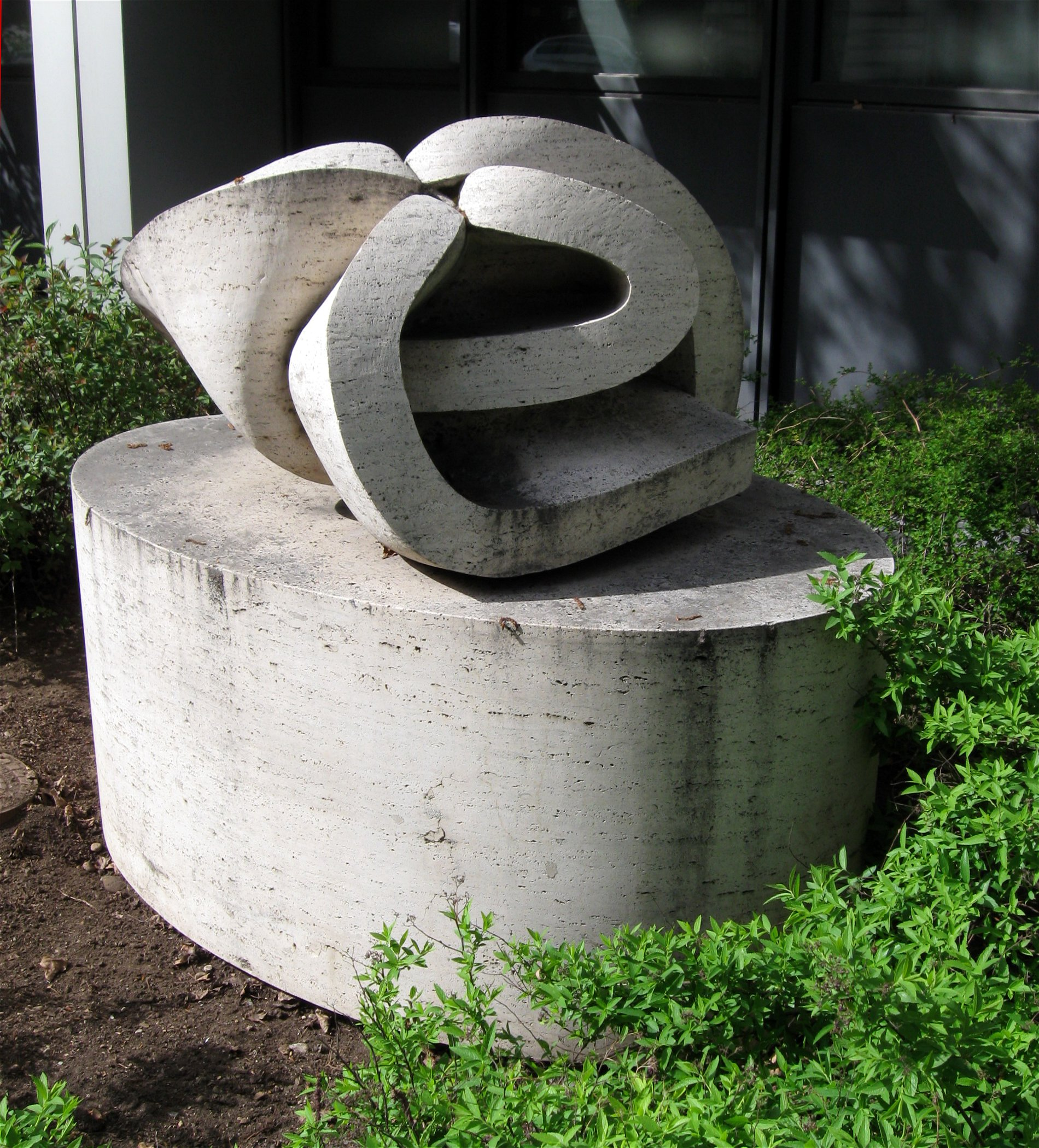
Da un Evelpiuma (From an Evelpiuma, 1970)
