= Gerardo Dottori =

Italian painter (1884–1977)

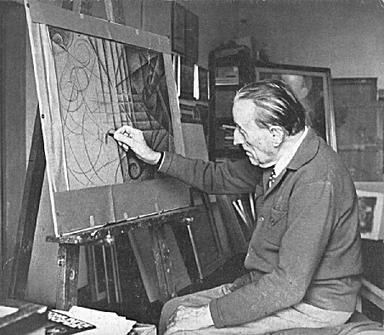
Gerardo Dottori in his studio

Gerardo Dottori (11 November 1884 – 13 June 1977) was an Italian Futurist painter. He signed the Futurist Manifesto of Aeropainting in 1929. He was associated with the city of Perugia most of his life, living in Milan for six months as a student and in Rome from 1926-39. Dottori's' principal output was the representation of landscapes and visions of Umbria, mostly viewed from a great height. Among the most famous of these are Umbrian Spring and Fire in the City, both from the early 1920s; this last one is now housed in the Museo civico di Palazzo della Penna in Perugia, with many of Dottori's other works. His work was part of the art competitions at the 1932 Summer Olympics and the 1936 Summer Olympics.

== Life ==
Dottori was born in Perugia to a working-class family. His mother died when he was eight years old. He was admitted as a young man to the Academy of Fine Arts in Perugia, and was employed at the same time by an antique dealer. In 1906 he worked as a decorator in Milan, where he was able to visit museums and exhibitions. He resumed his studies in 1908, mixing in avant-garde art circles in Florence. In 1910 he began work with the magazine Defense dell'Arte.

In 1911 he went to Rome where he met Giacomo Balla and became an adherent of Futurism. In 1912 he joined the first Futurist group in Umbria. In 1915 he fought in World War I, at the same time writing Parole in libertà ("Words in freedom") which he published under the name G. Voglio.

In 1920 he founded the Futurist magazine Griffa!. In the same year he had his first exhibition in Rome. In 1924 he participated in the Futurist Congress, where he had already acquired a certain notoriety, presenting his thesis on Rural Futurism. In the same year he exhibited at the Venice Biennale, the first Futurist to do so. In the course of his life he participated in ten Biennales.

From 1926 to 1939 he lived in Rome, contributing to various art magazines. In 1925 he exhibited at the Permanente and in 1927 at the Gallery Pesaro in the first of a series of Futurist exhibitions, including a one-man show in 1931.

His major contribution to Futurism was Aeropainting. He was one of the signatories of the 1929 Aeropainting Manifesto, signed also by Benedetta Cappa, Fortunato Depero, Fillìa, Filippo Tommaso Marinetti, Enrico Prampolini and others, who are among its major representatives. In 1932 he was one of the first Futurists to paint sacred subjects, following the Futurist Manifesto of Sacred Art (1931) signed by Marinetti and Fillìa. The Futurist involvement in religious art followed the signing of the Lateran Treaty between the Vatican and Fascist Italy in 1929.

In 1939 Dottori was appointed to the chair of painting at Perugia, remaining in that post until 1947. In 1941 he wrote the Manifesto of Umbrian Aeropainting in which he proposed that the essence of his Futurism lay in the representation of mystically-inclined landscapes.

Dottori carried out many mural commissions, including the Altro Mondo in Perugia and the hydroport in Ostia. Mural painting was embraced by the Futurists in the Manifesto of Mural Plasticism at a time when the revival of fresco painting was being debated in Italy.

Following a post-war silence around Marinetti's Futurism, Dottori exhibited in 1951 at Bergamini and the 1953 Biennale of Angelicum and continued to exhibit in the 1950s and 1960s. In 1989 a retrospective of Dottori's work was presented at the Gallery San Carlo.

Crocifissione (1927), a Futurist representation of the crucifixion of Christ (pictured right) is now housed in the Vatican Museum.
