= Nikolay Diulgheroff =

Italian painter

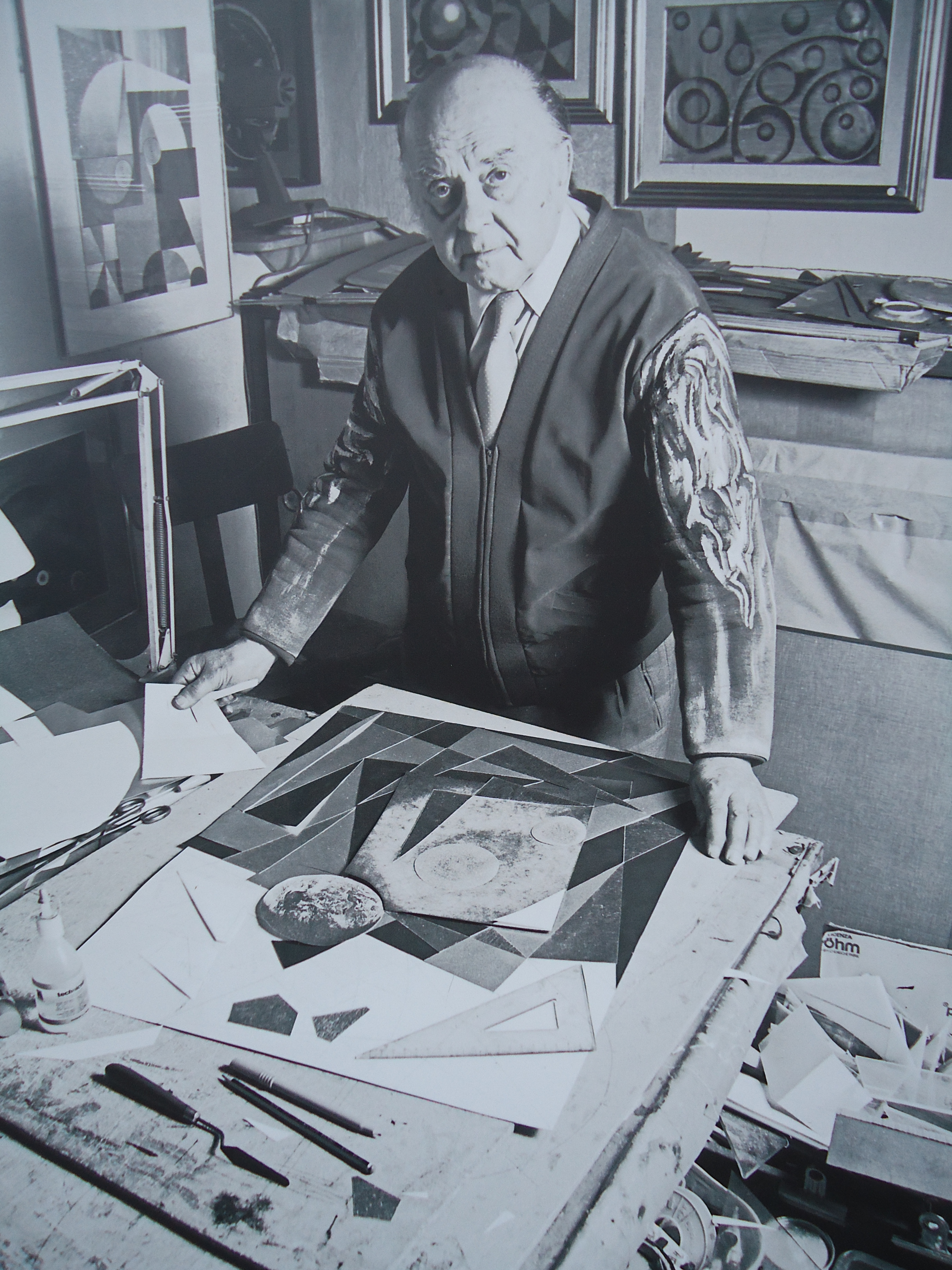
Nikolay Diulgheroff in his workshop

Nikolay Diulgheroff (Bulgarian: Николай Дюлгеров, Nikolay Dyulgerov; 20 December 1901 – 9 June 1982) was a Bulgarian artist, designer and architect who was active in Italy as a prominent representative of interwar Italian Futurism (il secondo Futurismo).

== Biography ==
Diulgheroff was born in Kyustendil, a town in the western part of the Principality of Bulgaria, to a printer father. In 1920 and 1921, he studied at the University of Applied Arts in Vienna, Austria. The following year he studied in Dresden, Germany, and in 1923 he enrolled at the original Bauhaus in Weimar, where he was close to Swiss expressionist Johannes Itten. While a student in Germany, Diulgheroff exhibited his art in Berlin and Dresden. In 1924, he had his separate exhibition in Sofia, the capital of Bulgaria.

In 1926, Diulgheroff settled in Turin, Italy, to study architecture at the Accademia Albertina, graduating in 1932. Bringing with him a characteristically Central European constructivist culture, he was introduced to many of the eminent Italian futurists, such as Fillia, and adopted that style. Diulgheroff created his most notable works in the 1920s and 1930s. Some of his art is exhibited in the Galleria Nazionale d'Arte Moderna in Rome. He contributed to the Futurist meals formulated in Filippo Tommaso Marinetti and Fillia's 1930 Manifesto of Futurist Cooking: the dish pollofiat was his idea and he co-designed the interior of the Taverna Santopalato, the prime establishment for futurist cuisine. He created posters for Cinzano and Amaro Cora and advertising for Campari. Diulgheroff was part of leading futurist exhibitions throughout the 1920s and 1930s, such as those in Turin, Leipzig, Paris, Florence, Barcelona, Mantua and Venice.

Diulgheroff died in Turin, the city where he spent 56 years, in 1982. Diulgheroff remained active as an artist almost until his death. He is an honorary citizen of Turin and art historian Enrico Crispolti considers him the greatest of all interwar artists.
