= Noi: Rivista d'arte futurista =

Art magazine in Italy (1917–1925)

- Director: Enrico Prampolini; Bino Sanminiatelli
- Categories: Art magazine
- Frequency: Irregular (1917–1923); Monthly (1923–1925)
- Founder: Enrico Prampolini; Bino Sanminiatelli
- Founded: 1917
- First issue: June 1917
- Final issue: 1925
- Country: Kingdom of Italy
- Based in: Rome
- Language: Italian

Noi: Rivista d’arte futurista was an avant-garde magazine which adopted a futurist stance. It was published in Rome between 1917 and 1925. Its subtitle was Raccolta internazionale d’arte d’avanguardia (Italian: International collection of avant-garde art).

== History and profile ==
Noi was first published in June 1917. The magazine aimed at making the Italian culture more connected with the European culture. Its founders were Italian painter Enrico Prampolini and Bino Sanminiatelli. Noi was edited by Enrico Prampolini, Bino Sanminiatelli and Vittorio Orazi.

Its headquarters was in Rome. The magazine came out irregularly until 1923 when its frequency was redesigned as monthly. Noi folded in 1925.

Some issues of Noi were archived by the Leibniz University Hannover.
