= Galleria d'Arte Moderna e Contemporanea, Viareggio =

Art museum in Viareggio, Italy

Coordinates: 43.8710°N 10.2435°E

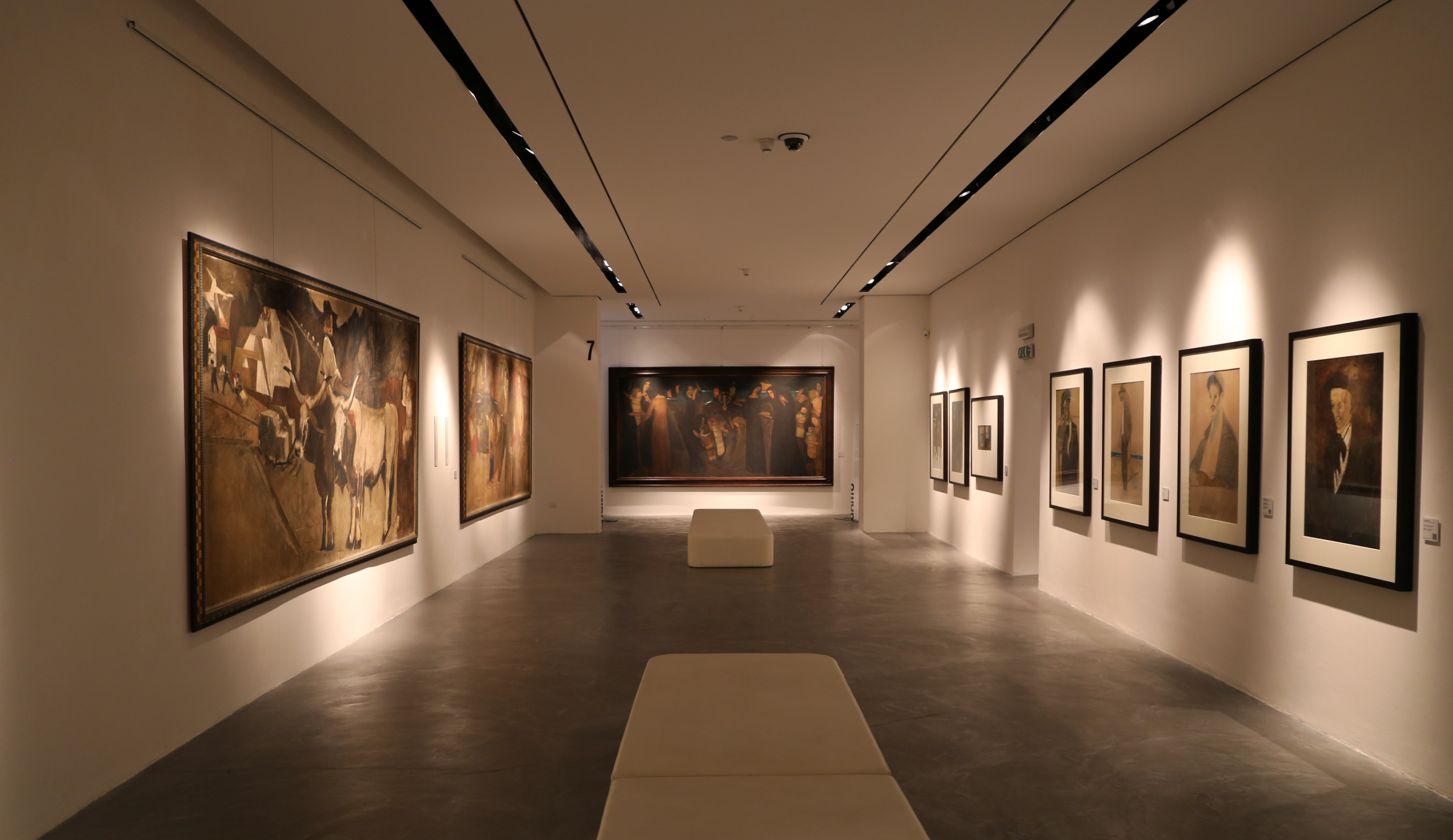
Lorenzo Viani's Room

Galleria d'Arte Moderna e Contemporanea (GAMC) is a museum of art in Viareggio, Italy. The museum is also known as "Lorenzo Viani", after the Viareggio artist whose most important public collection the museum houses. The museum is located on the Palazzo delle Muse. GAMC holds 3000 works by 750 artists, including 85 pieces by Viani.
