= Lorenzo Viani =

Italian painter, engraver and writer

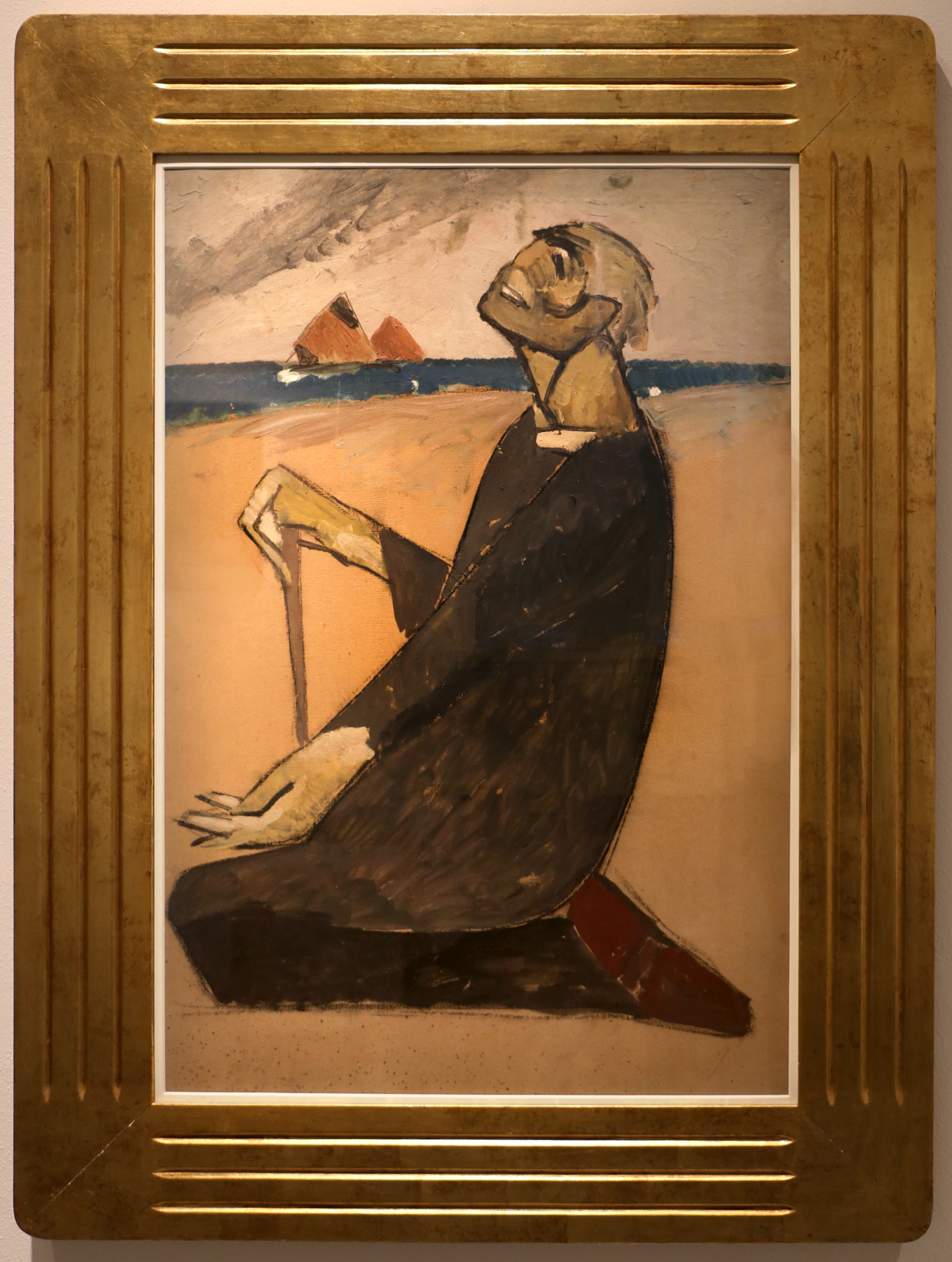
Lorenzo Viani, The Blind Man's Pray, 1920-1923, Galleria d'Arte Moderna e Contemporanea, Viareggio

Lorenzo Viani (1 November 1882 – 2 November 1936) was an Italian painter, engraver, writer and poet.

== Life and career ==
Lorenzo Viani was born on 1 November 1882, in Viareggio, Italy.

Viani died on 2 November 1936.

The Galleria d'Arte Moderna e Contemporanea, Viareggio, holds the largest collection of his most important work. The museum which is also named after him holds 85 of his works.
