= Franco Costa (painter) =

Italian painter (1934–2015)

- Born: 10 October 1934; Rome, Italy
- Died: 4 March 2015 (aged 80); Rome, Italy
- Education: Ecole des Art et Métiers, Paris
- Known for: Painting, Costume Design, Sculpting and Textiles.
- Spouses: Mila Valvassori, Valentina Mascia, Jose Pauline Beemsterboer

Franco Costa (14 August 1934 – 4 March 2015) was an Italian painter known for his colourful paintings and his art associated to several major sailing events. He also worked with cinema, costume design, sculptures and textiles.

== Life ==
Costa was born on 14 August 1934 in Rome.

In 1948, Costa had his first experience in stained glass in a church in Dundee, Scotland. Two years later, at the age of sixteen, he finished his studies of violin and harmony at the Accademia of Santa Cecilia in Rome, and his Jesuit Classical education. He continued his studies, simultaneously, in French language and literature in Geneva, architecture in Zurich, and studied at L’Ecole des Art et Métiers in Paris. During this time, while in Vence and Antibes, France, he often met with Nicolas de Staël, Pablo Picasso, Henri Matisse and other artists.

After the death of Nicolas de Staël, Franco Costa left for South America where he travelled to Argentina and Brazil, mainly for the project of building Brasília with his uncle Lucio Costa. During his time in South America, he encountered, among others, Che Guevara, Manuel Kantor and Hugo del Carril.

Returning to Europe in 1965, Franco collaborated with French and Italian high fashion as a stylist for new designs of fabrics, used by Dior, Lancetti, Grès and Valentino.

In 1967 he travelled to Ethiopia, where he published his book Theodor II (a story on Emperor Theodor's life). While travelling through China, India, and Nepal, he was inspired by oriental arts. He returned in Europe in 1968 when he collaborated with Federico Fellini as a costume designer and assistant art director for the film Juliet of the spirits. In 1971, he collaborated, in Argentina, with the writer of “Clockwork Orange” and later with the director Stanley Kubrick for both theaterplay and film.

Since the mid-seventies, numerous exhibitions have been held in South America and Europe, especially in Sweden, where the Light of Sweden Foundation was founded in 1978. Among other charitable purposes, the foundation was founded for starving children around the world. The artist donated part of his income and also motivated other people to donate.

In 1980 he was the official artist of the America's Cup, which led the way for his participation in several other sporting events. In 1988 he was in Kiel, where he became the official artist of the Baltic Match Race, and received positive reviews for his pictures. This led to a long-lasting friendship with the region of Schleswig-Holstein.

On the occasion of the 50th anniversary commemoration of the Holocaust and the memorial concert of Gilbert Levine in Rome, Costa created the painting Never more Holocaust in 1994, which he donated to Pope John Paul II.

On the occasion of the 100th anniversary of the Nord-Ostsee-Kanal, he created several paintings, which were exhibited throughout Northern Europe, in 1995, among others, at Villa Harvey Dräger in Hamburg

In support of young artists Franco Costa has also invested both time and money. In 1997 he founded his foundation Usedom feeling.

A large part of his work was exhibited in the museum in Scheveningen in the Netherlands.

== Important works ==
- 1980 Tack on the wave
- 1990 Stars & Stripes (Dennis Conner's America's Cup, 1987)
- 1994 Never more Holocaust
- 1996 Food for all - for the Food and Agriculture Organization
- 2005 New York, New York
- 2006 I LOVE KIEL
- 2010 Projekt Rhein 2010
