= Enrico Prampolini =

Italian painter (1894–1956)

- Enrico Prampolini
- Born: April 20, 1894; Modena, Kingdom of Italy
- Died: June 17, 1956 (aged 62); Rome, Italy
- Education: Accademia di Belle Arti di Roma
- Known for: Painting, sculpture, scenography
- Movement: Futurism; Aeropainting

Signature
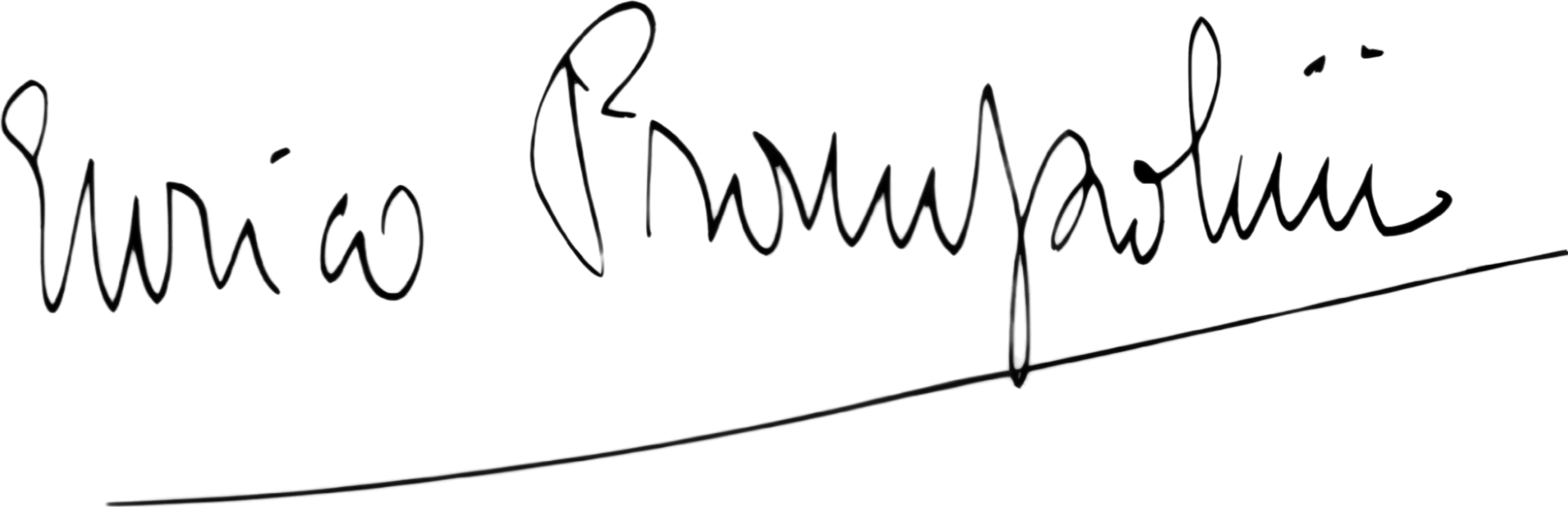

Enrico Prampolini (20 April 1894, Modena – 17 June 1956, Rome) was an Italian Futurist painter, sculptor and scenographer. A prominent figure in the early 20th-century avant-garde movement, his work reflected Futurism's fascination with speed, technology, and modernity through dynamic compositions and innovative uses of color and form. In addition to contributing to Aeropainting (like Gerardo Dottori) and assisting in the design of the Exhibition of the Fascist Revolution, he was particularly influential in theater set and costume design, where he seamlessly blended the visual arts with performance.

He pursued a programme of abstract and quasi-abstract painting, combined with a prolific career in stage design. His Spatial-Landscape Construction (1919) is quasi-abstract with large flat areas in bold colours, predominantly red, orange, blue and dark green. His Simultaneous Landscape (1922) is totally abstract, with flat colours and no attempt to create perspective. In his Umbrian Landscape (1929), produced in the year of the Aeropainting Manifesto, Prampolini returned to figuration, representing the hills of Umbria. But by 1931 he had adopted "cosmic idealism", a biomorphic abstractionism quite different from the works of the previous decade, for example in Pilot of the Infinite (1931) and Biological Apparition (1940).

Prampolini was an influence on Tullio Crali.

== Life ==
After studying with Duilio Cambellotti at the Academy of Fine Arts in Rome, he became a leading member of the Futurist Movement as a painter, scenographer and architect. He had close contacts with the representatives of the European avant-garde art, with the Section d'Or, Dadaism, the Bauhaus, De Stijl, the Abstraction-Création group, with Pablo Picasso, Piet Mondrian, Wassily Kandinsky and Jean Cocteau.

From 1913 for a period collaborates with the monthly magazine Varietas in Milan.

In 1917, with Bino Sanminiatelli he founded the magazine Noi. The same year, he realised the sets for the futurist film Thaïs, directed by Anton Giulio Bragaglia. He created the interior of a dream and suffocating villa, whose walls are decorated with spirals, lozenges, chessboards and symbolic figures. This film had a significant influence on the anti-naturalistic scenes of German Expressionism.

Prampolini's work occupies a place of its own in European abstract art, characterized by its deep concern for dynamism and Organicism, which manifests itself in the cosmic visions and dreams of the 1930s and 1940s. In 1927 he founded the "Futurist Theatre Prampolini" to further explore the synthesis of visual art and stagecraft. In 1928 he conceived the Futurist Pavilion at the "Esposizione del Valentino" in Turin, which was realised by Fillìa and Pino Curtone.

Together with Fillia, he realized in 1933 a large mosaic Le comunicazioni for the tower of the Palazzo delle Poste in La Spezia. After the futurist experience, he produced different materials and works, sometimes influenced by the visions of the microcosm. He declared that his aim to express the extreme latitudes of the introspective world. His work was also part of the painting event in the art competition at the 1936 Summer Olympics.

In 1944 he taught theatre and set design at the Brera Academy in Milan.
