= Benedetta Cappa =

Italian painter (1897–1977)

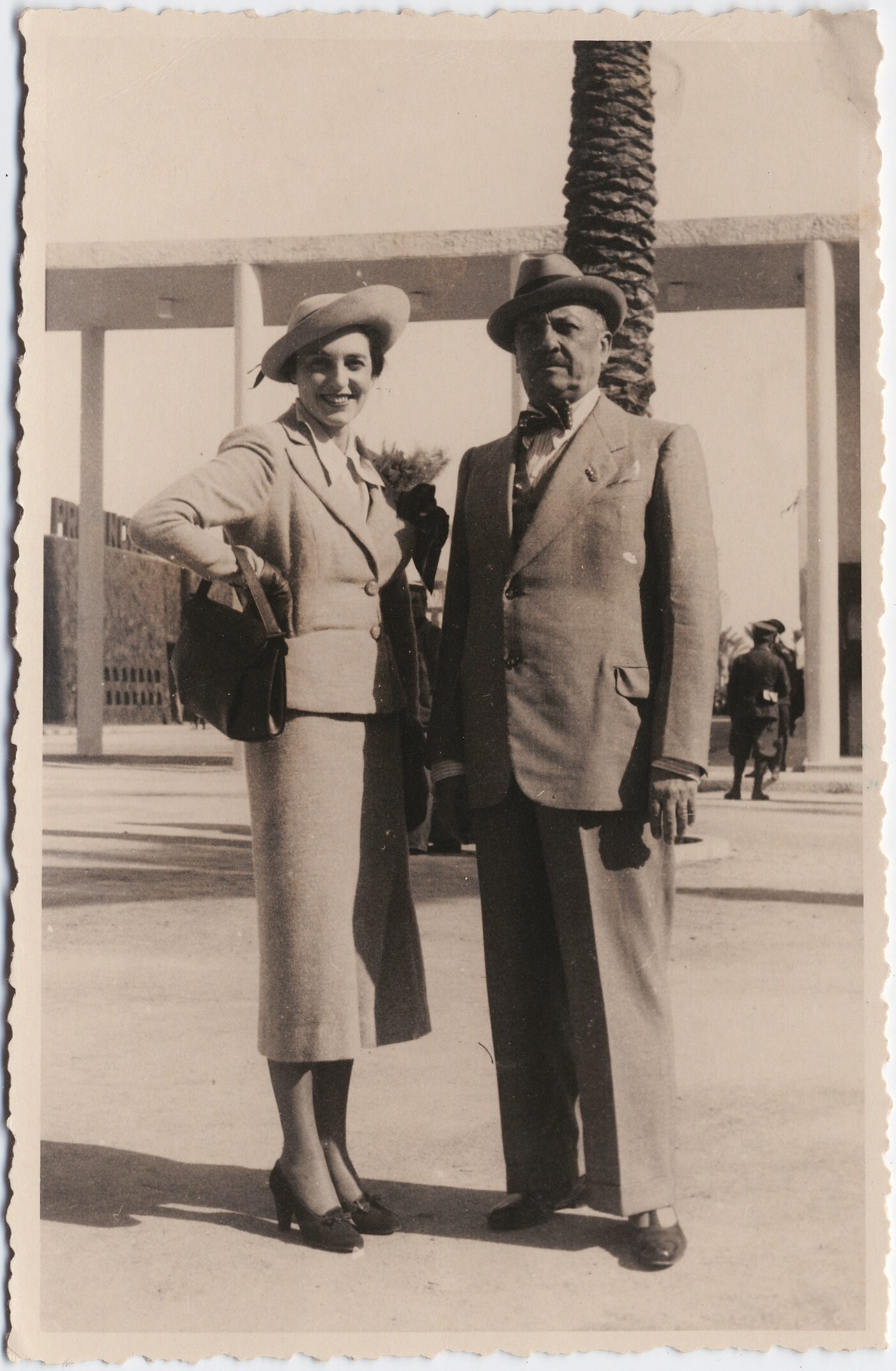
- Cappa and Marinetti, 18 March 1937
- Born: 14 August 1897; Rome, Italy
- Died: 15 May 1977 (aged 79); Venice, Italy
- Other names: Cappa Marinetti, Benedetta
- Occupation: Artist
- Spouse: Filippo Tommaso Marinetti

Benedetta Cappa (14 August 1897 – 15 May 1977) was an Italian artist. Her work was the subject of retrospective exhibitions at the Walker Art Center in Minneapolis and the Solomon R. Guggenheim Museum in New York. Her paintings are traditionally considered part of the second wave of Italian Futurism.

== Biography ==
Benedetta Cappa was born in Rome, the second of five children. Her mother, Amalia Cappa, was a numerologist who believed in the properties of alphabetic letters. She gave her four sons names that begin with the letter A and her only daughter, Benedetta, a name that began with B. Amalia was also a cultured woman and a Protestant. Cappa’s father, Innocenzo Cappa, was an official of the Ministry of Railways and later an officer in the Italian army. He died after returning from World War I, an event that impacted her so deeply that she described her emotional and psychological state as a “broken core”. Her brothers Alberto and Arturo, a historian and a journalist, also had ties to the military and Italian politics, bringing the family in close contact with the Socialist Party and eventually many Futurist thinkers.

The Cappas were a middle-class family. Benedetta Cappa had access to an education that allowed her to nurture her strong vocation to painting and literature. As a child, Cappa wrote poetry and took painting and piano lessons. She attended Vittoria Columna high school in Rome and graduated in 1914. During World War I she worked at an after-school program for underprivileged children. Her interest in educational science led her to explore the pedagogy of Maria Montessori, whose ideas and concepts treat learning as a primarily sensory experience. Cappa’s interest in tactile exploration continued and would later be reconfigured in her version of Futurist ideology. She received a degree in elementary education from the "Universita degli Studi di Roma" in 1917.

Around 1917, Cappa’s brother’s activities with the Futurists and friendship with Futurist artist Růžena Zátková inspired her to leave teaching. She began her training as a painter in the studio of Giacomo Balla, an abstract artist who created pieces that captured movement and light. Cappa initially modeled her choices of theme and style after her mentor, depicting dynamic objects and the impact they have on their surroundings. Balla became an important mentor and a lifelong friend.

Cappa began to meet avant-garde artists, poets and writers who gathered in the studio. In 1918, she met Filippo Tommaso Marinetti at Casa Balla. Their friendship was first based on intellectual pursuits and they began exchanging letters in 1918. Initially, these are written with a certain formality on both parts and deal with Futurist ideas and a discussion of their literary works. By 1920 Marinetti is addressing his correspondence to B. Cappa Marinetti. Cappa and Marinetti married three years later.

== Artwork and influence ==
Though she was an artist active in Futurist circles, Cappa felt labels were restrictive and initially rejected the designation. In a 1918 correspondence with F.T. Marinetti she writes, “I am too free and rebellious – I do not want to be restricted. I want only to be me.” Despite entering her marriage with such determined independence, the considerable contributions made by Cappa are often overshadowed by the figure of Marinetti and the vociferous manner with which he directed the movement. Cappa’s body of work spanned a range of media that included pen, paper, paint, metal and textiles. She wrote poetry and prose, signed, and spoke as an individual, but only recently has she garnered independent recognition.

In 1919, Cappa published Psicologia di un Uomo, a collection of poetry which incorporates “unusual word placement, typographic experimentation, and visual and auditory correspondences”. Subsequently published in 1924, Le Forze Umane: Romanzo Astratto con Sintesi Grafiche (Human Forces: Abstract Novel with Graphic Synthesis), has a similar structure presented in an extrapolated form. Two images from this novel provide an interesting conceptual contrast. The first, Forze Femminili: Spirale di Dolcezza + Serpe di Fascino (Feminine Forces: Spiral of Sweetness + Serpent of Charm) consists simply of three curved lines, one of which provides a central axis for the other two. The linear composition of the second drawing, Forze Maschili: Armi e Piume (Masculine Forces: Weapons and Feathers), has numerous straight lines and arcs arranged in an impenetrable tangle.

Cappa's publication of Le Forze Umane was one of three books she has written. The release of her book made many futurists question her allegiance with Futurism, for her book seemed to align more with Neo-Plasticism at the time by many male Futurists who have written reviews on Cappa's book. Cappa collected all of the reviews in her Librone which can be found at the Getty Research Institute. It was a decision made from many reviewers that Cappa's first book represents the unwillingness from the reviewers to accept a women's work as part of Futurism.

The action and aesthetic of the machine age is a trope within Futurism that appears frequently in Cappa’s artwork. One early abstract painting, Velocità di Motoscafo, (Velocity of a Motorboat), (1923–24), contains many of the elements that would come to mark Cappa’s painting style. Well defined, curvilinear shapes, painted in gradient tones are compositionally arranged to imply objects in motion: “… the interplay of ‘force lines,’ become the subject”. The artist’s exploration of the machine continued with Luci + Rumori di un Treno Notturno, (Lights + Sounds of a Night Train), (ca. 1924) and with Aeropittura (1925). A trip to Latin America in 1926 was followed by a series of abstract paintings done in gouache on paper.

As Cappa developed her artistic practice, her influence within the Futurist Movement expanded. Between the end of World War I and the early 1930s, there was an ideological transformation which led to the period commonly known as Second Wave Futurism. The notably misogynistic tone of the foundation texts was largely muted as the number of female Futurists increased. Several other themes, such as Technology, Speed, and Mechanization carried over into this new incarnation of Futurism. For this reason, Cappa’s oil painting Il Grande X (1931) is considered the culmination of one era and the prelude to another. In the two decades since F.T. Marinetti’s manifesto, the brash avant-garde movement had largely become the establishment.

It was the Futurists’ affiliation with the state establishment that would lead to one of Cappa’s most recognizable paintings, her mural series for the Conference Room at the Palazzo delle Poste in Palermo, Sicily. The building is an amalgam of works by several Futurist artists. Designed by the Rationalist architect, Angiolo Mazzoni, the Poste Italiane houses tile wall mosaics by Luigi Colombo Filìa and Enrico Prampolini in addition to the murals by Benendetta. The shared themes of synthesis and communication are critical to the aesthetic program of the Futurist structure. Completed between 1933 and 1934, each painting depicts a form of information transfer, including terrestrial, maritime, aerial, radio, telegraphic and telephonic communication. The pale blue and green color palette, along with the use of tempera and encaustic media, were designed to invoke resonances with Pompeian frescos. The collection represents the idealized speed and efficiency of message delivery in the modern world.

== Exhibition history and legacy ==
Cappa’s works were exhibited widely, along with the rest of the Italian Futurists, both during her lifetime and after, with major exhibitions as early as 1926 and up until the outbreak of World War II. She was a regular participant in the Venice Biennale, and was the first woman to have a painting reproduced in a Biennale catalog. A long pause ensued after the war, which lasted until the 1980s, when the works of the Futurists were, once again, starting to be appreciated. Selected exhibitions of her works include the following:

- 1926 15th Venice Biennale; 4th Calabrian National Biennale; 34 Pittori Futuristi, Galleria Pesaro, Milan
- 1927 Mostra di Pittura Futurista, Casa del Fascio, Bologna; Mostra d’Arte Futurista Nazionale, Convegno, Palermo
- 1928 Grande mostra futurista, Teatro comunale, Imola
- 1929 Terza Mostra d’Arte Marinara, Palazzo delle Esposizioni, Rome
- 1930 17th Venice Biennale
- 1931 2nd National Rome Quadriennale of Art, Palazzo delle Esposizioni, Rome; Prima Mostra degli Futuristi, Galleria La Camerata degli Artisti, Rome; Prima Mostra Triestina di Pittura e Aeropittura Futurista, Circolo Artistico di Trieste; Mostra di Aeropittura e di Scenografiamm, Galleria Pesaro, Milan
- 1932 18th Venice Biennale; Enrico Prampolini et les Aeropeintures Futuristes Italiens, Galerie de la Renaissance, Paris
- 1934 19th Venice Biennale; La Plastica Murale, Palazzo Ducale, Genoa
- 1935 3rd National Rome Quadriennale of Art, Palazzo delle Esposizioni, Rome
- 1936 20th Venice Biennale
- 1939 4th National Rome Quadriennale of Art, Palazzo delle Esposizioni, Rome
- 1982 Svolgimento del Futurismo, Palazzo Reale, Milan
- 1985 Aeropittura Futurista, Galleria Fonte d’Abisso, Modena
- 1986 La Macchina Mito Futurista, Galleria Editalia, Rome; Futurismo & Futurismi, Palazzo Grassi, Venice
- 1989 Casa Balla e il Futurismo a Roma, Villa Medici, Rome; Aero e Pittura: Mostra del Volo e della Sua Conquista, Castel Sant’Elmo, Naples
- 1990 Futurists in Flight, Academy of Applied Arts, London
- 1991 Atmosfere Futuriste, Scuderie di Palazzo Ruspoli, Rome
- 1996 Futuristi e aeropittuori a Catania, Galleria d’Arte Moderna, Catania
- 1998 La Futurista, Benedetta Cappa Marinetti, Walker Art Center, Minneapolis
- 2014 Italian Futurism 1909-1944: Reconstructing the Universe, Solomon R. Guggenheim Museum, New York

The 1998 exhibition in Minneapolis was the first major international solo retrospective of Cappa’s works, but it is perhaps the comprehensive Futurists’ exhibition at the Guggenheim in New York of 2014 that saw the most exposure for her work, as she was the best represented of the nine female artists included in one of the most expansive exhibitions of Italian Futurism ever mounted, covering more than 360 works by some 80 artists. Indeed, it was Benedetta’s five monumental mural paintings, Sintesi delle Comunicazioni (Synthesis of Communication)(1933-1934), which closed the show, on loan for the first time ever, and placed as they were, at the apex of the exhibition.

These murals are the best known of her works, stemming from the muralism movement of the second wave of Futurism, which began in the early 1930s. This new emphasis on murals by the Futurists was brought to prominence in 1934, when they published three articles on muralism in their new magazine, Stile Futurista. The effort was motivated by the younger Futurists, who thought the medium would allow them to utilize the panoptic and panoramic vision of the earlier, Aeropittura pictorial genre of the Futurists to best effect in creating the “total environment” in which they had long sought to immerse viewers with their works.(p. 317)

Futurist murals were unique in that they would contain only imagery inspired by modern technology. The Futurists were also keen to have public commissions for their murals, and cited numerous venues they wished to embellish with them in pamphlets published to accompany their two mural exhibitions of 1934. Their wish list included numerous political and public venues, such as train stations, posts offices, schools, and even a seaplane base.

Despite their efforts, the Futurists received few public mural commissions in the 1930s, with the exception of three mural-sized works for the new Palazzi delle Poste e Telegraphi (Post and Telegraph offices) in La Spezia, Palermo. La Spezia was an important port and also home to several military bases at the time. Almost all of Benedetta’s paintings which have survived were painted within a fifteen-year period. The earliest of these can be traced to 1924, when she created her well known Treno nella Notte in Velocità, (Speeding Train by Night), as well as Velocità di Motoscafo, (Speed of a Motorboat), considered her finest piece of abstract painting.

In addition to her rich artistic legacy, Cappa constantly reaffirmed in her works a desire that contributions by women would help to reduce aggression, although she did so in accordance with the Futurist’s revolutionary ideals. But even within the context of the male-dominated Futurist movement, and the marriage to its founder, Cappa insisted on direct action and participation for women: In her own words: “I believe that the feminine soul is at the dawn of her artistic expression...without copying the experiences of men.”(p. 69)
