= Filippo Tommaso Marinetti =

Italian poet (1876–1944)

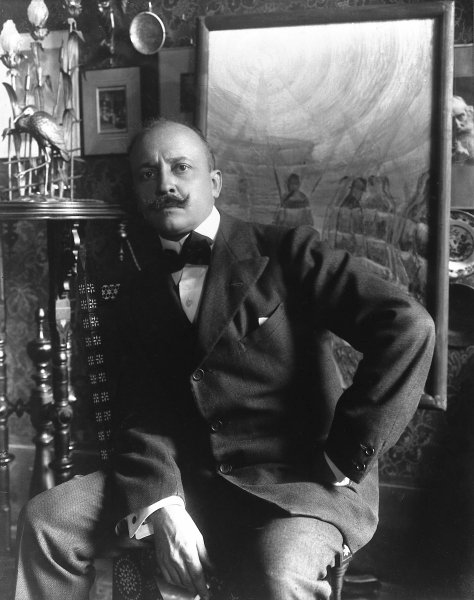
- Born: 22 December 1876; Alexandria, Khedivate of Egypt
- Died: 2 December 1944 (aged 67); Bellagio, Lombardy, Italy
- Education: University of Paris; University of Pavia
- Occupations: Poet; writer; editor
- Spouse: Benedetta Cappa (m. 1923)
- Writing career
- Notable work: Manifesto of Futurism (1909)
- Movement: Futurism

Signature
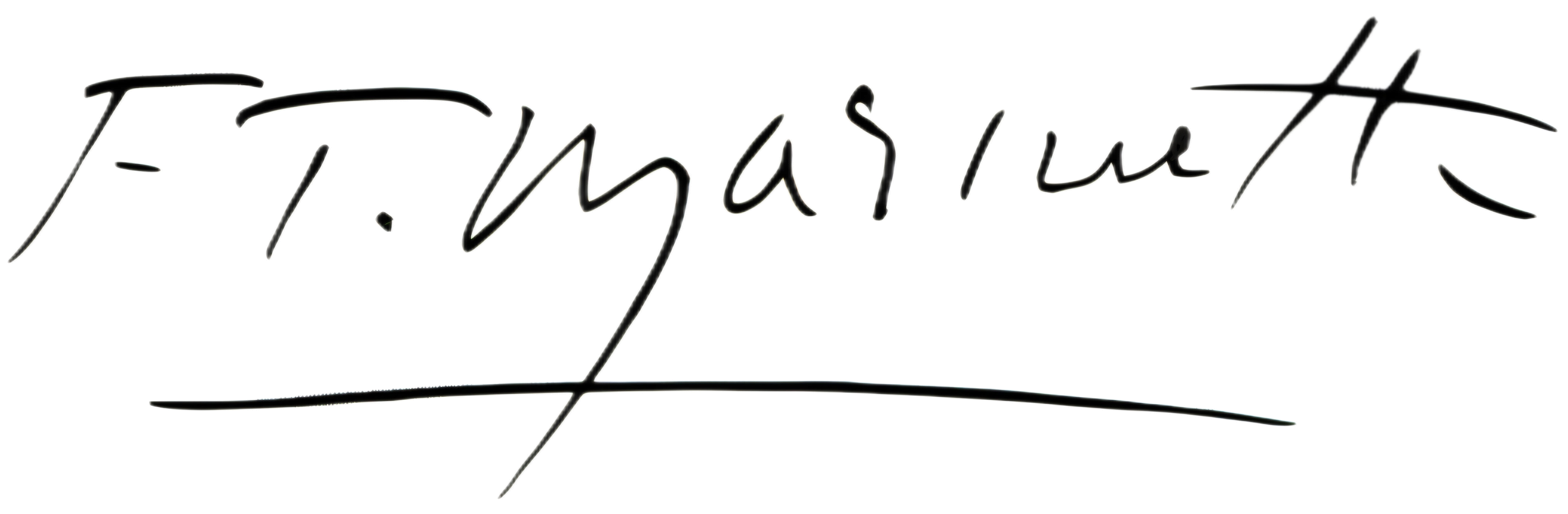

Filippo Tommaso Emilio Marinetti (Italian: [fiˈlippo tomˈmaːzo mariˈnetti]; 22 December 1876 – 2 December 1944) was an Italian poet, editor, art theorist and founder of the Futurist movement. He was associated with the utopian and Symbolist artistic and literary community Abbaye de Créteil between 1907 and 1908. Marinetti is best known as the author of the Manifesto of Futurism, which was written and published in 1909, and as a co-author of the Fascist Manifesto, in 1919.

== Childhood and adolescence ==
Emilio Angelo Carlo Marinetti (some documents give his name as "Filippo Achille Emilio Marinetti") spent the first years of his life in Alexandria, Egypt, where his father, Enrico Marinetti, and mother, Amalia Grolli, lived together more uxorio (as if married). Enrico was a lawyer from Piedmont, and his mother was the daughter of a literary professor from Milan. They had come to Egypt in 1865 at the invitation of Khedive Isma'il Pasha to act as legal advisers for foreign companies that were taking part in his modernization program.

Marinetti's love for literature developed during the school years. His mother was an avid reader of poetry and introduced her young son to the Italian and other European classics. At 17, he started his first school magazine, Papyrus; the Jesuits threatened to expel him for publicizing Émile Zola's scandalous novels in the school.

He studied in Egypt and then in Paris, obtained a baccalauréat degree in 1894 at the Sorbonne University and in Italy, and graduated in law at the University of Pavia in 1899.

He decided not to be a lawyer but to develop a literary career. He experimented with every type of literature (poetry, narrative, theatre, words in liberty) and signed everything "Filippo Tommaso Marinetti".

== Futurism ==
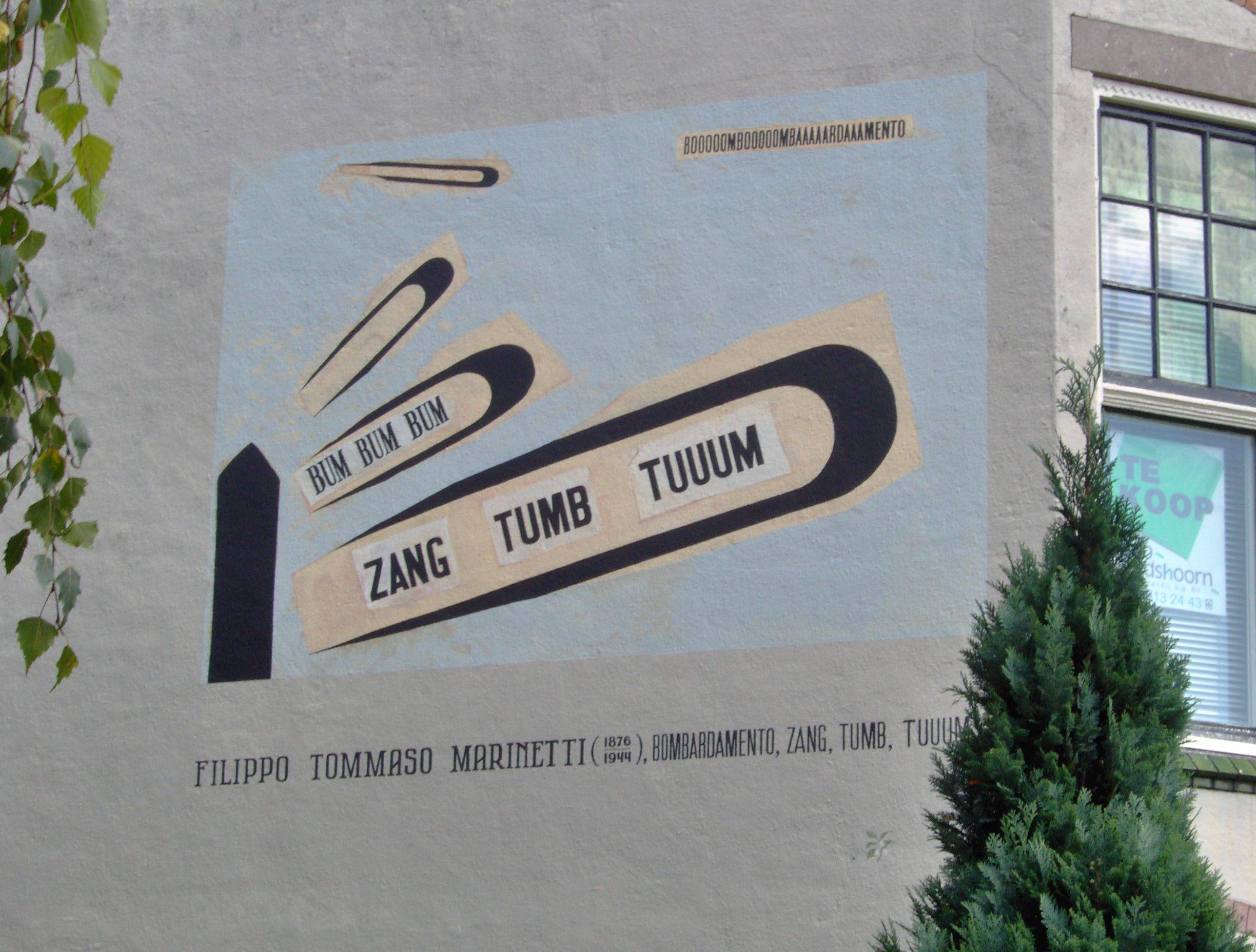
Poem of Marinetti on a wall in Leiden

Marinetti and Constantin Brâncuși were visitors of the Abbaye de Créteil around 1908, along with young writers like Roger Allard (one of the first to defend Cubism), Pierre Jean Jouve and Paul Castiaux, who wanted to publish their works through the Abbaye. The Abbaye de Créteil was a phalanstère community founded in the autumn of 1906 by the painter Albert Gleizes, and the poets René Arcos, Henri-Martin Barzun, Alexandre Mercereau and Charles Vildrac. The movement drew its inspiration from the Abbaye de Thélème, a fictional creation by Rabelais in his novel Gargantua. It was closed down by its members in early 1908.

Marinetti is known best as the author of the Futurist Manifesto, which he wrote in 1909. It was published in French on the front page of the most prestigious French daily newspaper, Le Figaro, on 20 February 1909. Marinetti declared in it, "Art, in fact, can be nothing but violence, cruelty, and injustice". Georges Sorel, who influenced the entire political spectrum from anarchism to Fascism, also argued for the importance of violence. Futurism had both anarchist and Fascist elements; Marinetti later became an active supporter of Benito Mussolini.

Marinetti, who admired speed, had a minor car crash outside Milan in 1908 after he veered into a ditch to avoid two cyclists. He referred to the crash in the Futurist Manifesto. The Marinetti who was helped out of the ditch was a new man, determined to end the pretense and decadence of the prevailing Liberty style. He discussed a new and strongly revolutionary programme with his friends, in which they should end every artistic relationship with the past, "destroy the museums, the libraries, every type of academy". Together, he wrote, "We will glorify war—the world's only hygiene—militarism, patriotism, the destructive gesture of freedom-bringers, beautiful ideas worth dying for, and scorn for woman".

The Futurist Manifesto was read and debated all across Europe, but Marinetti's first Futurist works were not as successful. In April, the opening night of his drama Le Roi bombance (The Feasting King), written in 1905, was interrupted by loud, derisive whistling by the audience and by Marinetti himself, who thus introduced another element of Futurism, "the desire to be heckled". Marinetti, however, fought a duel with a critic whom he considered too harsh.

His drama La donna è mobile (Poupées électriques), first presented in Turin, was not successful either. Nowadays, the play is remembered through a later version, Elettricità sessuale (Sexual Electricity), mainly for the appearance onstage of humanoid automatons ten years before the Czech writer Karel Čapek invented the term robot.

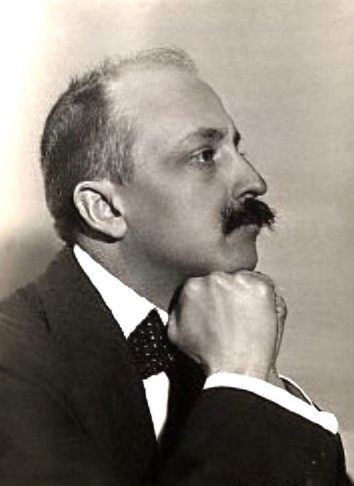
Filippo Tommaso Marinetti c. 1924

In 1910, his first novel, Mafarka il futurista, was cleared of all charges by an obscenity trial. That year, Marinetti discovered some allies in three young painters (Umberto Boccioni, Carlo Carrà and Luigi Russolo), who adopted the Futurist philosophy. Together with them and poets such as Aldo Palazzeschi, Marinetti began a series of Futurist Evenings, theatrical spectacles in which Futurists declaimed their manifestos in front of a crowd that in part attended the performances to throw vegetables at them.

The most successful "happening" of that period was the publicization of the "Manifesto Against Past-Loving Venice" in Venice. In the flier, Marinetti demands "fill(ing) the small, stinking canals with the rubble from the old, collapsing and leprous palaces" to "prepare for the birth of an industrial and militarized Venice, capable of dominating the great Adriatic, a great Italian lake".

In 1911, the Italo-Turkish War began, and Marinetti departed for Libya as a war correspondent for a French newspaper. His articles were eventually collected and published in The Battle of Tripoli. He then covered the First Balkan War of 1912–1913 and witnessed the surprise success of Bulgarian troops against the Ottoman Empire during the Siege of Adrianople. In this period, he also made a number of visits to London, which he considered 'the Futurist city par excellence' and where a number of exhibitions, lectures and demonstrations of Futurist music were staged.

Marinetti sought to establish an English Futurism and initially had an ally in Harold Monro, the editor of Poetry and Drama, a London literary journal. Monro devoted the September 1913 issue to Futurism, praising Marinetti in a long editorial. However, although a number of artists, including Wyndham Lewis, were interested in the new movement, only one British convert was made, the young artist C.R.W. Nevinson. Marinetti's campaign both threatened and influenced Ezra Pound, who founded his own literary movement, Imagism and wrote manifestos to publicize it and attack Futurism. One result of Pound's strong reaction to Marinetti was his advocacy of James Joyce and T.S. Eliot. Joyce was exposed to Futurism while living in Trieste. The movement's techniques are reflected in Ulysses and in Finnegans Wake, one section of which alludes to “crucial elements of Futurism".

Futurism was an important influence upon Lewis's Vorticist philosophy. Vorticism, named by Pound, was founded with the publication of Blast to which Pound was a major contributor. An advertisement promised that Blast would cover "Cubism, Futurism, Imagisme and All Vital Forms of Modern Art". Blast was published only twice, in 1914 and 1915. Writing to Monro, Marinetti said that he was saddened by the reviews of Vorticism in the English press unfavorably comparing it with Futurism and would rather have worked in collaboration with the Vorticists. He and Pound later became friends, and in Canto LXXII, written in Italian, Pound meets the spirit of the recently deceased Marinetti.

Meanwhile, Marinetti worked on a very anti-Catholic and anti-Austro-Hungarian verse-novel, Le monoplan du Pape (The Pope's Aeroplane, 1912), and edited an anthology of futurist poets, but his attempts to renew the style of poetry did not satisfy him. So much so that, in his foreword to the anthology, he declared a new revolution: it was time to be done with traditional syntax and to use "words in freedom" (parole in libertà). His sound-poem Zang Tumb Tumb, an account of the Battle of Adrianople, exemplifies words in freedom. Recordings can be heard of Marinetti reading some of his sound poems: Battaglia, Peso + Odore (1912); Dune, parole in libertà (1914); La Battaglia di Adrianopoli (1926) (recorded 1935).

== First World War ==
Marinetti agitated for Italian involvement in the First World War and, once Italy had been engaged, promptly volunteered for service. In the fall of 1915, he and several other Futurists who were members of the Lombard Volunteer Cyclists were stationed at Lake Garda, in Trentino Province, high in the mountains along the Italo-Austrian border. They endured several weeks of fighting in harsh conditions before the cyclists units, deemed inappropriate for mountain warfare, were disbanded.

Marinetti spent most of 1916 supporting Italy's war effort with speeches, journalism and theatrical work and then returned to military service as a regular army officer in 1917. In May 1917, he was seriously wounded while serving with an artillery battalion on the Isonzo Front. He returned to service after a long recovery and participated in the decisive Italian victory at Vittorio Veneto in October 1918.

== Marriage ==
After an extended courtship, in 1923 Marinetti married Benedetta Cappa (1897–1977), a writer and painter and a pupil of Giacomo Balla. Born in Rome, she had joined the Futurists in 1917. They had met in 1918, moved in together in Rome, and chose to marry only to avoid legal complications on a lecture tour of Brazil. They had three daughters: Vittoria, Ala, and Luce.

Cappa and Marinetti collaborated on a genre of mixed-media assemblages in the mid-1920s they called tattilismo ("Tactilism"), and she was a strong proponent and practitioner of the aeropittura movement after its inception in 1929. She also produced three experimental novels. Cappa's major public work is likely a series of five murals at the Palermo Post Office (1926–1935) for the Fascist public-works architect Angiolo Mazzoni.

== Fascism ==
In early 1918, Marinetti founded the Futurist Political Party, which only a year later merged with Benito Mussolini's Fasci Italiani di Combattimento. Marinetti was one of the first affiliates of the Italian Fascist Party. In 1919, he co-wrote with Alceste De Ambris the Fascist Manifesto, the original manifesto of Italian Fascism. He opposed Fascism's later exaltation of existing institutions, terming them "reactionary". After walking out of the 1920 Fascist party congress in disgust, he withdrew from politics for three years; however, he remained a notable force in developing the party philosophy throughout the regime's existence. For example, at the end of the Congress of Fascist Culture that was held in Bologna on 30 March 1925, Giovanni Gentile addressed Sergio Panunzio on the need to define Fascism more purposefully by way of Marinetti's opinion: "Great spiritual movements make recourse to precision when their primitive inspirations—what F. T. Marinetti identified this morning as artistic, that is to say, the creative and truly innovative ideas, from which the movement derived its first and most potent impulse—have lost their force. We today find ourselves at the very beginning of a new life and we experience with joy this obscure need that fills our hearts—this need that is our inspiration, the genius that governs us and carries us with it."

As part of his campaign to overturn tradition, Marinetti also attacked traditional Italian food. His Manifesto of Futurist Cooking was published in the Turin Gazzetta del Popolo on 28 December 1930. Arguing that "People think, dress[,] and act in accordance with what they drink and eat", Marinetti proposed wide-ranging changes to diet. He condemned pasta, blaming it for lassitude, pessimism, and lack of virility, — and promoted the eating of Italian-grown rice. In that as in other ways, his proposed Futurist cooking was nationalistic by rejecting foreign foods and food names. It was also militaristic by seeking to stimulate men to be fighters.

Marinetti also sought to increase creativity. His attraction to whatever was new made scientific discoveries appealing to him, but his views on diet were not scientifically based. He was fascinated with the idea of processed food, predicted that someday pills would replace food as a source of energy, and called for the creation of "plastic complexes" to replace natural foods. Food, in turn, would become a matter of artistic expression. Many of the meals Marinetti described and ate resemble performance art, such as the "Tactile Dinner", recreated in 2014 for an exhibit at the Guggenheim Museum. Participants wore pajamas decorated with sponge, sandpaper, and aluminum, and ate salads without using cutlery.

During the Fascist regime, Marinetti sought to make Futurism the official state art of Italy but failed to do so. Mussolini was personally uninterested in art and chose to give patronage to numerous styles to keep artists loyal to the regime. Opening the exhibition of art by the Novecento Italiano group in 1923, he said: "I declare that it is far from my idea to encourage anything like a state art. Art belongs to the domain of the individual. The state has only one duty: not to undermine art, to provide humane conditions for artists, to encourage them from the artistic and national point of view." Mussolini's mistress, Margherita Sarfatti, successfully promoted the rival Novecento Group, and even persuaded Marinetti to be part of its board.

In Fascist Italy, modern art was tolerated and even approved by the Fascist hierarchy. Towards the end of the 1930s, some Fascist ideologues (for example, the ex-Futurist Ardengo Soffici) wished to import the concept of "degenerate art" from Germany to Italy and condemned modernism although their demands were ignored by the regime. In 1938, hearing that Adolf Hitler wanted to include Futurism in a traveling exhibition of degenerate art, Marinetti persuaded Mussolini to refuse to let it enter Italy.

On 17 November 1938, Italy passed the Racial Laws, discriminating against Italian Jews, much like the discrimination by Germany pronounced by the Nuremberg Laws. The antisemitic trend in Italy resulted in attacks against modern art, which was judged too foreign, radical and anti-nationalist. In the 11 January 1939 issue of the Futurist journal, Artecrazia, Marinetti expressed his condemnation of such attacks on modern art by noting that Futurism was both Italian and nationalist, not foreign, and stating that there were no Jews in Futurism. Furthermore, he claimed Jews were not active in the development of modern art. Regardless, the Italian state shut down Artecrazia.

Marinetti made numerous attempts to ingratiate himself with the regime by becoming less radical and avant garde with each attempt. He relocated from Milan to Rome. He became an academician despite his condemnation of academies and said, "It is important that Futurism be represented in the Academy".

He was an atheist, but by the mid-1930s, he had come to accept the influence of the Catholic Church on Italian society. In Gazzetta del Popolo, 21 June 1931, Marinetti proclaimed that "Only Futurist artists...are able to express clearly...the simultaneous dogmas of the Catholic faith, such as the Holy Trinity, the Immaculate Conception and Christ's Calvary." In his last works, written just before his death in 1944 L'aeropoema di Gesù ("The Aeropoem of Jesus") and Quarto d'ora di poesia per the X Mas ("A Fifteen Minutes' Poem of the tenth MAS"), Marinetti sought to reconcile his newfound love for God and his passion for the action that accompanied him throughout his life.

Marinetti volunteered for active service in the Second Italo-Abyssinian War and the Second World War, serving on the Eastern Front for a few weeks in the summer and the autumn of 1942 at the age of 65.

He died of cardiac arrest in Bellagio on 2 December 1944 while he was working on a collection of poems praising the wartime achievements of the Decima Flottiglia MAS.

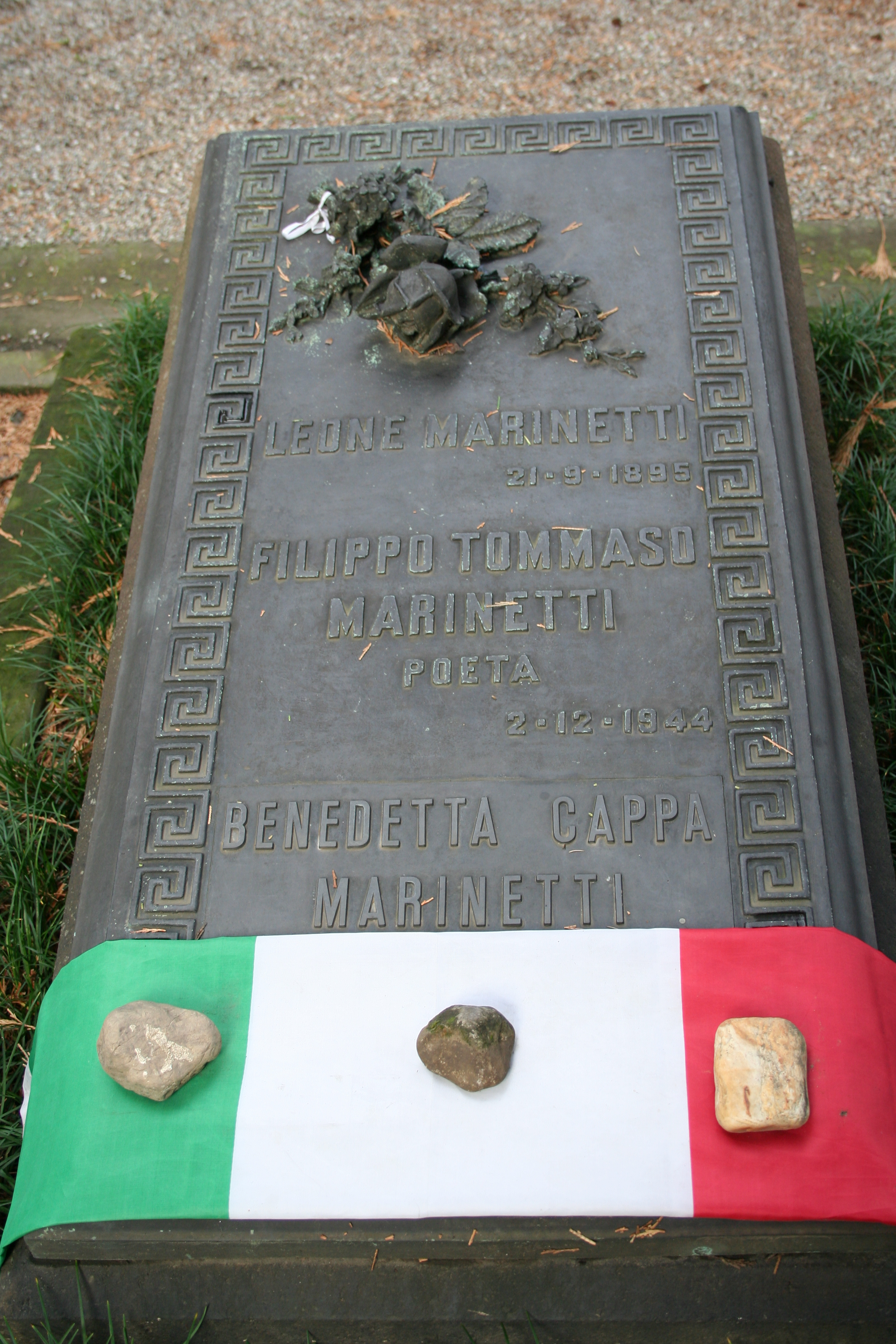
Grave of Filippo Tommaso Marinetti and his wife, Benedetta Cappa, at Monumental Cemetery of Milan (Italy)

== Writings ==
- Marinetti, Filippo Tommaso, Il Fascino dell'Egitto (The Charm of Egypt), A. Mondadori – Editore, 1933, https://archive.org/details/marinetti_fascino_1933A/page/n3/mode/2up, Italian version available online
- Marinetti, Filippo Tommaso: Mafarka the Futurist. An African novel, Middlesex University Press, 1998, ISBN 1-898253-10-2, French version available online
- Marinetti, Filippo Tommaso: Selected Poems and Related Prose, Yale University Press, 2002, ISBN 0-300-04103-9
- Marinetti, Filippo Tommaso: Critical Writings, ed. by Günter Berghaus, New York : Farrar, Straus, and Giroux, 2006, 549p., ISBN 0-374-26083-4, pocket edition 2008: ISBN 0-374-53107-2
- Carlo Schirru, Per un’analisi interlinguistica d’epoca: Grazia Deledda e contemporanei, Rivista Italiana di Linguistica e di Dialettologia, Fabrizio Serra editore, Pisa-Roma, Anno XI, 2009, pp. 9–32
- Filippo Tommaso Marinetti, Le Futurisme, textes annotés et préfacés par Giovanni Lista, L’Age d’Homme, Lausanne, 1980
- Filippo Tommaso Marinetti, Les Mots en liberté futuristes, préfacés par Giovanni Lista, L’Age d’Homme, Lausanne, 1987
- Giovanni Lista, F. T. Marinetti, Éditions Seghers, Paris, 1976
- Marinetti et le futurisme, poèmes, études, documents, iconographie, réunis et préfacés par Giovanni Lista, bibliographie établie par Giovanni Lista, L’Age d’Homme, Lausanne, 1977
- Giovanni Lista, F. T. Marinetti, l’anarchiste du futurisme, Éditions Séguier, Paris, 1995
- Giovanni Lista, Le Futurisme : création et avant-garde, Éditions L’Amateur, Paris, 2001
- Giovanni Lista, Le Futurisme, une avant-garde radicale, coll. "Découvertes Gallimard" (n° 533), Éditions Gallimard, Paris, 2008.
- Giovanni Lista, Journal des Futurismes, Éditions Hazan, coll. "Bibliothèque", Paris, 2008 (ISBN 978-2-7541-0208-7)
- Antonino Reitano, L'onore, la patria e la fede nell'ultimo Marinetti, Angelo Parisi Editore, 2006
- Barbara Meazzi, Il fantasma del romanzo. Le futurisme italien et l'écriture romanesque (1909–1929), Chambéry, Presses universitaires Savoie Mont Blanc, 2021, 430 pp., ISBN 9782377410590
