= Heating plant =

Infrastructure for generating thermal energy for use in district heating

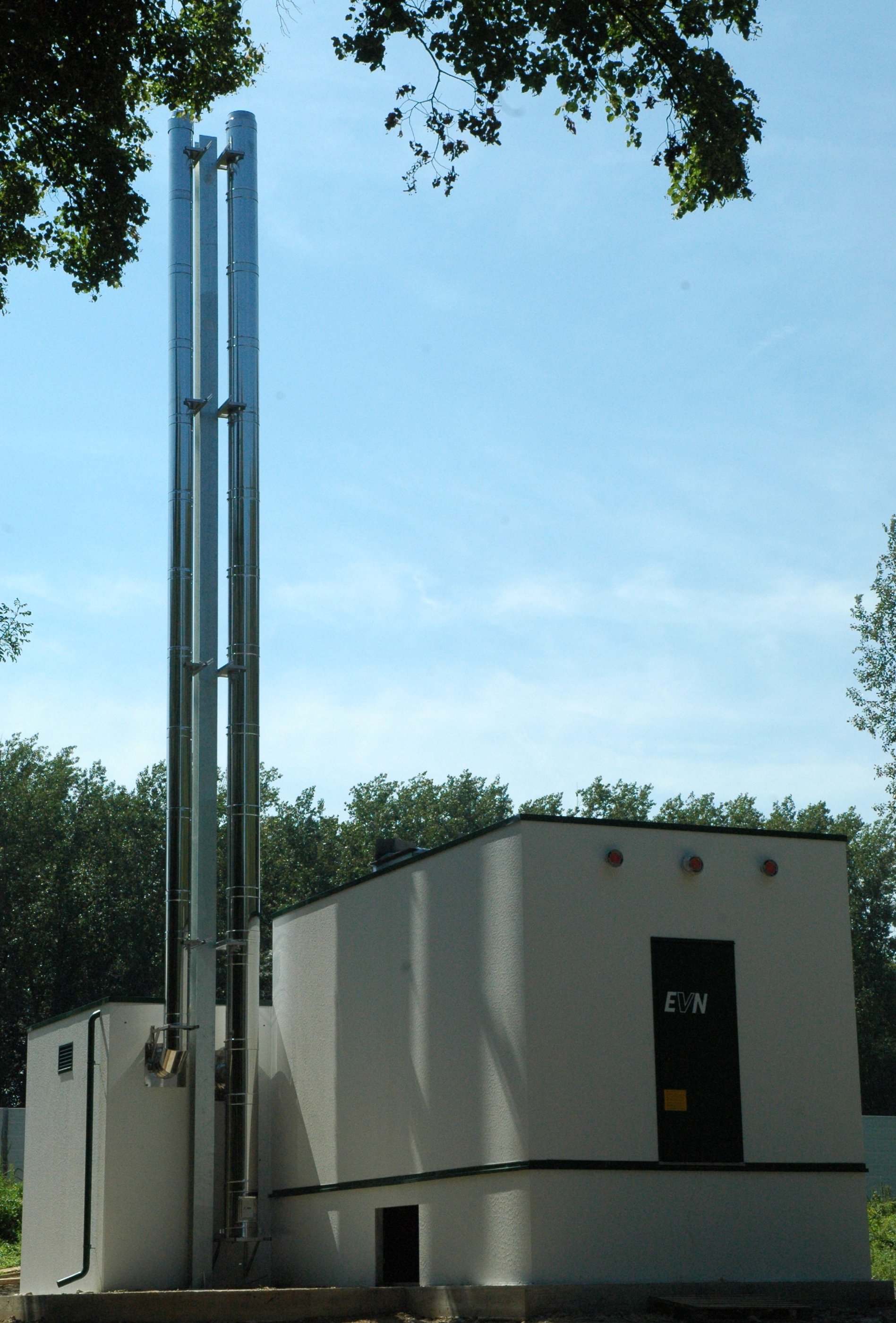
Heating plant with one biomass and one natural gas-fired boiler, total heat power 1000kW from Austria

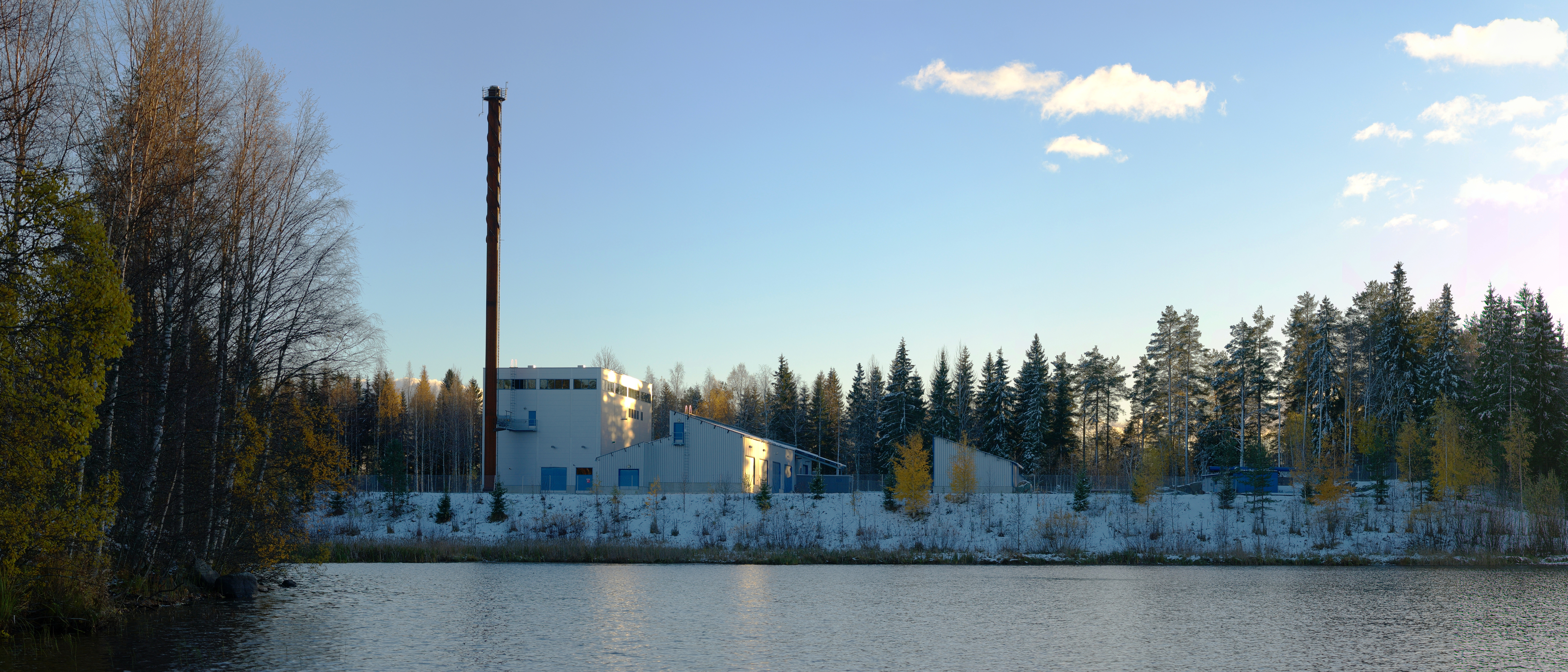
Tiprusniemi Heating Plant in Siilinjärvi, Finland

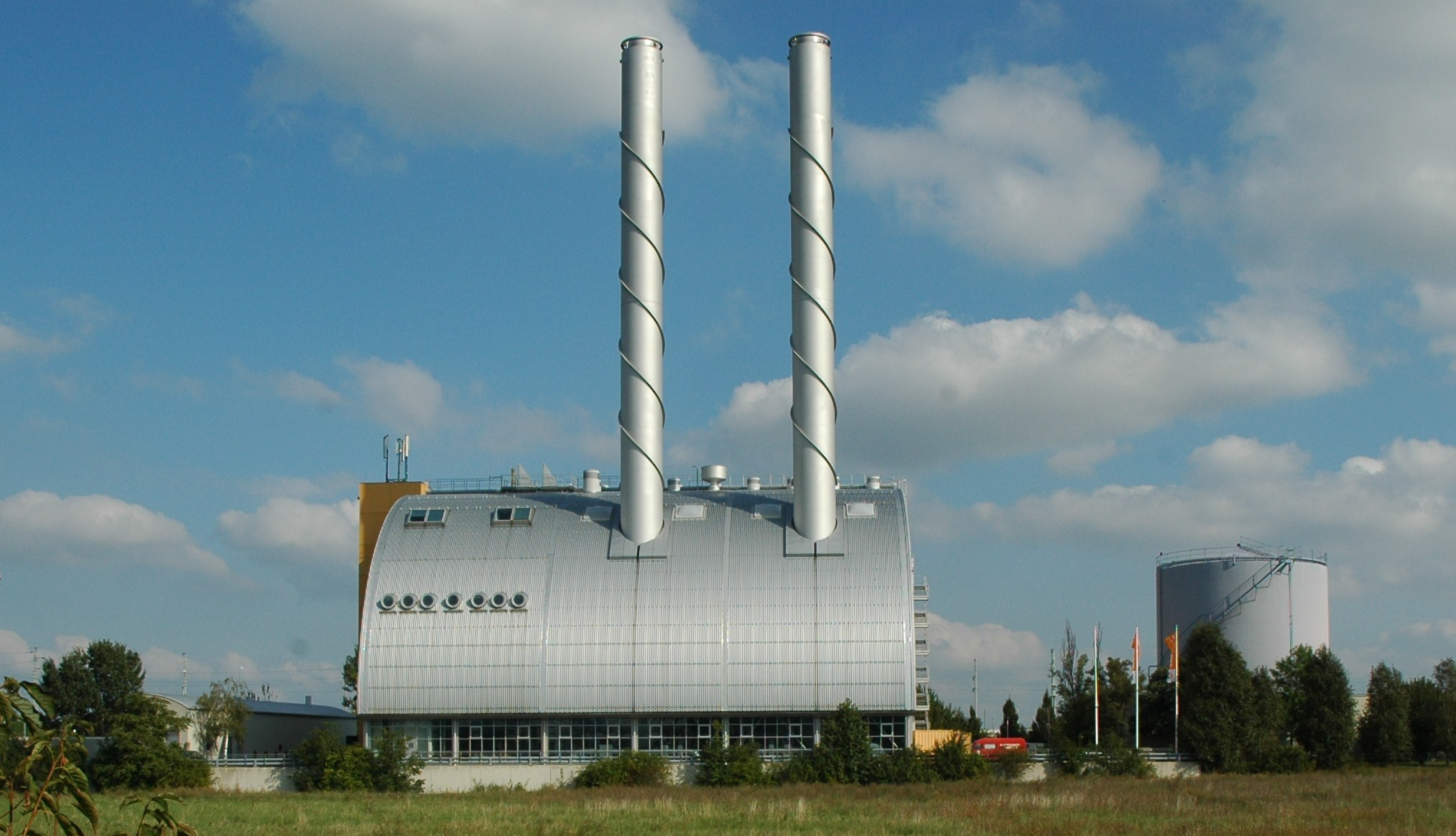
The largest Austrian fossil fired district heating plant. Total heat power 358,000 kW.

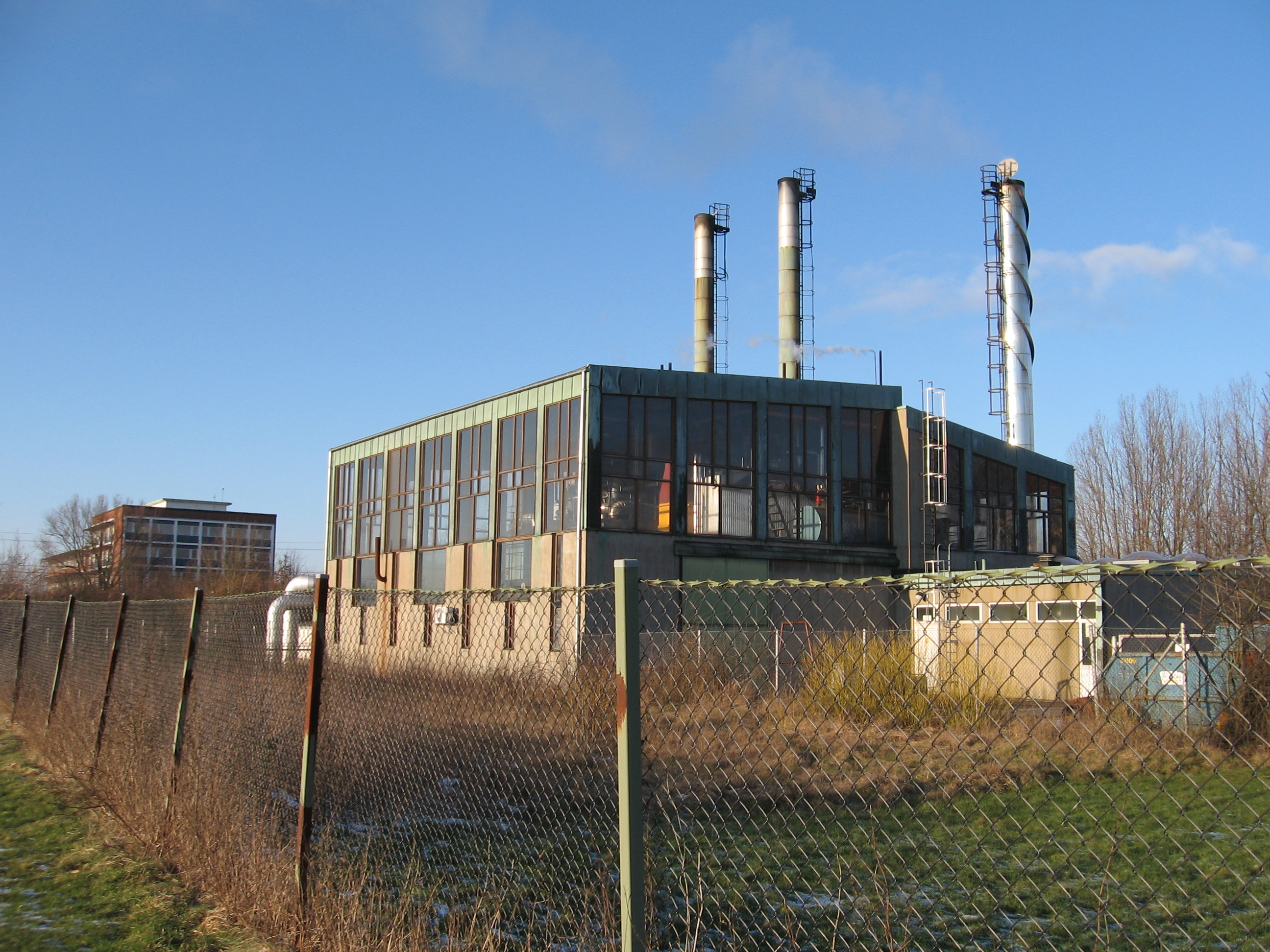
Heating plant in Lund

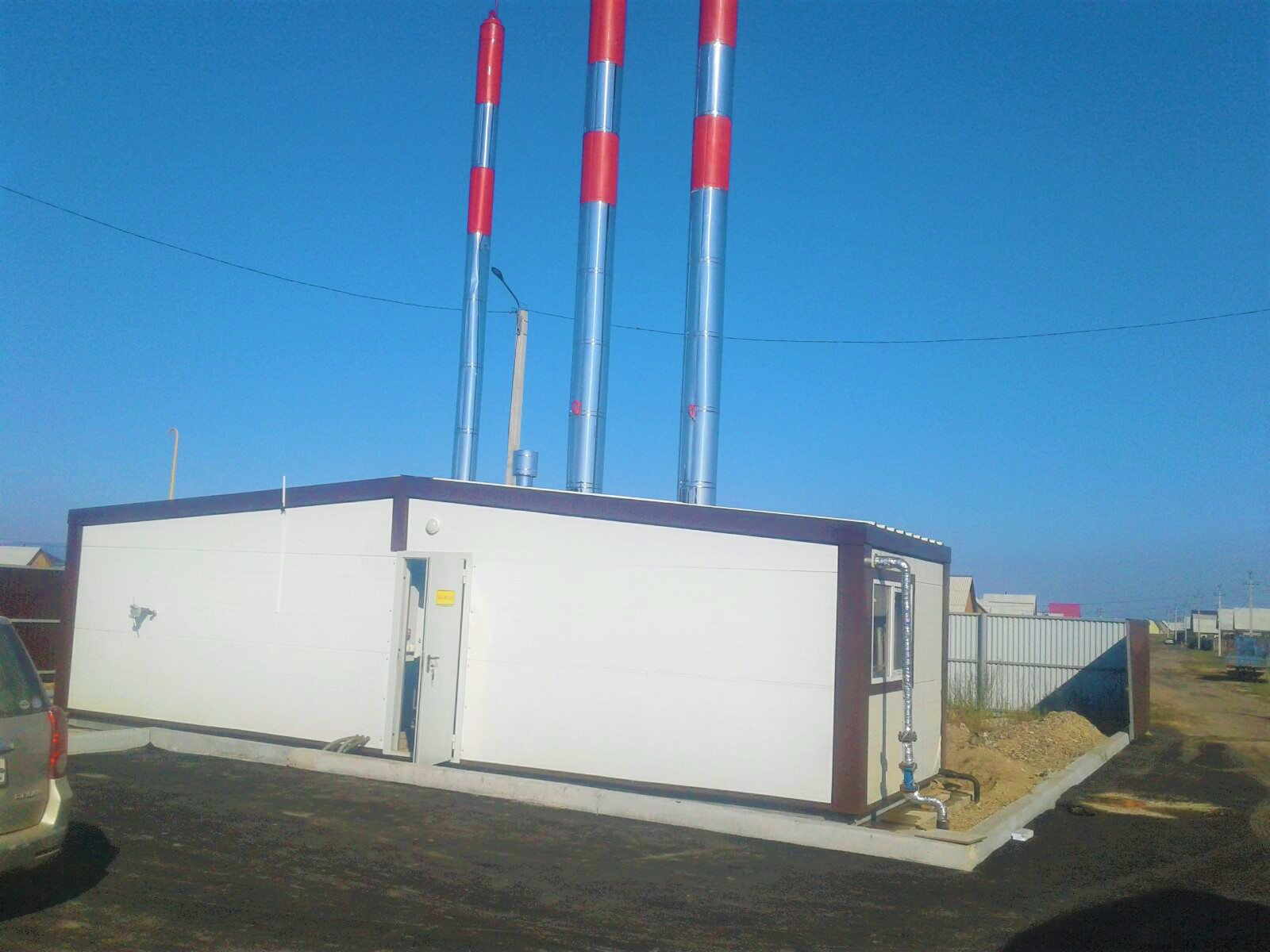
Gas boiler room in a school in Buryatia, Russia

A heating plant, also called a physical plant, or steam plant, generates thermal energy in the form of steam for use in district heating applications. Unlike combined heat and power installations which produce thermal energy as a by-product of electricity generation, heating plants are dedicated to generating heat for use in various processes.

Heating plants are commonly used at hospital or university campuses, military bases, office tower complexes, and public housing complexes. The plant will generate steam which is distributed to each building where it is used to make domestic hot water for human consumption, heating hot water in the case of hydronic heating systems, air conditioning through the use of absorption refrigeration units, air heating in HVAC units, humidification, industrial laundry systems, or sterilization at hospitals. The steam may be sold to each customer and billed through the use of a steam flow meter.

They feature boilers, either water tube or fire tube, which generate steam for various uses and demands. The plant also hosts all of the boiler auxiliaries such as water treatment equipment, air handling, fuel handling, controls, instrument air, and various other plant systems which support the production of steam.

The heating plant can use different fuels:

- Natural gas
- Heating oil
- Biomass
- Coal
- Refuse

== Notable heating plants ==
- Central Heating Plant, Washington, D.C., US
- Heating plant and main controls cabin, Florence, Italy
- Western Kentucky University Heating Plant, Kentucky, US

== See also ==
- Combined heat and power
- Cogeneration
- District heating
- Power station
