= Century City Medical Plaza =

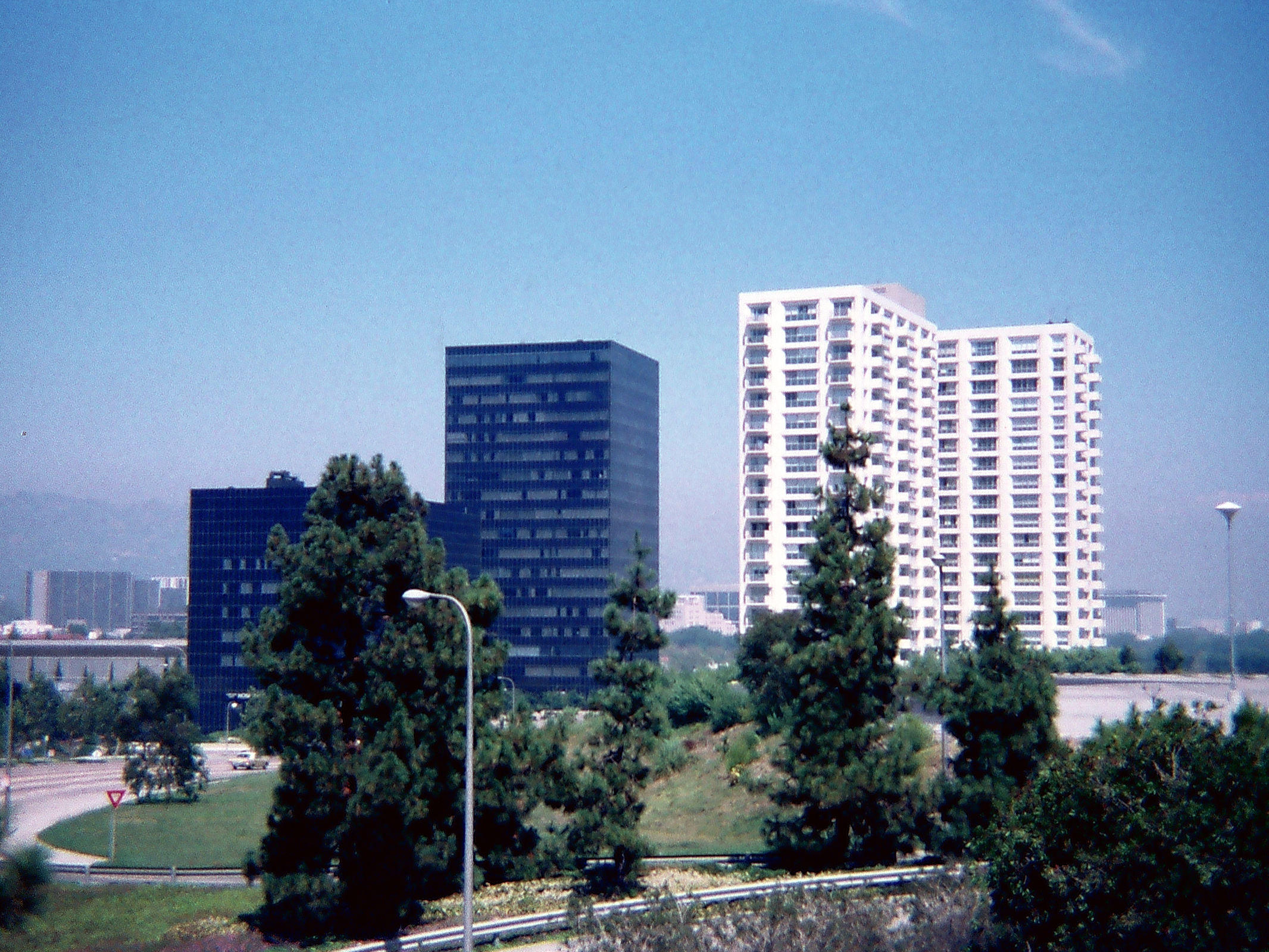
- Century City Medical Plaza (black towers), 1978.

General information
- Type: Office tower; hospital
- Architectural style: Late Modern architecture
- Location: 2070-2080 Century Park East, Century City, Los Angeles, California 90067
- Completed: 1969

Design and construction
- Architects: Anthony J. Lumsden & César Pelli
- Developer: Realtech Construction Co.

Website
- ccmpla.com

The Century City Medical Plaza is a landmark set of two buildings in Century City, Los Angeles, California.

== Location ==
The building is located at 2070-2080 Century Park East in Century City, on the West side of Los Angeles in California.

== History ==
It was designed in the Late Modern architectural style by architects Anthony J. Lumsden and César Pelli. Construction was completed in 1969. It is made up of two buildings: a seventeen-story office tower, and a ten-story hospital. The plaza originally housed Century City Hospital, which was owned by Tenet Healthcare Corporation. Tenet closed the hospital in 2004 as it sold it to Salus Surgical Group. The hospital was renamed as Century City Doctors Hospital, which closed in 2008 after filing for bankruptcy. In late 2016, the hospital was remodeled and re-opened as California Rehabilitation Institute, owned by Select Medical, providing inpatient rehabilitation including: physical therapy, occupational therapy, speech therapy, recreational therapy, and neuropsychology .

== Heritage significance ==
The two buildings resemble two large black boxes made of skin glass. The mullions are reversed, thus playing on the idea of deconstructing the traditional architectural feature of columns. They were the first two buildings to be entirely enclosed in glass skin. This architectural style became a feature of "corporate architecture" for the next twenty years.
