= Wilstein =

Wilstein is a surname. Notable people with the surname include:

- David Wilstein (1928–2017), American real estate developer and philanthropist
- Steve Wilstein (born 1948), American sportswriter, author, and photographer
