= Roxbury Plaza =

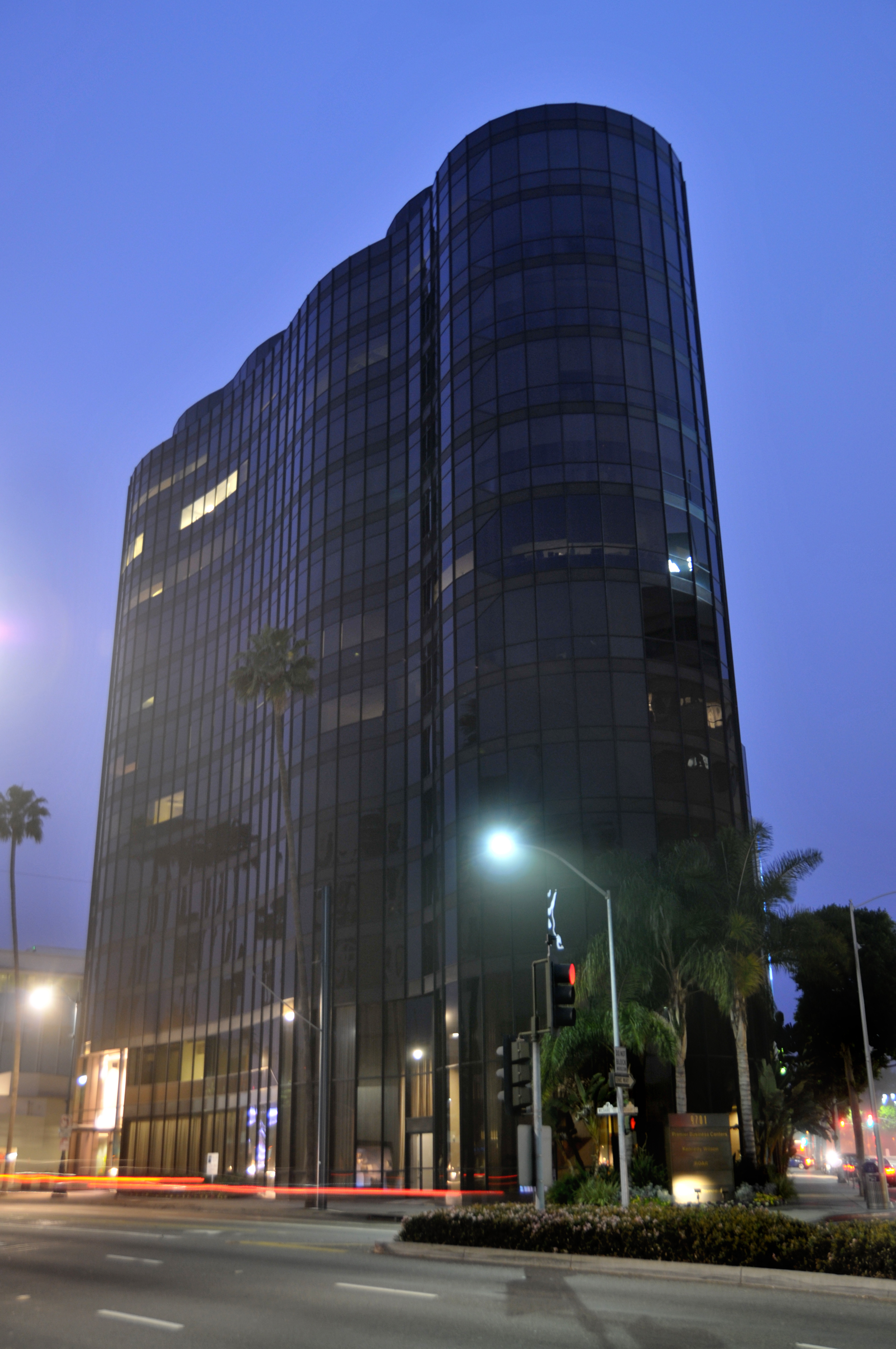
- Former names: Manufacturers Bank

General information
- Type: Office tower
- Architectural style: Structural Expressionism
- Location: 9701 Wilshire Boulevard, Beverly Hills, California 90212
- Completed: 1974

Design and construction
- Architect: Anthony J. Lumsden
- Developer: Realtech Construction Co.

The Roxbury Plaza (a.k.a. Manufacturers Bank and Roar Building) is a landmark building and thirteen-floor office tower in Beverly Hills, California.

== Location ==
It is located at 9701 on Wilshire Boulevard in Beverly Hills, California.

== History ==
It was designed in the Late Modern architectural style by renowned architect Anthony J. Lumsden (1928–2011). Construction was completed in 1974. Lumsden subsequently received the First Honor Award from the Society of American Registered Architects for his work.

Originally known as the Manufacturers Bank, it is now called the Roxbury Plaza.
