= Hyperion sewage treatment plant =

Sewage treatment facility in Los Angeles, California

Coordinates: 33°55′30″N 118°25′47″W

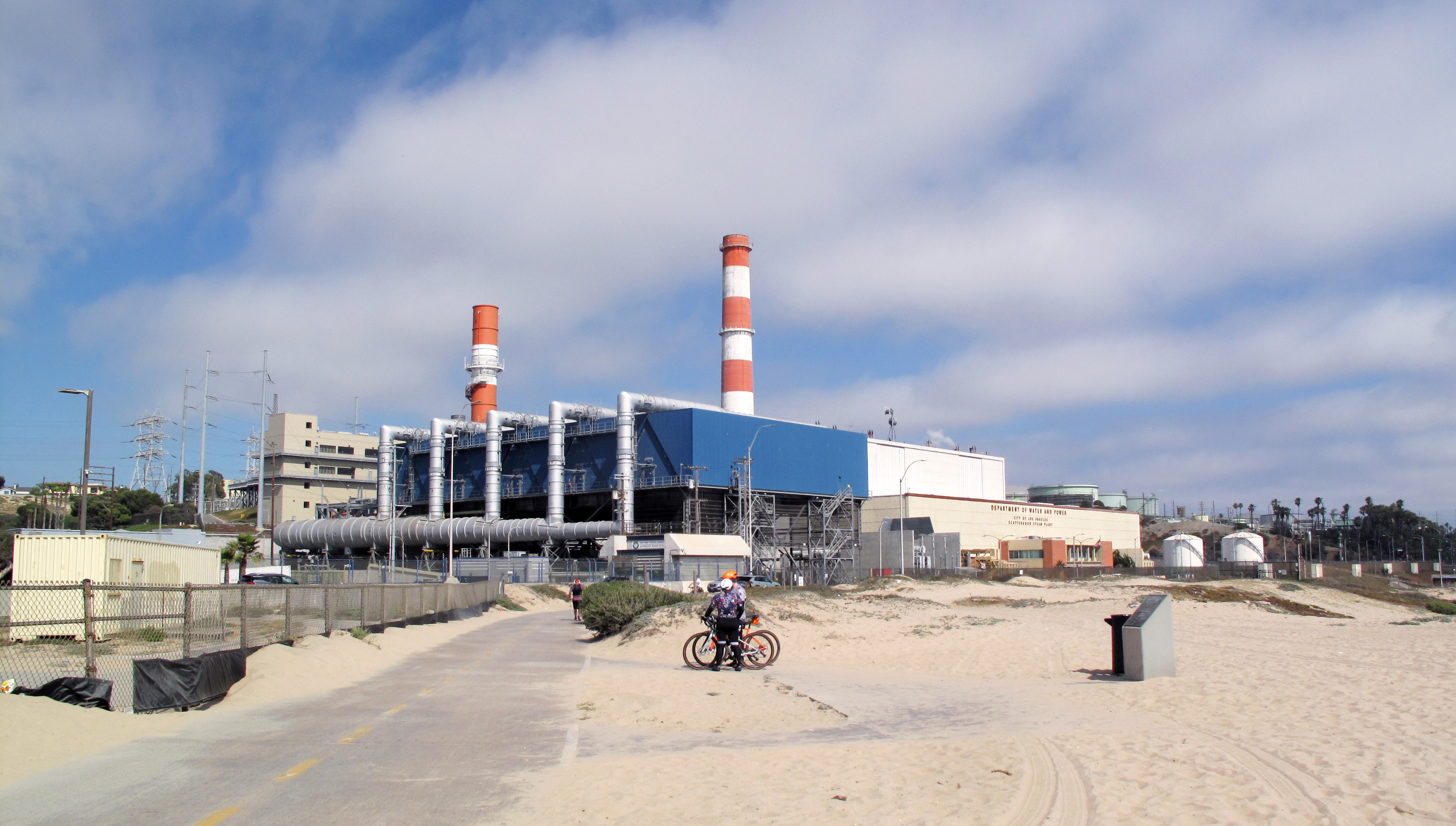
View of the Hyperion Sewage Treatment Plant from the Marvin Braude Bike Trail

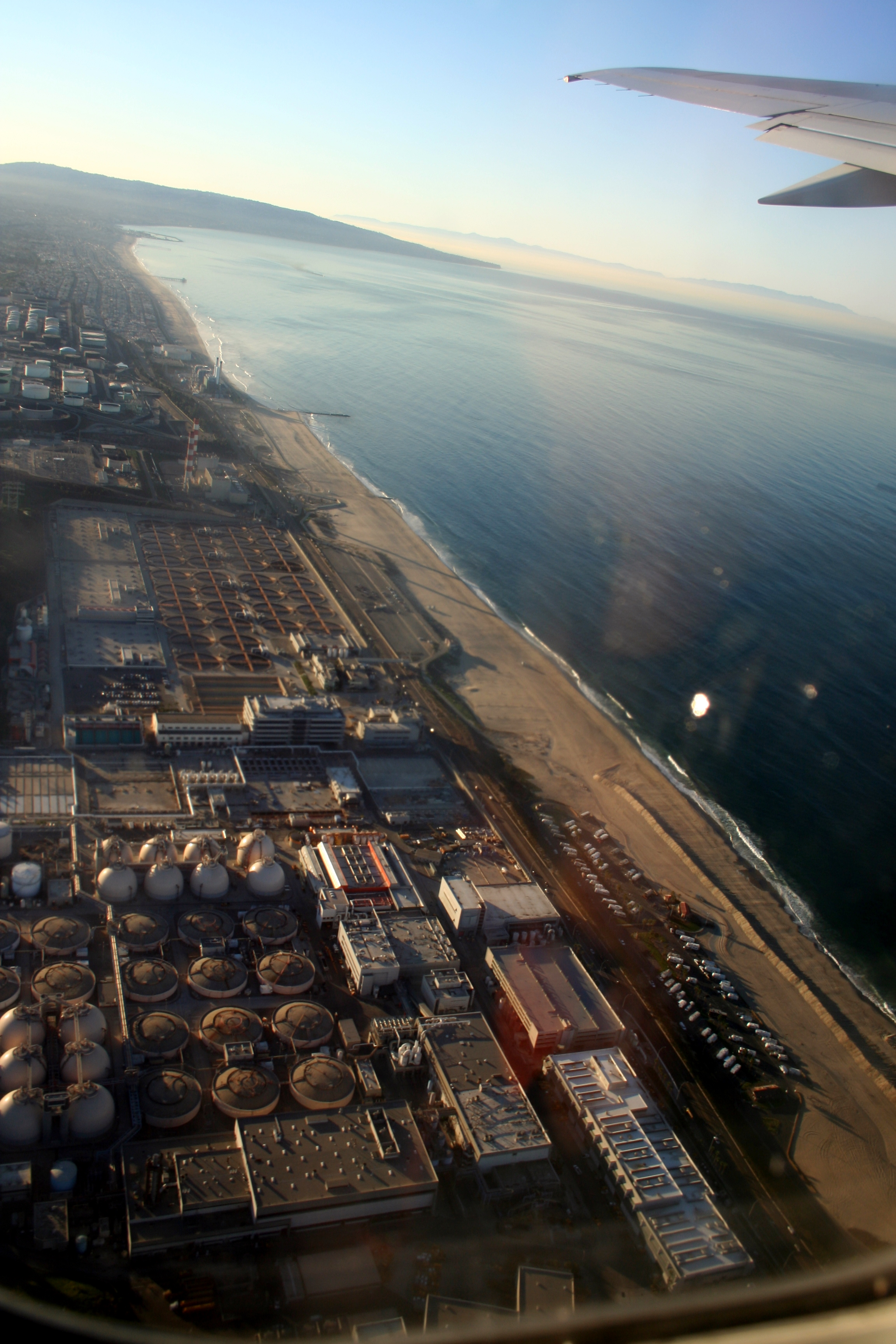
The Hyperion Water Reclamation Plant from the air

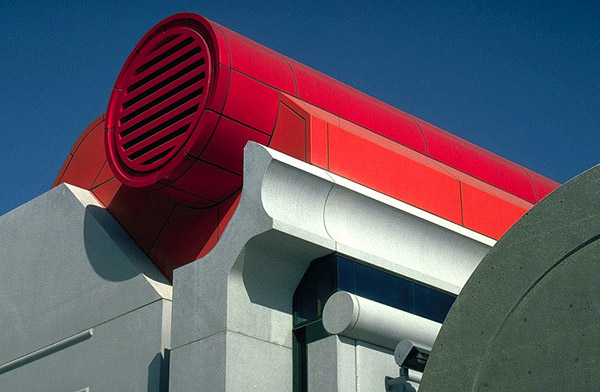
Detail of one of the plant buildings designed by Anthony J Lumsden, FAIA.

The Hyperion Water Reclamation Plant is a sewage treatment plant in southwest Los Angeles, California, next to Dockweiler State Beach on Santa Monica Bay. The plant is the largest sewage treatment facility in the Los Angeles Metropolitan Area and one of the largest plants in the world. Hyperion is operated by the City of Los Angeles, Department of Public Works, and the Bureau of Sanitation. Hyperion is the largest sewage plant by volume west of the Mississippi River.

Los Angeles City Sanitation (LASAN) operates the largest wastewater collection system in the US, serving a population of four million within a 600 square miles (1,600 km^{2}) service area. The city's more than 6,700 miles (10,800 km) of public sewers convey 400 million gallons per day of flow from customers to its four plants.

The city's wastewater system - sewers and treatment plants - operates 24 hours a day, 365 days a year to serve the needs of more than four million customers in Los Angeles, plus 29 contracting cities and agencies. There are ongoing construction projects to ensure service remains available to all of the residents in the City of Los Angeles.

== History ==
Until 1925, raw sewage from Los Angeles was discharged untreated directly into Santa Monica Bay in the region of the Hyperion Treatment Plant.

With the population increase, the amount of sewage became a major problem to the beaches, so in 1925 the city built a simple screening plant in the 200 acres (0.81 km^{2}) it had acquired in 1892.

Even with the screening plant, the quality of the water in Santa Monica Bay was unacceptable, and in 1950 Los Angeles opened the Hyperion Treatment Plant with full secondary treatment processes. In addition, the new plant included capture of biogas from anaerobic digesters to produce heat dried fertilizer.

In order to keep up with the increase of influent wastewater produced by the ever-growing city of Los Angeles, by 1957 the plant engineers had cut back treatment levels and increased the discharge of a blend of primary and secondary effluent through a five-mile (8.0 km) pipe into the ocean. They also opted to halt the production of fertilizers and started discharging digested sludge into the Santa Monica Bay through a seven-mile (11 km) pipe.

Marine life in Santa Monica Bay suffered from the continuous discharge of 25 million pounds (11 kt) of sludge per month. Samples of the ocean floor where sludge had been discharged for 30 years demonstrated that the only living creatures were worms and a hardy species of clam. Additionally, coastal monitoring revealed that bay waters often did not meet quality standards as the result of Hyperion's effluent. These issues resulted in the city entering into a consent decree with the United States Environmental Protection Agency and the California State Water Resources Control Board to build significant facility upgrades at Hyperion. In 1980, the city launched a massive "sludge-out" project that upgraded the plant to full secondary treatment. Sludge digesters are used to destroy the disease-causing organisms (pathogens). The sludge-out portion of the program was completed in 1987.

The $1.6 billion sludge-out to full secondary construction program replaced nearly every 1950-vintage wastewater processing system at Hyperion while the plant continuously treated 350 million U.S. gallons (1.3 billion liters) per day and met all of its NPDES permit requirements. As of 2016 the plant can treat 450 million U.S. gallons (1.7 billion liters) per day, with a peak wet weather flow (partial treatment during storms) of 800 million U.S. gallons (3.0 billion liters) per day.

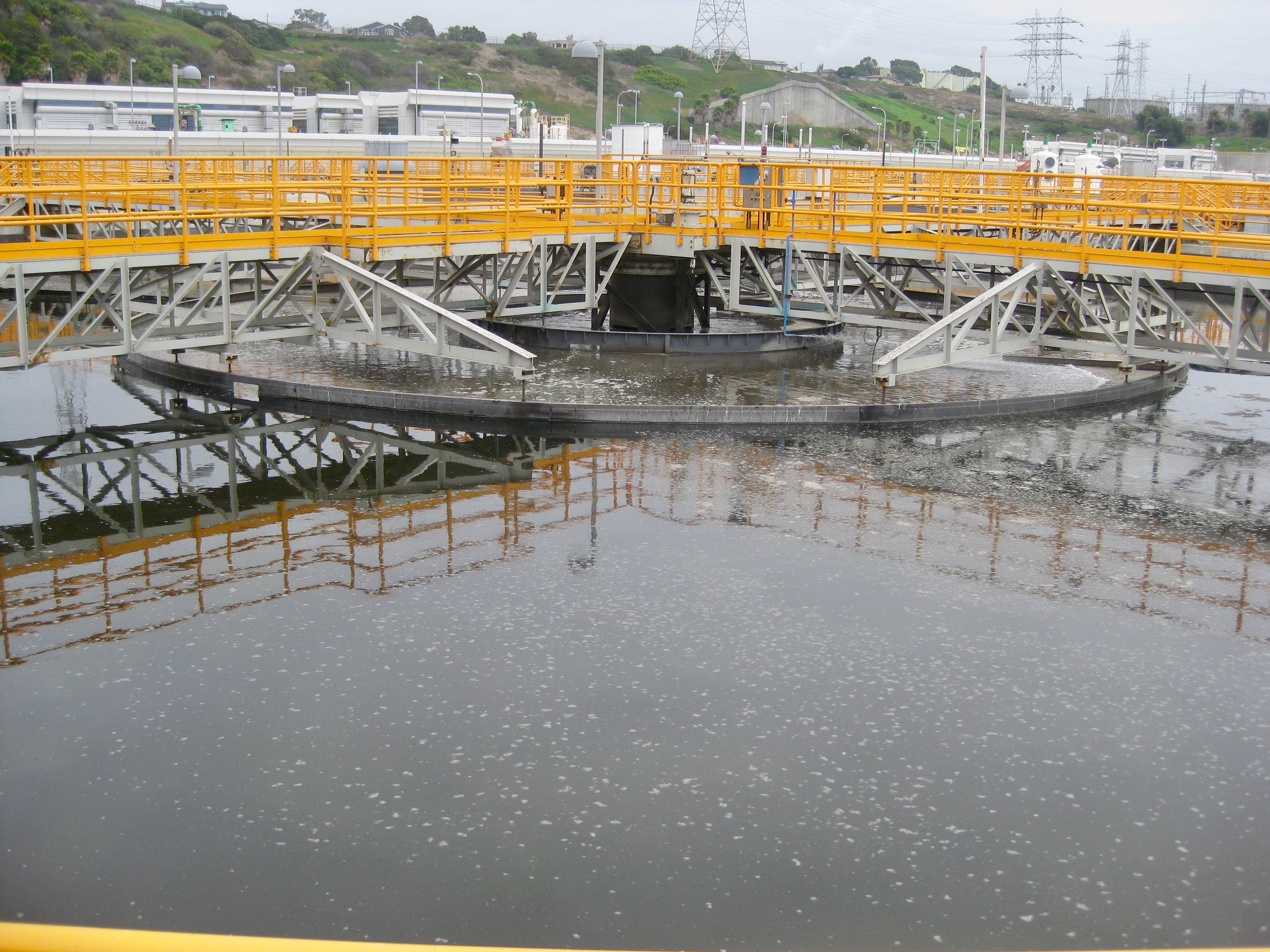
Water going through cleaning process at the Hyperion sewage treatment plant. A majority of the water can be reclaimed, and water that is not clean enough goes to the ocean.

The West Basin Municipal Water District purchases approximately 37,600 acre-feet (46.4 billion liters), or roughly 9 percent, of Hyperion's secondary effluent for treatment at the Edward C. Little Water Recycling Facility.

== Reclaimed water ==
Hyperion sewage plant treats approximately 250 million U.S. gallons (950 million liters) of wastewater on a day-to-day basis. Treating this much water on a daily basis takes a lot of energy. The plant has cut costs with its own power plant that uses methane gas gathered from the waste to fuel the plant, saving money. Some of the wastewater is used for landscape irrigation, industrial processes, and groundwater replenishment.

== Environmental impacts ==
Heal the Bay, an environmental advocacy group, was founded in 1985 to address ongoing water quality problems at Hyperion. The group's original goal was to keep neighboring ocean water near the plant clean. At the time Hyperion was discharging used syringes, condoms, and tampons into the ocean through a pipeline, causing harmful effects on the ocean's ecosystem, people visiting the beach, and surfers. It took two years to hold Hyperion accountable for its actions, and it took 12 years, at a cost of $12.6 billion, to have the plant discharge cleaner effluent into Santa Monica Bay. After this large-scale overhaul of the plant, Hyperion was complying with EPA and California regulations.

Heal the Bay provided information to the public in 2017 when Hyperion was undergoing maintenance work on a 5-mile (8.0 km) pipeline that goes into the ocean. During this time, the plant used its emergency pipeline. This had negative impacts on local beaches such as a rise in chlorine and bacteria levels for two months.

== In popular culture ==
Because of its hyper-industrial appearance and its location within the thirty-mile (48 km) "studio zone", the Hyperion plant has been used numerous times as a location for feature films and television shows, among them Battle for the Planet of the Apes, the final scene in the 1972 Vampire movie Blacula, and The Terminator. And "The TV Series "Buck Roger's in the 21st Century"
