= San Francisco Marriott Marquis =

Hotel in San Francisco, California

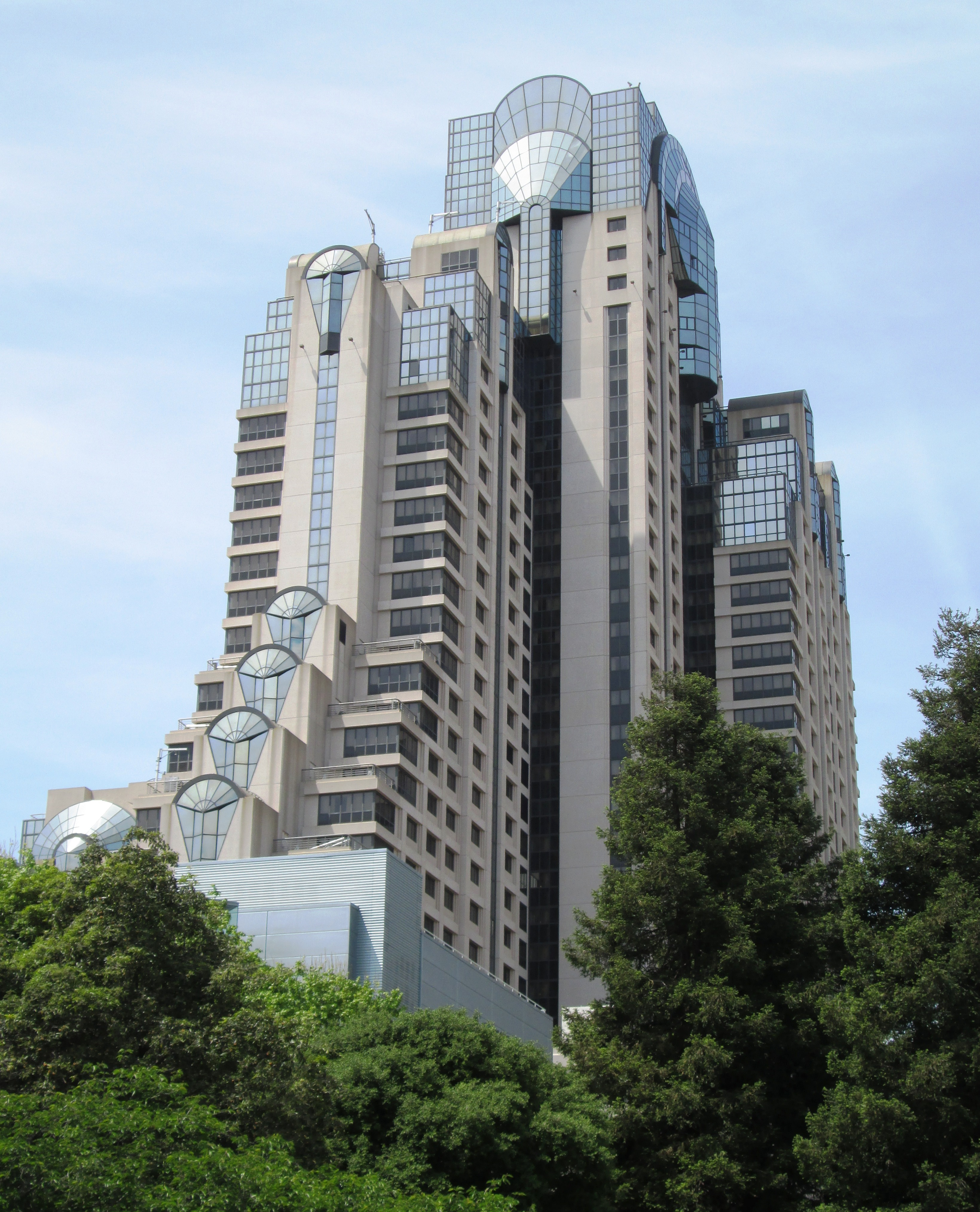
- The building's exterior in 2017

- Location within San Francisco
- Hotel chain: Marriott Corporation

General information
- Location: United States, 55 Fourth Street; San Francisco, California
- Coordinates: 37.7849°N 122.4043°W
- Opening: October 17, 1989
- Cost: US$150 million
- Owner: Host Hotels & Resorts
- Operator: Marriott International

Height
- Height: 132.89 m (436.0 ft)

Technical details
- Floor count: 39

Design and construction
- Architects: Zeidler Partnership Architects; Daniel Mann Johnson & Mendenhall; Anthony J. Lumsden; Martin Middlebrook Louie

Other information
- Number of rooms: 1,362
- Number of suites: 137
- Number of restaurants: Bin 55; Mission Grille (closed); Fourth Street Bar & Grille (closed); The View "Mission Street Pantry" (opened 2015)
- Parking: US$13 hourly / US$58.14 daily

Website
- http://www.marriott.com/hotels/travel/sfodt-san-francisco-marriott-marquis/

The San Francisco Marriott Marquis is a 133 m (436 ft) 39-story skyscraper in the South of Market neighborhood of San Francisco, California. Situated at the intersection of Fourth and Mission Streets, across from the Metreon and Moscone Convention Center, the building is recognizable by the distinctive postmodern appearance of its high-rise tower. The building was completed in 1989, and contains 1,500 hotel rooms. The original architectural firm Zeidler Partnership Architects was replaced by DMJM architect Anthony J Lumsden, who gave the building its overall architectural style. The San Francisco Marriott is the second tallest hotel in San Francisco, after Hilton San Francisco Tower I.

== History ==
The hotel was at the heart of the city of San Francisco's development of the central blocks in the South of Market area during the late 1970s and early 1980s. The city had put out an invitation to property developers to come up with ideas for the area. Ten developers originally responded and the eventual proposal chosen - in October 1980 - was a joint effort by Marriott together with the Canadian property developers Olympia and York.

The Marriott Marquis opened on October 17, 1989, the day of the Loma Prieta earthquake. With better earthquake proofing than several nearby hotels, the building only lost a single window.

=== 2024 strike ===
On November 24, 2024, about 500 employees at the San Francisco Marriot Marquis, who are also members of UNITE HERE's Local 2 chapter, went on strike. As of December 2, 2024, the strike remained ongoing, and was also expected to last past the upcoming holidays. On December 24, 2024, a four-year labor agreement was ratified, thus bringing the strike to an end.

== In popular culture ==
Local newspaper columnist Herb Caen complained that reflections from the hotel's windows blinded him in his office at the nearby Chronicle building, and compared its shape to that of a jukebox.

== See also ==
- List of tallest buildings in San Francisco
