= David Wilstein =

American real estate developer

- Born: March 8, 1928; Pittsburgh, Pennsylvania, U.S.
- Died: July 9, 2017 (aged 89); Beverly Hills, California, U.S.
- Resting place: Hillside Memorial Park Cemetery
- Education: University of Pittsburgh
- Occupations: Real estate developer, philanthropist
- Spouse: Susan Wilstein
- Children: 1 daughter

David Wilstein (March 8, 1928 – July 9, 2017) was an American real estate developer and philanthropist. He was the founder of Realtech Construction Co. He developed over 100 buildings in Los Angeles as well as in Japan, Thailand, Turkey and China. Wilstein supported charitable causes in Los Angeles and Israel.

== Early life ==
David Wilstein was born on March 8, 1928, in Pittsburgh, Pennsylvania. He had a brother, Leonard. He graduated from the University of Pittsburgh, where he earned a bachelor's degree in engineering.

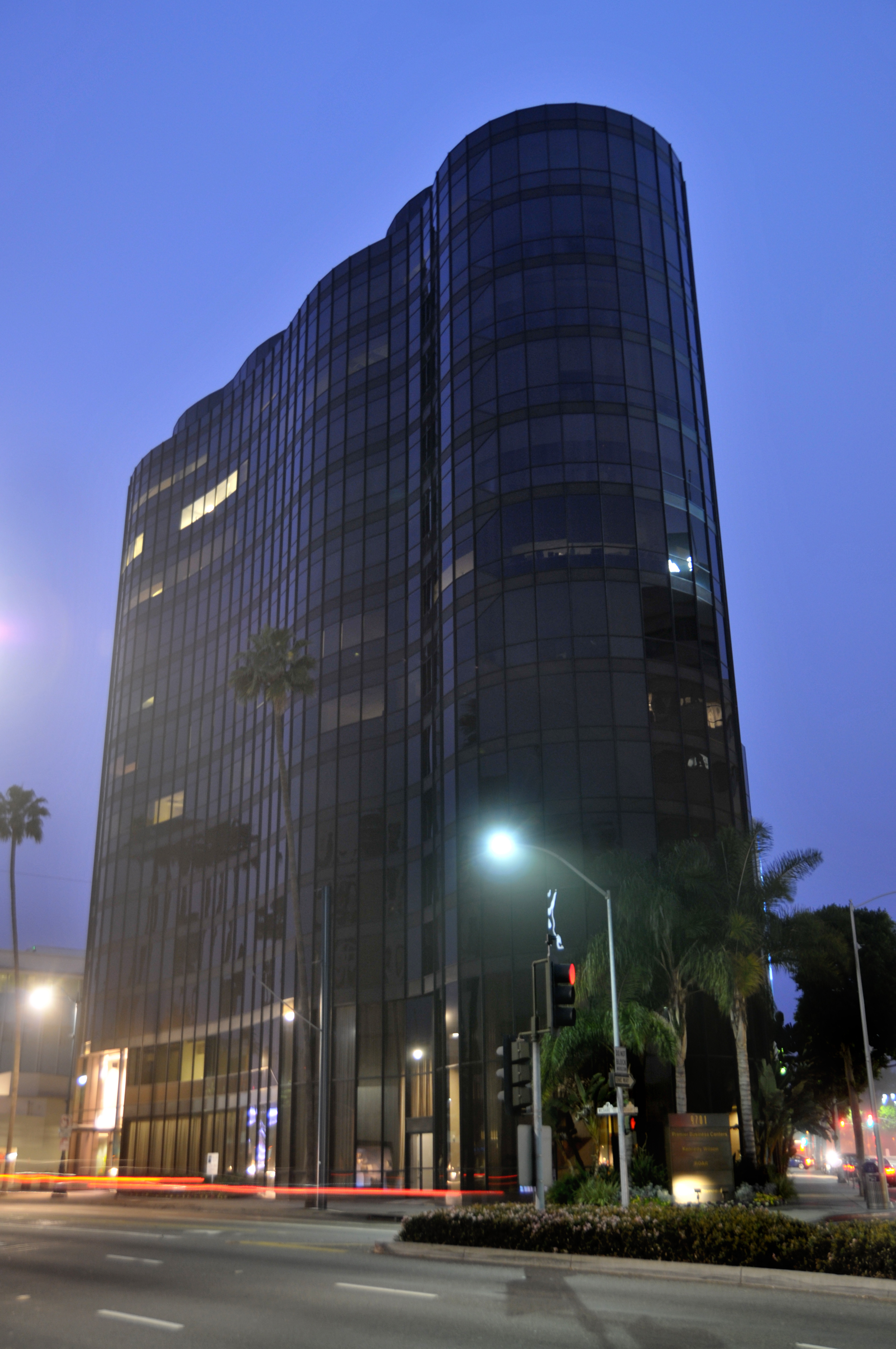
The Roar Building, also known as the Roxbury Plaza, in Beverly Hills, California

== Career ==
Wilstein began his career by designing freeways in the 1950s.

In 1976, Wilstein founded Realtech Construction Co., a real estate development company, with his brother Leonard. He first developed a building for an investor from Cuba, with the promise of a "6% or 7% return." He later developed the 12-story Roar Building on the corner of Wilshire Boulevard and Roxbury Drive in Beverly Hills the Los Feliz Towers, and the 25-story Wells Fargo Center on the corner of Wilshire Boulevard and San Vicente Boulevard in Brentwood. Additionally, he designed the Century City Medical Plaza, whose penthouse his office was based in. He also developed buildings in Japan, Thailand, Turkey and China.

Over the course of his career, Wilstein developed over 100 buildings.

== Philanthropy ==
Wilstein made charitable contributions to causes in Los Angeles and Israel. He served on the boards of directors of the California State University, the Cedars-Sinai Medical Center, the Brandeis-Bardin Institute and the American Friends of the Hebrew University of Jerusalem.

== Personal life and death ==
Wilstein married his wife, Susan, in the 1950s. They had a daughter, Denise Margolin. He resided in Beverly Hills, California, and he was Jewish.

Wilstein died on July 9, 2017, at the age of 89. He was buried at the Hillside Memorial Park Cemetery on July 13, 2017.
