= Heating plant and main controls cabin, Florence =

Heating plant and main controls cabin at Santa Maria Novella railway station
- Centrale termica e Cabina apparati centrali della Stazione Santa Maria Novella
- Interactive map of the Heating plant and main controls cabin at Santa Maria Novella railway station area

General information
- Architectural style: Futurist architecture
- Location: Florence, Italy
- Coordinates: 43°46′53.96″N 11°14′41.77″E
- Construction started: 1933
- Completed: 1935

Design and construction
- Architect: Angiolo Mazzoni

The Heating plant and main controls cabin is a technical facilities building in Firenze Santa Maria Novella railway station designed by architect Angiolo Mazzoni in 1929. The complex has been called "the greatest masterpiece of Futurist-Constructivist-Modernist architecture".

== History ==
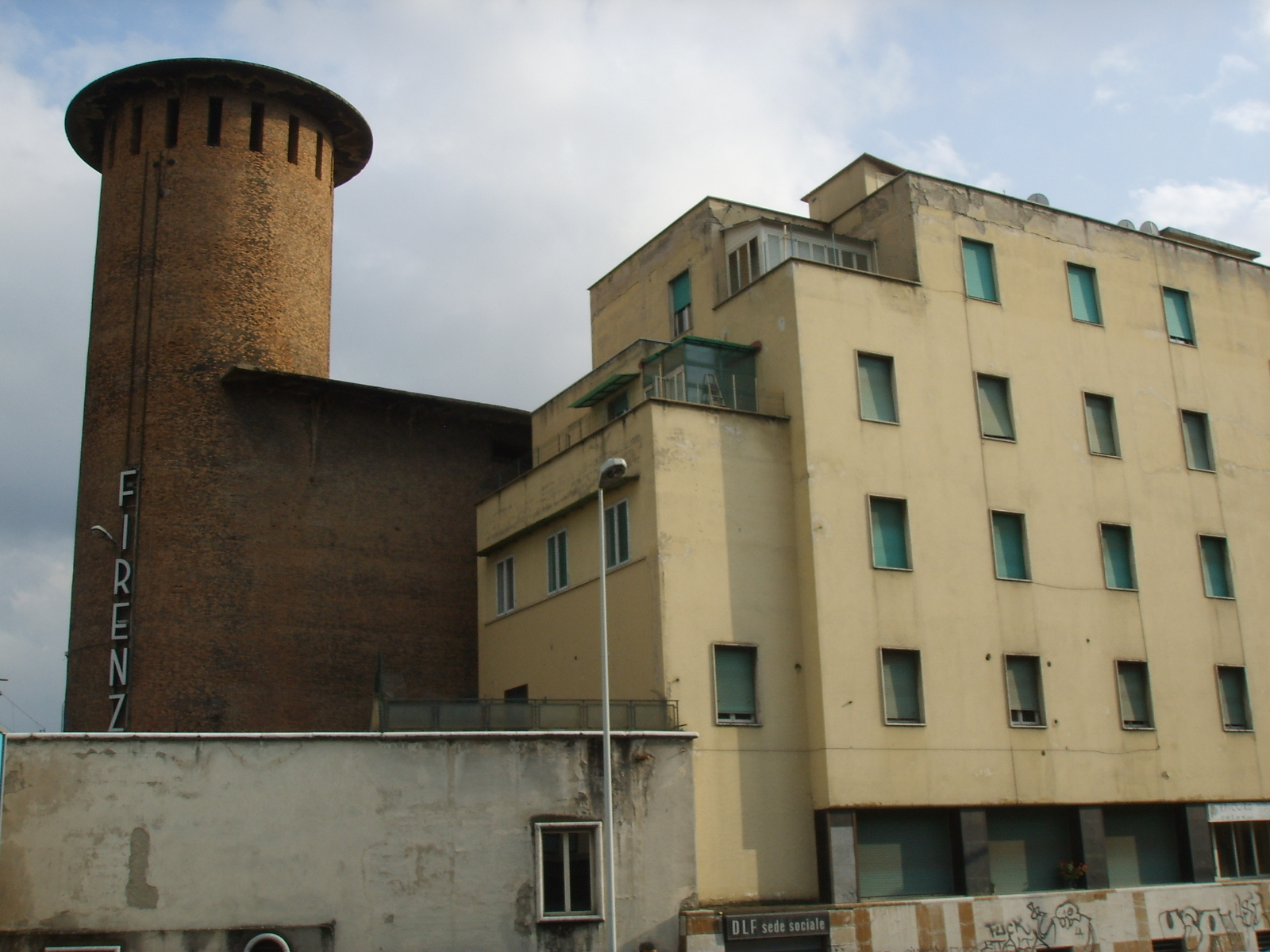
The Squadra Rialzo building and the water tower also are part of the plan around the new station and designed by Mazzoni

The heating plant and main controls cabin of Firenze Santa Maria Novella railway station were planned between 1927 and 1929, before the construction of the new station from 1933. At that time Mazzoni was assigned to the Projects and Construction division of the Ferrovie dello Stato (Italian State Railways). The heating plant was part of a bigger plan that included the Post Office in via Alamanni, the recreational club for state railways workers, the Squadra Rialzo building and the overpass on viale Umberto I (today viale Fratelli Rosselli).

The heating plant was designed to house four boilerplates for the new station central heating system. The main controls cabin's primary purpose was to house the railroad switches control tower.

The commission for the heating plant was officially granted to Mazzoni in 1929. Later he was also charged with the main controls cabin, so he then developed a solution to join the two blocks. The project was approved on 9 February 1932 by decree by Costanzo Ciano, minister of postal and telegraph services, as a correlated work for the new station with an 11,500,000 £ budget.

In 1933, Mazzoni gained second place in the competition for the Santa Maria Novella station, equal with Sot-Sass, Ferrati and Pascoletti. The competition was won by the Gruppo Toscano (Tuscan Group), of which Giovanni Michelucci and Italo Gamberini were the most notable members.

The same year, the contract for the construction of the heating plant and main controls cabin was awarded on 4 July to the Bianchi Gabriello & Figli building firm, to be completed two years later, on 15 June, just before the new railway station.

The contract for the iron works, the four boilerplates with vertical water tubes and three drums, their "Prat" type chimneys, the catwalk above them and the helix stairs was awarded to Anonima Pignone in February 1934.

== Design ==
The complex of the heating plant and the main controls cabin is placed along via della Ghiacciaia, at the corner with via della Cittadella. On the other side it overlooks directly the rails, placed a floor up to the roadway.

The complex presents. two main blocks:

- The heating plant: at the ground floor on via della Ghiacciaia, with two technical rooms, one for the ashes and one for the steam accumulators. On the first floor (at rails level), the boilers room and on the second floor the room with the hoppers to feed the boilers.
- The main controls cabin: with a semicircular head on via della Ghiacciaia, with porthole windows on the inner side and the third floor the deck with a full-length windows, as a control tower for the rails.

These two main buildings are joined and completed with three other blocks:

- The two floors building at the corner with via della Citadella. On ground floor the offices and the technical rooms with the pumps; offices also on the first floor and on the second floor two apartments.
- The building between the heating plant and the main controls cabin. On ground floor the local for the coal crushers, on the first floor (rail level) the area to dump coal and on the second floor, additional technical rooms.
- This building is completed with a semicircular "hinge", with the stairs, the elevator and a volume with cloakrooms.

The complex structure is in reinforced concrete (frame type) with different types of bricks cladding and truss. The retaining wall on rail side, with the rise of 5,20 m between the street floor and rail floor, is made on stones, tapered with a foundation 2 meters.

The formal connotation, with references and quotations borrowed from the Futurist and Constructivist experiences, relies substantially on the open and immediate declaration of the technological functions taking place inside.

== Critical reception ==
From its the completion the building aroused vivid admiration and sharp criticism for its technical aspect.

Giacomo Devoto claimed the main controls cabin and its 280 levers to manage railswitches and signals as the most perfect, most complex and complete, the most beautiful thing that exists in Italy and maybe in the World.

Filippo Tommaso Marinetti, who already praised another Mazzoni work Littoria's Post Office, enthusiastically appreciated the "avant-garde" formalism and especially admired the iron spiral stairs that becomes a catwalk to reach the chimneys, becoming an elegant promenade dangling in space; the stairs and the catwalk give agility to the whole building, remembering some flighty and elastic musics by Debussy.

Sharp criticism mocked the construction as a hideous booth painted in red.

Only from the 1970s has the project been reviewed in the general reevaluation of Mazzoni's work. The reevaluation started with Carlo Severati, who wrote some articles in charge of Bruno Zevi in 1975, and with Alfredo Forti, who wrote a biography of Mazzoni in 1978. In the same year, architect Léon Krier described the heating plant as "the greatest masterpiece of Futurist-Constructivist-Modernist architecture".

After this reevaluation, the complex has been defined as The other gem that can match, on the level of quality, against the coeval train station.
