= Angiolo Mazzoni =

Italian architect and engineer (1894–1979)

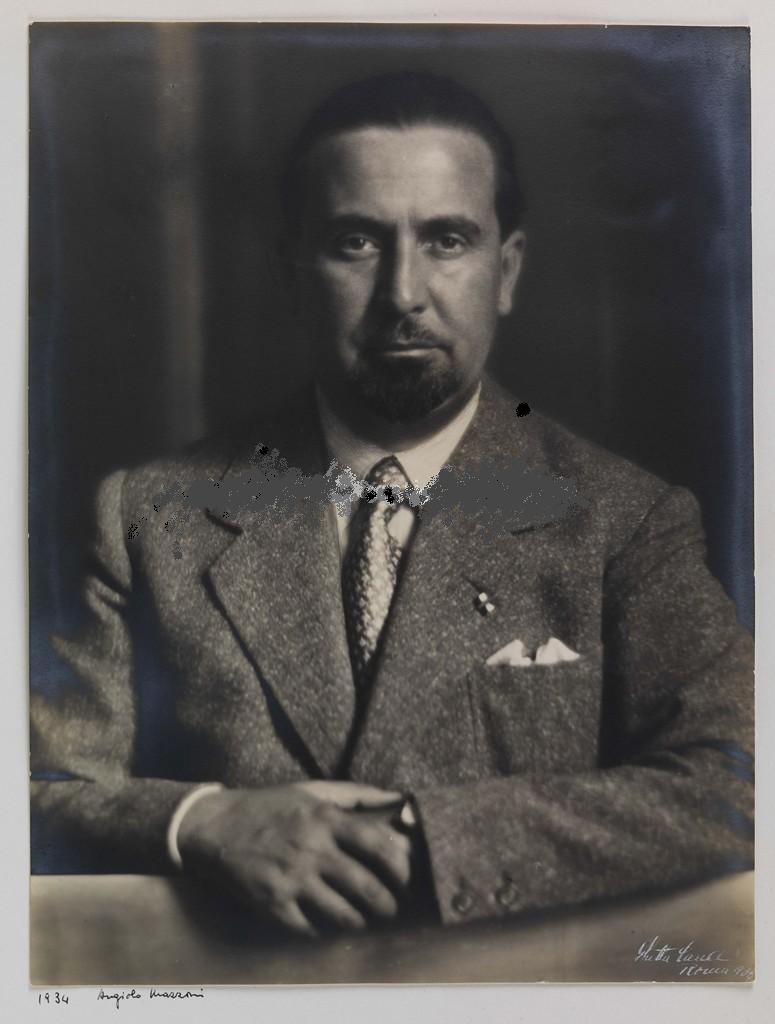
- Mazzoni in 1934
- Born: 21 May 1894; Bologna, Kingdom of Italy
- Died: 28 September 1979 (aged 85); Rome, Italy
- Education: Academy of Fine Arts, Bologna
- Occupation: Architect
- Buildings: Venezia Santa Lucia railway station, Heating plant and main controls cabin, Florence, Roma Termini railway station

Angiolo Mazzoni (21 May 1894 – 28 September 1979) was an Italian architect and engineer. He was the state architect of the Italian Fascist government of the 1920s and 1930s. Mazzoni designed hundreds of public buildings, post offices, and train stations during the Interwar period in Italy.

== Life ==
Mazzoni was born in Bologna and was moved to Rome in 1905 with his parents, but returned to the Academy of Fine Arts, Bologna, for his education. In 1920, Mazzoni practiced for about a year under Marcello Piacentini. The following year, he was engaged as an engineer with the Special Section of Railway Workers in Milan, then rose to a position in the newly formed Ministry of Communications in 1924, producing significant independent work by 1926.

Politically astute, Mazzoni also joined the National Fascist Party in 1926. He owed much of his success and influence to his intimate connections with the Fascist regime, and played a decisive role in using architecture to consolidate positive images of Fascism.

The Fascist regime engaged in a comprehensive national program of public works. As chief architect for the Ministry of Communications and for the State Railways, both key modernizing sectors of Fascist rebuilding programs, Mazzoni designed many of them. Italy still contains hundreds of its large and small railway and telecommunications buildings, extant and functioning, a tribute to its mastery of robust, hard-working construction. In many of these, he collaborated with architect and engineer Roberto Narducci.

Mazzoni's relationship with Fascism made it politically difficult for subsequent scholars to acknowledge his importance. Construction on his major commission, the vast Roma Termini railway station, was suspended in wartime Italy and redesigned by others after the Fascist defeat. Other important buildings by Mazzoni were crudely altered or demolished in the post-war period. His own personal advocacy of Fascism worked against his legacy, even after the end of World War II, when he voluntarily exiled himself in Bogotá, Colombia, until 1963.

More recently, academics and scholars such as Ezio Godoli, Giorgio Muratore, and Enrico Crispolti have begun a rehabilitation process and a critical re-evaluation of Mazzoni. His archive is now kept at the Museum of Modern Art in Trento, and efforts are being made to ensure the conservation of his most important surviving buildings.

== Works ==
Mazzoni's early works show connections to the Viennese School of Josef Hoffmann and Otto Wagner, with a neo-classical influence.
Stylistically eclectic, Mazzoni joined in 1933 to the so-called "second phase" of the Italian artistic movement Futurism, signing in 1934 the Manifesto of Aerial Architecture with F.T. Marinetti and the journalist Mino Somenzi, the architectural evolution of the futurist aeropittura. Throughout his work, his stylistic approach varied dramatically, from the overtly bombastic and classical to the dynamically modern. Mazzoni's works include:

- Venezia Santa Lucia railway station (designed 1924, built 1934–1943, completed postwar)
- Palazzo delle Poste, Palermo, with murals by Benedetta Cappa (1926–1934)
- Reconstruction of the Bolzano/Bozen railway station, with architectural sculpture by Italian sculptor Franz Ehrenhöfer (1927–1929)
- Palazzo delle Poste, Grosseto, with architectural sculpture by Italian sculptor Napoleone Martinuzzi (1930)
- the colonia "Rosa Maltoni Mussolini", Pisa (1926–1931)
- the railway station of Latina (1932)
- "Palace of Post and Telegraphs", Latina (1932)
- central post office, Gorizia (1932)
- Ricevitore Postetelegrafonica, Sabaudia (1933)
- The Siena railway station (1933–35)
- The railway station of Montecatini Terme (1933–37)
- The boiler house, control cabin, and personnel facilities at Firenze Santa Maria Novella railway station (1934)
- The Reggio Emilia railway station (c. 1935)
- Roma Tiburtina railway station (1937)
- The central railway station of Reggio Calabria (1938)
- The central railway station of Messina (1939)
- Roma Termini railway station (c. 1940, unfinished and work abandoned c. 1943)

== Trento's Railway Station ==
One classic example of Mazzoni's work is the railway station in Trento, a city in the north-eastern Italian Alps, built during 1934–36. Trento had a special significance for the Fascist regime as the capital of the Trentino-Alto Adige (Welschtirol-Südtirol) region, annexed to Italy from Austria at the Treaty of Versailles after World War I.

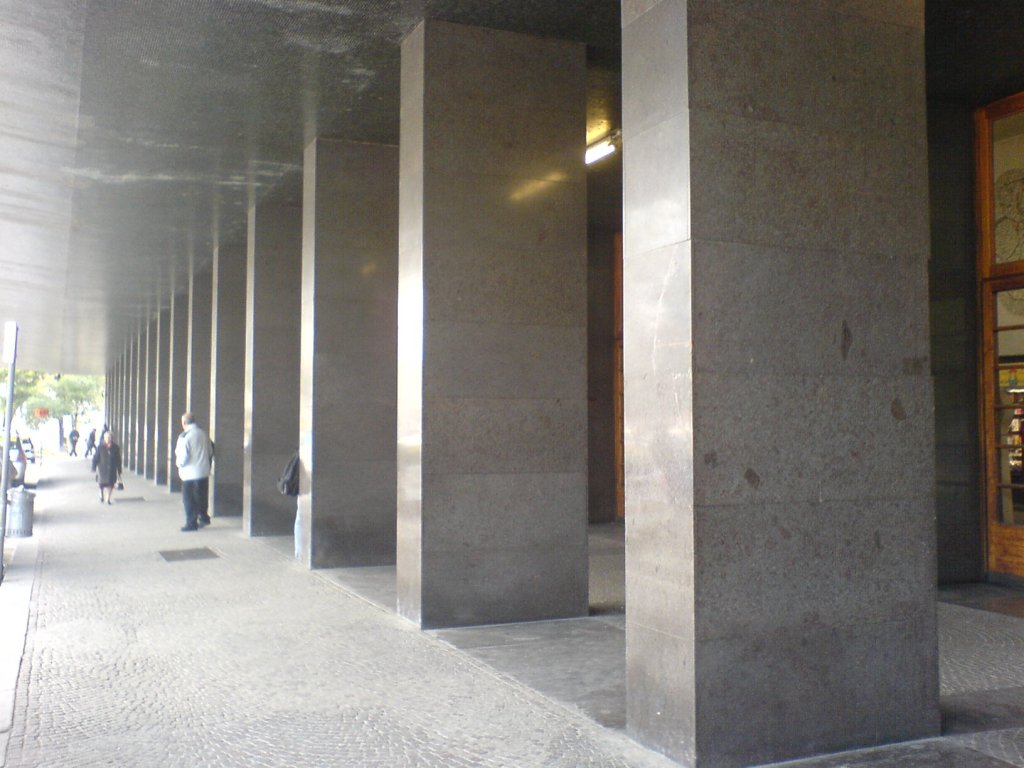
Trento station, front colonnade

Trento's railway station represents Mazzoni's interpretation of the functionalist style typical of the times; the building's continuous windows and dynamic structural lines are said to express Futurist ideas of speed and streamlining. The station stands out due to its innovative use of steel, glass, and several varieties of local stone.

The station offers platforms on four rail tracks, and its design is intended to facilitate the flow of people from the street to the trains. Wide wood-frame doors open on the entire facade. A wide, shallow staircase leads to the underpassage to the 2nd and 3rd tracks. Spacious waiting space is provided under cover or indoors.

In addition to ticket offices, a tobacconist, a news-stand, and baggage store, the station also provided office space for administration, restrooms, a restaurant and bar (today only a bar remains), and conference rooms and meeting space. Mazzoni was more than an architect. He was also an important interior and furniture designer, and all the components of his buildings, from wall decorations to brass door-handles and glazed screens, were designed by his office. The main hall of Trento railway station was decorated with large mosaics depicting the life of the people and the natural beauties of the mountainous region around Trento. These depictions were typical of the time and served an educational-propagandistic purpose. Originally, the ceiling is said to have been painted light green.
