= Anthony J. Lumsden =

American architect (1928–2011)

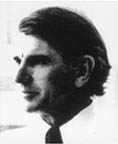
- Born: Anthony John Hale Lumsden; May 16, 1928; Bournemouth, England
- Died: September 22, 2011 (aged 83); Los Angeles, California, U.S.
- Education: University of Sydney
- Occupation: Architect
- Spouse: Anne Lumsden
- Children: 3
- Practice: AJLA
- Website: ajlumsden.com

Anthony John Hale Lumsden (May 16, 1928 – September 22, 2011) was an American architect most noted for his sculptural and often "futuristic" designs. His projects in Southern California such as the Tillman Water Reclamation Plant are often seen in Hollywood films and television shows such as Star Trek Next Generation as part of Starfleet Academy.

== Biography ==
=== Early life ===
Lumsden was born on May 16, 1928, in Bournemouth, England. He was raised in Sydney, Australia, where he went to the University of Sydney architecture school. After graduation, he spent a year traveling throughout Europe on a motorcycle from Scandinavia to the Mediterranean, finally settling in London. After a few years there, he was encouraged by a colleague to travel to the United States.

=== Career ===
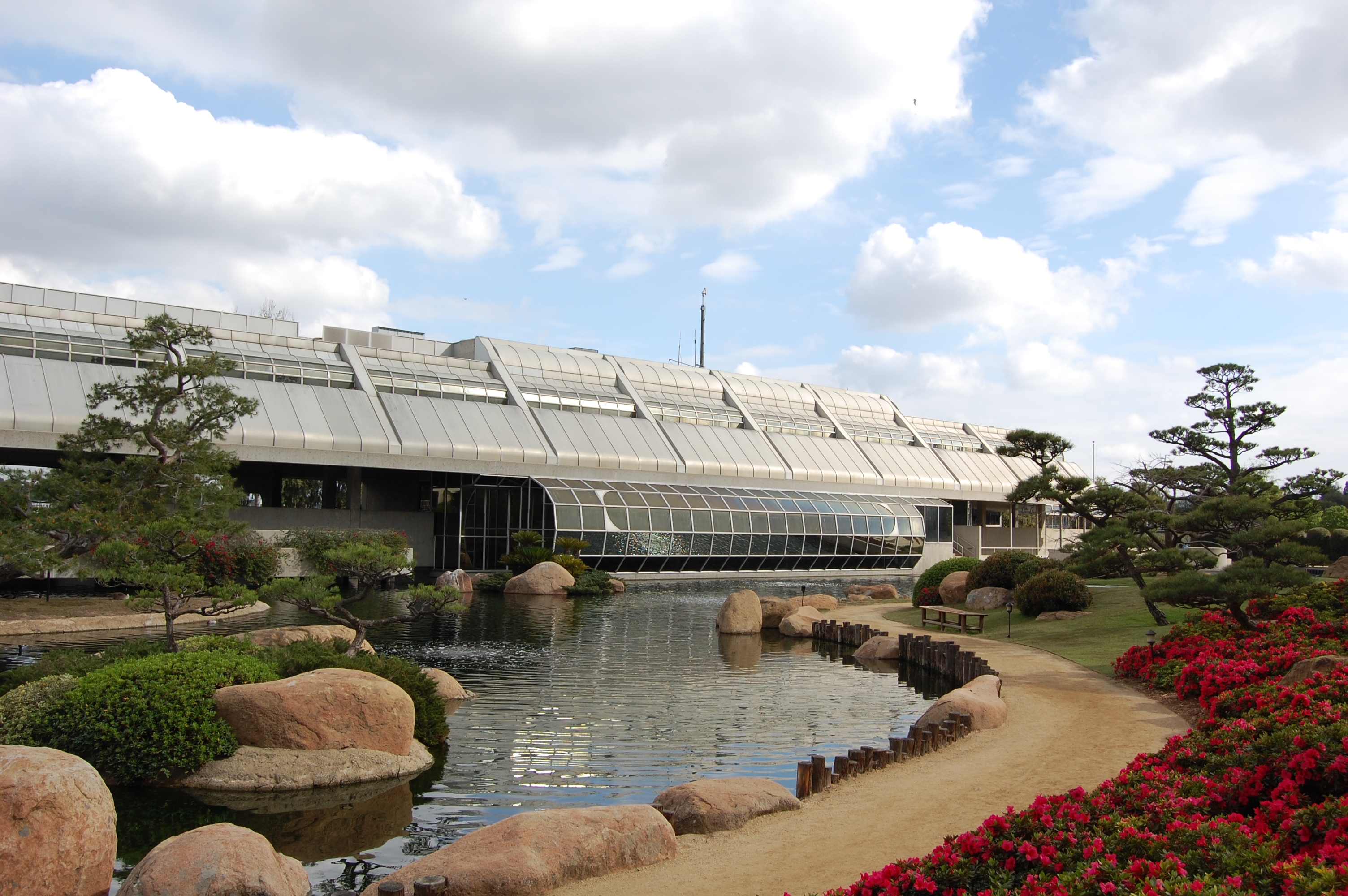
Tillman Water Reclamation plant

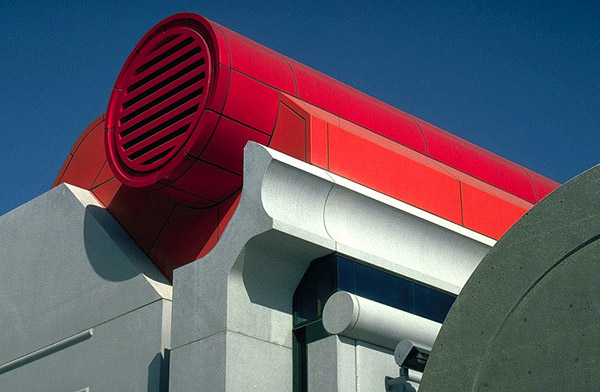
Hyperion sewage treatment plant

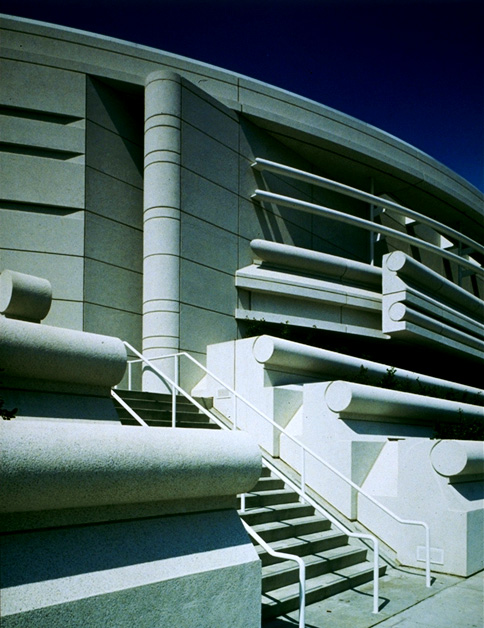
Moscone Center

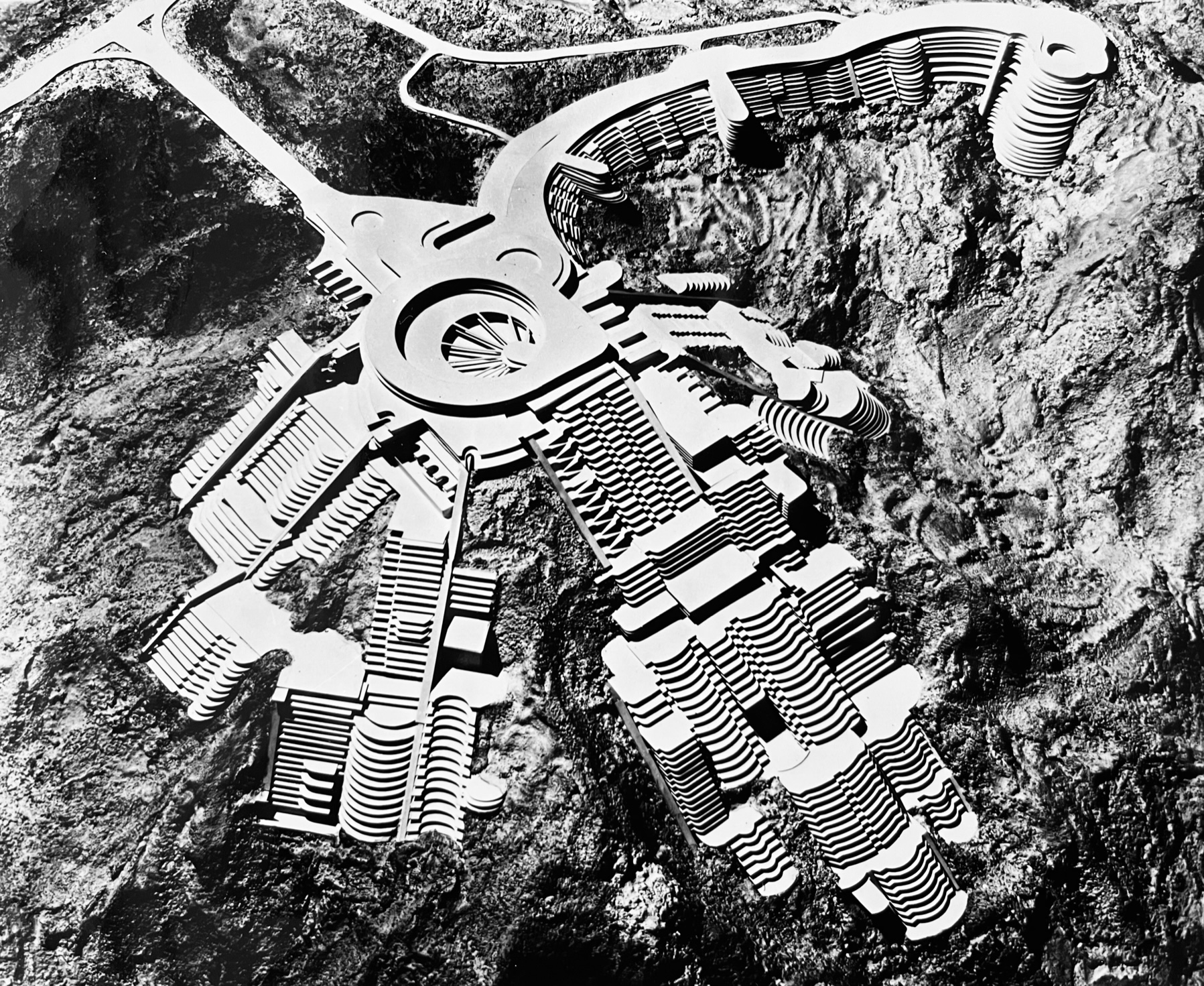
Sunset Mountain Park

His first job at Eero Saarinen & Associates in Bloomfield Hills, Michigan, was running the blue print machine. He soon got an opportunity to work on a new chapel design for Concordia Senior College and Eero noticed his talent. He quickly became a core member of the design team at the office and met numerous famous designers and artists of the time such as Charles and Ray Eames, Mies van der Rohe and Alexander Calder. After Saarinen's death, he continued to work with Kevin Roche and John Dinkeloo at Roche-Dinkeloo in Hamden, Connecticut. During this period of time he worked on several National AIA award-winning projects such as the General Motors Technical Center.

In 1965, the Los Angeles-based large, multi-service architectural and engineering firm Daniel, Mann, Johnson & Mendenhall (DMJM) offered Cesar Pelli, who had also worked at Saarinen, a position as their director of design. Shortly thereafter, Pelli persuaded Lumsden to join him as Assistant Director of Design. On his reasons for selecting Lumsden, Pelli stated, "It was very important to have somebody to hear you. Tony would be ideal…he was very bright, very thoughtful, he thinks originally. That was most important for me. Also he was a very good designer and a fantastic draftsman."

DMJM had hired Pelli and Lumsden to break with orthodox Modernism, but keeping in mind stringent time and money constraints, and working for many clients who were ambivalent about architectural design. Pelli and Lumsden still delivered. One of their first collaborations, Sunset Mountain Park (1966), was a hyper-tech megastructure proposed for the Santa Monica Mountains with an urban nucleus and housing for 7,200 that somehow still acknowledged City of Los Angeles open space ordinances. The project won the Progressive Architecture First Design Award in 1966.

"We used to discuss architecture endlessly. Our primary moment was during lunch. We would go somewhere and just discuss architecture – how to do things, what the possibilities were within a firm like DMJM, etc. That was part of it. Unquestionably many of the forms and ideas we developed came out of those discussions." Perhaps their most enduring design legacy of this time, Pelli and Lumsden first formulated the reversed mullion glass skin. The Century City Medical Plaza (1969), a straightforward 19-story black box, was the first building to incorporate the new design system. Pelli took the initial lead in designing the Medical Plaza, which was done while Lumsden was assigned to rapid transit work at a separate office within DMJM. However, the design concept is theirs together. Its vertical and horizontal mullions only protrude 3/8 of an inch and are applied continuously with solar performance glass across the entire building.

The reversed mullion was an idea that Lumsden had initially wanted to apply to Saarinen's Holmdel, New Jersey Bell Labs project (1962), on which he was design manager, but the idea was rejected at the time. Lumsden called the new design system, "non-directional, non-gravitational," and it undid the tripartite stacking seen on towers since the time of Louis Sullivan. Their mirrored skin FAA building (1973) in Hawthorne, CA was atmospheric, anti-monumental, and like aerospace and electronic objects, was encased. The FAA building was also the first designed with a mirrored glass skin, though not the first completed. Admittedly informed by design approaches and technical innovations developed at the Saarinen—later Roche-Dinkeloo—office, Pelli and Lumsden's reversed mullion glass skin was pragmatic but distinct, and the oft-copied design system would become a global corporate vernacular through the 1970s and into the mid-1980s.

In 1968 Pelli left DMJM and Lumsden became Director of Design, and stayed in the position for over 25 years. Between 1969 and 1971 Lumsden designed three Wilshire Boulevard Solarbronze-clad towers (One Park Plaza, Century Bank Building, Manufacturer's Bank Building) earning him international acclaim by applying the glass skin and form "mutations" to break apart the box. Lumsden followed this with horizontally extruded buildings based on distinct functional sections, repeated and therefore standardized and cost efficient. Many remained unbuilt, including the Beverly Hills Hotel (1973), whose renderings depict full-length cylinders articulating various interior functions rolling out of an extended horizontal tower, everything within a silver mirrored skin. Many of these influential designs were published internationally.

He was selected as a member of the Silver Group and the LA12 (twelve distinguished architects including John Lautner, Craig Elwood, Frank Gehry, Cesar Pelli and Ray Kappe, organized by California State University, Pomona in 1976).

In 1979, he was invited by Philip Johnson and Arthur Drexler as one of six internationally recognized architects including Michael Graves, Robert A. M. Stern and James Wines, to create a facade design for The Museum of Modern Art's "Buildings for Best Products" exhibition. Utilizing the latest glass technology to sculptural ends, Lumsden's design was lauded in Drexler's press release as "perhaps the most astonishing of the six." Lumsden wrote: "The Best showroom project continues to investigate an architectural vocabulary I have used for several years: the membrane aesthetic; the extruded facade; intersecting forms; and reversed curves. In this project destruction of the box is intended without identifying with inversion and entropy as generative resources."

Although he worked on hundreds of well-known large-scale projects including the Moscone Center, Ontario International Airport, and the San Francisco Marriott (famous for its Flash Gordon-like postmodern jukebox shaped tower), his most famous built work is the Tillman Water Reclamation Plant.

=== Death ===
Lumsden died of pancreatic cancer in Los Angeles, California, at the age of 83. He was survived by his wife and three children.

== Awards and reputation ==
In 2003 Lumsden received the American Institute of Architects gold medal for life achievement in design. The Tillman water reclamation plant administration building received the 25th anniversary AIA award in 2019. Lumsden won more than 30 architectural design awards from institutions such as the American Institute of Architects, U.S. Department of Housing and Urban Development, Progressive Architecture, National Society of Professional Engineers, Consulting Engineers Association, Institute of Human Engineering Sciences, and American Institute of Steel Construction. In recognition of the design excellence of his projects and for "the innovation of his design approach," Lumsden was named to the College of Fellows of the American Institute of Architects in the first year of his eligibility.

Leon Whiteson, Architecture Critic for the Los Angeles Times said of Lumsden: "In the practice of architecture, it is rare to find a man who is both highly successful and widely respected by his peers. Anthony Lumsden is that rare man. By the general consent of colleagues and critics ranging from intensely opinionated minds like Britain's Charles Jencks, Reyner Banham and Esther McCoy, to practicing peers like Lou Naidorf, director of design for Welton Becket Associates, Lumsden is one of the best mainstream modernists in America, or anywhere."

Critic and Architectural Historian Professor Kenneth Frampton of Columbia University wrote in SD in 1999: "Lumsden remains a man apart on the American scene today, unsung by the critical establishment but regarded with great respect by those who have a longer aim in view."

Leon Whiteson, architectural critic, wrote in an article for the Los Angeles Times, "The Los Angeles architect with the longest track record and most respected reputation in the design of public projects is Anthony Lumsden".
