= Girl Running on a Balcony =

1912 painting by Giacomo Balla

- Artist: Giacomo Balla
- Year: 1912
- Medium: oil on canvas
- Dimensions: 125 cm × 125 cm (49 in × 49 in)
- Location: Museo del Novecento, Milan

Girl Running on a Balcony is a 1912 painting by Giacomo Balla, one of the forerunners of the Italian movement called Futurism. The piece indicates the artist's growing interests in creative nuances which would later formally be realized as part of the Futurist movement. The artist was heavily influenced by northern Italians' use of Divisionism and the French's better-known pointillism. Created with oil on canvas just on the brink of World War I, the Futurist movement is embodied by a dark optimism for a future of speed, turbulence, chaos, and new beginnings. Most of Giacaomo Balla's pieces allude to the wonder of dynamic movement, and this painting is no exception. The oil painting is now in the Museo del Novecento, in Milan.

== Futurist theory ==
The early Futurist movement began with Filippo Marinetti’s “Futurist Manifesto” in 1909 and is followed up by Umberto Boccioni’s 1910 manifesto, “The City Rises.” The manifestos represent the Futurists’ statement of artistic purpose and defined the creative work of its founders and later followers. Balla, among other artists, signed his name at the bottom of the latter manifesto and would later go on to publish his own renditions of the Futurist mission. The Futurists lived in a time of fierce social and political change. The industrial world was unfolding as technology continued to advance. They were quite avant-garde and used materials indicative of a modern age, as exemplified in Boccioni's bronze Unique Forms of Continuity in Space. The Italian dictionary defines futurism as “wanting to make a clean slate of the past and traditional forms of expression to make way for the inquisition of dynamic modern life, a mechanical civilization projecting into the future in a riot of senses….” The Futurists were concerned with literal and figurative movement on both individual and larger, national scales. Physical movement often is used in Futurist art to represent machinery, which in turn represents technology and ultimately our progress and movement as a civilization into the future. The Futurists were an extreme bunch; not one of them was over the age of thirty and they considered war the world's own hygiene. They opposed ideas of morality and feminism, and they saw great promise in speed. Their world was hurtling into the future, and there was time only to depict only the truly beautiful. In 1909, they wrote, “Beauty exists only in struggle. There is no masterpiece that has not an aggressive character. Poetry must be a violent assault on the forces of the unknown, to force them to bow before man.” The Futuristic style borrows from other forward thinking movements: Post-Impressionism, Symbolism, Divisionism, Cubism, and Pointillism.

== Painting analysis ==
Young Girl Running on Balcony mainly addresses dynamism, the phenomenon Futurists devoted their lives to illustrating. Merriam-Webster defines it as the “theory that all phenomena (as matter or motion) can be explained as manifestations of force." The Futurists believed that everything is made of dynamic forces, and that everything is in constant motion. This idea is best noted in the girl's repeated form across the canvas, which works to represent her actual movement through space. The lines are not very definitive between each form; in fact, there aren't many lines at all. The piece emulates an unusual sort of micro-cubist style. Balla also calls upon the techniques of both French Pointillism and Italian Divisionism. Pointillist painters utilize tiny points, which they dot on the canvas to create an image. Georges Seurat demonstrated the technique most famously in his piece, A Sunday Afternoon on the Island of La Grande Jatte. Conversely, the Divisionists, based in the north of Italy, used long brush strokes, more rectangular in shape than the Pointillists’ dots, and painted them next to strokes of contrasting color to create texture and depth in an image. Giovanni Segantini was famous for his pastoral representations of life in the Alps; his 1893 Afternoon in the Alps exemplifies his mastery of the Divisionist style. Balla emulates both these artists in Young Girl Running on Balcony by using tiny squares to create a mosaic effect. The many squares further break down the image of the girl herself and force the viewer to focus not on her form, but on her fragmented motion through time and space. Her movement, blurred lines between each step, is not exactly disjointed nor is it really fluid, but it is definitely continuous.

=== Color palette ===
The painting's color palette is also typical of the Futurist palette. Balla chose ultra bright colors, a hallmark of the style which Boccioni explains in "Futurist Painting: Technical Manifesto":

Your eyes, accustomed to semi-darkness, will soon open to more radiant visions of light. The shadows which we shall paint shall be more luminous than the highlights of our predecessors, and our pictures, next to those of the museums, will shine like blinding daylight compared with deepest night.

Not only do the pigments nearly shine, they do not mix with each other. This continues to abstract the painting and lets the viewer focus on the movement and organized chaos of the piece rather than focusing on unnecessary details you might find in another piece, like the girl's facial features or hair color. That is not to say that the artist does not include detail; he simply does not take advantage of it and does not directly draw the viewer's attention to little things, like the girl's swishing braid. The painting has no central point on which the eye focuses; instead the eye travels across the canvas. The running scene appears to continue beyond the frame's surface, attesting to the girl's dynamic energy and momentum in the piece.

== See also ==
- List of works by Giacomo Balla
