= Street light (disambiguation) =

A street light is a raised source of light used to illuminate streets and their surrounding area.

Streetlight or Streetlights may also refer to:

- Street Light (painting), a 1909 painting by futurist Giacomo Balla
- "Streetlight", a song by The Getaway Plan
- "Street Light", a song by Die Antwoord from their album Mount Ninji and da Nice Time Kid
- Streetlights (Bonnie Raitt album), a 1974 album, or its title track
- Streetlights (Kurupt album), a 2010 album, or its title track
- Street Lights (film), a 2018 Indian film
- "Street Lights" (song), a song by Kanye West from his album 808s & Heartbreak

== See also ==
- Street light interference phenomenon, a paranormal phenomenon
- Streetlight effect, a type of observational bias
