= Mercury Passing Before the Sun =

Series of paintings by Giacomo Balla

- Mercurio transita davanti al sole (Italian)
- Version in the Peggy Guggenheim Collection
- Artist: Giacomo Balla
- Year: 1914
- Type: oil painting
- Medium: Tempera on paper lined with canvas
- Subject: Transit of the planet Mercury across the face of the Sun, November 17, 1914
- Dimensions: 120 cm × 100 cm (47 in × 39 in)
- Location: Peggy Guggenheim Collection (on long-term loan), Venice

Mercury Passing Before the Sun (Italian: Mercurio transita davanti al sole or Mercurio (che) passa davanti al sole) is the title of a series of paintings by Italian Futurist painter Giacomo Balla, depicting the November 17, 1914, transit of Mercury across the face of the Sun.

Balla, an amateur astronomer, observed the transit through a telescope likely outfitted with a smoked glass filter. His composition, according to daughter Elica Balla, depicts two intersecting views of the event, through the telescope and with the naked eye. Green and white triangles in the painting represent glare and other optical effects observed by Balla. In several versions of the painting, overlapping spirals, suggestive of the telescope body, emanate from the golden-orange orb of the magnified and filtered Sun; these encounter the brilliant white star in the upper left—the Sun as seen with the naked eye.

The painting represents Balla's subjective experience of the event. It exemplifies his transition to a more abstract style, as well as his interest in themes of cosmogony; he uses the opacity of gouache to suggest a dense fusion of cosmic forces. During this period, Balla had begun to experiment with the use of geometric and curving forms and transparent planes to convey movement. Mercury Passing Before the Sun translates the temporal progression of Mercury's transition into a spatial progression, using methods devised by the Cubists.

== Versions ==
Balla created at least a dozen versions and studies of the painting; the 120 cm × 100 cm (47 in × 39 in) version in tempera, now in the Peggy Guggenheim Collection in Venice, is considered by that gallery to be the "definitive outcome" of these studies. Other versions include:

- A 138 cm × 99 cm (54 in × 39 in) version in tempera on canvas, located at the mumok in Vienna
- A 61 cm × 50.5 cm (24.0 in × 19.9 in) version in oil on canvas, located at the Musée National d'Art Moderne, in Paris
- A 64.8 cm × 50.5 cm (25.5 in × 19.9 in) version in watercolor and graphite on woven paper adhered to canvas, in the Philadelphia Museum of Art
- An 81 cm × 61 cm (32 in × 24 in) study in gouache on paper, sold at auction in 2015 for US$1.69 million to the A. Alfred Taubman Collection (This study, most closely related to the version at the mumok in Vienna, had previously been exhibited in the Vancouver Art Gallery, the Scottish National Gallery of Modern Art in Edinburgh, the Galleria Sprovieri in Rome, the Philippe Daverio Gallery in New York City, and the Galeries nationales du Grand Palais in Paris.)
- A 42.1 cm × 30 cm (16.6 in × 11.8 in) study in pencil and gouache, at the Museum of Modern Art in New York City (not on public view as of 2016)
- A 65.4 cm × 50.5 cm (25.7 in × 19.9 in) version in tempera and oil on woven paper adhered to canvas, in the Yale University Art Gallery collection, New Haven, Connecticut (not on public view as of 2026)
- A 24.5 cm × 18.3 cm (9.6 in × 7.2 in) version in pastel on primed paper, which was displayed in 2015 at the Kröller-Müller Museum, Otterlo, Netherlands, on loan from the private Triton Collection Foundation. This version was later listed for sale at auction in 2018.
- A version in the Palazzo Maffei, Verona
- A 22.9 cm × 17.2 cm (9.0 in × 6.8 in) version in tempera on paper on cardboard, sold at auction in 2020 in Florida, United States of America

== See also ==
- List of works by Giacomo Balla
- 1914 in art
