= List of works by Giacomo Balla =

The following is a list of works by Futurist artist Giacomo Balla.

| Image | English title | Italian title | Year | Media | Location |
|---|---|---|---|---|---|
| | Woman Sewing | | 1887 | oil on canvas | private collection |
| | Self Portrait | Autosmorfia | 1894 | oil on cardboard | private collection |
| | Self Portrait | | 1894 | oil on cardboard | private collection |
| | Landscape | | 1900 | oil on canvas | |
| | Luna Park, Paris | Luna Park, Parigi | 1900 | painting | private collection |
| | Bankruptcy | Fallimento | 1902 | | |
| | Outdoor Portrait | | 1902 | oil on canvas | Galleria Nazionale d'Arte Moderna, Rome, Italy |
| | A Worker's Day | | 1904 | oil on cardboard | private collection |
| | The Madwoman | | 1905 | oil on canvas | |
| | Portrait of a Lady | | 1907 | oil on canvas | private collection |
| | The Doubt | Il Dubbio | 1907–1908 | | Galleria Nazionale d'Arte Moderna, Rome, Italy |
| | Street Light | Lampada ad arco | 1910–11 | oil on canvas | Museum of Modern Art, New York City |
| | Dynamism of a Dog on a Leash | Dinamismo di un cane al guinzaglio | 1912 | | Albright–Knox Art Gallery, Buffalo, New York |
| | Girl Running on a Balcony | | 1912 | oil on canvas | Galleria d'Arte Moderna, Milan, Italy |
| | The Hand of the Violinist | | 1912 | oil on canvas | Estorick Collection of Modern Italian Art, London |
| | Speeding Automobile | | 1912 | oil on wood | Museum of Modern Art, New York City |
| | Iridescent Interpenetration (series) | Compenetrazione iridiscente | 1912–1914 | multiple | multiple |
| | Speeding Car (study for Abstract Speed) | Auto in corsa | 1913 | gouache and watercolor on paper | |
| | Abstract Speed | Velocità + paesaggio | 1913 | | |
| | Abstract Speed – The Car Has Passed | Velocità astratta - l'auto è passata | 1913 | oil on canvas | Tate Modern, London, UK |
| | Automobile in Corsa | | 1913 | oil on board | private collection |
| | Flight of the Swallows / Lines of Movement and Dynamic Succession | | 1913 | tempera on paper | private collection |
| | Landscape | Paesaggio | 1913 | | |
| | Landscape 1913 | | 1913 | oil on canvas | private collection |
| | Line of Speed | | 1913 | oil on canvas | private collection |
| | Lines of Speed / Synthesis of Movement | | 1913 | painting | private collection |
| | Rhythm + Noise + Speed of Car | Ritmo + rumore + velocità d'automobile | 1913 | | |
| | Shape and Noise of Motorcyclist | | 1913 | tempera on paper | Kröller Möller Museum, Apeldoorn, The Netherlands |
| | The Speed of a Car + Light / The Speed of an Automobile | | 1913 | | private collection |
| | Velocity of Cars and Light | | 1913 | oil on canvas | Moderna Museet, Stockholm, Sweden |
| | The Speed of the Motorcycle | Velocità di motocicletta | 1913 | chalk drawing | private collection |
| | Swifts: Path of Movement and Dynamic Sequences | | 1913 | oil on canvas | Museum of Modern Art, New York City |
| | Linear Synthesis of Velocity | | 1913 | drawing | private collection |
| | Abstract Speed + Sound | Velocità astratta + rumore | 1913–14 | oil on canvas | Peggy Guggenheim Collection, Venice, Italy |
| | Complex Color at the Speed of Sound | | 1914 | oil on panel | private collection |
| | Mercury Passing Before the Sun (series) | Mercurio passa davanti al sole | 1914 | multiple | Peggy Guggenheim Collection, Venice, Italy Other versions reside at: mumok, Vienna, Austria; Musée National d'Art Moderne, Paris, France; Philadelphia Museum of Art, Philadelphia, US; Museum of Modern Art, New York City; private collection |
| | | Rumoristica Plastica Baltrr | 1914 | mixed media | private collection |
| | Vortex, Space, Form | Vortice, spazio, forme | 1914 | oil on canvas | private collection |
| | Dynamic of Boccioni's fist | | 1914 | sculpture | |
| | Sculptural Construction of Noise and Speed / Plastic Ensemble | | 1914–15 | assemblage | Hirshhorn Museum and Sculpture Garden, Washington, D.C. |
| | Lines – Force of Boccioni's Fist | | 1915 | | |
| | Crowd + Landscape | | 1915 | collage | private collection |
| | Flags at the Altar of the Motherland | | 1915 | | |
| | Flags for the Altar | | 1915 | | |
| | Design Sketches: 'Mimicry Synoptic' or 'Spring' | Bozzetto scenografico: 'Mimica sinottica' o 'Primavera' | 1915 | | |
| | Mimicry Synoptic: Costume Design for the Valle | | 1915 | | |
| | Mimicry Synoptic: The Sky Woman | | 1915 | | |
| | Mimicry Synoptic: The Tree Woman or Woman Flower | | 1915 | | |
| | September 20 demonstration | | 1915 | | |
| | Sketch For The Ballet By Igor Stravinsky: Fireworks | Feu d'Artifice | 1915 | oil on canvas | |
| | Futurist Force Field | | 1916 | | |
| | Streamlines Futur | | 1916 | oil on canvas | private collection |
| | Warship, Widow and Wind (Veil of Vedova and Landscape) | | 1916 | oil on panel | private collection |
| | | Linea di Compenetrazione | 1916 | | |
| | Dynamic of Boccioni's Fist—Lines of Force II | | 1916–17 | sculpture | Hirshhorn Museum and Sculpture Garden, Washington, D.C. |
| | Mutilated Trees | Alberi Mutilati | 1918 | | |
| | Design for Living Room Furnishings | | 1918 | | |
| | Future (study) | | 1918 | oil on canvas | |
| | Plastic Colour | | 1918 | | |
| | Poster For "Casa D'Arte Bragaglia" | | 1918 | | |
| | Spirit-Form Transformation | Transformación forma-espíritu | 1918 | | |
| | Spring | Primavera | 1918 | | |
| | Flowers and Lines Performing | | 1918–19 | gouache painting | private collection |
| | | Futurlibecciata | 1919 | oil on canvas | private collection |
| | Landscape + Swallows in Flight | | 1919 | oil on canvas | private collection |
| | Marina | | 1919 | oil on board | private collection |
| | Marombra | | 1919 | oil on canvas | |
| | Numbers in Love | | 1920 | oil on canvas | |
| | Science against Obscurantism | Scienza contra obscurantismo | 1920 | oil on canvas | private collection |
| | The Spell is Broken | | 1920 | oil on canvas | private collection |
| | | Dinamismo Andamentale | 1923 | oil on canvas | private collection |
| | Future | | 1923 | oil on canvas | private collection |
| | Pessimism and Optimism | Pessimismo e optimismo | 1923 | oil on canvas | private collection |
| | Nuns and Landscape | | 1925 | | |
| | Spatial Forces | | 1925 | oil on canvas | private collection |
| | | Linee andamentali | 1926–27 | oil on canvas | private collection |
| | | Andiamo che è tardi | 1934 | | private collection |
| | We four in the mirror | | 1945 | | |

== See also ==
- Category:Giacomo Balla on Wikimedia Commons
