= Futurist Painting: Technical Manifesto =

Manifesto by Umberto Boccioni

The Futurist Painting: Technical Manifesto (1910) by Umberto Boccioni (1882-1916) was the first exposition of the theoretical underpinnings of Italian Futurist painting.

== Publication ==
The manifesto was first published as a leaflet in Poesia, in Milan, 11 April 1910. Apart from Boccioni, it was signed by Carlo Carrà, Luigi Russolo, Giacomo Balla and Gino Severini, although they did not necessarily all contribute to the text. The translation most often used in English is from the Exhibition of Works by the Italian Futurist Painters at the Sackville Gallery in London, March 1912.

== Antecedents ==
The manifesto built on the publication of the Manifesto of Futurism by Filippo Marinetti in Le Figaro in Paris in 1909 and Boccioni's Manifesto of the Futurist Painters published as a leaflet in Poesia, 11 February 1910, neither of which had described in detail how Futurist ideas would be represented on the canvas.
