= Iridescent Interpenetration =

Series of artworks by Giacomo Balla

- Italian: Compenetrazione iridiscente
- Artist: Giacomo Balla
- Year: 1912–1914

Iridescent Interpenetration (Italian: Compenetrazione iridiscente) is the title of several artworks and studies in a series by Italian Futurist painter Giacomo Balla, created between 1912 and 1914, which feature intersecting triangles and other geometric patterns in kaleidoscopic color.

In Iridescent Interpenetration, Balla attempts to separate the experience of light from the perception of objects as such, in an approach he had experimented with in Welcome to Düsseldorf. The works suggest an extension of the pictured surface beyond the borders of the frame.

The earliest known study in the series was on a postcard which Balla mailed to his friend and student Gino Galli on November 21, 1912. He referred to the images as iride ('spectrum' or 'rainbow').

Works in the series include:

Title	Year	Dimensions	Material	Gallery	References
Iridescent Interpenetration No. 1	1912	99 cm × 59 cm (39 in × 23 1/4 in)	oil and wax crayon on canvas	Lydia Winston Malbin Collection	
Compenetrazione iridiscente n. 4 – studio della luce (Iridescent Interpenetration No. 4 – Study of light)	1912 or 1913	49.5 cm × 42 cm (19 1/2 in × 16 9/16 in)	oil and pencil on paper	Galleria Civica d'Arte Moderna e Contemporanea, Turin, Italy	
Iridescent Interpenetration No.5 – Eucalyptus	1914	101 cm × 120 cm (39 5/8 in × 47 1/4 in)	oil on canvas		
Iridescent Interpenetration No. 7	1912	83.0 cm × 83.0 cm (32 11/16 in × 32 11/16 in)	oil on canvas	Galleria Civica d'Arte Moderna e Contemporanea, Turin, Italy	
Iridescent Interpenetration	1913	25 cm × 50 cm (9 13/16 in × 19 11/16 in)			
Iridescent Compenetration	1913		watercolor on paper	private collection	
Compenetrazione iridescente n. 13 (Iridescent Interpenetration No.13)	1914				
Study for Compenetrazione iridiscente	1912	18.6 cm × 24.0 cm (7 5/16 in × 9 7/16 in)	pencil and watercolor on paper	Galleria Civica d'Arte Moderna e Contemporanea, Turin, Italy	
Study for Compenetrazione iridiscente (dai Taccuini di Düsseldorf) (Iridescent interpenetration [from the Düsseldorf notebooks])	1912	17.6 cm × 18.7 cm (6 15/16 in × 7 3/8 in)	pencil and watercolor on paper	Galleria Civica d'Arte Moderna e Contemporanea, Turin, Italy	
Study for Compenetrazione iridiscente n. 2 (Iridescent Interpenetration no. 2)	1912	22.1 cm × 17.6 cm (8 11/16 in × 6 15/16 in)	pencil and watercolor on paper	Galleria Civica d'Arte Moderna e Contemporanea, Turin, Italy	

== See also ==
- List of works by Giacomo Balla
