= Transit of minor planets =

A transit of a minor planet takes place when a minor planet passes directly between an observer and another heavenly body, obscuring a small part of that body's disc. From the perspective of observers on Earth, transits of the Sun and Moon by minor planets are very rare, as the minor planets orbiting between the Earth and those bodies are few and very small. Transits of the Sun would be more visible from the outer planets.

Transits should be distinguished from occultations, in which the minor planet entirely blocks out the light from the other body.

== Asteroids ==
Most asteroids orbit in the asteroid belt between Mars and Jupiter. For this reason, transits of the Sun by asteroids are rare from Earth's perspective, but would not be uncommon from the perspective of Jupiter. Still, the high inclination of many asteroid orbits would make this less common that it would be otherwise. One example of a forthcoming asteroid transit visible from Jupiter will be that of 4 Vesta, which will transit the Sun on January 4, 2044, with an angular diameter of 0.24″.

From the perspective of Earth, the only types of asteroids that can transit the Sun are those with orbits that take them between the two bodies. These include Aten asteroids (including Apohele asteroids and the hypothetical Vulcanoid asteroids) and some Apollo asteroids (perhaps including quasi-satellites of Earth). Unfortunately, observations of such transits are difficult because all of these asteroids are only a few kilometres in diameter at most, so that their angular diameter is too tiny to observe against the Sun.

One example was the May 16, 1990 transit of 3838 Epona with a diameter of 2.5 km. At a distance of 0.53 AU (79,000,000 km) from Earth, its angular diameter was only 0.007 seconds of arc, far too small to see. Similarly, asteroid 30825 (1990 TG_{1}) transited on April 14, 2005, but was again unobservable, having an angular diameter of about 0.05″, and 2101 Adonis transited on September 24, 2007, with an even smaller angular diameter of only 0.005″.

In theory, if a transit took place during a very close approach by a near-Earth asteroid, it might be observable. However, no such asteroid transits have been observed up to the present time.

== Comets ==
Comets may also transit the Sun; for example, Halley's Comet transited on 19 May 1910.

Another example was C/1819 N1, the Great Comet of 1819, but occurrence of that transit was not known until after it had happened, when the orbit was calculated, and although some observers later claimed to have seen the comet transiting the Sun at the time, these observations seem dubious.

== Transits of the moon ==
It is theoretically possible that minor planets on an Earth-crossing orbit could transit the Moon. However, such events would be extremely rare since only a few catalogued minor planets, such as 2004 FH, have come closer to Earth than the distance of the Moon. Such an event might be observable (an asteroid of 25 metres' diameter at a distance of 380,000 km has an angular diameter of 0.01″), but none has been observed as yet, although there have been some reports of such events, sometimes classified as UFO-sightings.

== See also ==
- Transit of Mercury
- Transit of Venus
- Great Comet of 1819
