= Capel Lofft =

British lawyer, writer and astronomer (1751–1824)

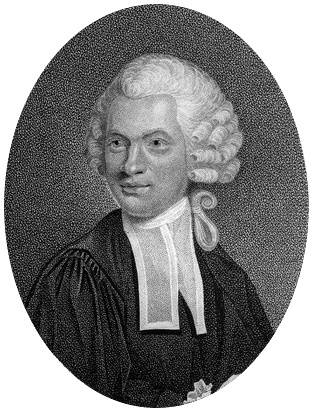
- Portrait by William Ridley, 1802
- Born: November 14, 1751 London, England
- Died: 26 May 1824 (aged 72) Moncalieri, Piedmont, Italy
- Occupation: Lawyer, poet, writer, astronomer
- Notable works: Eudosia, or a Poem on the Universe; Elements of Universal Law

Capel Lofft (sometimes spelled Capell; 14 November 1751 – 26 May 1824) was a British lawyer, writer and amateur astronomer.

== Life ==
Born in London, he was educated at Eton College and Peterhouse, Cambridge. He trained as a lawyer at Lincoln's Inn, where he was called to the bar (qualified as a barrister) in 1775. In addition to his legal practice, he became a prolific writer on the law and political topics. In politics, he was an advocate of parliamentary and other reforms, identifying with the Foxite Whig faction. He also engaged in voluminous correspondence with prominent authors.

His legal career was ended by a case in Stanton, Suffolk. On the night of 3 October 1799, Sarah Lloyd, a 22-year-old servant, was incited by a suitor to steal 40 shillings. She was caught, tried, and sentenced to death by hanging. Capel Lofft fought strenuously but unsuccessfully for a reprieve. Lloyd was to be executed on 23 April 1800 in Bury St Edmunds. Lofft accompanied the cart transporting Lloyd on that morning, holding an umbrella over Lloyd to shield her from rain, and remained by her side until she was hanged. The authorities took a dim view of Lofft's fight on Lloyd's behalf, and he was struck off the Roll (list of qualified lawyers).

Lofft wrote the preface to poet and former Quaker Thomas 'Clio' Rickman's An Ode, in Celebration of the Emancipation Of The Blacks of Saint Domingo, November 29, 1803. He commended Toussaint Louverture – "of whom Posterity will know how to speak" – and hoped that "a Nation [Haiti] which has emerged into Freedom should prove itself capable and worthy of the blessings [sic] by its use of it". He became the patron of Robert Bloomfield, the author of The Farmer's Boy, and was responsible for the publication of that work. Byron, in a note to his English Bards and Scotch Reviewers, ridiculed Lofft as "the Maecenas of shoemakers and preface-writer general to distressed versemen; a kind of gratis accoucheur to those who wish to be delivered of rhyme, but do not know how to bring forth."

Lofft had an interest in astronomy and is known to have observed several transits and eclipses. These include the transits of Mercury on 7 May 1799 and 9 November 1802, the solar eclipses on 16 June 1806 and 19 November 1816, and the lunar eclipses on 4 December 1797 and 10 June 1816.

The deaths of Lofft's father and uncle in 1811 left him with a large property and family estate. A supporter of Napoleon, he wrote letters to the editor of the Morning Chronicle (31 July and 10 August 1815) opposing the Government's decision to send Napoleon to St Helena. Lofft attempted to serve a writ of habeas corpus (a legal instrument against wrongful imprisonment) while the captive Napoleon was being held aboard a ship in Plymouth.

In 1816 Lofft moved to Europe for his daughters' education. He died in 1824 aged 72 at Montcalieri, near Turin. His 'law and miscellaneous' library was auctioned in London by R. H. Evans (along with the books of Henry Cooper Esq) on 8 June 1825. A copy of the catalogue is at Cambridge University Library (shelfmark Munby.c.129(9)).

== Family ==
Lofft married Anne, daughter of Henry Emlyn, in 1778. Their fourth son Capell Lofft the younger (1806–1873), was also a writer.

== Works ==
- 1775: The Praises of Poetry, a Poem
- 1776: Reports of Cases adjudged in the Court of King’s Bench
- 1779: Principia cum Iuris universalis tum præcipue Anglicani
- 1779: Elements of Universal Law
- 1781: Eudosia, or a Poem on the Universe
- 1785: An Essay on the Law of Libel
- 1788: Three Letters on the Question of Regency
- 1789: Observations on the first part of Dr. Knowles’s Testimonies from the Writers of the first four Centuries
- 1790: An History of the Corporation and Test Acts
- 1790: A Vindication
- 1790: Remarks on Burke’s letter upon the French revolution
- 1791: Preface to an Argument on the distinction between Manslaughter and Murther
- 1791: An Essay on the Effect of a Dissolution of Parliament on an Impeachment by the House of Commons for High Crimes and Misdemeanours
- 1792: Milton’s Paradise Lost (first book only)
- 1803: The first and second Georgic of Virgil attempted in blank verse
- 1809: On the Revival of the Cause of Reform in the Representation of the Commons in Parliament
- 1812: Aphorisms from Shakespeare
- 1814: Laura, or an Anthology of Sonnets (in five volumes)
