= Transit of Mercury =

Movement of Mercury across the Sun viewed from further away

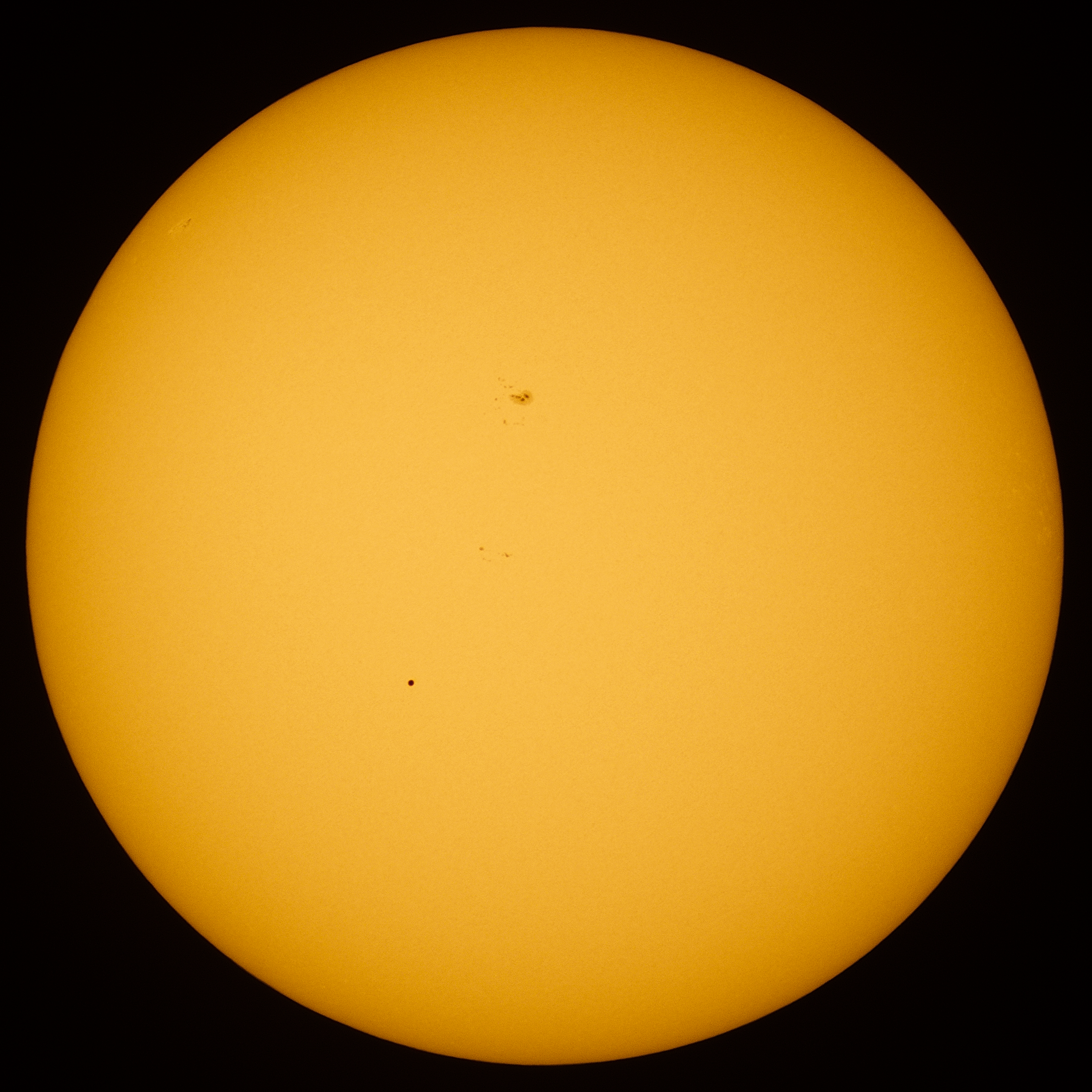
The transit of Mercury on May 9, 2016. Mercury is visible to the lower left of center. A sun spot is visible above center.

A transit of Mercury across the Sun takes place when the planet Mercury passes directly between the Sun and a superior planet. During a transit, Mercury appears as a tiny black dot moving across the Sun as the planet obscures a small portion of the solar disk. Because of orbital alignments, transits viewed from Earth occur in May or November. The last four such transits occurred on May 7, 2003; November 8, 2006; May 9, 2016; and November 11, 2019. The next will occur on November 13, 2032. Transits of Mercury typically last several hours, and they occur about 13 or 14 times per century, much more frequently than transits of Venus, primarily because Mercury is closer to the Sun and orbits it more rapidly.

== Scientific investigation ==
The orbit of the planet Mercury lies interior to that of the Earth, and thus it can come into an inferior conjunction with the Sun. When Mercury is near the node of its orbit, it passes through the orbital plane of the Earth. If an inferior conjunction occurs as Mercury is passing through its orbital node, the planet can be seen to pass across the disk of the Sun in an event called a transit. Depending on the chord of the transit and the position of the planet Mercury in its orbit, the maximum length of this event is 7^{h} 50^{m}.

Transit events are useful for studying the planet and its orbit. Examples of the scientific investigations based on transits of Mercury are:

- Measuring the scale of the Solar System.
- Investigations of the variability of the Earth's rotation and of the tidal acceleration of the Moon.
- Measuring the mass of Venus from secular variations in Mercury's orbit.
- Looking for long term variations in the solar radius.
- Investigating the black drop effect, including calling into question the purported discovery of the atmosphere of Venus during the 1761 transit.
- Assessing the likely drop in light level in an exoplanet transit.

=== Occurrence ===
Transits of Mercury can only occur when the Earth is aligned with a node of Mercury's orbit. Currently that alignment occurs within a few days of May 8 (descending node) and November 10 (ascending node), with the angular diameter of Mercury being about 12″ for May transits, and 10″ for November transits. The average date for a transit increases over centuries as a result of Mercury's nodal precession and Earth's axial precession.

Transits of Mercury occur on a regular basis. As explained in 1882 by Newcomb, the interval between passages of Mercury through the ascending node of its orbit is 87.969 days, and the interval between the Earth's passage through that same longitude is 365.254 days. Using continued fraction approximations of the ratio of these values, it can be shown that Mercury will make an almost integral number of revolutions about the Sun over intervals of 6, 7, 13, 33, 46, and 217 years.

In 1894 Crommelin noted that at these intervals, the successive paths of Mercury relative to the Sun are consistently displaced northwards or southwards. He noted the displacements as:

Displacements at subsequent transits
Interval	May transits	November transits
After 6 years	65′ 37″ S	31′ 35″ N
After 7 years	48′ 21″ N	23′ 16″ S
Hence after 13 years (6 + 7)	17′ 16″ S	8′ 19″ N
... 20 years (6 + 2 × 7)	31′ 05″ N	14′ 57″ S
... 33 years (2 × 6 + 3 × 7)	13′ 49″ N	6′ 38″ S
... 46 years (3 × 13 + 7)	3′ 27″ S	1′ 41″ N
... 217 years (14 × 13 + 5 × 7)	0′ 17″ N	0′ 14″ N

Comparing these displacements with the solar diameter (about 31.7′ in May, and 32.4′ in November) the following may be deduced about the interval between transits:

- For May transits, intervals of 6 and 7 years are not possible. For November transits, an interval of 6 years is possible but rare (the last such pair was 1993 and 1999, with both transits being very close to the solar limb), while an interval of 7 years is to be expected.
- An interval of 13 years is to be expected for both May and November transits.
- An interval of 20 years is possible but rare for a May transit, but is to be expected for November transits.
- An interval of 33 years is to be expected for both May and November transits.
- A transit having a similar path across the sun will occur 46 (and 171) years later – for both November and May transits.
- A transit having an almost identical path across the Sun will occur 217 years later – for both November and May transits.

Transits that occur 46 years apart can be grouped into a series. For November transits each series includes about 20 transits over 874 years, with the path of Mercury across the Sun passing further north than for the previous transit. For May transits each series includes about 10 transits over 414 years, with the path of Mercury across the Sun passing further south than for the previous transit. Some authors have allocated a series number to transits on the basis of this 46-year grouping.

Similarly transits that occur 217 years apart can be grouped into a series. For November transits each series would include about 135 transits over 30,000 years. For May transits each series would include about 110 transits over 24,000 years. For both the May and November series, the path of Mercury across the Sun passes further north than for the previous transit. Series numbers have not been traditionally allocated on the basis of the 217 year grouping.

Predictions of transits of Mercury covering many years are available at NASA, SOLEX, and Fourmilab.

=== Observation ===
At inferior conjunction, the planet Mercury subtends an angle of 12″, which, during a transit, is too small to be seen without a telescope. A common observation made at a transit is recording the times when the disk of Mercury appears to be in contact with the limb of the Sun. Those contacts are traditionally referred to as the 1st, 2nd, 3rd and 4th contacts – with the 2nd and 3rd contacts occurring when the disk of Mercury is fully on the disk of the sun. As a general rule, 1st and 4th contacts cannot be accurately detected, while 2nd and 3rd contacts are readily visible within the constraints of the Black Drop effect, irradiation, atmospheric conditions, and the quality of the optics being used.

Observed contact times for transits between 1677 and 1881 are given in S Newcomb's analysis of transits of Mercury. Observed 2nd and 3rd contacts times for transits between 1677 and 1973 are given in Royal Greenwich Observatory Bulletin No.181, 359-420 (1975).

=== Partial ===
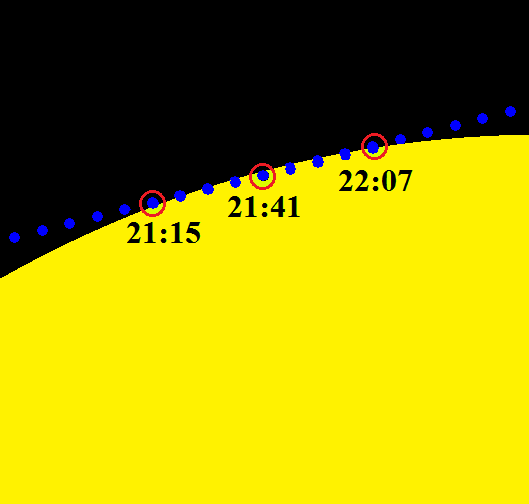
November 15, 1999 simulated transit of Mercury across the Sun.

Sometimes Mercury appears to only graze the Sun during a transit. There are two possible scenarios:

- Firstly, it is possible for a transit to occur such that, at mid-transit, the disk of Mercury has fully entered the disk of the Sun as seen from some parts of the world, while as seen from other parts of the world the disk of Mercury has only partially entered the disk of the Sun. The transit of November 15, 1999 was such a transit, with the transit being a full transit for most of the world, but only a partial transit for Australia, New Zealand, and Antarctica. The previous such transit was on October 28, 743 and the next will be on May 11, 2391. While these events are very rare, two such transits will occur within 2 1/2 years in December 6149 and June 6152.
- Secondly, it is possible for a transit to occur in which, at mid-transit, the disk of Mercury has partially entered the disk of the Sun as seen from some parts of the world, while as seen from other parts of the world Mercury completely misses the Sun. Such a transit last occurred on May 11, 1937, when a partial transit occurred in southern Africa and southern Asia and no transit was visible from Europe and northern Asia. The previous such transit was on October 21, 1342 and the next will be on May 13, 2608.

The possibility that, at mid-transit, Mercury is seen to be fully on the solar disk from some parts of the world, and completely miss the Sun as seen from other parts of the world cannot occur.

== History ==
The first observation of a Mercury transit was observed on November 7, 1631 by Pierre Gassendi. He was surprised by the small size of the planet compared to the Sun. Johannes Kepler had predicted the occurrence of transits of Mercury and Venus in his ephemerides published in 1630.

Images of the November 15, 1999 transit from the Transition Region and Coronal explorer (TRACE) satellite were on Astronomy Picture of the Day (APOD) on November 19. Three APODs featured the May 9, 2016 transit.

The table below includes all historical transits of Mercury from 1605 on:

Past transits of Mercury
Date of mid-transit	Time (UTC)			Notes
Date of mid-transit	Start	Mid	End	Notes
1605 Nov 1	18:47	20:02	21:18	
1615 May 3	06:44	10:09	13:33	
1618 Nov 4	11:10	13:42	16:14	
1628 May 5	14:23	17:32	20:40	
1631 Nov 7	04:39	07:20	10:01	Observed by Pierre Gassendi.
1644 Nov 9	22:55	00:57	02:58	
1651 Nov 3–4	23:09	00:52	02:35	Observed by Jeremy Shakerly in Surat, reported in letter to Henry Osbourne, January 1652. Shakerly is thought to have died in India around 1655.
1661 May 3	13:08	16:54	20:40	Occurred on the day of the coronation of King Charles II of England. Observed by Christiaan Huygens, Nicholas Mercator, and Thomas Streete in Long Acre, London.
1664 Nov 4	15:54	18:32	21:10	
1674 May 7	22:01	00:16	02:31	
1677 Nov 7	09:33	12:11	14:48	Observed by Edmund Halley in St Helena and Richard Towneley in Lancashire to determine solar parallax, also noted by Jean Charles Gallet in Avignon; as reported in a letter from John Flamsteed to Johannes Hevelius May 23, 1678.
1690 Nov 10	03:59	05:43	07:27	
1697 Nov 3	03:40	05:42	07:43	
1707 May 5	19:37	23:32	03:27	Observed by Abraham Sharp.
1710 Nov 6	20:40	23:22	02:03	
1723 Nov 9	14:27	16:59	19:30	
1736 Nov 11	09:11	10:30	11:49	
1740 May 2	21:42	23:02	00:21	
1743 Nov 5	08:15	10:30	12:45	
1753 May 6	02:19	06:13	10:06	Coordinated scientific observations were organized by Joseph-Nicolas Delisle worldwide.
1756 Nov 7	01:28	04:10	06:54	
1769 Nov 9–10	19:23	21:46	00:10	Observed by Charles Green and James Cook from Mercury Bay in New Zealand. Noted that Mercury had little or no atmosphere.
1776 Nov 2	21:03	21:36	22:09	
1782 Nov 12	14:42	15:16	15:50	Observed from Cambridge U.K.
1786 May 4	03:01	05:41	08:21	
1789 Nov 5	12:53	15:19	17:44	
1799 May 7	09:10	12:50	16:31	Observed by Capel Lofft in England.
1802 Nov 9	06:16	08:58	11:41	Observed by William Herschel and Capel Lofft in England.
1815 Nov 12	00:20	02:33	04:46	
1822 Nov 5	01:04	02:25	03:45	
1832 May 5	09:04	12:25	15:47	The Shuckburgh telescope of the Royal Observatory, Greenwich in London was used for the 1832 Mercury transit. It was equipped with a micrometer by Dollond and was used for a report of the events as seen through the small refractor. By observing the transit in combination with timing it and taking measures, a diameter for the planet was taken. They also reported the peculiar effects that they compared to pressing a coin into the Sun. The observer remarked: I afterwards observed, that immediately around the planet there was a dusky tinge, making it appear as if, in a small degree sunk below the sun's surface. — Royal Astronomical Society, Vol II, No. 13
1835 Nov 7	17:35	20:08	22:41	
1845 May 8	16:24	19:37	22:49	Observed by William Lassell.
1848 Nov 9	11:07	13:48	16:28	
1861 Nov 12	05:21	07:19	09:18	Partially observed from Malta by William Lassell.
1868 Nov 5	05:28	07:14	09:00	
1878 May 6	15:16	19:00	22:44	Observed from Greenwich Observatory.
1881 Nov 6–7	22:19	00:57	03:36	Observed by John Tebbutt.
1891 May 8–9	23:57	02:22	04:47	
1894 Nov 10	15:58	18:35	21:11	Observed from Sidmouth, Devon by H.H. Turner and A. F. Lindemann
1907 Nov 14	10:24	12:07	13:50	Observed from Johannesburg by R. T. A. Innes Telescopes used at the Paris Observatory included: Foucault-Eichens reflector (40 centimetres (16 in) aperture); Foucault-Eichens reflector (20 centimetres (7.9 in) aperture); Martin-Eichens reflector (40 centimetres (16 in) aperture); Several small refractors; The telescopes were mobile and were placed on the terrace for the several observations.
1914 Nov 7	09:57	12:03	14:09	Seen by several observers across the U.K. including A. Grace Cook and T. E. R. Phillips.
1924 May 8–9	21:44	01:41	05:38	Final stages observed by Basil Brown.
1927 Nov 10	03:02	05:46	08:29	Final stages observed from the U.K.
1937 May 11	08:53	08:59	09:06	Only visible as partial transit in Southern Africa, Southern Arabia, South Asia, and Western Australia.
1940 Nov 11–12	20:49	23:21	01:53	Observed from New South Wales.
1953 Nov 14	15:37	16:54	18:11	Observed from the Royal Observatory at the Cape of Good Hope.
1957 May 5–6	23:59	01:14	02:30	
1960 Nov 7	14:34	16:53	19:12	
1970 May 9	04:19	08:16	12:13	
1973 Nov 10	07:47	10:32	13:17	
1986 Nov 13	01:43	04:07	06:31	
1993 Nov 6	03:06	03:57	04:47	This brief transit was only visible from the south pole.
1999 Nov 15	21:15	21:41	22:07	Partial transit in Australia, Antarctica, and New Zealand's South Island.
2003 May 7	05:13	07:52	10:32	
2006 Nov 8	19:12	21:41	00:10	
2016 May 9	11:12	14:57	18:42	Entire transit in S. America, eastern N. America, western Europe; part of transit everywhere else except Australia and far eastern Asia.
2019 Nov 11	12:35	15:20	18:04	
Future transits of Mercury
Date of mid-transit	Time (UTC)			Notes
Date of mid-transit	Start	Mid	End	Notes
2032 Nov 13	06:41	08:54	11:07	
2039 Nov 7	07:17	08:46	10:15	
2049 May 7	11:03	14:24	17:44	
2052 Nov 8–9	23:53	02:29	05:06	
2062 May 10–11	18:16	21:36	00:57	
2065 Nov 11–12	17:24	20:06	22:48	
2078 Nov 14	11:42	13:41	15:39	
2085 Nov 7	11:42	13:34	15:26	
2095 May 8–9	17:20	21:05	00:50	
2098 Nov 10	04:35	07:16	09:57	
2108 May 12	01:40	04:16	06:52	
2111 Nov 14–15	22:15	00:53	03:30	
2124 Nov 15	16:49	18:28	20:07	

== See also ==
- Mercury Passing Before the Sun, 1914 painting
- Transit of Mercury from Mars
- Transit of minor planets
- Transit of Venus
- Vulcan (hypothetical planet)

== Gallery ==
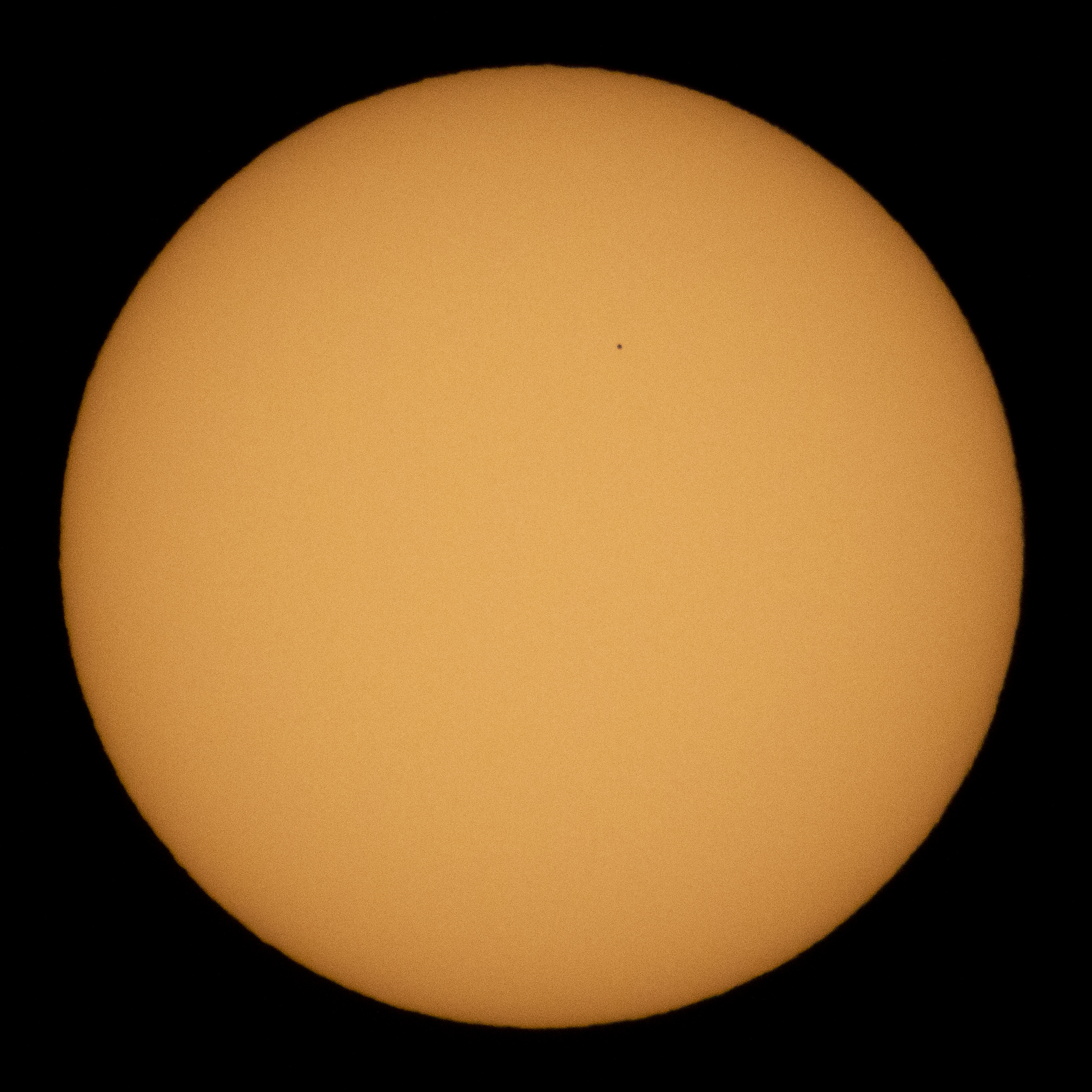
Transit of Mercury on November 11, 2019

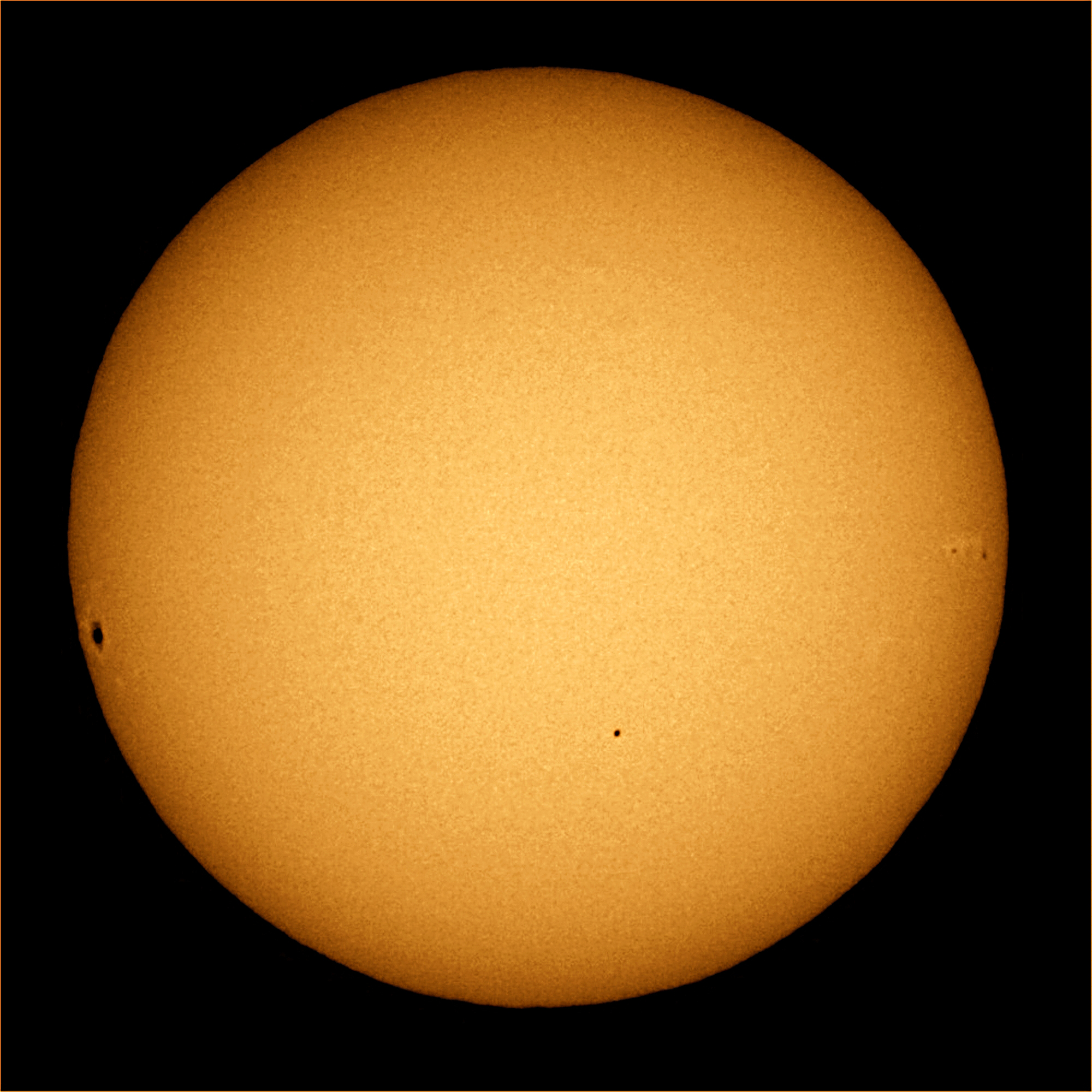
Transit of Mercury on November 8, 2006 with sunspots #921, 922, and 923
