= Manifesto of Futurism =

1909 artistic manifesto by Filippo Tommaso Marinetti

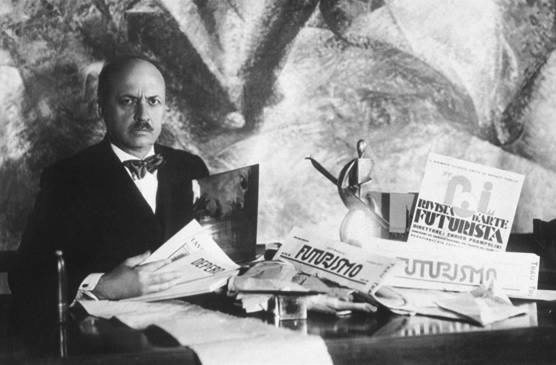
Filippo Tommaso Marinetti, author of the manifesto

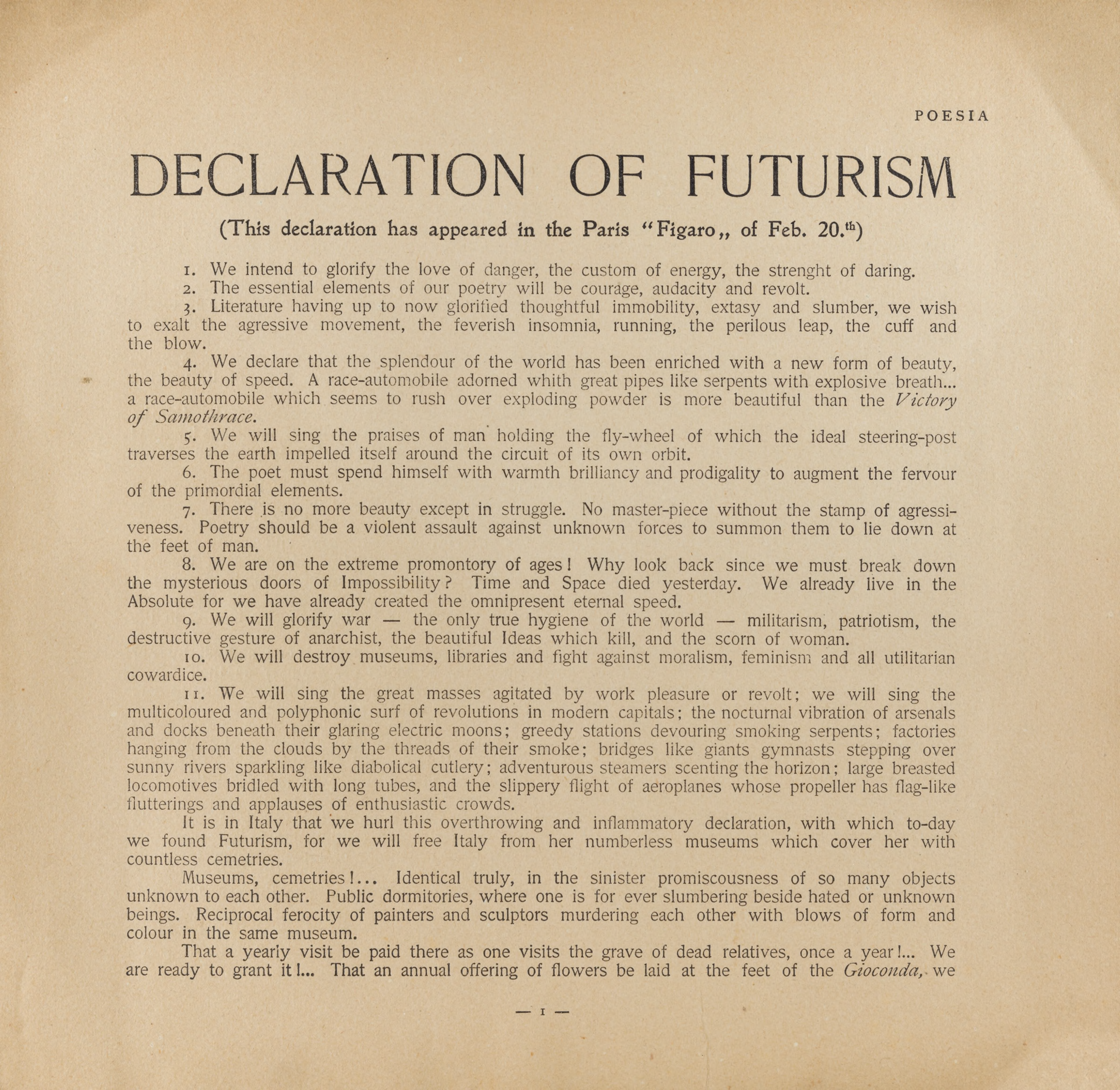
The first page of the English version in Poesia

The Manifesto of Futurism (Italian: Manifesto del Futurismo) is a manifesto written by the Italian poet Filippo Tommaso Marinetti, published in 1909. In it, Marinetti expresses an artistic philosophy called Futurism, which rejected the past and celebrated speed, machinery, violence, youth, and industry. The manifesto also advocated for the modernization and cultural rejuvenation of Italy.

== Publication ==
Marinetti wrote the manifesto in the autumn of 1908, and it first appeared as a preface to a volume of his poems, published in Milan in January 1909. It was published in the Italian newspaper Gazzetta dell'Emilia in Bologna on 5 February 1909, and then in French as Manifeste du futurisme (Manifesto of Futurism) in the newspaper Le Figaro on 20 February 1909. The April 1909 issue of Marinetti's Poesia focused on the manifesto, and the Italian and French versions were reprinted in March 1912 alongside the English version. In April 1909, the Madrid-based magazine Prometeo published the Spanish translation of the manifesto, which was translated by Ramón Gómez de la Serna.

== Meaning ==
This manifesto was published well before the occurrence of the 20th-century events commonly associated with its potential meaning. However, the political movements underlying these events were already well-established and undoubtedly informed Marinetti's thinking, while his publication subsequently influenced them. Most notably, the rise of Italian Fascism, which the manifesto is widely seen as a precursor to, and Mussolini, who often quoted Marinetti. At the time of its publication, the manifesto was frequently cited as an "imagining of the future" for some of these political movements, glorifying violence and conflict, and calling for the destruction of cultural institutions like museums and libraries.

The founding manifesto did not include a positive artistic program, which the Futurists aimed to establish in their subsequent Technical Manifesto of Futurist Painting (1914). This commitment to a "universal dynamism" was intended to be directly represented in painting. In reality, objects are not separate from one another or their surroundings: "The sixteen people around you in a rolling motor bus are in turn and at the same time one, ten four three; they are motionless and they change places. ... The motor bus rushes into the houses which it passes, and in their turn, the houses throw themselves upon the motor bus and are blended with it."

== Women in Futurism ==
Several women were active in the Futurist movement and contributed to its manifestos. Benedetta Cappa Marinetti worked in ceramics, glass, paint, and metal to explore the concept of aeropainting. She also co-wrote the Manifesto of Tattilismo alongside her husband, Filippo Tommaso Marinetti. The manifesto asserts that art is meant to be touched and experienced with the body. Other prominent female futurists include Valentine de Saint Point and Enif Robert, who have only begun to gain recognition from art historians within the past fifty years. In the early stages of futurism, participating women were restrained to minor contributions at most, withstanding the fact that their projects were also required to be sponsored or directed by men.

Valentine de Saint Point, a twentieth century dancer, artist, thinker and writer, was notably radical at the time for challenging prevalent sexual stereotypes and was inspired greatly by the women's movement. She was also active as a public speaker, her work and poetry piquing the interest of Filippo Tommaso Marinetti who managed later to enlist her into the Futurist movement's directorate and goaded her to write the Manifesto of the Futurist Woman.

== See also ==
- Futurist The Art of Noises Manifesto of Noise Music
- Futurist Painting: Technical Manifesto
- Du "Cubisme" Manifesto of Cubism
- Fascist Manifesto
- Art manifesto
