= Valentine de Saint-Point =

French artist (1875–1953)

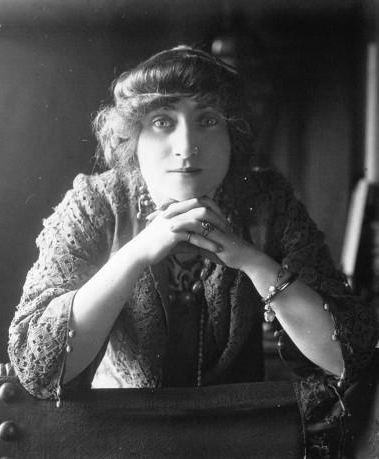
- Valentine de Saint-Point in 1914
- Born: Anna Jeanne Valentine Marianne Glans de Cessiat-Vercell; 16 February 1875; Lyon, France
- Died: 28 March 1953 (aged 78); Cairo, Egypt
- Known for: Writing, painting
- Notable work: Manifesto of Futurist Woman
- Movement: Futurism
- Spouses: Florian Theophile Perrenot (m. 1893–1899) Charles Dumont (m. 1900–1904)
- Partner: Ricciotto Canudo

Signature
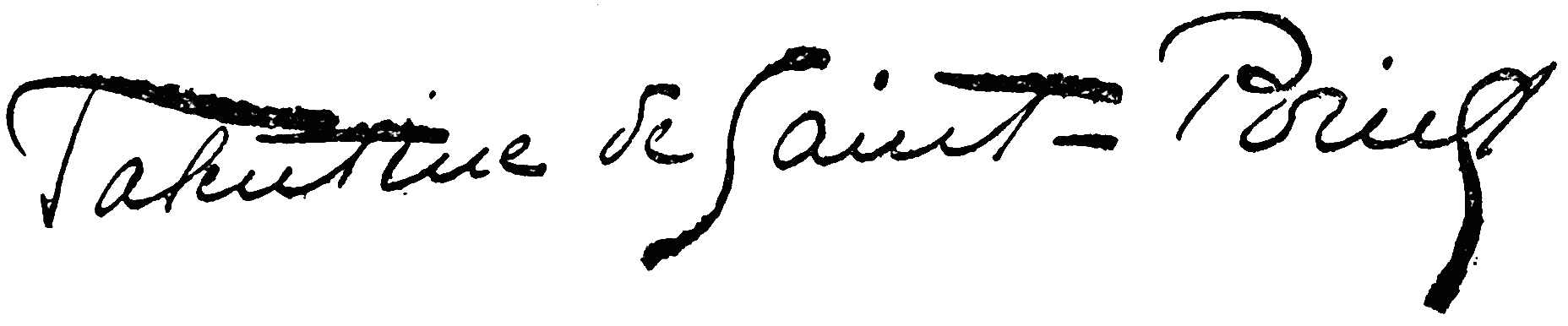

Valentine de Saint-Point (née Anna Jeanne Valentine Marianne Glans de Cessiat-Vercell; 16 February 1875, Lyon – 28 March 1953, Cairo) was a French writer, poet, painter, playwright, art critic, choreographer, lecturer and journalist. She is primarily known for being the first woman to have written a futurist manifesto. Additionally, she was also active in Parisian salons and the associated literary and artistic movements of the Belle Epoque. Her writings and performances of La Métachorie demonstrated her theory of "a total fusion of the arts." Performed veiled, it is an exploration of the body's relationship to nature and geometric archetypes that govern physical form and movement. Finding a similar universality in Islamic art, she converted to Islam and moved to Alexandria where she also became involved in Middle Eastern politics, writing prolifically as an advocate for Egyptian and Syrian independence from French rule. She died at the age of 78. Her Muslim name was Ruhiyya Nur al-Din. She is buried next to René Guénon.

== Early life ==
Valentine is the only child of Alice de Glans de Cessiat and Charles-Joseph Vercell, and is by maternal descent a great-grandniece of the poet Alphonse de Lamartine. The pseudonym "de Saint-Point," which she took when she entered the literary world, refers to a small town in Mâconnais, in the Cluny area where a castle of her famous ancestor was located. In 1883, her father died. Alice de Glans de Cessiat then returned to Mâcon with her daughter, who grew up there surrounded by her grandmother and her tutor.

In 1893, Valentine married Florian Théophile Perrenot, a professor 14 years her senior, whom she would follow as he was transferred. The following year, he was appointed to Lons-le-Saunier, where Valentine met Charles Dumont, professor of philosophy and colleague of her husband, who would become her lover and second husband later on. In 1897, Perrenot was appointed to Corsica, the first meeting between Valentine and the Mediterranean. A final transfer took Perrenot to Niort, where he died in the summer of 1899.

== Move to Paris ==
The 24-year-old widow moved to Paris where she reestablished her relationship with Charles Dumont, future minister of the Third Republic. The couple married 20 June 1900 at City Hall in Paris's 1st arrondissement. In 1902, she organized a literary salon where she rubbed shoulders with Gabriele D'Annunzio, who nicknamed her "the purple muse," Rachilde, Natalie Clifford Barney, Paul Fort, Gabriel Tarde, who saw her as "an amiable madness of nature," Alphonse Mucha and Auguste Rodin, for whom she posed, as well as other artists and politicians. Her friendship with the famous sculptor had importance in his artistic life, as evidenced by their correspondence. He called her the "goddess of the flesh of his inspiration in marble". She celebrated his work with poems (The Thinker and His Hands published in Poems of Pride in 1908) and an article, The dual Personality of Auguste Rodin, published in La Nouvelle Revue in November 1906. Rodin was often the guest of honor at her parties, contributing by his presence to make them prestigious.

In 1903, during a seance, which were in vogue at the time, she met Ricciotto Canudo, an Italian poet and writer born in Bari in 1877. Canudo was also the review director for Europe Artiste and Monjoie; which was a critical element in regards to Cubist studies. Additionally, Ricciotto Canudo became the author of the Manifesto of Cerebrist Art. Shortly thereafter, she filed for divorce, which was delivered on 20 January 1904. Several reasons for the divorce were circulated, including the fact that she posed almost nude for Mucha and Rodin, and the courtship of Canudo. The applicant said that she wanted to pursue her artistic vocation, and that she wanted to live independently. As Valentine de Saint-Point was heavily inspired by the innovational works of Canudo and Marinetti, she began her Futurist practice before the wave of Futurism spread between 1909 and 1914. Valentine had developed her own practice within Futurism by taking inspiration from Canudo's idea of it being "conceptual, eroticized, and sensual," and Marinetti's idea of it being "destructive, provocative, and energetic." She took the name of Valentine Saint-Point and began a common-law relationship with Canudo, who actively supported her literary debut.

== Literary debut ==
In January 1905 she published an article in The New journal entitled, Lamartine Unknown (Lamartine Inconnu), the title of which alluded to her poetic lineage. Following this she published her first collection of poetry, Poems of the Sea and the Sun which had been inspired by her trip to Spain with Canudo the previous year. In 1906, A Love, the first part of a trilogy, was well received by critics. She began her collaborations with several magazines such as The Artist Europe, The Mercury, The New Review, The Age, La Plume, and Gil Blas, whose founder was the poet Filippo Tommaso Marinetti. Incest which appeared at the beginning of the year 1907 collected mixed reactions from the public and critics. The theme of a mother initiating her son to physical love was the most controversial. The year 1909 was dedicated to theater. 28 May, Valentine Theatre Arts presents a one-act drama, The Fallen which was published by The New Review. Criticism was harsh, but the work was the first part of her dramatic trilogy The Theater of Women. In 1910 she published A woman and desire, an unacknowledged autobiographical confession that enabled her to express a few truths about female psychology and women's roles in society. In 1911, she moved into a studio at 19 rue de Tourville where her art would become denser and its most popular. She participated for the first time in the Salon des Indépendants, where she exhibited paintings and woodcuts until 1914.

On 17 February 1912, she inaugurated her 'Apollonian' parties, which were reported in the press. Rachilde gave a reading of his play, The Seller of Sunshine and Filippo Tommaso Marinetti recited poems. Others who were present included, Philippe Berthelot, Saint-Pol-Roux, Boccioni, Gino Severini, Canudo, Florent Schmitt, Countess Venturini, and Mendes-Cattule.

In addition to her artistic works, Valentine de Saint-Point wrote pieces which discuss the ironic themes of love and death. To further elaborate, some of her writings compare and contrast the themes of love beside, what was at the time, a theoretical debate on the death of the avant-garde movement. Both her and Tommaso Marinetti are well known futurist artists who gave their hand at writing, particularly texts which spoke against love. There has been debate in regards to whether the writings are literal or theoretical, therefore these writings have incited a non-historical approach to examining such works. The works of Saint-Point and Marinetti have caused a stir amongst literary and art historians, in an attempt to determine the relationship between death and life in the study of the avant-garde.

== Connection to Futurism ==
In 1912 she published the Manifesto of Futurist Woman, which Saint-Point wrote in response to the misogynist ideas in Marinetti's Manifesto of Futurism. It was read on 27 June at the Salle Gaveau, surrounded by the figureheads of the movement. The manifesto begins with the statement, "Humanity is mediocre. The majority of women are neither superior nor inferior to the majority of men. They are all equal. They all merit the same scorn."

Although she joined the Futurists in celebrating the virtues of virility, she also wrote:

It is absurd to divide humanity into men and women. It is composed only of femininity and masculinity. Every superman, every hero, no matter how epic, how much of a genius, or how powerful, is the prodigious expression of a race and an epoch only because he is composed at once of feminine and masculine elements, of femininity and masculinity: that is, a complete being...

It is the same way with any collectivity and any moment in humanity, just as it is with individuals. The fecund periods, when the most heroes and geniuses come forth from the terrain of culture in all its ebullience, are rich in masculinity and femininity.

Those periods that had only wars, with few representative heroes because the epic breath flattened them out, were exclusively virile periods; those that denied the heroic instinct and, turning toward the past, annihilated themselves in dreams of peace, were periods in which femininity was dominant. We are living at the end of one of these periods. What is most lacking in women as in men is virility.

That is why Futurism, even with all its exaggerations, is right.

Saint-Point advocated the concept of the woman-warrior, as opposed to the traditional sentimental feminine ideals such as the "good mother," and she conceptualized the "Überwoman" (sur-femme), as a counterpart to the Nietzschean Übermensch (surhomme). She also addressed the theme of lust, described by Saint-Point as "a force". Saint-Point would develop this theme into a second manifesto, the Futurist Manifesto of Lust (Manifeste futuriste de la luxure), which was published a year later. These writings, translated throughout Europe, were a sensation and put women at the center of the debates of the Futurist movement, which was increasingly popular. In this the Futurist Manifesto of Lust, she considered two main directions of women's existential choices in futurism. It also maintained that women represent the great galvanizing principle and that "lust when viewed without moral preconceptions and as an essential part of life's dynamism, is a force". For Saint Point, the synthesis of the sensory and the sensual leads to the liberation of the spirit. But true to her intellectual independence, Saint-Point declared in January 1914 in Hansard: "I am not a futurist, and I've never been, I do not belong to any school." Her thoughts on futurism, however, was said to have been enriched by Canudo's conceptual, eroticized, and sensual perspective and Marinetti's destructive and provocative view.

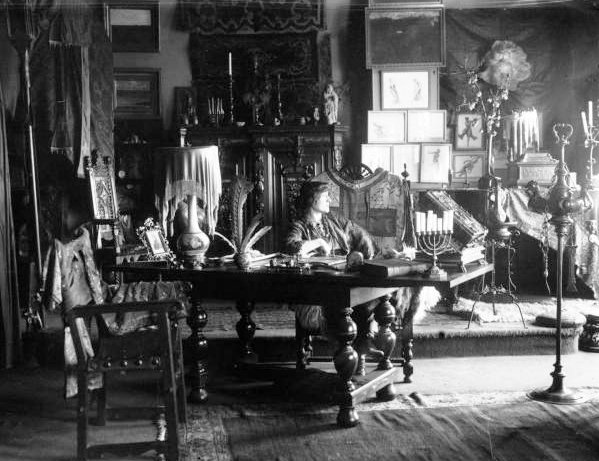
Valentine de Saint-Point in her living room in 1914

== Métachorie ==
In May 1913 Theatre of the Women was published in Canudo's arts magazine Montjoie!, which published articles and drawings by many of the leading artists of the time. This work, which presented an independent conceptualization of female avant-garde aesthetics, was intended as a trilogy but was never finished. Saint-Point would continue to develop her ideas on theater and dance, which would eventually become La Métachorie, which she called "a total fusion of the arts." Saint-Point's first exhibition of Métachorie took the form of a live performance on 20 December 1913 at the Theatre-Léon Poirier (Comédie des Champs-Elysées) in Paris. The show was a combination of light, sound, dance, and poetry. Saint-Point was almost nude, as she only wore silk veil pieces around portions of her body and face. The aim of her costumes was to create abstract, geometric shapes, so that her movements were the primary concern of the audience, rather than the emotion of her face; this was something that was particularly important to her, as the Futurists were not interested in the idea of expressing sentimentality or emotion within their works. The music was taken from Florent Schmitt's La Guerre dans les airs, Debussy's Demoiselle élue, Satie's Les pantines dansent and Hymne au soleil, and Pratella's La guerra. The program consisted of four sections: Poèmes d'amour, Poèmes d'atmosphère, Poèmes panthéistes, Poèmes de guerre. Initially, the stage was cast in penumbre. A dark figure was visible against a cabalistic emblem. Other signs in the form of shapes (a triangle, rectangle, circle, trapezium, parallelogram, octagon, and polyhedron) were projected onto the backdrop as the poem progressed.

In October 1916, she published an article of the same name in Montjoie!. In it, she wrote:

I write my dance graphically as an orchestral score. And if wanting to create a dance really essential, I expressed the general spirit of my poems by a natural geometric stylization is that geometry is the science of lines, that is to say, the essence of all visual arts, like arithmetic is the science of numbers, that is to say the very essence of rhythmic arts: music and poetry. ... in the Métachorie, is the idea which is the essence, the soul. Dance and music are suggested by it, we can say that Métachorie form a living organism, whose idea is the soul, the skeleton dance, music and flesh.

In 1917, Saint-Point presented Métachorie at New York's Metropolitan Opera House. Saint Point is also noted for wearing masks, which has been interpreted as her way of shifting the focus away from her face to her body during her performances.

== First World War ==
At the outbreak of the First World War in 1914, Ricciotto Canudo, Guillaume Apollinaire, and Blaise Cendrars appealed to other foreign artists living in Paris to join the French army. Canudo enlisted in the army and fought in Macedonia. Saint-Point joined the ranks of the Red Cross, and worked as secretary to Rodin. In 1916 she left France in the company of Vivian Postel du Mas and Daniel Chennevière (Dane Rudhyar). They went to Spain where they spend the summer months with the artist community based in Barcelona around Albert Gleizes, Francis Picabia and others. In November 1916 they set sail for the United States. Saint-Point was considering the possibility of establishing centers of dance inspired by her choreographic work, and gave a series of conferences across the country on Auguste Rodin, who had died shortly before.

== Move to the Mediterranean ==
In 1918, she returned to France after a stay in Morocco, where she had converted to Islam. Back in Paris, the world she knew was gone, including her ties with old friends. Canudo had been wounded in the forehead and their relationship turned into friendship. Between 1919 and 1924, she made several trips to Corsica, where between her reading, including Helena Petrovna Blavatsky's The Secret Doctrine, and meditating, Saint-Point attempted to create a College of Elites who would work towards the formation of a 'Mediterranean spirit,' or a merger the west and east. The project failed. Saint-Point's mother died in Macon in 1920, severing her last link with Burgundy. Then in 1923, Canudo died. In 1924 she published her last novel, The Secret. She was almost fifty years old at this time and nothing remained to connect her to France.

At the end of 1924, accompanied by Vivian Postel du Mas and Jeanne Canudo, the widow of her former lover, Saint-Point moved to Cairo where her fame had preceded her. She joined a group of young writers and essayists, who organized debates, conferences and theatrical events. She wrote for various newspapers such as Liberty, and lectured. Along with Jeanne Canudo, she created a "center idéiste" which combines elements of her "College of Elites". End of 1925, she launched the publication of the Phoenix, a review the East's rebirth which cast a critical eye on Western policies in the Near and Middle East. She took up the causes of the Muslim world and Arab nationalism, challenging European imperialism and the cultural hegemony of the West.

In 1927 she wrote the preface of a book on Saad Zaghloul, and in 1928, The Truth About Syria by a witness was published in France. Saint-Point's political writings generated fierce feuds within the Francophone community. She was accused of working against the interests of France and of being a spy in the pay of the Bolsheviks. Meanwhile, conferences organized by the "center idéiste" ended several times in violent disputes, which exasperated the Egyptian authorities and prompted them to expel Canudo Jeanne and Vivian Postel du Mas. While she was in Jerusalem in 1928, after spending two months in Lebanon to treat her health which had been shattered by the attacks to which she had been subjected, she was informed that she would be banned from returning to Egypt. She appealed to Philippe Berthelot, secretary general of the Quai d'Orsay. Eventually, the Ambassador in Cairo persuaded the authorities to allow her to remain in Egypt, but in return she would have to cease all political activities. In 1930 she became friends with René Guénon who just moved to Cairo.

The end of her life was spent in the study of religion and meditation, while living in destitution, giving occasional consultations on dowsing and acupuncture. She died 28 March 1953 and is buried in the cemetery of El-Imam Leissi in Muslim tradition and as the Rawhiya Nour el-Deen ("zealot of divine light").

== Exhibitions ==
Saint-Point's work was included in the 2021 exhibition Women in Abstraction at the Centre Pompidou.

== Bibliography ==
Poetry

- Poems of the Sea and Sun, Messein-Vanier (1905)
- Poems of pride, editions of the Abbey & Figuiere (1908)
- The Pale Orb, Eugene Figuiere (1911)
- War, a heroic poem, Figuiere (1912)
- The caravan of dreams, Week Egyptian, Cairo (1934)
- Théo-Futurisme, (?), Le Caire

Novels

- Trilogy of Love and Death: A Love (1906), An Incest (1907), A death (1909), Messein-Vanier
- A Woman and desire, Messein-Vanier (1910)
- Thirst and mirages, Figuiere (1912)
- The Secret concerns, Messein Albert (1924)

Theater

- The Fallen (one-act play, 1909)
- The Soul or the Agony of imperial Messalina tragedy in three times with incidental music, preceded by speeches about the tragedy and the tragic verse, Figuiere (1929)
- Manifestos, theoretical texts and tests
- Futurist Manifesto of Women (25 March 1912)
- Futurist Manifesto of Lust (11 January 1913)
- Theater of the Woman (1913)
- The Métachorie (1913)
- Saad Zaghloul, the "father of the people" Egyptian Foulad Yeghen, preface by Valentine de Saint-Point, Cahiers de France (1927)
- The Truth about Syria by a witness, Cahiers de France, New Series (1929)
- The Phoenix, Journal of the Eastern renaissance, led by Valentine de Saint-Point (1925 to 1927)

Reissues

- Manifesto of the Futurist Woman, followed by Futurist Manifesto of Lust, Love and lust, The Theater of the Woman, My choreographic debut, The Métachorie, texts compiled, annotated and afterwords by Jean-Paul Morel, Arabian Nights Publishing, Paris, 2005.

== Monographs (Theses and Essays) ==
- Bentivoglio, Mirella and Zoccoli, Franca. Women Artists of Italian Futurism: Almost Lost to History, Arts Midmarch Press, New York, 1997.
- Contarini, Silvia, "Valentine de Saint-Point: du Futurisme à l'anticolonialisme", in Modernity and Modernism in the Mediterranean World (eds Luca Somigli and Domenico Pierpaolo), Legas, Toronto, 2006, 293–304.
- Le Bret, Henri. Essay on Valentine de Saint-Point, Aloes, Nice, 1923.
- Mallette, Karla. Textuality and Sexuality in Italian Futurism, Amherst MA, 1985.
- Moore, Nancy Gaye. Valentine de Saint-Point: "La Femme Integrale" and her quest for a modern tragic theater in Agony of Messalina (1907) and La Métachorie (1913), Dissertation for the degree Doctor of Philosophy, Field of Theatre and Drama, Evanston, Illinois, 1997.
- Reboul, Jacques. Notes on the morality of a "harbinger", Valentine de Saint-Point, Eugene Figuiere, Paris, 1912.
- Richard de la Fuente, Veronique. Valentine de Saint Point, a poet in the forefront and Futuristic méditerranéiste, Edition Albères, Ceret, 2003.
- Sina, Adrien (editor and curator). Feminine Futures: Performance, Dance, War, Politics And Eroticism, Les Presses du réel, Dijon, 2011. Catalog of exposition, New York, Italian Cultural Institute, 3 November 2009 – 7 January 2010. Texts in French, English, Italian, German. ISBN 978-2-84066-351-5
- Verdier, Abel. Seeking the truth, Paris, 1978.
- Zouari, Fawzia. The caravan of dreams (fictional biography), Olivier Orban, Paris, 1990.
