= Abstract Speed + Sound =

Painting by Giacomo Balla

- Velocità astratta + rumore (Italian)
- Artist: Giacomo Balla
- Year: 1913–1914
- Type: oil on millboard
- Dimensions: 54.5 cm × 76.5 cm (21.5 in × 30.1 in)
- Location: Peggy Guggenheim Collection, Venice
- Accession: 76.2553.31

Abstract Speed + Sound (Italian: Velocità astratta + rumore) is a painting by Italian Futurist painter Giacomo Balla, one of several studies of motion created by the artist in 1913–14.

== Description ==
The painting evokes the sensation of the passing of an automobile, with crisscrossing lines representing sound. It may be the second in a triptych narrating the passage of a racing car through a landscape, beginning with Abstract Speed (Velocità + paesaggio) (1913) and ending with Abstract Speed – The Car Has Passed (1913). The three paintings share indications of a single landscape, and each painting is continued onto its frame.

== Inspiration ==
Balla chose the automobile as a symbol of speed, reflecting the statement of Futurist founder Filippo Tommaso Marinetti's 1909 first manifesto: "The world's splendor has been enriched by a new beauty: the beauty of speed... A roaring automobile...that seems to run on shrapnel, is more beautiful than the Victory of Samothrace."

== Legacy ==
The painting is said to have captured the ideals of Italian Futurism. It was featured on the 1980 British television series 100 Great Paintings, which presented five paintings from each of 20 thematic groups.

The Philadelphia Museum of Art houses an apparent study for the painting, a 23.5 cm × 33 cm (9.3 in × 13.0 in) work in watercolor and graphite.

== See also ==
- List of works by Giacomo Balla
- Aeropittura
