= Dynamism of a Dog on a Leash =

1912 painting by Giacomo Balla

- Dinamismo di un cane al guinzaglio (Italian)
- Artist: Giacomo Balla
- Year: 1912
- Medium: oil on canvas
- Subject: A dog on a leash
- Dimensions: 89.8 cm × 109.8 cm (35.4 in × 43.2 in)
- Location: Buffalo AKG Art Museum, Buffalo

Dynamism of a Dog on a Leash (Italian: Dinamismo di un cane al guinzaglio), sometimes called Dog on a Leash or Leash in Motion, is a 1912 oil painting by Italian Futurist painter Giacomo Balla. It was influenced by the artist's fascination with chronophotographic studies of animals in motion. It is considered one of his best-known works, and one of the most important works in Futurism, though it received mixed critical reviews. The painting has been in the collection of the Buffalo AKG Art Museum since 1984.

== Description and context ==
The painting depicts a dachshund on a leash and the feet of a lady walking it, both in rapid motion as indicated by the blurring and multiplication of their parts.

Chronophotographic studies of animals in motion, created by scientist Étienne-Jules Marey beginning in the 1880s, led to the introduction in painting of techniques to show motion, such as blurring, multiplication, and superimposition of body parts, imitating these mechanical images. Such multiplication can be seen in Marcel Duchamp's Nude Descending a Staircase, No. 2, painted the same year as Balla's painting.

Balla's interest in capturing a single moment in a series of planes was inspired by his fascination with chronophotography. In later, more abstract works created during World War I, Balla used planes of color to suggest movement.

The decomposition of movement into moments in time which Balla created in Dynamism of a Dog on a Leash likely inspired the photodynamic technique of Futurist photographer Anton Giulio Bragaglia.

Published in Arthur Jerome Eddy, Cubists and Post-impressionism, A.C. McClurg & Co. Chicago, 1914, p. 165

== Provenance ==
The painting was exhibited in the Galerie Der Sturm's Autumn Salon in Berlin from September to December 1913, accompanied by a photograph of the scene. It was sold by the artist in 1938 to the industrialist Anson Conger Goodyear. Upon his death in 1964, Goodyear bequeathed the painting jointly to his son, George F. Goodyear, with a life interest, and to the Albright–Knox Art Gallery in Buffalo, New York. The gallery acquired the painting in December 1984.

== Critical responses ==
In 1943, artist Cornelia Geer LeBoutillier criticized the painting, comparing it unfavorably with Duchamp's Nude Descending a Staircase (a work with which it is often compared) and Picasso's Portrait of Daniel-Henry Kahnweiler, calling Balla's work "more crude, less mature, almost childish indeed ... Balla takes himself and his dog so seriously, so studiedly, that it is doubtful that any pleasure has ever come out of it anywhere; certainly no movement has." Writing in 1947, critic Henry R. Hope called Dynamism of a Dog on a Leash "a cliché of modern art". Writer Geoffrey Wagner declared Balla's painting to be anathema to the Vorticist aesthetic of British painter Wyndham Lewis, who criticized Futurism for its "romantic excess" and dynamism. However, S. I. Hayakawa credited Balla's "classic" for its introduction of the time dimension in its representation of its subject.

In 2009, art critic Tom Lubbock declared the painting "one of the most striking" chronophotography-inspired works, pointing to several features which create a comical effect: the "abrupt close-up" on a trivial subject—a "twee prim sausage dog"—which might have been a single detail in an Impressionist street scene; the bathetic juxtaposition of the word dynamism, "with its connotations of heroism, of the mighty modern machine world" against that subject; the cropping of the owner at the knee, giving a dog's view (and anticipating Tom and Jerry cartoons); and the apparently frenetic motion of the dog's limbs and tail coupled with the stillness of its body, suggesting little forward progress. Lubbock describes Balla's motion effects as "creating new sensations and new phenomena", and evoking the motion of shuffling cards and the embodiment of ghosts.

In 2014, art critic Robert C. Morgan declared Dynamism of a Dog on a Leash, along with Gino Severini's paintings Blue Dancer and Dynamic Hieroglyphic of the Bal Tabarin, to be "probably the most elegant and accurate works ever painted in the Futurist tradition." He credits these works with "moving status into kinesis, stillness into motion, and thus giving life to culture, bringing it back from the bucolic ornaments of the 19th century."

== Influence outside art ==
A 2002 research paper on machine vision by computer scientists Roman Goldenberg, Ron Kimmel, Ehud Rivlin, and Michael Rudzsky used Futurism's techniques of motion, as embodied by Dynamism of a Dog on a Leash, to illustrate the mathematical representation of periodic motion using a small number of eigenshapes.

== See also ==
- List of works by Giacomo Balla
