= The Hand of the Violinist =

Painting by Giacomo Balla

The Hand of the Violinist (The Rhythms of the Bow)
- Artist: Giacomo Balla
- Year: 1912
- Medium: oil on canvas
- Subject: The hand of a violinist in play
- Dimensions: 56 cm × 78.3 cm (22 in × 30.8 in)
- Location: Estorick Collection of Modern Italian Art; London

The Hand of the Violinist (The Rhythms of the Bow) is a 1912 painting by Italian Futurist Giacomo Balla, depicting a musician's hand and the neck of a violin "made to look like it's vibrating through space"—blurred and duplicated to suggest the motion of frenetic playing. The painting, representative of Futurism's first wave, exhibits techniques of Divisionism.

== History ==
Balla was inspired to use multiplication to imply motion by the photographic experiments of Eadweard Muybridge and Étienne-Jules Marey. As with other Futurists, he was also inspired by Cubism's methods of capturing multiple perspectives; The Hand of the Violinist has been said to bring the viewer "inside the reverberations of the instrument itself", and has earned comparison with Marcel Duchamp's Nude Descending a Staircase.

From February to August 2014, the painting was part of the exhibit Italian Futurism, 1909–1944: Reconstructing the Universe, at the Guggenheim in New York.
