= Street Light (painting) =

Painting by Giacomo Balla

- Lampada ad arco (Italian)
- Artist: Giacomo Balla
- Year: c. 1910–1911 (dated 1909 on painting)
- Medium: Oil on canvas
- Subject: An electric street light
- Dimensions: 174.7 cm × 114.7 cm (68.8 in × 45.2 in)
- Location: Museum of Modern Art, New York City, US
- Accession: 23715 (NCSU Libraries)

Street Light (also known as The Street Light: Study of Light and Street Lamp (Suffering of a Street Lamp)) (Italian: Lampada ad arco) is a painting by Italian Futurist painter Giacomo Balla, dated 1909, depicting an electric street lamp casting a glow that outshines the crescent moon. The painting was inspired by streetlights at the Piazza Termini in Rome.

== History ==
Lamp posts were a subject of Balla's work as early as 1900–1901. The iconography of a stylized street lamp appeared in a commercial poster in 1910, though it is not known if this work influenced Balla or vice versa. Other sources state that he was inspired to paint after seeing Rome's first electric street lights, the design of which were then universally regarded as looking passéist.

Though dated 1909, Street Light was most likely painted in the latter half of 1911, following Balla's rejection from an art exhibition in Milan. Fellow Futurist Umberto Boccioni encouraged Balla to continue his efforts in Futurism, with an eye to the 1912 Futurist exhibition at the Bernheim-Jeune Gallery in Paris. Though the work is mentioned in the catalog for that exhibition, it was not actually displayed there. The painting was later exhibited by Balla in 1928.

The acquisition of the painting by the Museum of Modern Art in New York was publicly announced on October 17, 1954. The painting, catalogued as object number 7.1954, was included in exhibitions in 1954–55, 1961, 1964, 1971, 1984, and 2012–13. As of 2013, it was not on permanent display. The museum also houses a pencil-and-ink study that Balla made for the painting.

== Context ==
Painted around the time of the organization of the Futurist artists, the work may be seen as a response to Filippo Tommaso Marinetti's 1909 manifesto Uccidiamo il Chiaro di Luna! (Let's Kill the Moonlight!), in which Marinetti writes, "trecento lune elettriche cancellarono coi loro raggi di gesso abbagliante l'antica regina verde degli amori." ("three hundred electric moons wiped out with their dazzling rays of plaster the ancient green queen of love.") Balla's painting is an analytical study of the patterns and colors of a beam of light; it typifies his exploration of light, atmosphere, and motion as a member of the Italian Divisionism movement, in which he was inspired by the Neo-Impressionism of Georges Seurat and Paul Signac. Balla stated of his painting, decades later, that it "demonstrated how romantic moonlight had been surpassed by the light of the modern electric street light. This was the end of Romanticism in art. From my picture came the phrase (beloved by the Futurists): 'We shall kill the light of the moon'."

== Reception and legacy ==
The work is described in the Encyclopædia Britannica as a "dynamic depiction of light", conveying "a sense of speed and urgency that puts [Balla's] paintings in line with Futurism’s fascination with the energy of modern life." It is said to reflect Balla's fascination with artificial light. Art critic Donald Kuspit describes the painting as a "crypto-scientific" study of the emotionally neutral sensation of light and color.

In The End of Night: Searching for Natural Darkness in an Age of Artificial Light, author Paul Bogard contrasts the painting with Van Gogh's 1889 The Starry Night, also at the MoMA; while the latter depicts a deep and dynamic night sky, the sky in Balla's Street Light is submerged into the background by his celebrated artificial light.

== See also ==
- List of works by Giacomo Balla
- Pointillism
- Positivism
