= Poesia (magazine) =

Italian magazine

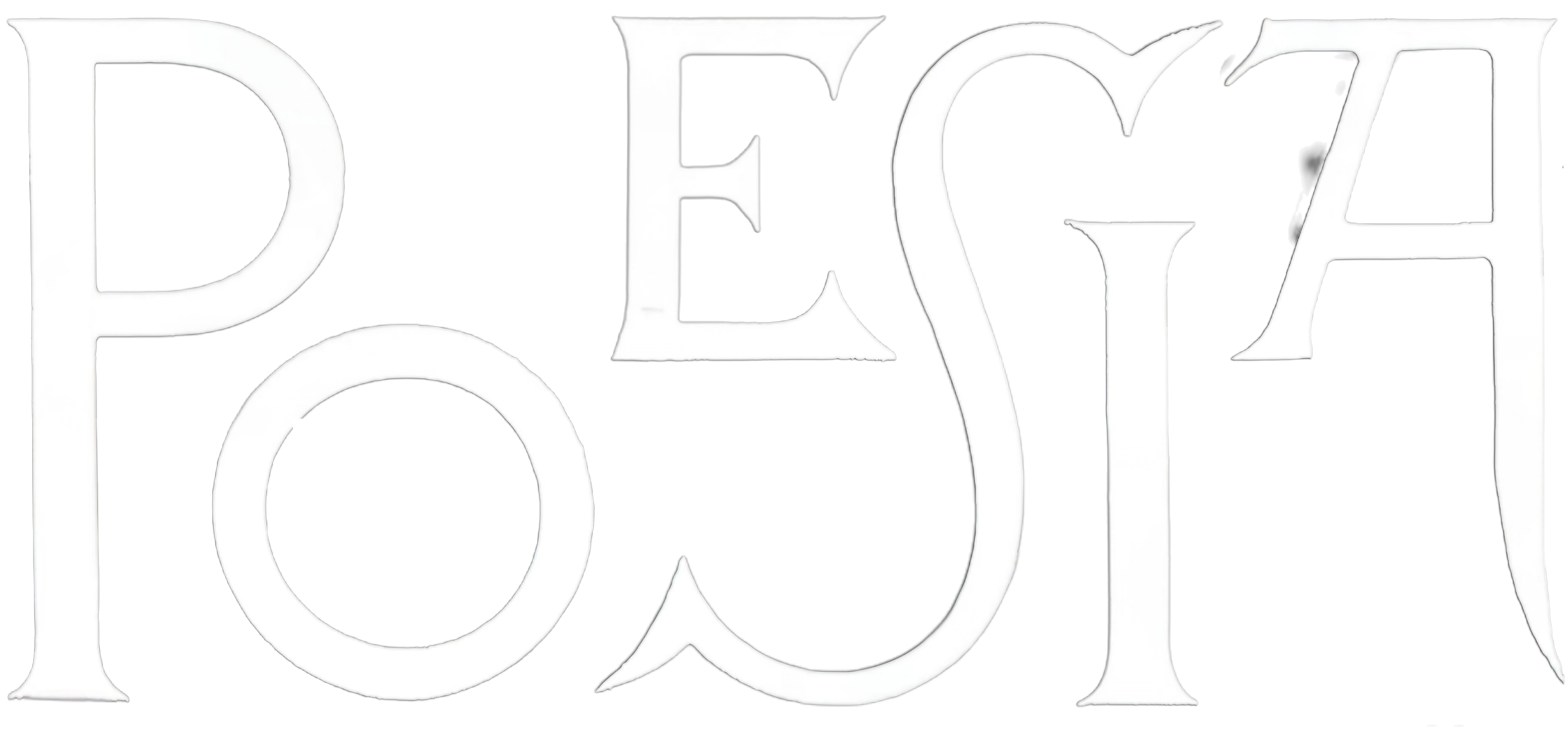
- Categories: Literary magazine
- Frequency: Monthly
- Founder: Filippo Tommaso Marinetti
- Founded: 1905
- Final issue: 1909
- Country: Italy
- Based in: Rome
- Language: Italian

Poesia (Italian: Poetry) is an Italian magazine founded by Filippo Tommaso Marinetti in Milan in 1905 which was closely associated with the Italian Futurist movement. During its early existence a total of thirty-one issues were published until the 1920s. It was headquartered in Verona.

Later Poesia was revived and is still published in Milan. The original magazine supported modern poetry from different nations. It still covers poems by different artists.

== See also ==
- List of magazines in Italy
