= Giacomo Balla =

Italian artist (1871–1958)

- Giacomo Balla
- Born: Giacomo Joseph Balla; 18 July 1871; Turin, Italy
- Died: 1 March 1958 (aged 86); Rome, Italy
- Known for: Painting
- Movement: Futurism

Signature
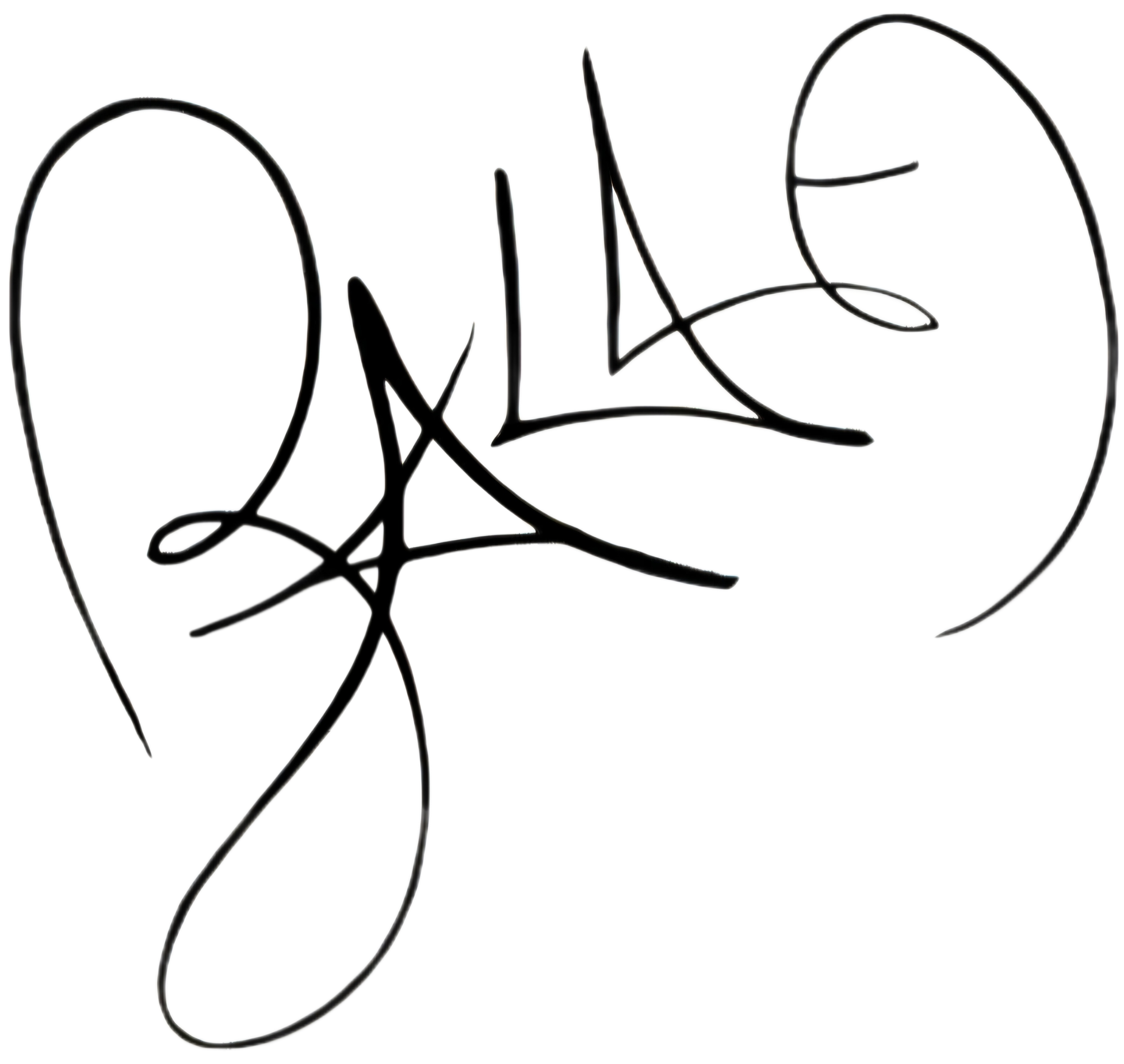

Giacomo Balla (18 July 1871 – 1 March 1958) was an Italian painter, art teacher and poet best known as a key proponent of Futurism. In his paintings, he depicted light, movement and speed. He was concerned with expressing movement in his works, but unlike other leading futurists he was not interested in machines or violence with his works tending towards the witty and whimsical.

== Biography ==
Giacomo Balla was born in Turin, in the Piedmont region of Italy, on 18 July 1871. He was the son of Giovanni Balla, a chemist with an interest in photography, and Lucia Balla. His father died in 1878, after which Balla went to work in a lithography shop to help support his mother.

By age 20, his interest in visual art had developed to such a level that he decided to study painting at local academies, and several of his early works were shown at exhibitions. Following academic studies at the University of Turin, Balla moved to Rome in 1895, where he met and later married Elisa Marcucci. For several years he worked in Rome as an illustrator, caricaturist and portrait painter. In 1899, his work was exhibited at the Venice Biennale, and in the ensuing years, his art was shown at major exhibitions in Rome and Venice, as well as in Munich, Berlin and Düsseldorf, at the Salon d'Automne in Paris, and at galleries in Rotterdam.

Around 1902, he taught Divisionist techniques to Umberto Boccioni and Gino Severini. Influenced by Filippo Tommaso Marinetti, Giacomo Balla adopted the Futurism style, creating a pictorial depiction of light, movement and speed. He was a signatory of the Futurist Manifesto in 1910. When he joined the futurist movement, he was already an established artist, and was older by a decade than the other signatories of the futurist manifesto. Typical for his new style of painting is Dynamism of a Dog on a Leash (1912) and his 1914 work Abstract Speed + Sound (Italian: Velocità astratta + rumore).

He authored the "Futurist Painting: Technical Manifesto", where he argued that one should attempt to capture "the dynamic sensation itself". In 1914, he began to design Futurist furniture, as well as so-called Futurist "antineutral" clothing. Balla also began working as a sculptor, creating, in 1915, the well-known work titled Boccioni's Fist, based on 'lines of force' (Italian: Linee di forza del pugno di Boccioni).

While initially sympathetic to fascism, he changed his mind, leading him to be shunned by the Italian regime and culture which had once appreciated him, though his works were positively reevaluated after the end of the war. In the 1930s, he renounced Futurism as well as abstraction, and returned to a naturalistic style. He died on 1 March 1958, in Rome.

== Notable works ==
Giacomo Balla, 1912, Dinamismo di un Cane al Guinzaglio (Dynamism of a Dog on a Leash), Albright-Knox Art Gallery

Abstract Speed + Sound, 1914, Peggy Guggenheim Collection

Balla's 1909 painting The Street Light typifies his exploration of light, atmosphere, and motion. In this piece, Balla uses a repeating V-pattern with his brushstrokes. These strong and clear brushstrokes are used to portray the energy and brightness coming from the lamp. Additionally, Balla made use of intense colors. These intense colors, white and yellow, start at the lamp's center and transition into more cooler tones farther from the bulb of the lamp.

Balla's most famous works, such as his 1912 Dynamism of a Dog on a Leash, aim to express movement – and thus the passage of time – through the medium of painting. His approach of portraying motion is demonstrated in this work by concurrently displaying various aspects of a moving object. Balla accurately captures the motion of a dog straining to keep up with its owner by painting numerous legs, tails, and leashes. Cubism inspired this fascination with preserving a single instant in an assortment of planes. The approach also pays homage to chronophotography, which was an early method of taking pictures of many stages of movement.

Balla's 1912 The Hand of the Violinist depicts the frenetic motion of a musician playing, and draws on inspiration from Cubism and the photographic experiments of Marey and Eadweard Muybridge.

In his abstract 1912–1914 series Iridescent Interpenetration, Balla attempts to separate the experience of light from the perception of objects as such.

Abstract Speed + Sound (1913–14) is a study of speed symbolised by the automobile. Originally, it may have been part of a triptych.

== Legacy ==
In 1987, some of his artworks were exhibited at documenta 8, an exhibition of modern art and contemporary art which takes place every five years in Kassel, Germany.

He was concerned with expressing movement in his works, but unlike other leading futurists he was not interested in machines or violence with his works tending towards the witty and whimsical.

== See also ==
- List of works by Giacomo Balla
- Italian Futurism
- Parade (ballet)
