= 1986 in the United Kingdom =

Events from the year 1986 in the United Kingdom. It is particularly noted for the "Big Bang" deregulation of the financial markets.

== Incumbents ==
- Monarch – Elizabeth II
- Prime Minister – Margaret Thatcher (Conservative)

== Events ==
=== January ===
- January – The Vauxhall Belmont compact saloon goes on sale, giving buyers a traditional saloon alternative to the Astra hatchback and estate models. The car would remain in production until September 1991.
- 9 January – Michael Heseltine resigns as Defence Secretary over the Westland affair.
- 12 January – The game show Catchphrase begins on ITV hosted by Roy Walker along with the computer generated character Mr. Chips. It concludes in 2002, but is revived in 2013.
- 14 January – The Salafi jihadist group al-Muhajiroun begins to operate in the UK.
- 20 January – The United Kingdom and France announce plans to construct the Channel Tunnel, which they hope to open by the early-1990s.
- 24 January – Leon Brittan resigns as Trade and Industry Secretary over the Westland affair.
- 31 January – Unemployment for this month has increased to 3,204,900 – a postwar high which accounts for 14.4% of the workforce.

=== February ===
- February
  - Heavy snow and sub-zero temperatures affect most of Britain during the month.
  - The British-built Peugeot 309 goes on sale in Britain, four months after its continental launch. It is built at the former Rootes/Chrysler factory at Ryton, near Coventry which is also set to produce a larger Peugeot saloon model from next year.
- 6 February – The UK Government scraps plans to sell Austin Rover to Ford.
- 12 February – The Franco-British Channel Fixed Link Treaty is signed at Canterbury as the Channel Tunnel plans move forward.
- 15 February – In the Wapping dispute, fifty-eight people are arrested by police at a demonstration.
- 17 February – The UK signs the Single European Act.

=== March ===
- March – Ford launches a new generation of its big-selling Escort and Orion ranges.
- 4 March – The national tabloid newspaper Today launches from Wapping. It pioneers the use of computer photo typesetting and full-colour offset printing at a time when British national newspapers are still using Linotype machines and letterpress.
- 5 March – The High Court disqualifies and fines 81 Labour councillors for failing to set a rate.
- 13 March – The Sun newspaper alleges that comedian Freddie Starr ate a live hamster.
- 18 March – Inheritance tax replaces Capital Transfer Tax.
- 19 March – Buckingham Palace announces the engagement of Prince Andrew to Sarah Ferguson; they will be married later this year.
- 23 March – Chelsea are the first winners of the Football League's new Full Members' Cup, beating Manchester City 5–4 in the final at Wembley, although Manchester City clawed the deficit to a single goal in the last five minutes after being 5–1 down.
- 29 March – The first high-speed catamaran ferry is introduced into service in the British Isles, Our Lady Patricia on Sealink British Ferries' Portsmouth–Ryde passage.
- 31 March
  - The Greater London Council is abolished, as are the metropolitan county councils of West Midlands, Greater Manchester, Merseyside, Tyne and Wear, West Yorkshire and South Yorkshire.
  - A fire causes extensive damage at Hampton Court Palace in Surrey.
  - The Haig Pit, Whitehaven, Cumbria closes.

=== April ===
- April – Hanson Trust concludes its takeover of the Imperial Group for £2.5 billion.
- 1 April
  - The extension of London Underground's Piccadilly line to Heathrow Terminal 4 is opened by the Prince and Princess of Wales (Charles and Diana). Trains do not stop at the station until 12 April.
  - Establishment of National Museums and Galleries on Merseyside group of institutions, funded through national government.
- 7 April – Clive Sinclair sells rights to ZX Spectrum and other inventions to Amstrad.
- 10 April – The Fulham by-election, caused by the death of the sitting Conservative MP Martin Stevens on 10 January, is held. The seat is lost to Labour, under Nick Raynsford.
- 15 April – The Shops Bill 1986, which would have liberalised Sunday shopping, is defeated in the House of Commons on its second reading, the last time that a government bill will fall at this stage, one of only four defeats in the Commons for Mrs Thatcher and the only time an entire government bill is defeated during her tenure.
- 17 April
  - Journalist John McCarthy is kidnapped in Beirut, where three other hostages are found dead. The Revolutionary Cells (RZ) claims responsibility as revenge for the recent American bombing of Libya. McCarthy will be held for more than 5 years.
  - A treaty is signed to end the supposed Three Hundred and Thirty Five Years' War between the Netherlands and the Isles of Scilly.
- 20 April – Oxford United F.C., who joined the Football League only in 1962 and are in the First Division for the first time, win the Football League Cup with a 3–0 win over Queens Park Rangers at Wembley.
- 24 April – Wallis, Duchess of Windsor dies in her home in the Bois de Boulogne, Paris, aged 89, outliving her husband (the former King Edward VIII) by fourteen years.
- 28 April – The first phase of the MetroCentre, Europe's largest indoor shopping centre, in Gateshead, is opened. The remainder of the centre is set to open this autumn.
- 29 April – The Duchess of Windsor is buried at Frogmore.
- 30 April – Rioting erupts overnight in prisons across Britain. Dozens of prisoners escape, while prisoners at Stafford Prison set the prison canteen alight by smashing windows and dumping a burning mattress onto the roof. The worst disturbances come at Northeye Prison in Sussex, where a 70-strong mob of prisoners takes over the jail and sets fire to the canteen, hospital wing and sports hall.

=== May ===
- May – The last Talbot badged passenger cars are built in Britain and France by Peugeot who will continue making their own cars at the former Rootes Group plant near Coventry and the former Simca production facilities in France. Peugeot is to continue the Talbot brand for commercial vehicles and production of the Horizon range will continue in Spain and Finland until next year.
- 5 May – Liverpool win the Football League First Division title for a record 16th time after winning 1–0 at Chelsea. Kenny Dalglish, in his first season as the club's player-manager, scores the goal which gives Liverpool the title.
- 8 May
  - Labour makes large gains in local council elections, collecting 37% of the votes nationally compared to the Conservatives on 34% and the Alliance on 26%. These are the first national elections to be held since the recent abolition of the metropolitan councils.
  - By-elections are held in West Derbyshire and Ryedale, caused by the resignation of Matthew Parris and the death of John Spence, both Conservative MPs, respectively. The Conservatives hold West Derbyshire under Patrick McLoughlin but lose Ryedale to the Liberals.
  - Former Labour MP and life peer Manny Shinwell, Baron Shinwell dies at the age of 101, making him the second longest-lived British MP until 2008.
- 10 May – The first all-Merseyside FA Cup final ends in a 3–1 win for Liverpool over Everton, who become only the third team this century to win the double, having already secured the Football League First Division title.
- 20 May – The Marriage (Prohibited Degrees of Relationship) Act revises the prohibited degree of kinship for marriage.
- 21 May – The Harrison Birtwistle opera The Mask of Orpheus premieres in London.

=== June ===
- 10 June – Patrick Joseph Magee is found guilty of the 1984 Brighton hotel bombing and sentenced to life imprisonment.
- 12 June
  - Derek Hatton, leader of Liverpool council, is expelled from the Labour Party for belonging to the entryist Militant group.
  - Austin Rover is renamed the Rover Group four years after the name change from British Leyland.
- 14 June – The Queen rides to Trooping the Colour on horseback for the last time.
- 23 June – Patrick Magee is jailed for life for the 1984 Brighton hotel bombing as well as other IRA bombings.
- 24 June – Ian Paisley's Democratic Unionist Party stage protest at dissolution of Northern Ireland Assembly.
- 29 June
  - Richard Branson beats the speed record for a transatlantic crossing by boat in Virgin Atlantic Challenger II but is denied the Blue Riband award.
  - The Association football World Cup ends in Mexico with Argentina as winners and West Germany runners-up, but England's Gary Lineker wins the Golden Boot, having finished as the competition's leading scorer with six goals. Lineker, who has been at Everton for the last year and is the First Division's top scorer, is reported to be on the verge of a transfer to FC Barcelona of Spain.

=== July ===
- July – Nissan begins production of the Bluebird at its landmark factory near Sunderland.
- 1 July – Gary Lineker becomes the most expensive British footballer ever in a £2.75 million move from Everton to FC Barcelona.
- 2 July – 24 hours after Gary Lineker's transfer, Ian Rush sets a new transfer record for a British footballer when he agrees a £3.2 million move from Liverpool to Juventus of Italy, but is loaned back to Liverpool for a season and will not play his first game for Juventus until at least August 1987.
- 4 July – A policeman is cleared of the manslaughter of five-year-old John Shorthouse, who was killed in an armed raid on a house in Birmingham in August last year.
- 10 July – Austin Rover launches its new Honda-based Rover 800 executive car, which replaces the decade-old Rover SD1 and is part of a joint venture with Japanese carmaker Honda. The car will also be sold in the United States under the Sterling marque. The Honda version will be badged as the Honda Legend.
- 12 July – Rioting breaks out at Portadown in Northern Ireland between Protestants and Catholics.
- 17 July
  - It is announced that unemployment rose to 3,220,400 in June. It has now exceeded 3 million for nearly five years.
  - The Newcastle-under-Lyme by-election, caused by the resignation of the sitting Labour MP John Golding on 24 June, is held. His wife Llin Golding is elected the new Labour MP.
- 23 July – Prince Andrew, Duke of York, marries Sarah Ferguson at Westminster Abbey in London.
- 24 July–2 August – The Commonwealth Games are held in Edinburgh.
- 25 July
  - Building Societies Act allows building societies to offer the same personal finance services as banks. The Bank of England withdraws its guidance on mortgage loans.
  - Social Security Act introduces Family Credit, a tax credit for low-paid workers with children.
- 26 July – A passenger train collides with a van in the Lockington rail accident in East Yorkshire; nine people are killed, eight on the train and one in the van.
- 28 July – Estate agent Suzy Lamplugh vanishes after a viewing in London. She is declared legally dead in 1994, but what happened will remain unknown, her body will still not have been found and no-one will have been formally charged with her murder.
- 30 July – A MORI poll shows that Labour are now nine points ahead of the Conservatives with 41% of the vote, with Liberal/SDP Alliance support now at 25%.

=== August ===
- 4 August – Mathematician Simon Donaldson is awarded a Fields Medal.
- 8 August – Rival gangs of Manchester United and West Ham United fans clash on a Sealink ferry bound for Amsterdam where the two clubs are playing pre-season friendlies. The UEFA ban on English clubs in European competitions is continuing for a second season, and there are now fears that English clubs may not even be able to play friendlies overseas.
- 13 August – The Eurotunnel Group is formed to operate the Channel Tunnel.
- 15 August – The latest MORI poll shows that the Conservatives have eliminated Labour's nine-point lead and drawn level with them by gaining 37% in the latest opinion poll, in the space of just over two weeks.
- 16 August – Figures released by the government reveal that a record of nearly 3,100,000 people claimed Unemployment Benefit last month, although the official total of unemployed people in Britain is still short of the record of nearly 3,300,000 which was set two years ago.
- 19 August – The privatisation of the National Bus Company begins with the first sale of a bus operating subsidiary, Devon General, in a management buyout.
- 22 August – John Stalker, deputy chief constable of Greater Manchester police, is cleared of misconduct over allegations of associating with criminals.
- 24–25 August – The inaugural Birmingham Superprix, the first street race to be held in mainland Britain, takes place in Birmingham city centre. It will run annually on August Bank Holiday weekend until 1990.
- 25 August – Economists warn that a global recession is imminent, barely five years after the previous recession.
- 29 August
  - Britain's oldest twins, May and Marjorie Chavasse, celebrate their one-hundredth birthday.
  - Highest national average 24-hour total rainfall until 2020.
- c. August – The one-millionth council house in the United Kingdom is sold to its tenants in Scotland, seven years after the Right To Buy scheme was launched.

=== September ===
- September – GCSE examination courses replace both GCE 'O' Level and CSE courses for 14-year-olds.
- 6 September – First episode of medical drama serial Casualty airs on BBC One. It will still be running on television almost forty years later.
- 8 September – Margaret Thatcher officially opens the first phase of the Nissan car factory at Sunderland, which has been in use for two months. It is the first car factory to be built in Europe by a Japanese carmaker.
- 13 September – Motorcyclist Neil Robinson, 24, dies after his motorcycle crashes on the Oliver's Mount racing circuit in Scarborough during a practice session.
- 14 September – Fears of another recession in Britain are eased by economists at Liverpool University predicting 3.1% economic growth next year.
- 18 September – It is announced that unemployment rose to 3,280,106 in July.
- 19 September – One man, a train driver, is killed and 79 people are injured in the Colwich railway accident.
- 24 September – The flotation of the Trustee Savings Banks attracts a record of more than 4 million applications for shares.

=== October ===
- 7 October – The first edition of The Independent national morning newspaper is published in London.
- 9 October
  - "Babes in the Wood" murders: two girls, Nicola Fellows (aged nine) and Karen Hadaway (aged 10), are reported missing in Moulsecoomb, Brighton.
  - Musical The Phantom of the Opera opens at Her Majesty's Theatre in London.
- 10 October – "Babes in the Wood" murders: two bodies found in Wild Park, Brighton, are identified as those of the two girls reported missing yesterday and a murder investigation is launched.
- 12 October – Elizabeth II and Prince Philip, Duke of Edinburgh visit the People's Republic of China, the first ever visit to the country by a British monarch.
- 14 October – The MetroCentre, a shopping complex built on the Tyneside Enterprise Zone, is opened. It is similar in concept to the Merry Hill Shopping Centre that is being developed near Dudley in the West Midlands. The MetroCentre is officially the largest shopping complex in Europe. Among the MetroCentre's tenants is Marks & Spencer, whose department store there is its first out of town outlet.
- 24 October – The UK breaks off diplomatic relations with Syria over links to the Hindawi affair.
- 26 October
  - Bus deregulation begins in the United Kingdom, except Greater London and Northern Ireland.
  - Jeffrey Archer resigns as Deputy Chairman of the Conservative Party over allegations concerning prostitutes.
- 27 October
  - "Big Bang Day": London Stock Exchange is computerised, and opens to foreign companies.
  - BBC1 starts a full daytime television service, including the UK launch of Australian soap Neighbours, more than a year after debuting in its native country.
- 28 October – Jeremy Bamber is found guilty of the 1985 "White House Farm murders" of his parents, sister and twin nephews in Essex, and is sentenced to life imprisonment with a recommended minimum of 25 years and as of 2025 is still in prison.
- 29 October – Margaret Thatcher opens the completed M25 London Orbital Motorway, the first section of which opened in 1975. It covers a distance of 122 miles and features 31 junctions, although there are no service stations yet.
- 30 October – Children and young people's telephone counselling charity Childline begins taking calls.

=== November ===
- November
  - First UNESCO World Heritage Sites in the U.K. designated: Giant's Causeway and the Causeway Coast (Northern Ireland); Durham Castle and Cathedral; Ironbridge Gorge; Studley Royal Park (including the ruins of Fountains Abbey); Stonehenge, Avebury and Associated Sites; and Castles and Town Walls of King Edward in Gwynedd (Wales).
  - Launch of the second generation Vauxhall Carlton, largest model in the Vauxhall range. It will be sold as the Opel Omega on the continent, and all European versions of the car will be built in West Germany.
- 3 November – The Conservatives top a MORI poll for the first time this year, coming one point ahead of Labour with 40% of the vote. Liberal/SDP Alliance support has slumped to 18%.
- 6 November
  - 45 oil platform workers and flight crew are killed in the 1986 British International Helicopters Chinook crash.
  - Chancellor Nigel Lawson announces a £4.6 billion rise in public spending.
  - Alex Ferguson is appointed manager of Manchester United football club following the dismissal of Ron Atkinson after more than five years in charge. United won two FA Cups under the management of Atkinson but have not won the league title since 1967 and are now second from bottom in the Football League First Division. Ferguson will hold the post for 26 years.
- 7 November
  - Sir James Goldsmith's £5 billion bid for the Goodyear Tire and Rubber Company is rejected.
  - Education (No. 2) Act 1986 requires increased representation of parents in the governance of schools, abolishes school corporal punishment in the state sector, and gives universities a duty to protect freedom of speech.
- 13 November
  - It is announced that unemployment fell by 96,000 in October.
  - The Knowsley North by-election, caused by the departure of the sitting Labour MP Robert Kilroy-Silk on 1 October, is held. The seat is held by Labour under George Howarth.
- 13 November – Michael Lush falls to his death on the set of The Late, Late Breakfast Show, leading to the show's cancellation.
- 18 November – Ian Brady and Myra Hindley, who are both still in prison 20 years after their Moors Murders convictions, confess to the murders of two missing children – Pauline Reade, who vanished in July 1963 at the age of 16, and Keith Bennett, who was last seen in June 1964 at the age of 12.
- 20 November – Greater Manchester Police begin their search for the two newly identified Moors Murders victims.
- 21 November – The Government launches a £20 million campaign to warn members of the public about the dangers of AIDS.

=== December ===
- December – The first case of bovine spongiform encephalopathy is diagnosed in British cattle.
- 1 December – The government launches an inquiry into financial irregularities at Guinness.
- 3 December – 4 million people apply for shares in British Gas in anticipation of flotation next week.
- 4 December – 20-year-old roofer Russell Bishop is charged with the "Babes in the Wood" murders in Brighton two months ago but will not be convicted until a second trial in 2018.
- 8 December – British Gas shares are floated on the Stock Exchange. The initial public offering of 135p per share values the company at £9 billion, the highest equity offering ever at this time.
- 17 December – The world's first heart, lung and liver transplant is carried out at Papworth Hospital in Cambridgeshire.
- 18 December – It is announced that unemployment fell to a four-year low of less than 3,100,000 in November. On 15 January 1987 it is announced that unemployment has fallen in December 1986 for the fifth month in succession.
- 22 December – David Penhaligon, a leading Liberal Party MP, dies in a car crash near Truro in his Cornwall constituency at the age of 42.
- 25 December – The highest audience of all time for a British television drama is attracted by the Christmas Day episode of soap opera EastEnders, in which Den Watts (Leslie Grantham) serves the divorce papers on his wife Angie (Anita Dobson) after discovering that she had feigned a terminal illness to try to stop him from leaving her in an episode aired in October this year. More than 30 million viewers tune in for the episode of the TV series which first went on air in February 1985.
- 29 December – Harold Macmillan, Earl of Stockton and former Prime Minister, dies at his home, Birch Grove in East Sussex, aged 92, the oldest former Prime Minister until 2005.

=== Undated ===
- Inflation reaches a 19-year low of 3.4%.

== Publications ==
- Janet and Allan Ahlberg's children's book The Jolly Postman.
- Kingsley Amis's novel The Old Devils.
- Jeffrey Archer's novel A Matter of Honour.
- Iain Banks' novel The Bridge.
- John le Carré's novel A Perfect Spy.
- Richard Dawkins' book The Blind Watchmaker.
- Brian Jacques' novel Redwall, first in the eponymous series.
- Terry Pratchett's Discworld novel The Light Fantastic.

== Births ==
=== January ===
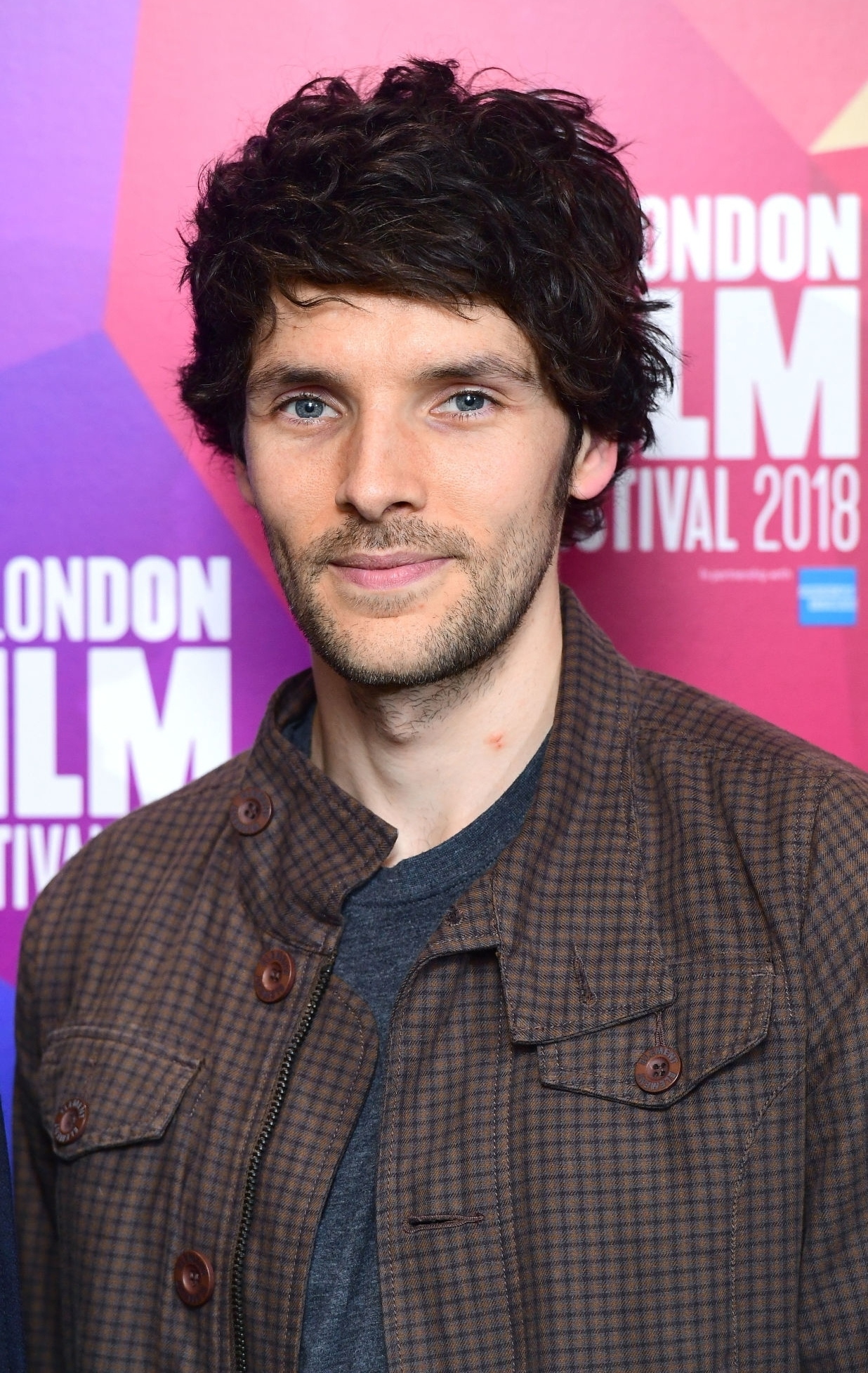
Colin Morgan

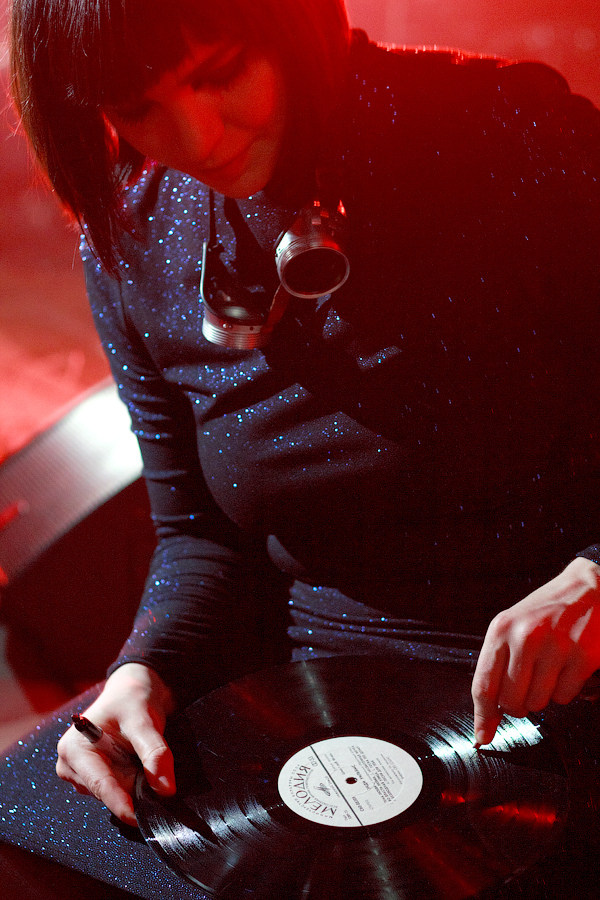
Emika

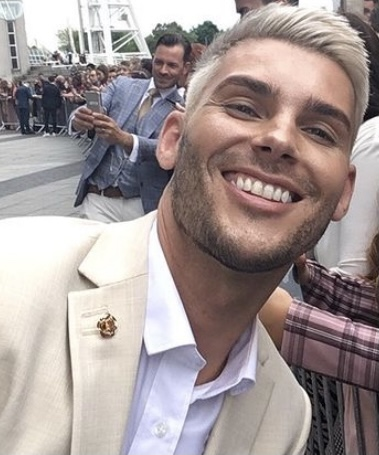
Kieron Richardson

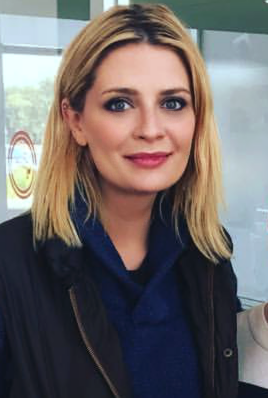
Mischa Barton

- 1 January
  - Anna Brewster, actress and model
  - James Cottriall, English-born Austrian singer and musician
  - Colin Morgan, actor
- 2 January – Rob Beckett, comedian, narrator, and presenter
- 3 January – Liam Treadwell, National Hunt jockey (d. 2020)
- 4 January
  - Russell Martin, football player and manager
  - James Milner, footballer
- 6 January – Alex Turner, musician
- 7 January – Liam Fontaine, footballer
- 8 January – Emika, electronic musician
- 9 January – Craig Davies, footballer
- 10 January – Abbey Clancy, model and television personality
- 11 January
  - Kamara Bacchus, actress and radio personality
  - Kelly Chambers, footballer
  - Liam Coleman, footballer
  - Terry Etim, mixed martial artist
  - Jackmaster, disc jockey and record producer (d. 2024)
  - Rachel Riley, television presenter
- 12 January
  - Edward Drake, Olympic skier
  - Chris Evangelou, actor and boxer
  - Kieron Richardson, actor
- 13 January – Rosalind Canter, equestrian
- 17 January
  - Nicholas D. Cooper, actor
  - Lucy Evangelista, model and pageant winner
- 18 January – John Farnworth, football freestyler, entertainer, actor, and World Record holder
- 20 January – Hannah Daniel, actress
- 22 January – Ella Edmondson, singer/songwriter
- 23 January – Anne Foy, children's television presenter
- 24 January
  - Mischa Barton, British-born American actress
  - Oliver Brennand, rugby player
  - Montell Douglas, Olympic sprinter and bobsleigher
- 26 January
  - Luke Bowen, speedway rider
  - Danny Crow, footballer
- 28 January
  - Jessica Ennis-Hill, Olympic heptathlete
  - Ashley Lilley, actress and singer
- 29 January – Mark Howard, footballer

=== February ===
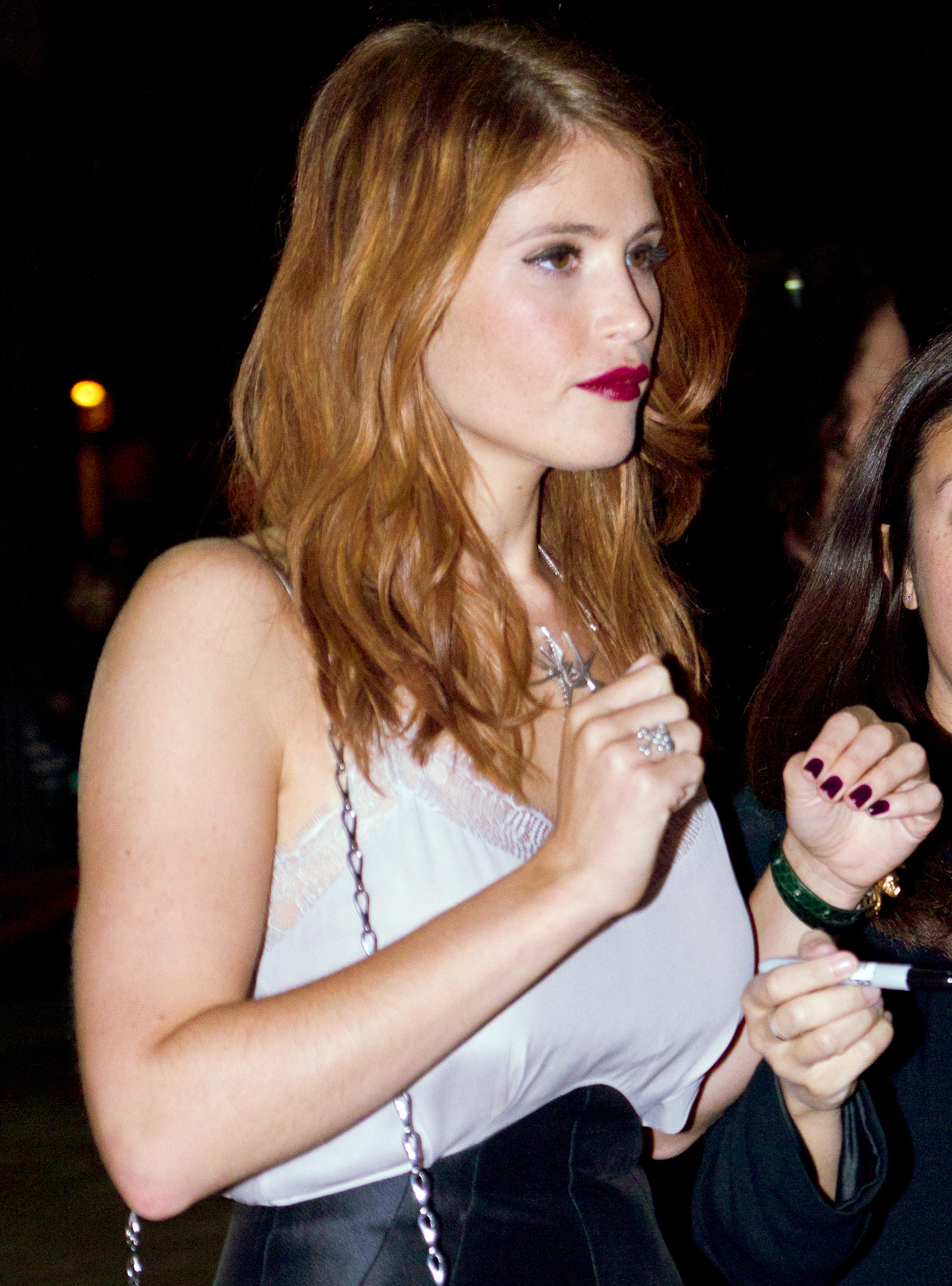
Gemma Arterton

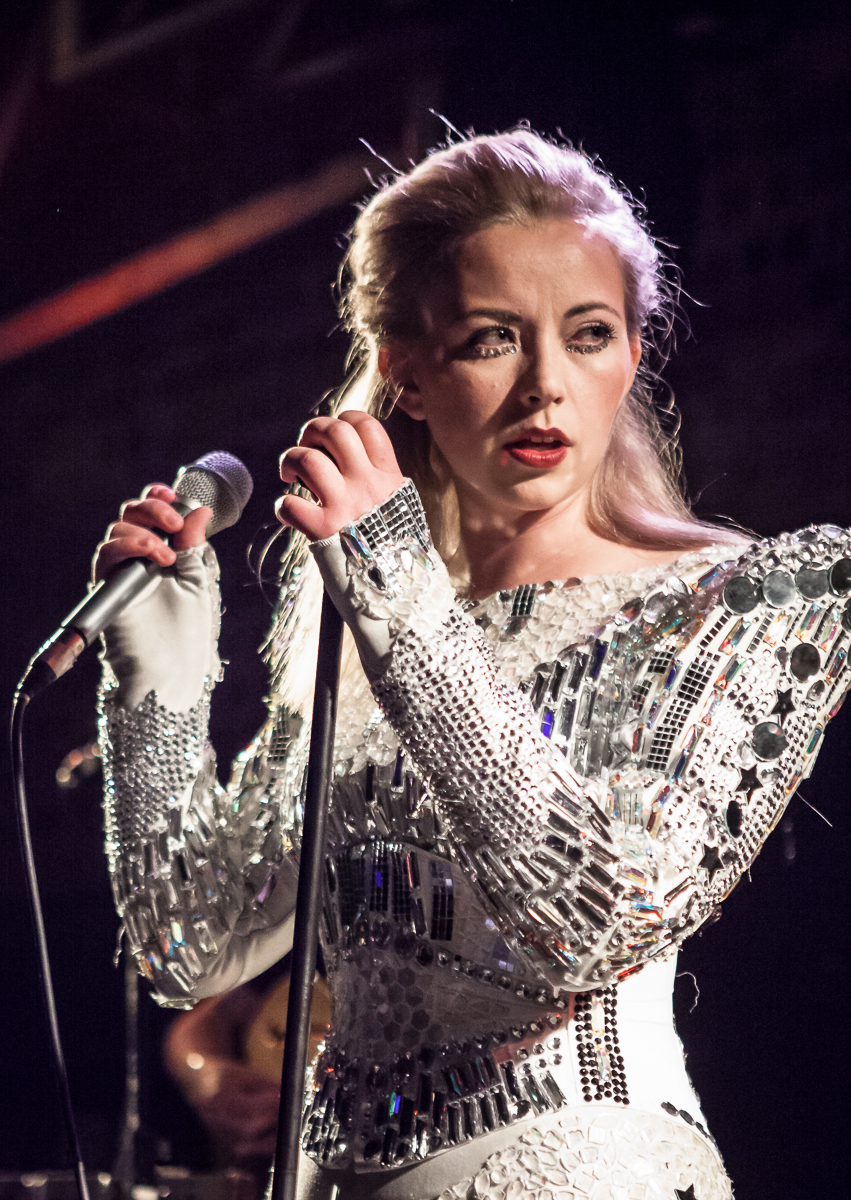
Charlotte Church

- 1 February
  - Kerry Blewett, lifeguard and canoe sprinter
  - Joe Connor, footballer
  - Tom Deacon, comedian
- 2 February – Gemma Arterton, actress
- 3 February
  - Donald Barrell, rugby player
  - James DeGale, boxer
  - David Edwards, footballer
- 4 February – Lewis Chalmers, footballer
- 5 February – Billy Sharp, footballer
- 6 February – Jon-Allan Butterworth, Paralympic cyclist
- 7 February – Ben Batt, actor
- 8 February – James Collins, rugby player
- 11 February
  - Bim Afolami, politician
  - Tom Bartram, cricketer
  - Mark Coulson, footballer
- 19 February
  - Duncan Bradshaw, cricketer
  - Ophelia Lovibond, actress
- 21 February – Charlotte Church, singer/songwriter
- 22 February – Mark Allen, snooker player
- 23 February
  - Darren Cheesman, hockey player
  - Laura Coleman, model, social media influencer, and actress
- 25 February
  - Andrew Dick, footballer
  - James and Oliver Phelps, identical twin actors
- 27 February – Adam Bartlett, footballer
- 28 February – Kingsley Ben-Adir, actor

=== March ===
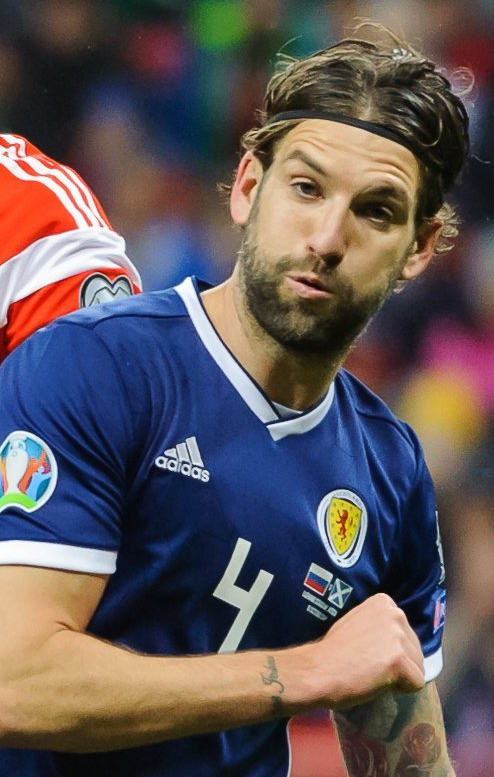
Charlie Mulgrew

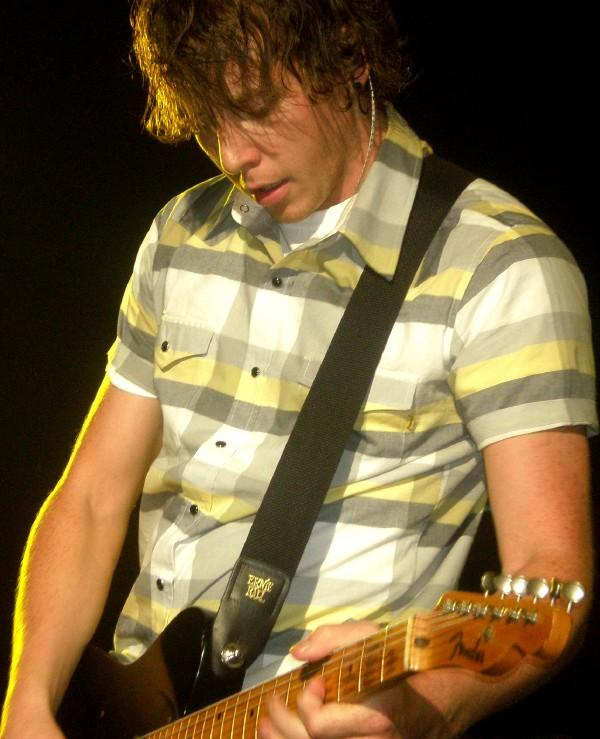
Danny Jones

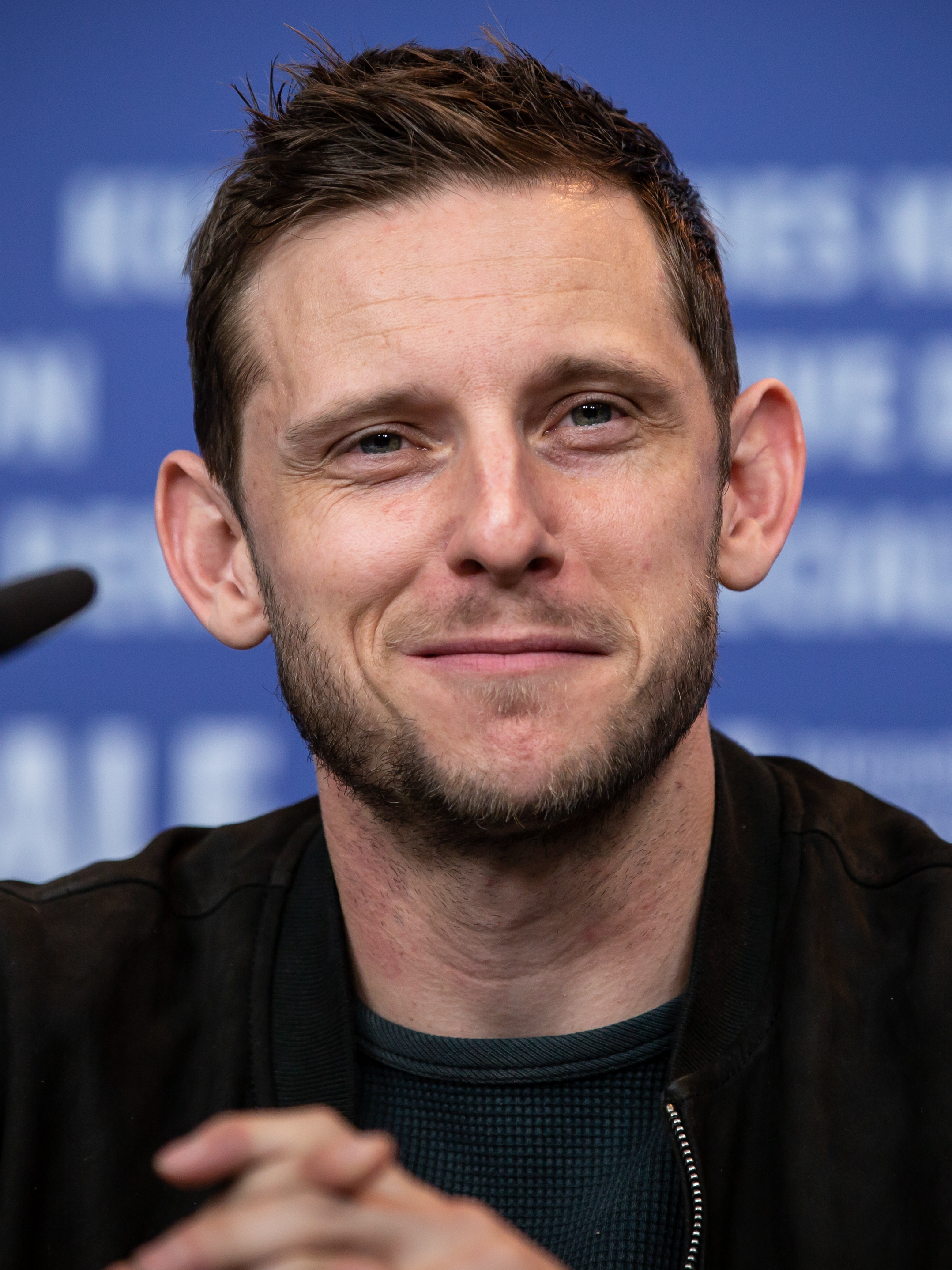
Jamie Bell

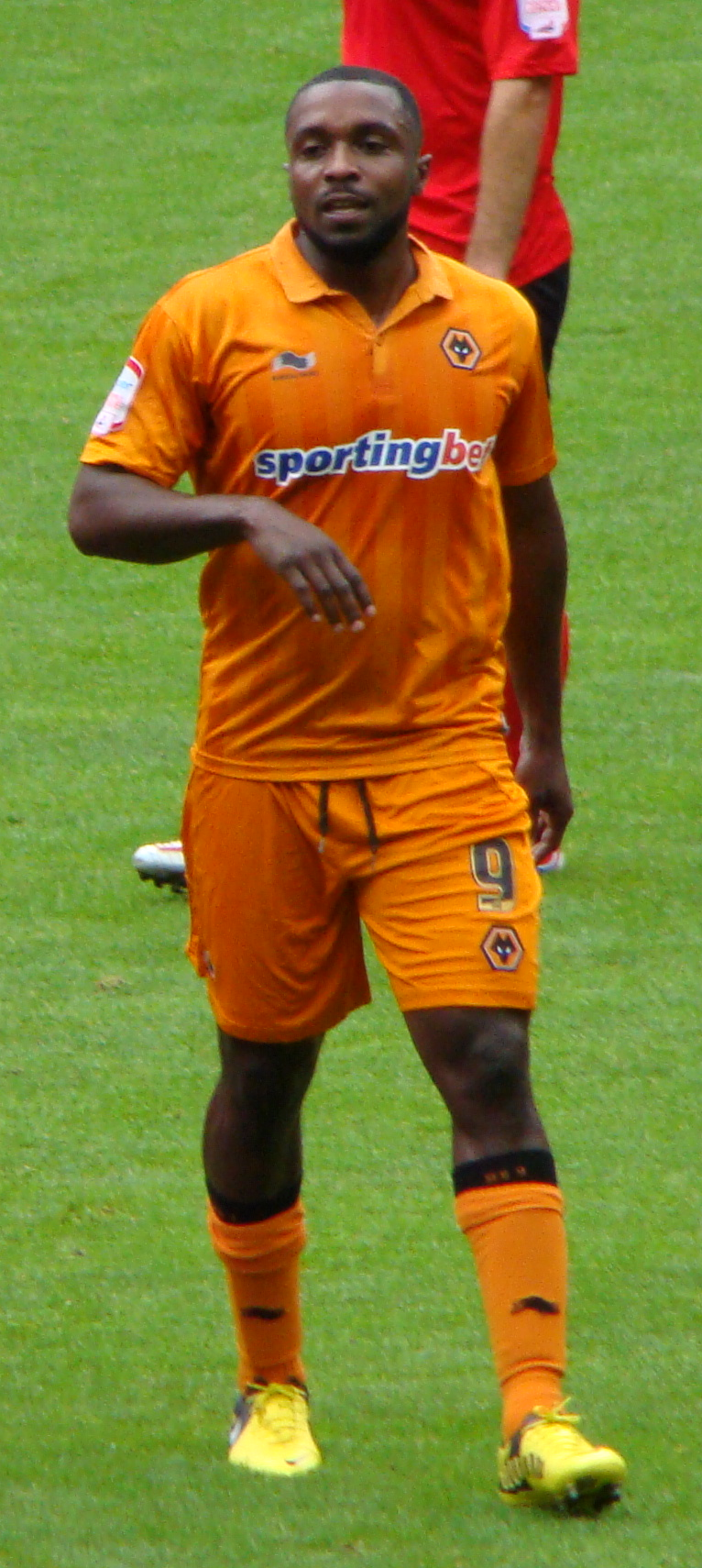
Sylvan Ebanks-Blake

- 1 March
  - Joanna Blair, javelin thrower
  - Aaron Bramwell, rugby player
  - Alec Utgoff, Ukrainian-born actor
- 2 March
  - James Ashmore, footballer
  - Jay Conroy, footballer
- 3 March
  - Iwan Brown, rugby player
  - Tom Curle, footballer
- 5 March – Matty Fryatt, footballer and coach
- 6 March
  - Danny Jones, rugby league footballer (d. 2015)
  - Charlie Mulgrew, footballer
- 7 March – Geraint Davies, rugby player
- 8 March – Emma Cousin, artist
- 11 March
  - Peter Bissell, cyclist
  - Tom Clarke, musician and frontman for The Enemy
  - Will Dobson, cricketer
- 12 March
  - Mat Bailey, footballer
  - Danny Jones, musician, singer/songwriter, vocalist and guitarist for McFly
- 13 March
  - Hannah Claydon, model
  - Kat Driscoll, Olympic trampoline gymnast
- 14 March – Jamie Bell, actor
- 16 March
  - Dave Coupland, golfer
  - Joe Denly, cricketer
- 17 March – Will Chudley, rugby player
- 19 March – Kane Ashcroft, footballer (d. 2015)
- 20 March – Kirsty Blackman, politician
- 21 March
  - Samantha Bowen, Iraqi War veteran and Paralympic sitting volleyball player
  - Sam Nixon, singer and TV presenter
- 22 March
  - Tom Cheeseman, footballer
  - Eddie Dennis, wrestler
- 24 March
  - Tom Davies, rugby player
- 25 March
  - Ashleigh Ball, hockey player
  - Bob Davidson, footballer
- 26 March – Luc Bernard, video game designer and artist
- 28 March
  - Jay Curtis, television & radio broadcaster and actor
  - Bolu Fagborun, Nigerian-born rugby player
- 29 March – Sylvan Ebanks-Blake, footballer
- 31 March
  - Scott Baker, darts player
  - Matty Collins, footballer

=== April ===
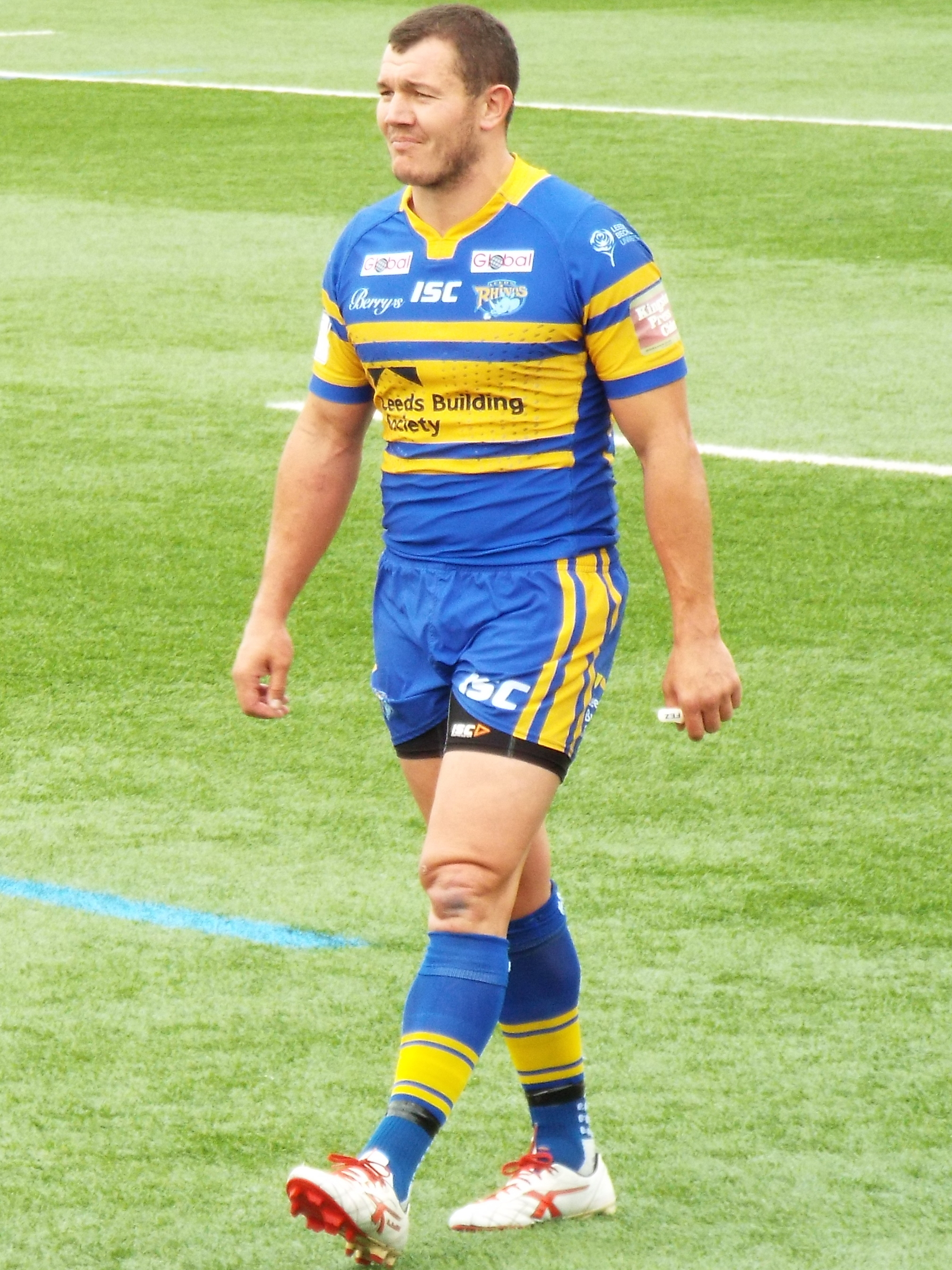
Brett Ferres

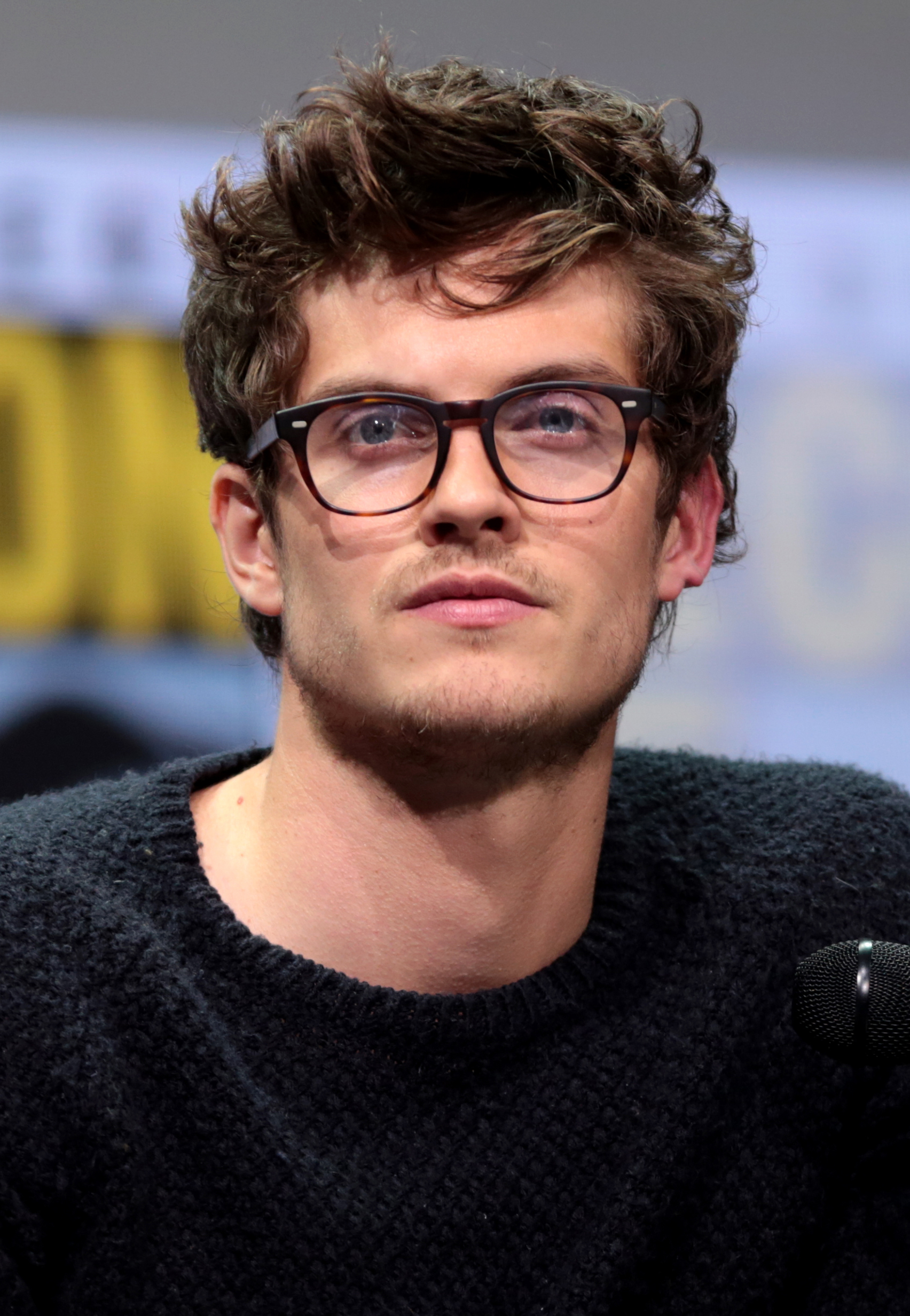
Daniel Sharman

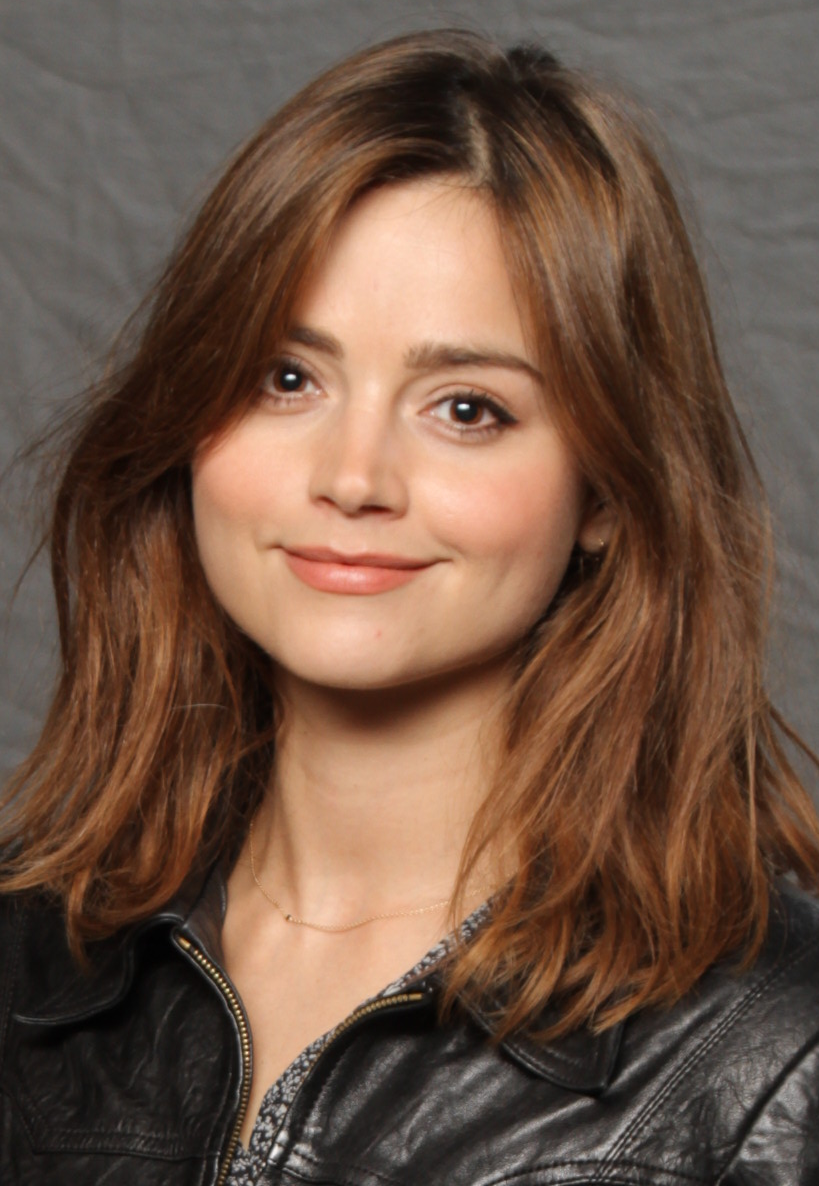
Jenna Coleman

- 1 April – Fardad Farahzad, Iranian-born journalist
- 3 April – Coleen Rooney, media personality
- 6 April – David Avery, actor
- 7 April – Andi Fraggs, singer/songwriter and music producer
- 8 April – Liam Scarlett, choreographer (d. 2021)
- 9 April
  - Doctor P, dubstep producer and DJ
  - Leilani Franco, contortionist
- 10 April
  - Sam Attwater, actor
  - Adam Connolly, footballer
  - Martin Drury, footballer and coach
- 12 April – Nick Crumpton, zoologist and children's author
- 13 April – Michael Bingham, Olympic track-and-field athlete
- 14 April – Matt Derbyshire, footballer
- 15 April
  - Chris Dagnall, footballer
  - Tom Heaton, footballer
- 16 April
  - Darren Campbell, footballer
  - Paul Di Resta, racing driver
- 17 April – Brett Ferres, rugby player
- 18 April
  - Jordan Brookes, comedian
  - Gavin Cadwallader, footballer
  - James Dabill, motorcycle trials rider
  - Gareth Evans, Olympic weightlifter
- 20 April – Phil Clifton, television and radio presenter
- 21 April – Blair Cowan, rugby player
- 22 April – Stuart Anderson, footballer
- 23 April – Stuart Fleetwood, footballer
- 25 April – Daniel Sharman, actor
- 27 April – Jenna Coleman, actress
- 29 April – Donna Etiebet, rower
- 30 April – Michael Collins, footballer

=== May ===
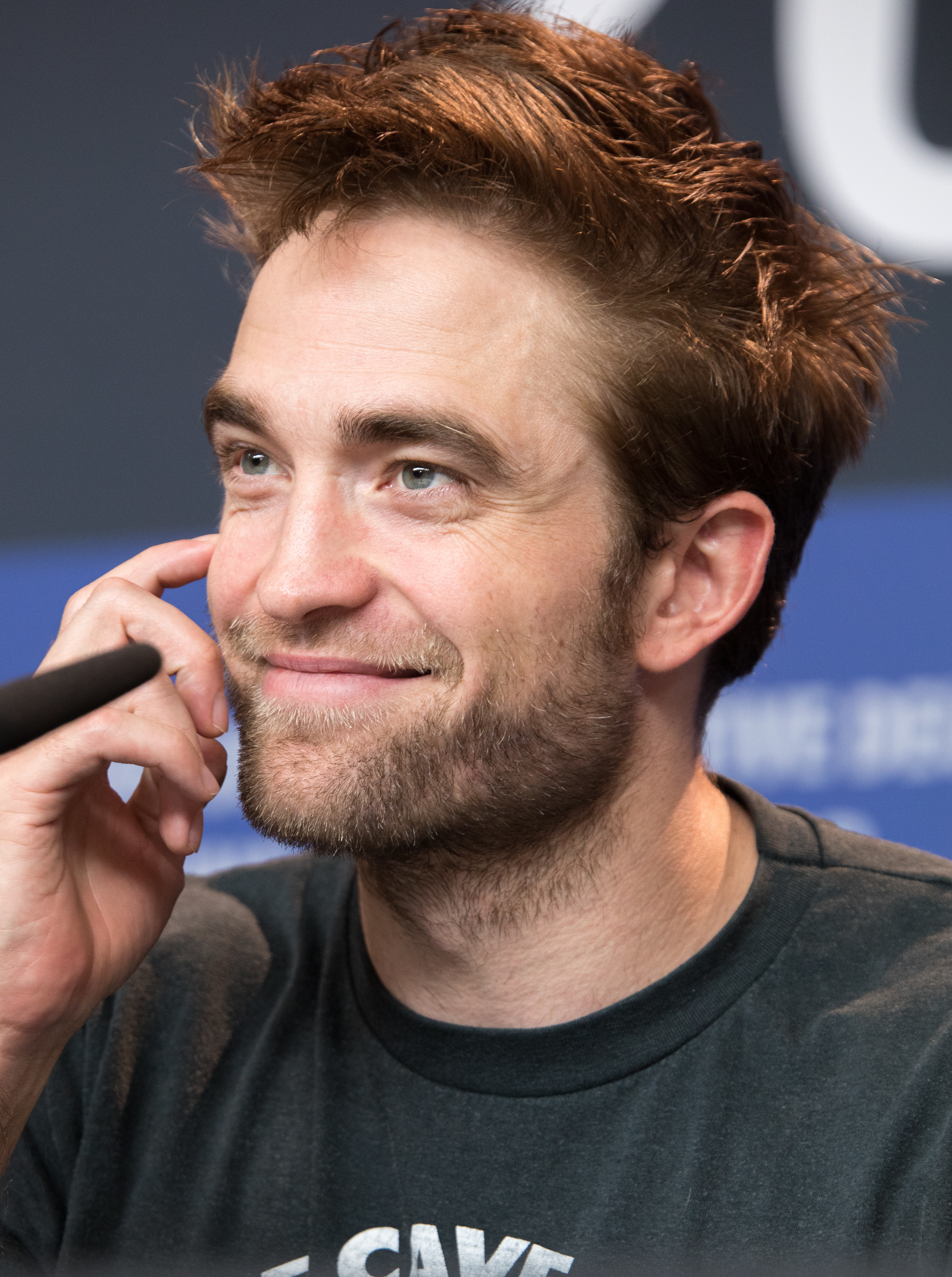
Robert Pattinson

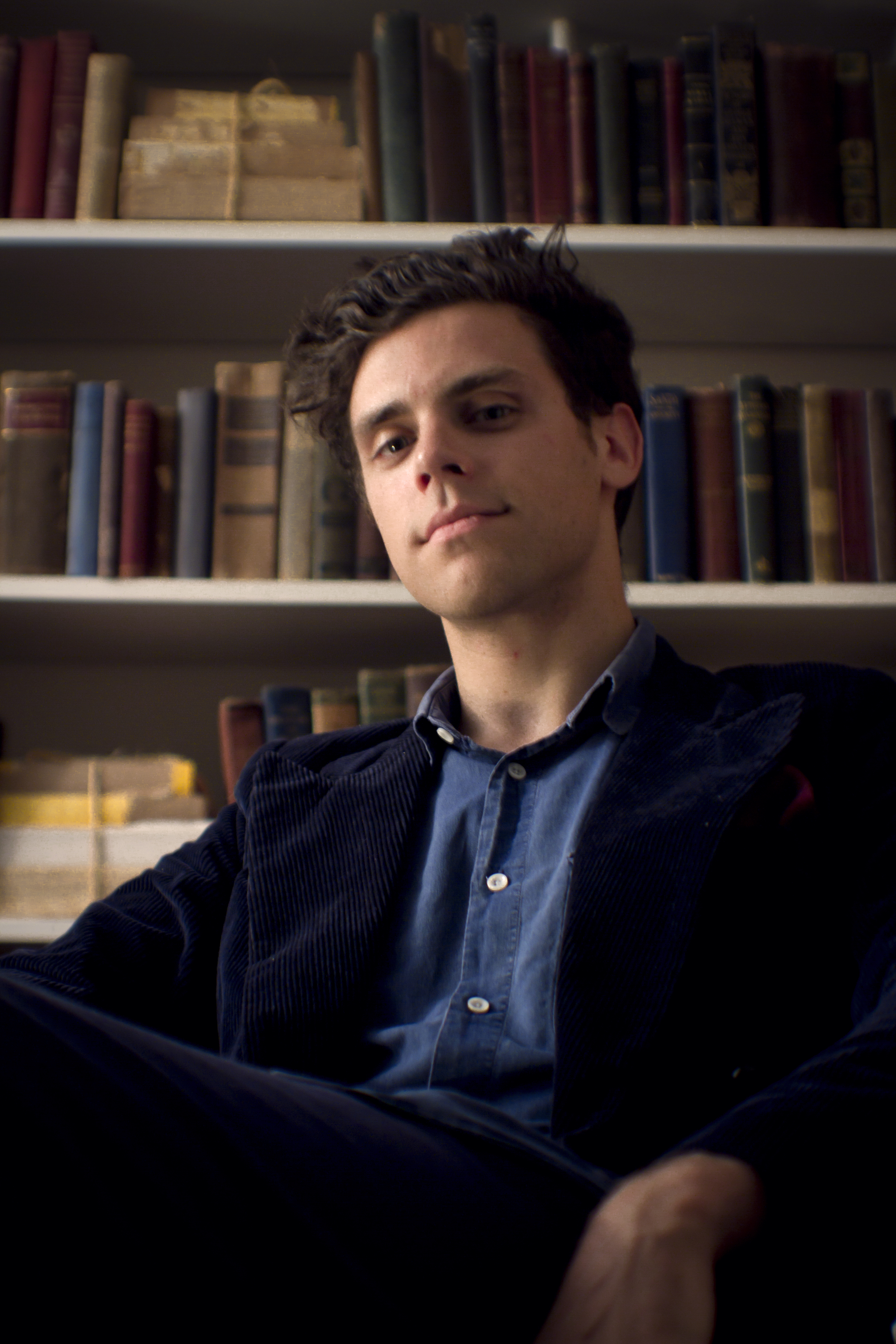
Charlie Fink

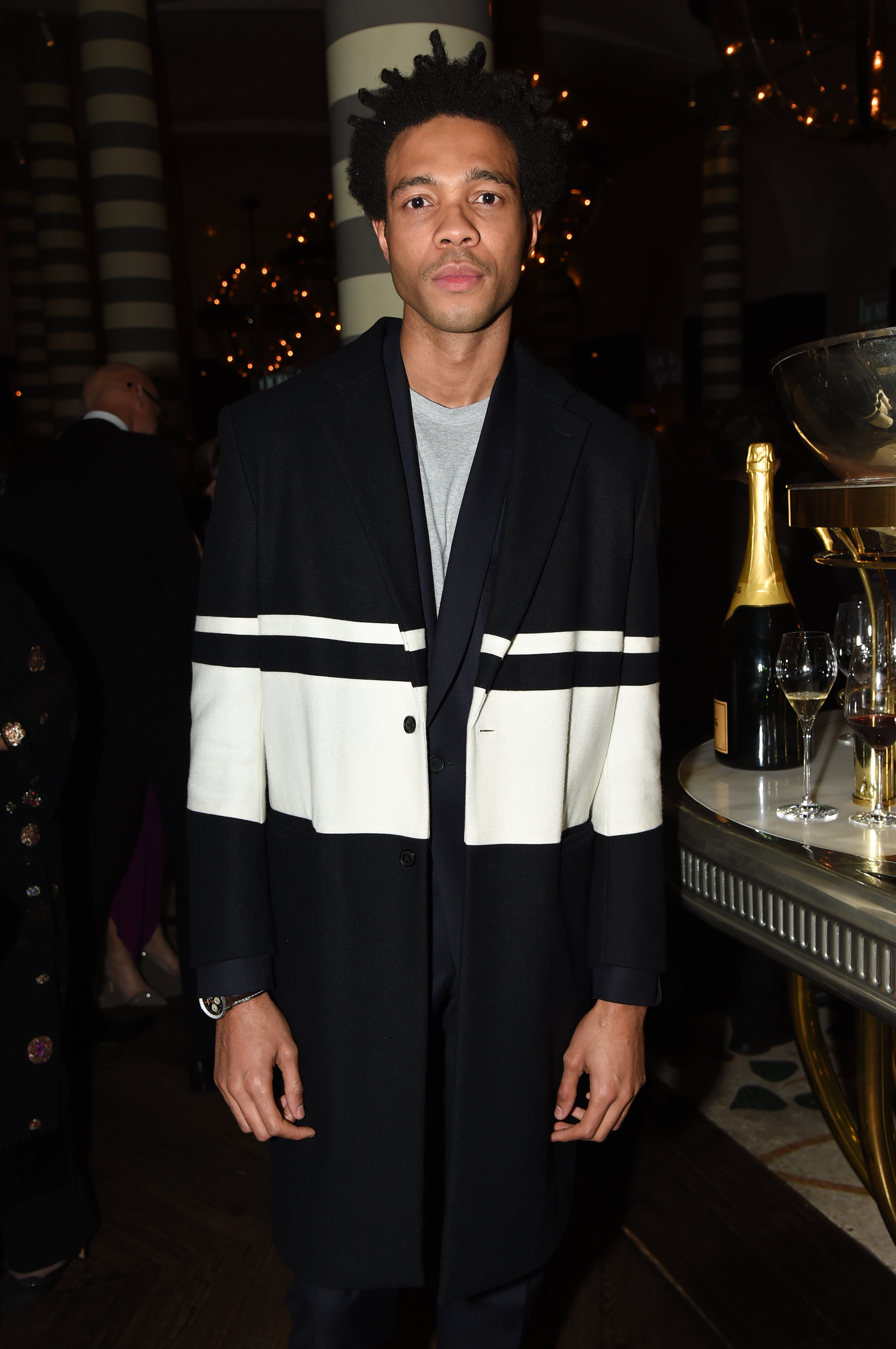
Charlie Casely-Hayford

- 3 May
  - Kell Brook, boxer
  - Poppy Delevingne, model
  - Jon-Lewis Dickinson, boxer
- 5 May – Brett Domino, musician and comedian
- 6 May – David Buchanan, footballer
- 7 May – Jamie Day, footballer
- 10 May – Liam Davies, rugby player
- 11 May – Marc Fitzpatrick, footballer
- 12 May – Luke Douglas, Australian-born rugby player
- 13 May
  - Mark Bott, cricketer
  - Robert Pattinson, actor
- 14 May – Richard Huckle, convicted sex offender (d. 2019)
- 15 May – Tom Champion, footballer
- 16 May – Charlie Fink, songwriter, producer and filmmaker
- 17 May – Jodie Taylor, footballer
- 19 May – Christian Begg, cricketer
- 20 May
  - Dexter Blackstock, footballer
  - Robert Emms, actor
- 23 May – Matthew Crampton, cyclist
- 24 May – Charlie Casely-Hayford, fashion designer
- 25 May – Lauren Crace, actress and radio presenter
- 26 May
  - Fern Brady, comedian and writer
  - James Cockle, speedway rider
  - Martin Paul Eve, academic, writer, and disability rights campaigner
- 27 May – Conor Cummins, motorcycle racer
- 28 May – Laura Dockrill, author and performance poet
- 29 May
  - Anthony Barry, footballer
  - Danny Fox, footballer
- 31 May – Chris Brooker, rugby player

=== June ===
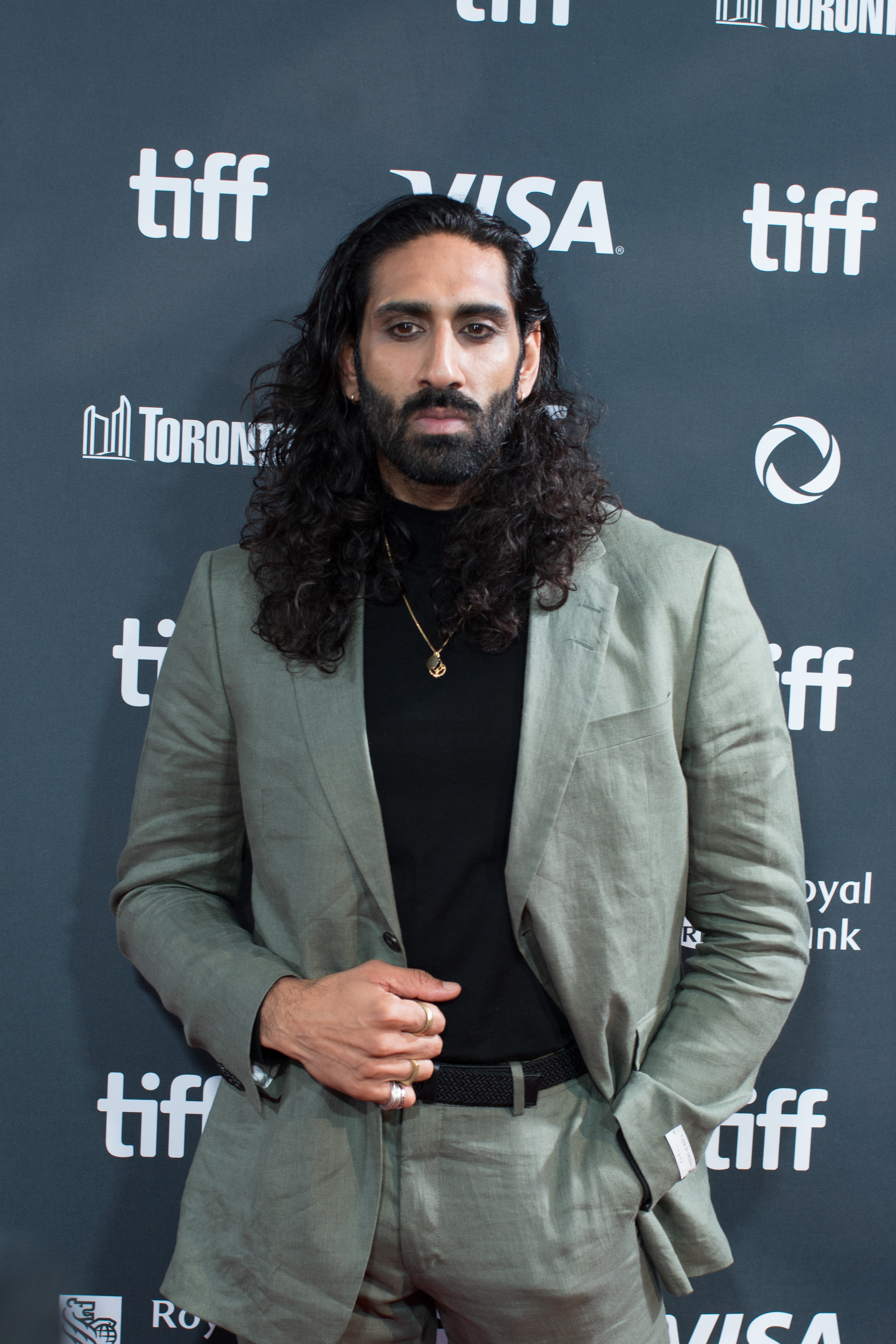
Amar Chadha-Patel

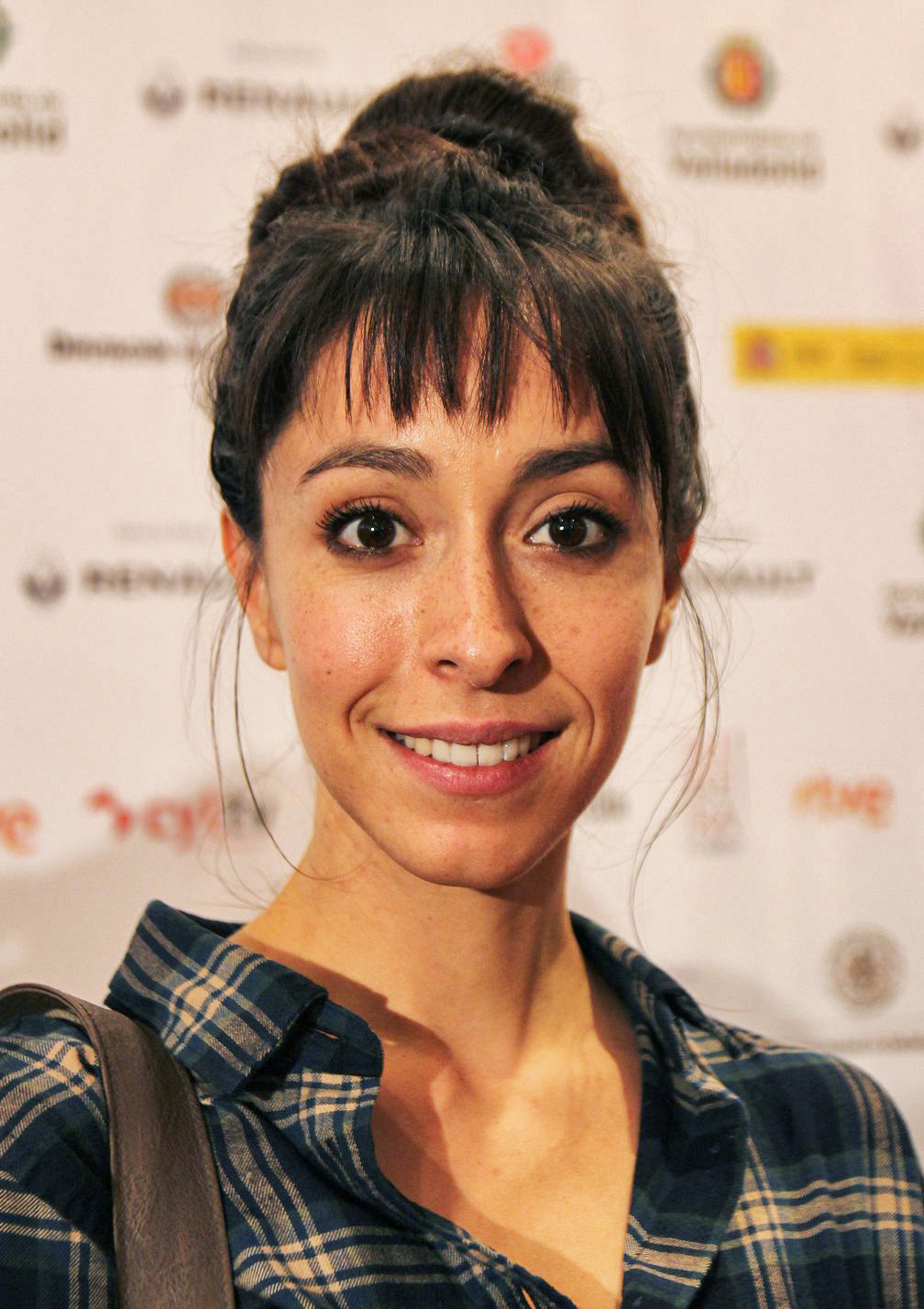
Oona Chaplin

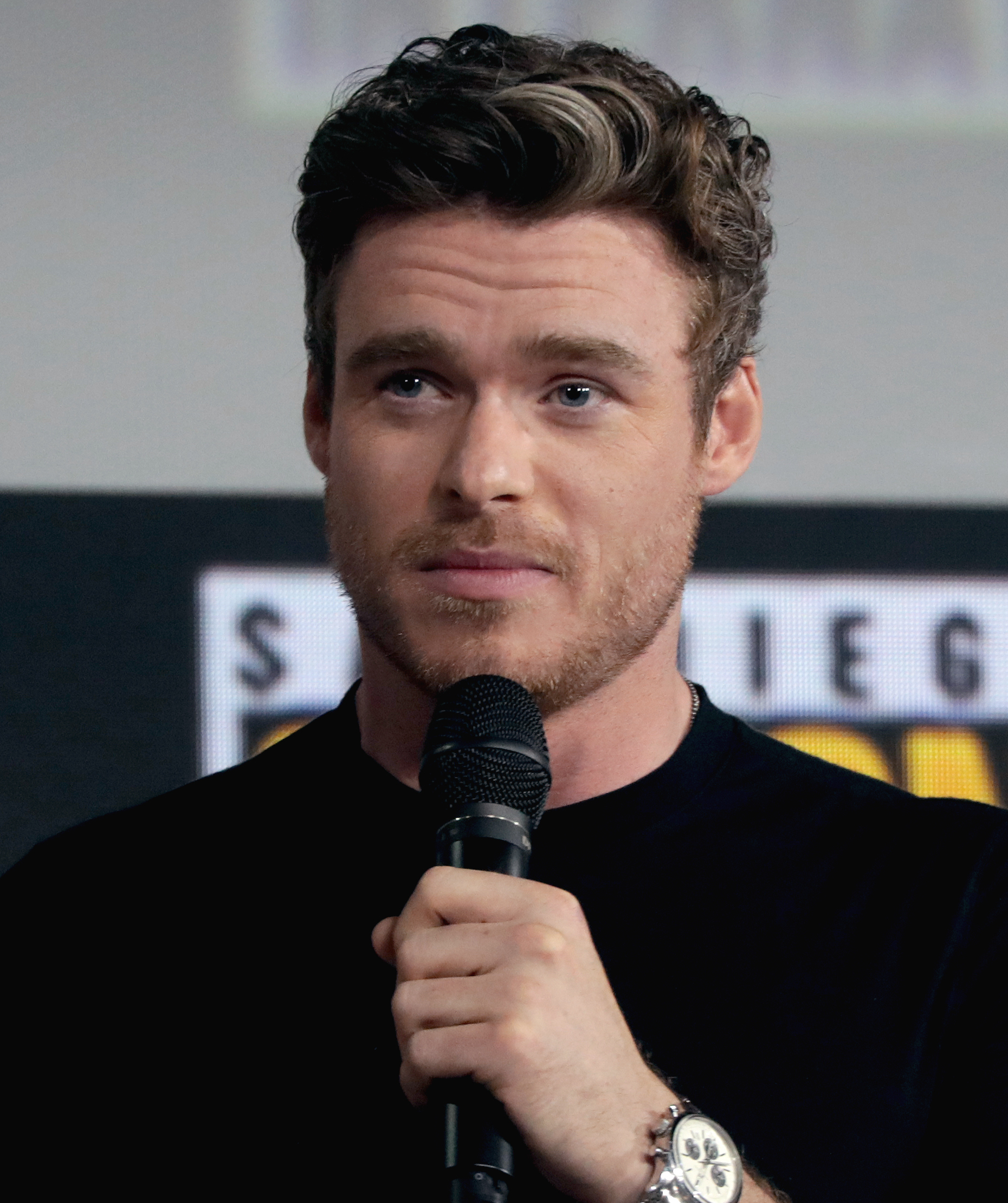
Richard Madden

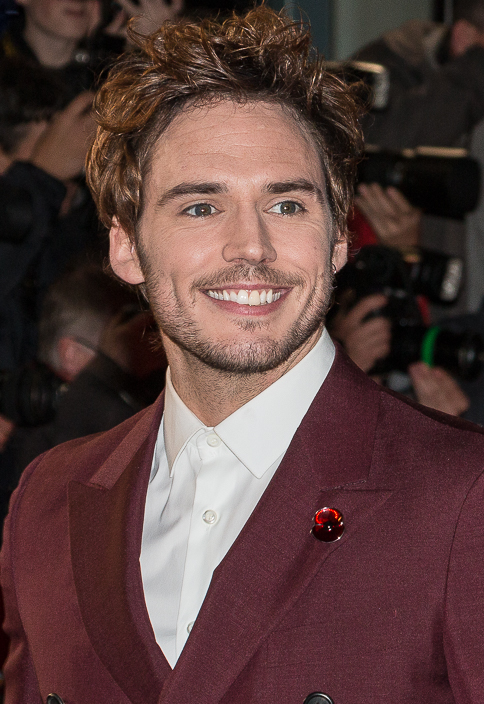
Sam Claflin

- 1 June – Skream, DJ and producer
- 3 June
  - Amar Chadha-Patel, actor, filmmaker, and musician
  - Jordan Crane, rugby player
  - Mike Dodds, football coach
- 4 June
  - Scott Boyd, footballer
  - Oona Chaplin, Spanish-born actress and dancer
  - Nicole Emmanuel, footballer
  - Shelly Woods, Paralympic wheelchair racer
- 5 June – Charlotte Dobson, Olympic sailor
- 8 June – Michelle Cooper, bowler
- 9 June – Luis Felber, British-born Peruvian musician
- 10 June – Zara Dampney, Olympic beach volleyball player
- 12 June
  - Gary Buckland, boxer
  - Scott Flinders, footballer
  - Luke Youngblood, actor
- 13 June – Mark D. Ferguson, film director, screenwriter and camera operator
- 14 June – Jonathan Clare, cricketer
- 15 June
  - Jordan Andrews, composer, musician and producer
  - Dean Bowditch, footballer
- 17 June
  - Steven Davies, cricketer
  - Helen Glover, rower
- 18 June
  - Kevin Bradley, footballer
  - Gareth Duke, Paralympic swimmer
  - Ian Field, cyclo-cross cyclist
  - Richard Madden, actor
- 20 June – Alex Davies, rugby player
- 21 June – Stuart Abbot, footballer
- 23 June – Colin Ryan, actor
- 24 June – Stuart Broad, cricketer
- 25 June
  - Megan Burns, musician and actress
  - Sean Crombie, rugby player
- 26 June – Paddy Coupar, rugby player
- 27 June – Sam Claflin, actor

=== July ===
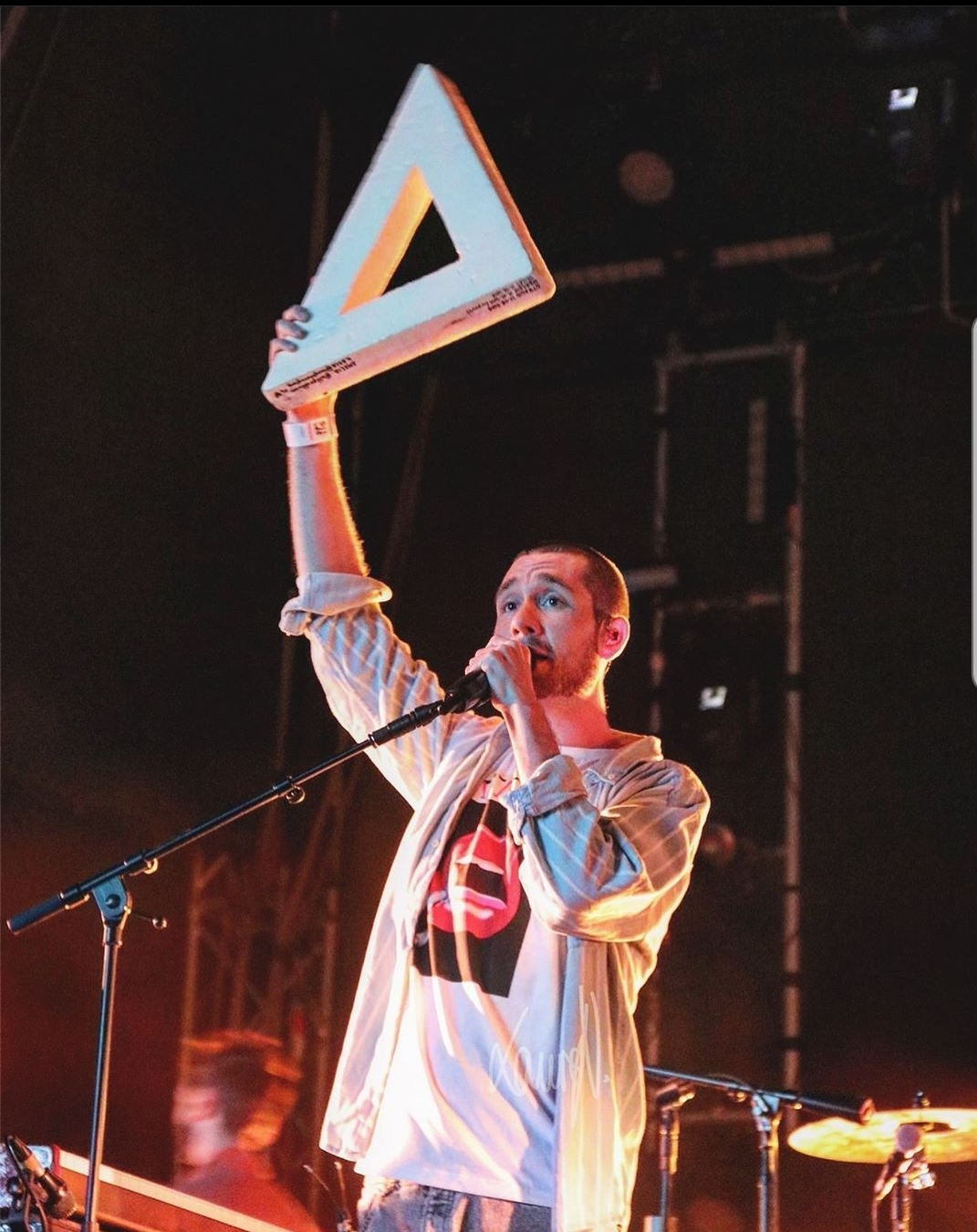
Dan Smith

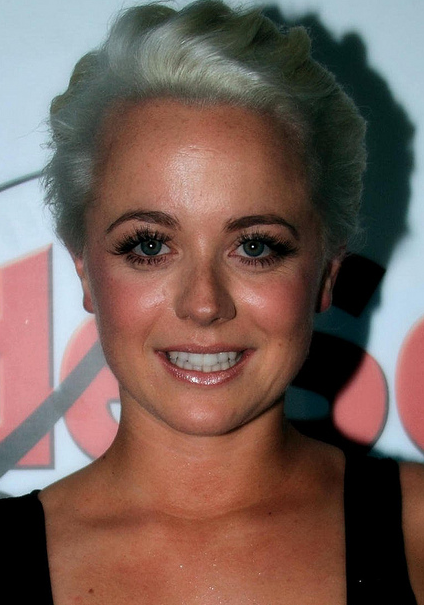
Charlie Clemmow

- 1 July – Sonoya Mizuno, Japanese-born actress, model, and ballerina
- 3 July – Chris Bush, playwright and artistic director
- 4 July
  - Marvin Bartley, footballer
  - Julia Beckett, Olympic swimmer
- 10 July
  - Tom Richards, squash player
  - Scott Westgarth, boxer (d. 2018)
- 11 July
  - Derek Carcary, footballer
  - Ian Cathro, football coach
- 14 July – Dan Smith, singer
- 16 July – James Drury, English-born Virgin Islands footballer
- 17 July – William Easton, footballer
- 21 July
  - Michael Collins, rugby player
  - Rebecca Ferguson, soul singer/songwriter
- 22 July – Robert Campbell, footballer
- 24 July – Alissa Firsova, Russian-born classical composer, pianist, and conductor
- 25 July
  - Kate Butters, basketball player
  - Alan Clyne, squash player
- 26 July – Mathew Birley, footballer
- 29 July – FuntCase, DJ and dubstep producer
- 31 July – Charlie Clemmow, actress

=== August ===
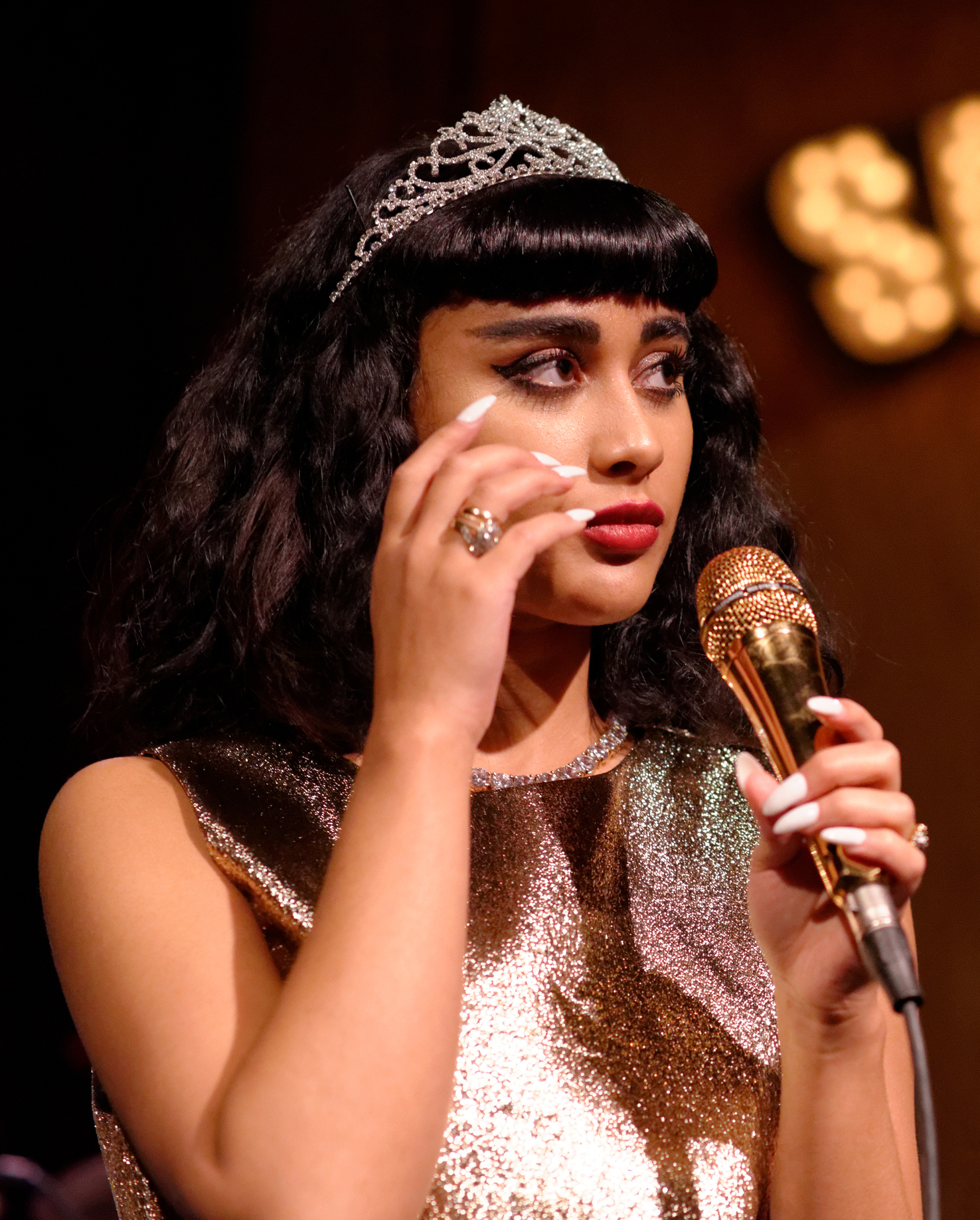
Teddy Sinclair

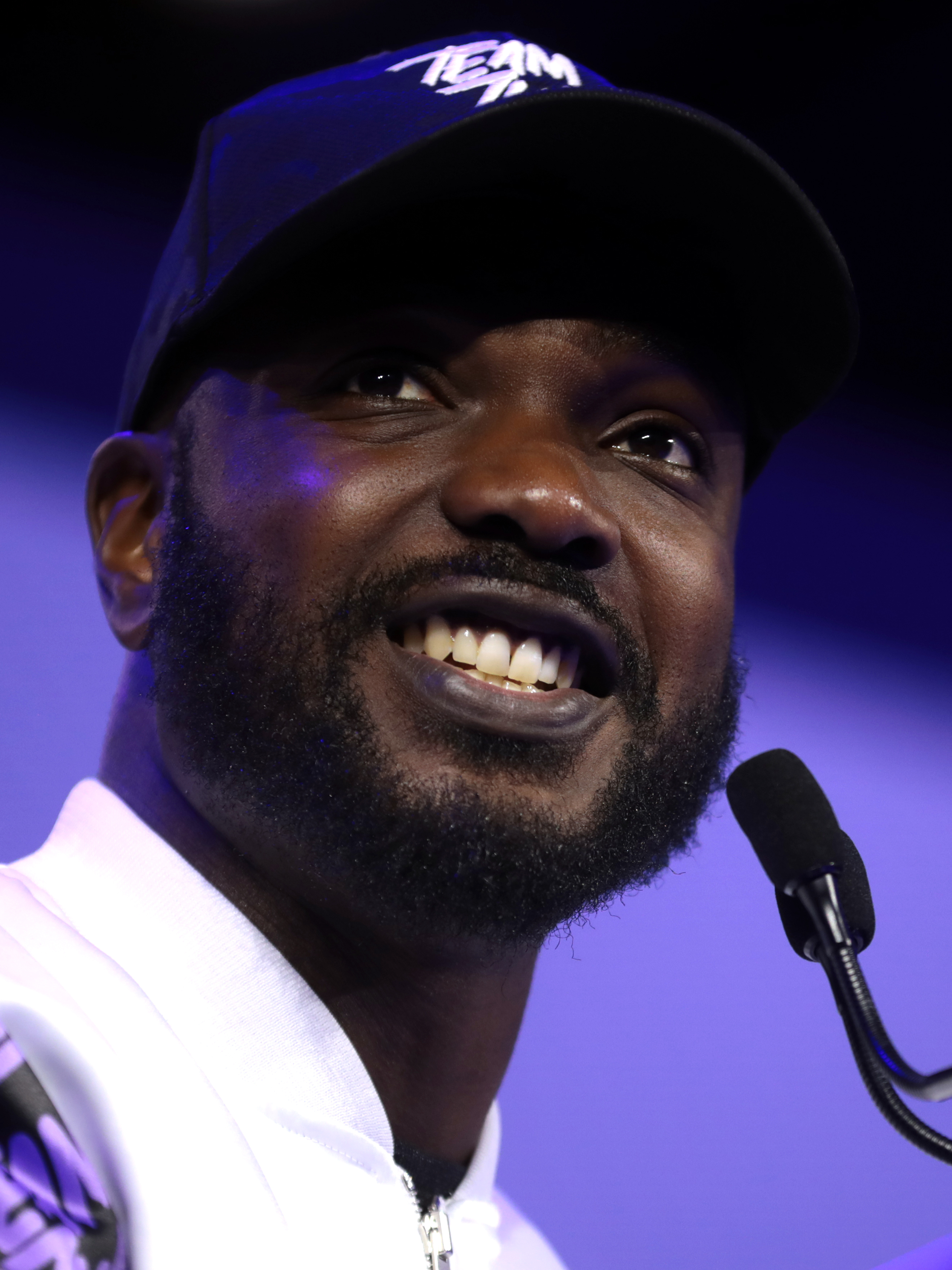
Zuby

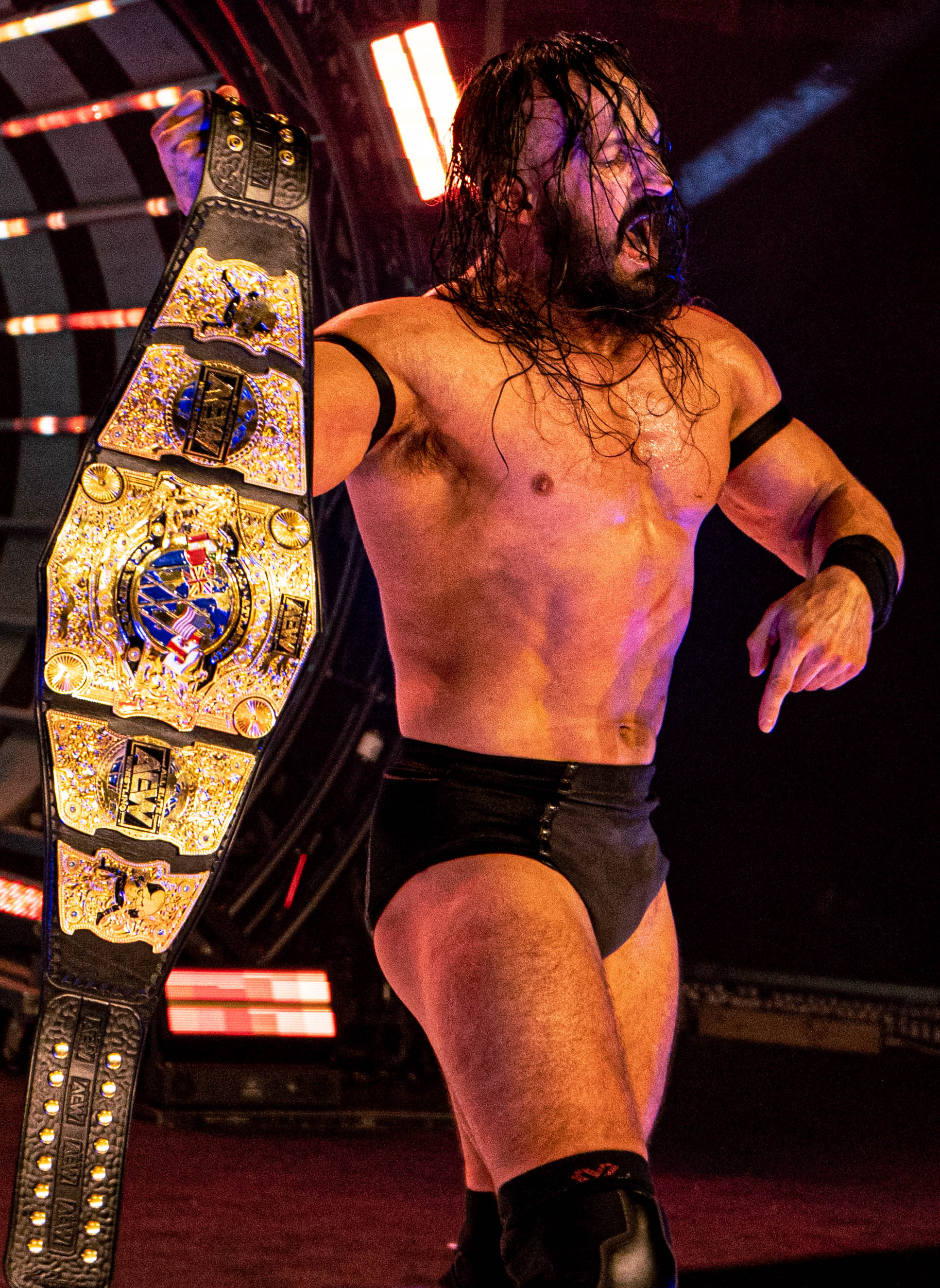
PAC

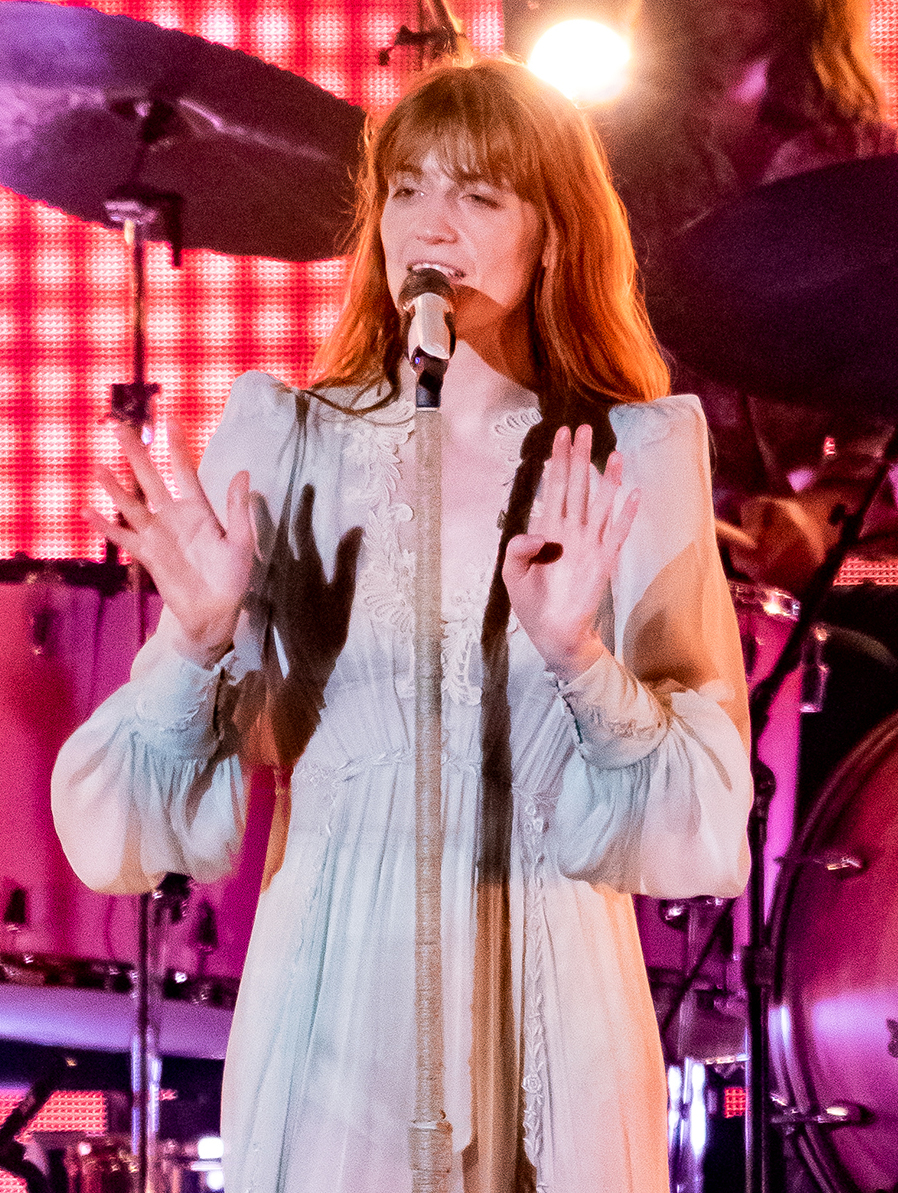
Florence Welch

- 1 August
  - Damien Allen, footballer
  - Daisy May Cooper, actress and writer
- 3 August – Rebekah Cook, motorcycle trials rider
- 4 August – Leon Camier, motorcycle racer
- 5 August – Jamie Baker, tennis player
- 6 August – Nick Brodie, coxswain
- 9 August
  - Robert Adcock, badminton player
  - Aled Brew, rugby player
- 10 August – Ross Burkinshaw, boxer
- 15 August
  - Teddy Sinclair, singer/songwriter
- 16 August
  - Danny Ayres, speedway racer (d. 2020)
  - Niki Birrell, Paralympic sailor
- 19 August
  - Rachael Burford, rugby player
  - Zuby, rapper
- 20 August
  - Grant Anderson, footballer
  - Kerry Barr, curler
  - Steven Campbell, footballer
  - Andrew Surman, footballer
- 22 August
  - James Frost, guitarist, keyboardist and backing vocalist for The Automatic
  - Bobby Cole Norris, television personality
  - PAC, wrestler
- 24 August
  - Jonny Cocker, racing driver
  - Jamie Cox, boxer
- 27 August – Laura Bates, feminist writer
- 28 August
  - Stuart Bithell, Olympic sailor
  - Paul Crook, rugby player
  - Florence Welch, English singer/songwriter
- 30 August – Theo Hutchcraft, pop musician

=== September ===
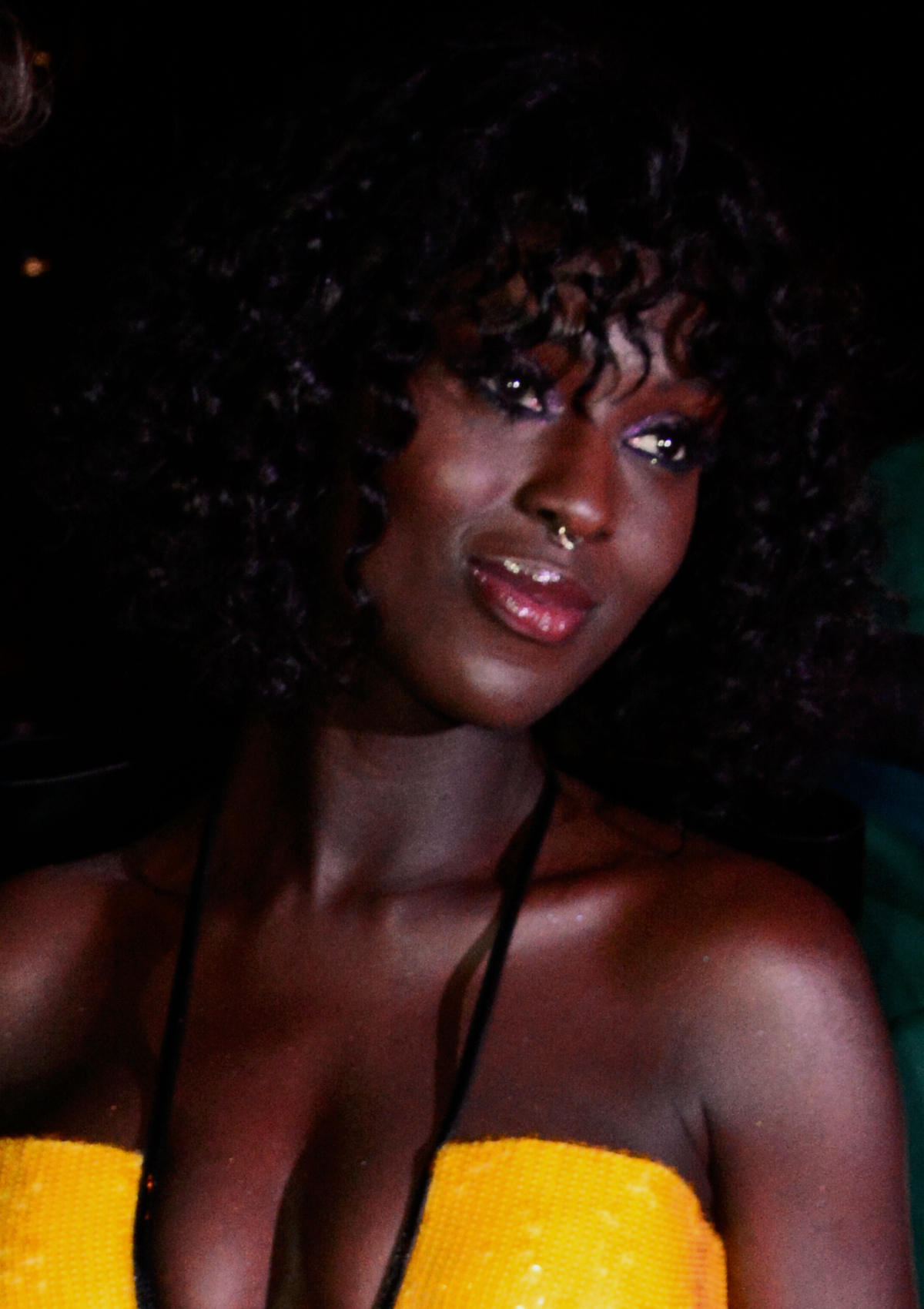
Jodie Turner-Smith

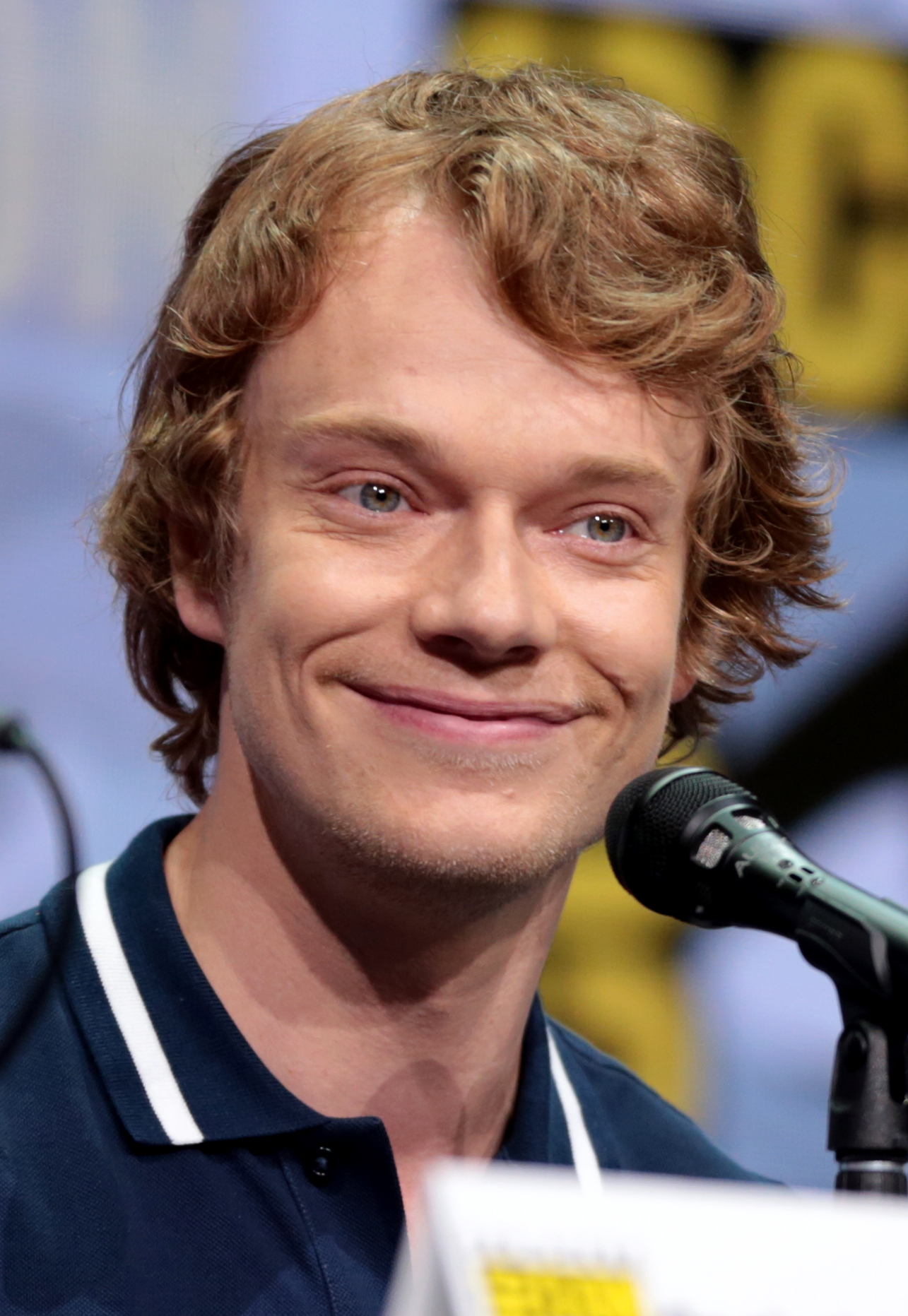
Alfie Allen

- 1 September – Theo Burrell, antiques expert and broadcaster (d. 2026)
- 6 September
  - Daniel Dillon, footballer
  - Phil Doughty, footballer
- 7 September
  - Charlie Daniels, footballer
  - Jodie Turner-Smith, actress and model
- 11 September – Adam Dixon, hockey player
- 12 September
  - Alfie Allen, actor
  - Akwasi Fobi-Edusei, footballer
  - Dawn Foster, journalist, broadcaster, and author (d. 2021)
- 13 September – Darren Daniel, rugby player
- 14 September
  - Paul Brannigan, actor
  - Joel Byrom, footballer
- 15 September – Jenna McCorkell, figure skater
- 16 September – Hasib Hussain, Islamic terrorist, murders 13 people during 7 July 2005 London bombings (suicide 2005)
- 17 September
  - Jack Adams, rugby union player (d. 2021)
  - Rob Elvins, footballer
  - Ashley Foyle, footballer
  - Sophie, Scottish songwriter and record producer (d. 2021)
- 18 September
  - Cammy Bell, footballer and coach
  - Keeley Hazell, model
- 22 September
  - Casisdead, rapper and MC
  - Ryan Dicker, footballer
  - Steven Findlay, rugby player
- 23 September – Lisa Farnell, Canadian-born curler
- 25 September – Josh Bateman, rugby player
- 26 September – Martin Cranie, footballer
- 27 September
  - Efe Echanomi, Nigerian-born footballer
  - Greg Fleming, footballer
- 29 September – Cerith Flinn, actor

=== October ===
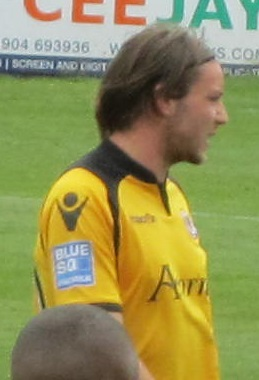
Sam Foley

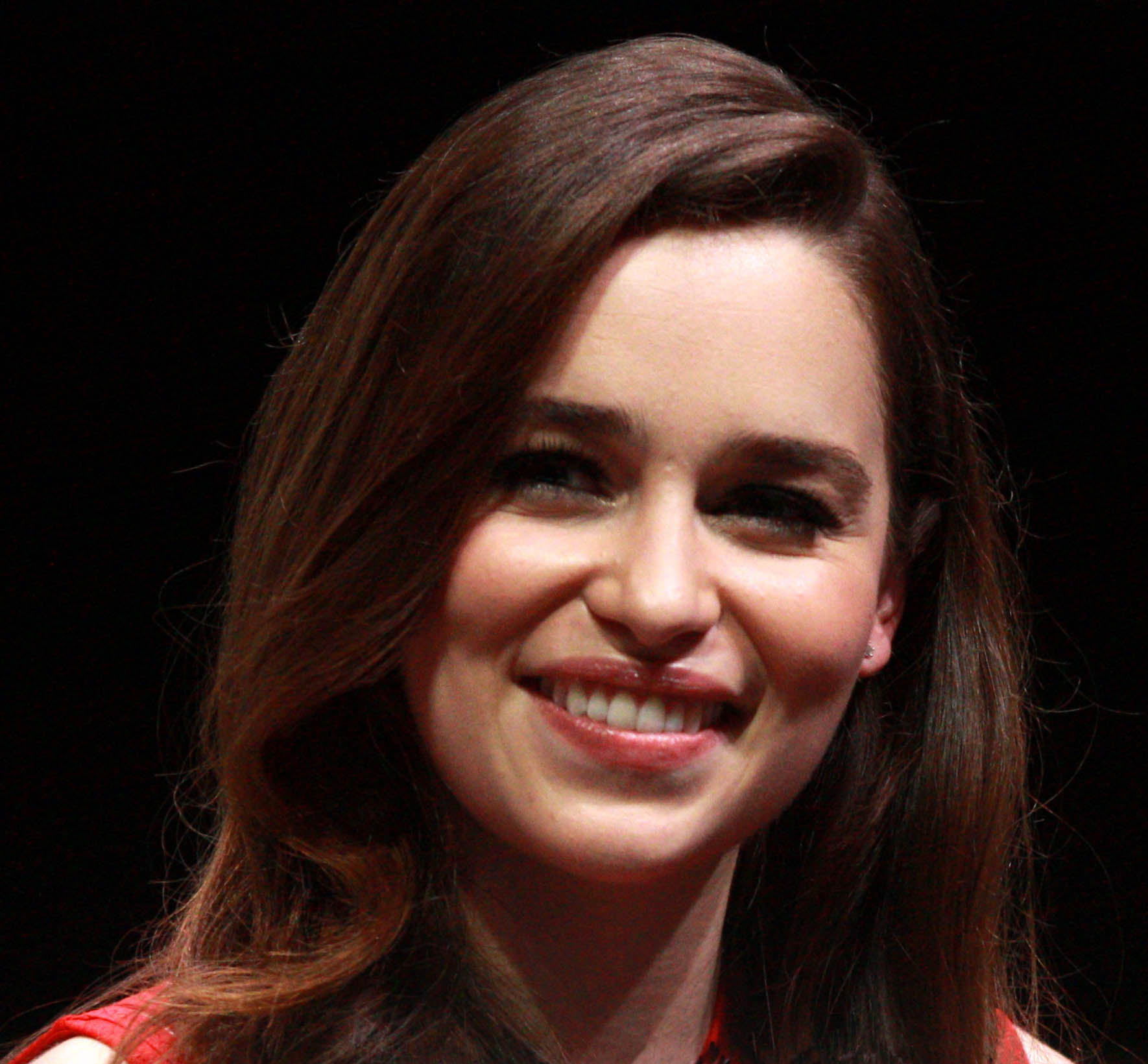
Emilia Clarke

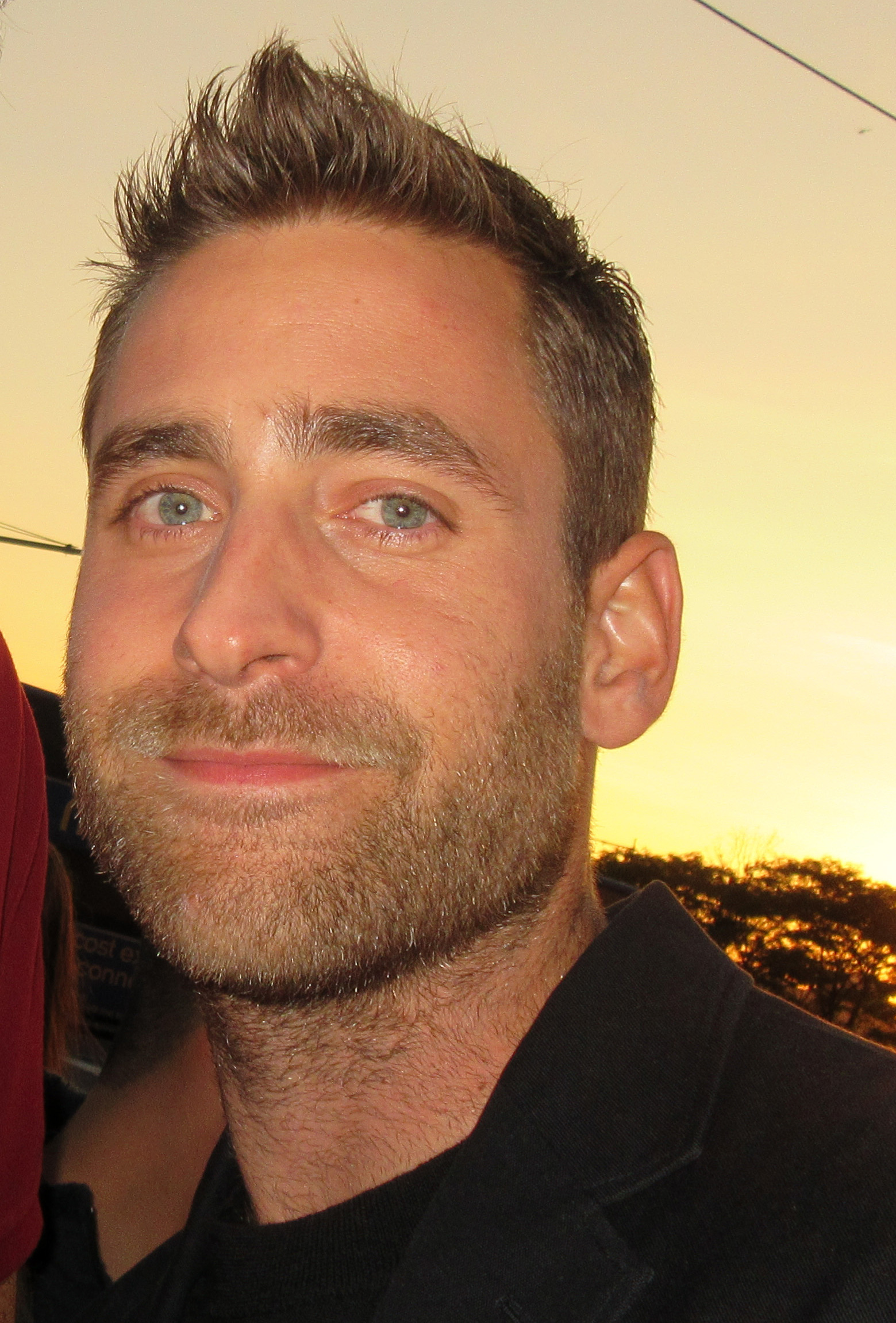
Oliver Jackson-Cohen

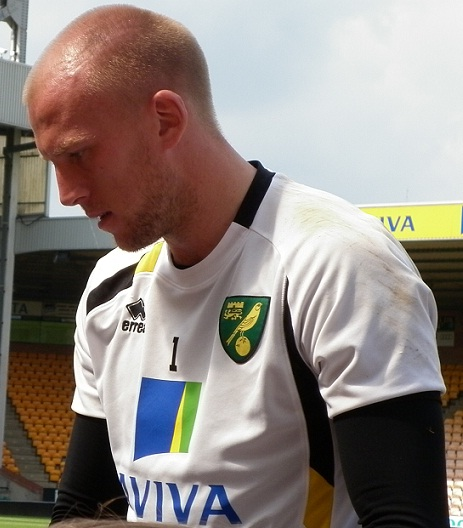
John Ruddy

- 1 October
  - Paul Edwards, boxer
  - Carl Finnigan, footballer
  - Danny Francis, footballer
- 2 October – Tom Hudson, actor
- 3 October
  - Alex Ball, cricketer
  - Calum Forrester, rugby player
- 4 October – Gary Boyd, golfer
- 6 October – Michael Eilberg, dressage rider
- 8 October
  - Louis Dodds, footballer
  - George Flanagan, rugby player
- 9 October – Sam Ashton, footballer
- 10 October
  - Jamie Conlan, boxer
  - Matty Dale, rugby player
  - Lucy Griffiths, actress
- 13 October
  - Gabby Agbonlahor, footballer
  - Beth Croft, Christian musician
- 14 October
  - Matt Bulman, footballer
  - Tom Craddock, footballer
- 15 October – Tommy Forecast, footballer
- 16 October – Craig Pickering, sprinter
- 17 October – Sam Foley, footballer
- 18 October – Aidan Collins, footballer
- 19 October – Anthony England, rugby player
- 20 October
  - Charlie Brown, singer/songwriter
  - Charlie Duffell, cricketer
  - Ryan Esders, rugby player
- 21 October – Keith Barker, cricketer
- 22 October
  - John Boyle, footballer
  - Phil Burleigh, rugby player
  - Dale Roberts, footballer (d. 2010)
- 23 October
  - Emilia Clarke, actress
  - Lee Costello, motorcycle racer
- 24 October
  - Will Bragg, cricketer
  - Oliver Jackson-Cohen, actor
  - John Ruddy, footballer

=== November ===
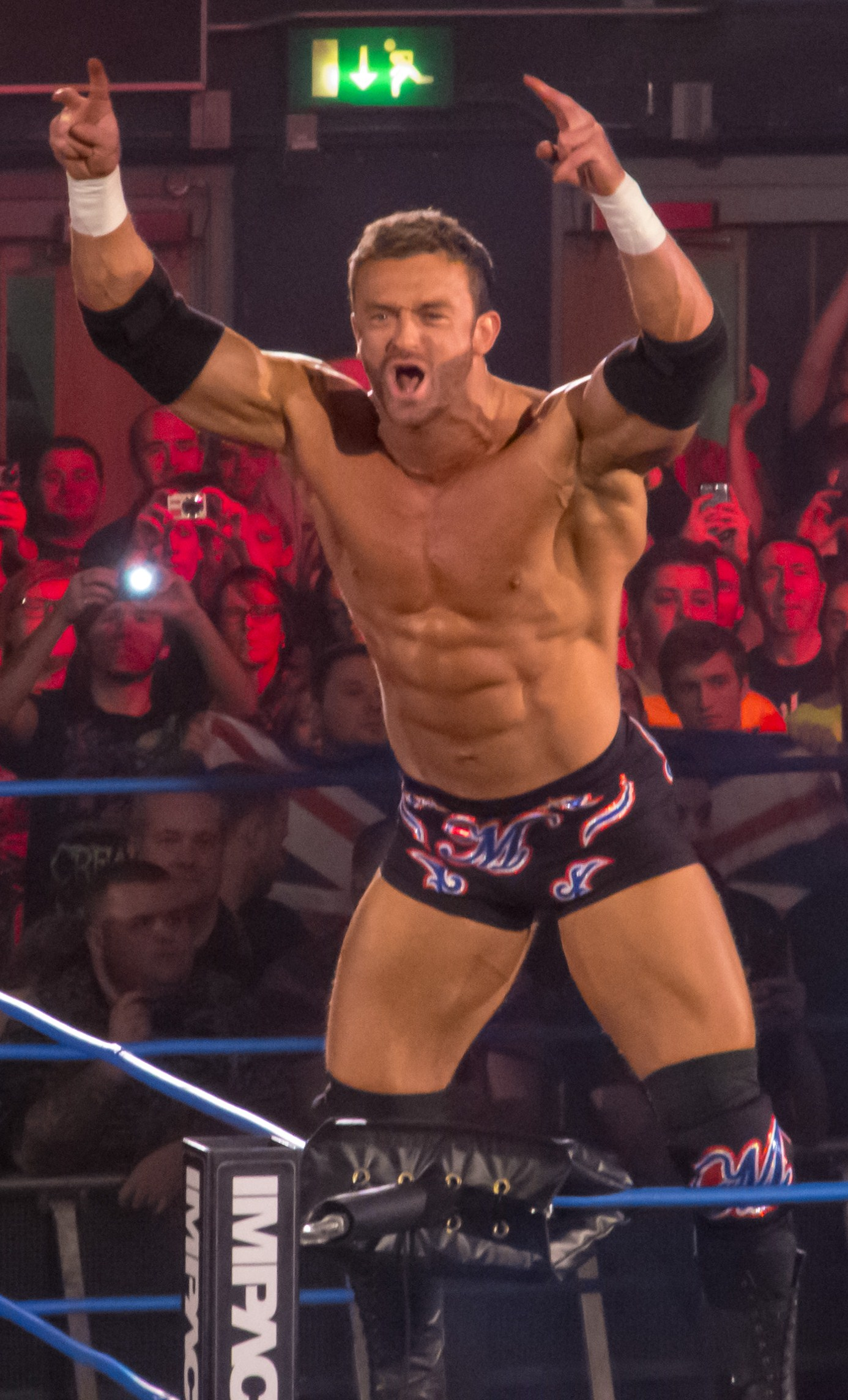
Nick Aldis

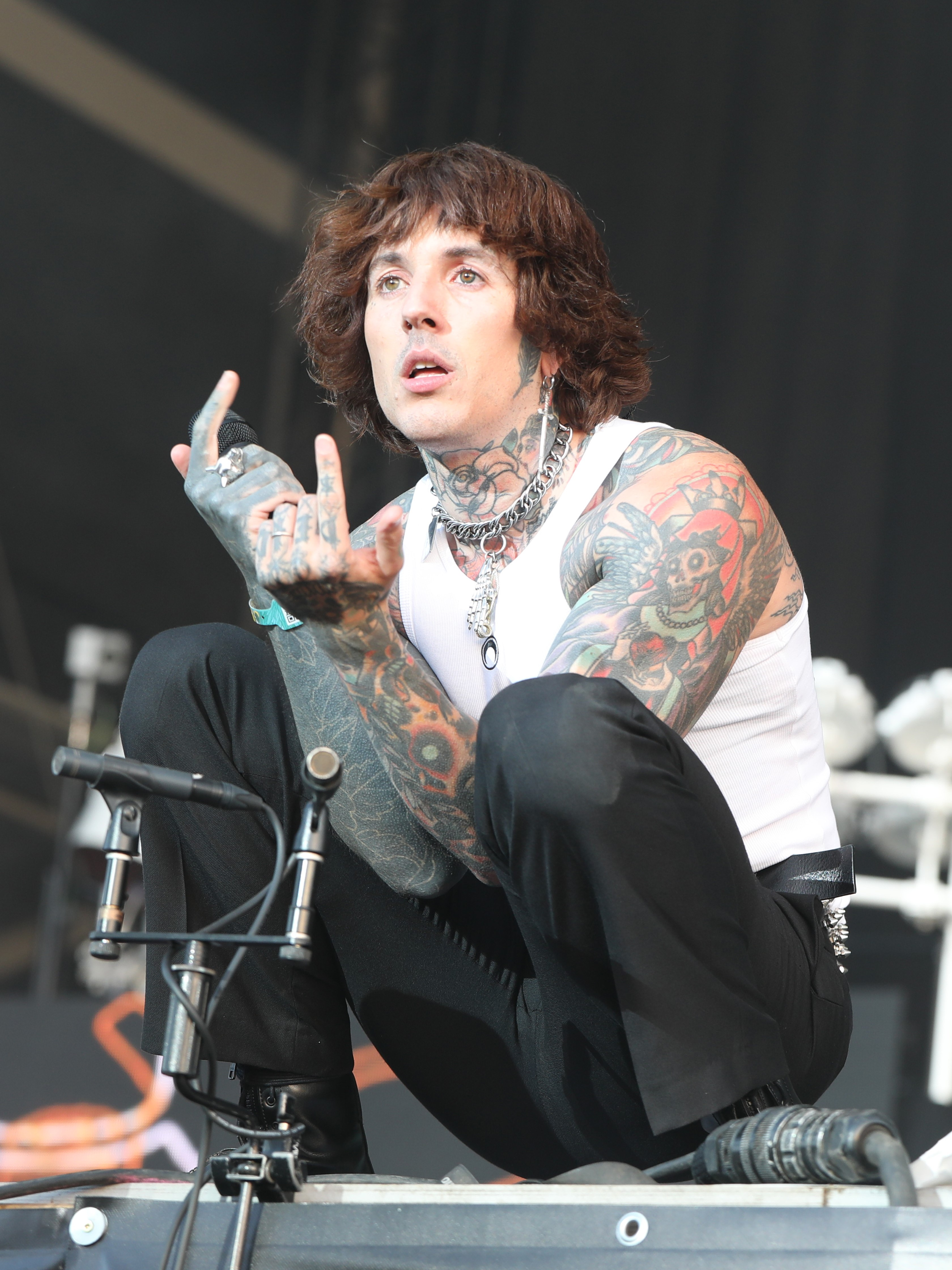
Oliver Sykes

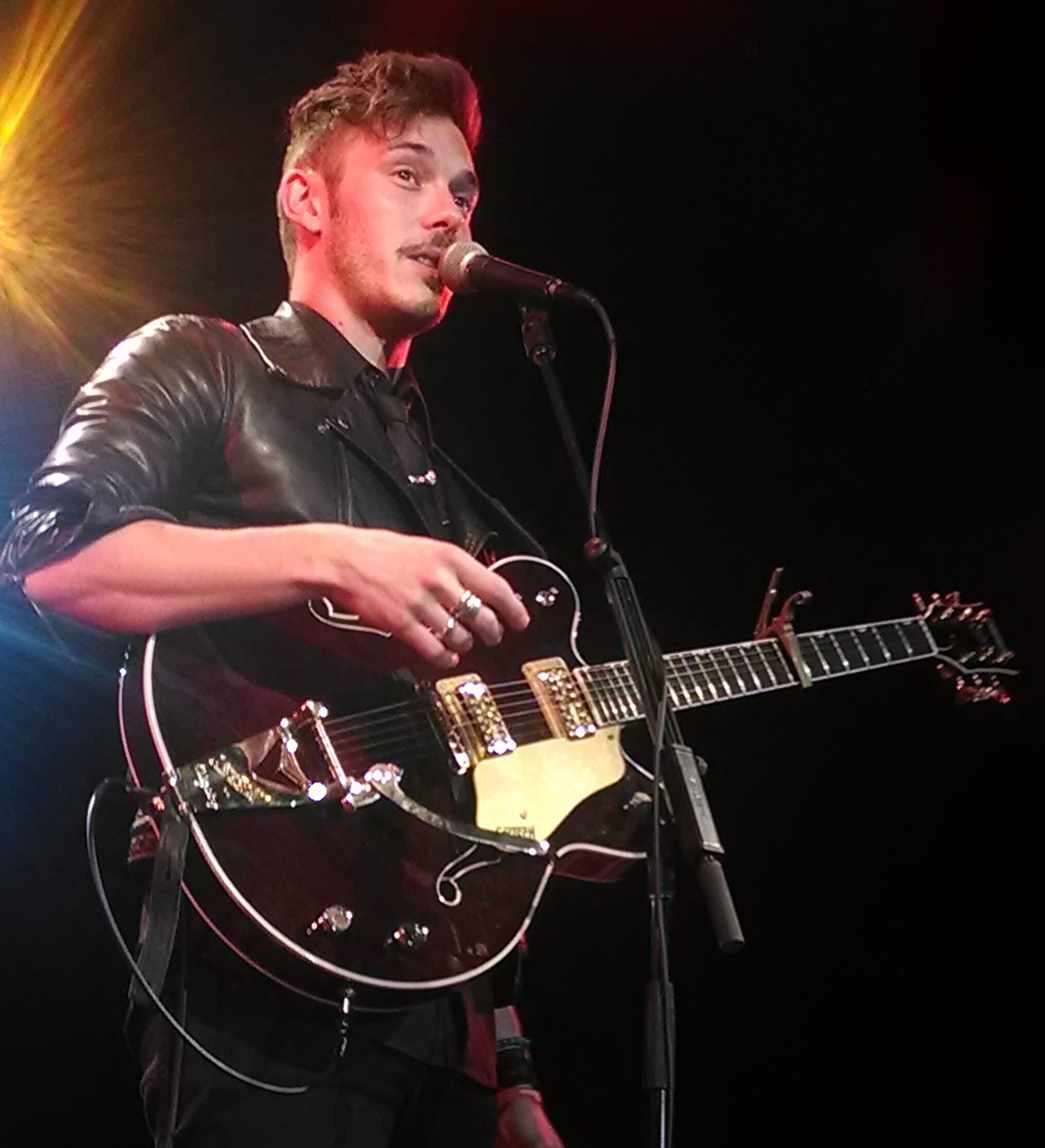
Sam Palladio

- 2 November – Cherrelle Fennell, Olympic gymnast
- 3 November
  - Scott Armstrong, rugby player
  - Antonia Thomas, actress
- 4 November – Seve Benson, golfer
- 6 November
  - Nick Aldis, wrestler
  - Craig Bryson, footballer
- 8 November
  - Draft, electronic music producer, DJ and songwriter
  - Jamie Roberts, rugby player
- 10 November – Travis Binnion, English-born Irish footballer and cricketer
- 13 November
  - Kevin Bridges, stand-up comedian
  - Adam Cox, gymnast
- 14 November
  - Richard Buck, sprinter
  - Matt Cook, rugby player
  - Ashley Fuller, footballer
- 15 November
  - Jamie Chestney, bowler
  - Jared Hodgkiss, footballer
- 16 November
  - Anthony Crolla, boxer
  - Ayden Duffy, footballer
- 17 November
  - Matt Barron, rugby player
  - Greg Rutherford, Olympic track-and-field athlete
- 18 November – Richard Strachan, personal trainer and sprinter
- 19 November – Sam Betty, rugby player
- 20 November – Oliver Sykes, vocalist and frontman for Bring Me the Horizon
- 21 November
  - Tom Cahill, footballer
  - Sam Palladio, actor and musician
- 22 November
  - Jack Blumenau, actor
  - Paul Dixon, footballer
- 23 November – Liam Davis, footballer
- 25 November – Louise Alder, lyric soprano
- 26 November – Nathan Craze, hockey player
- 27 November
  - Sammy Dobson, actress
  - George Eaton, journalist
- 28 November
  - Dan Carden, politician
  - Helen Wood, TV personality
- 29 November – Joe Colbeck, footballer

=== December ===
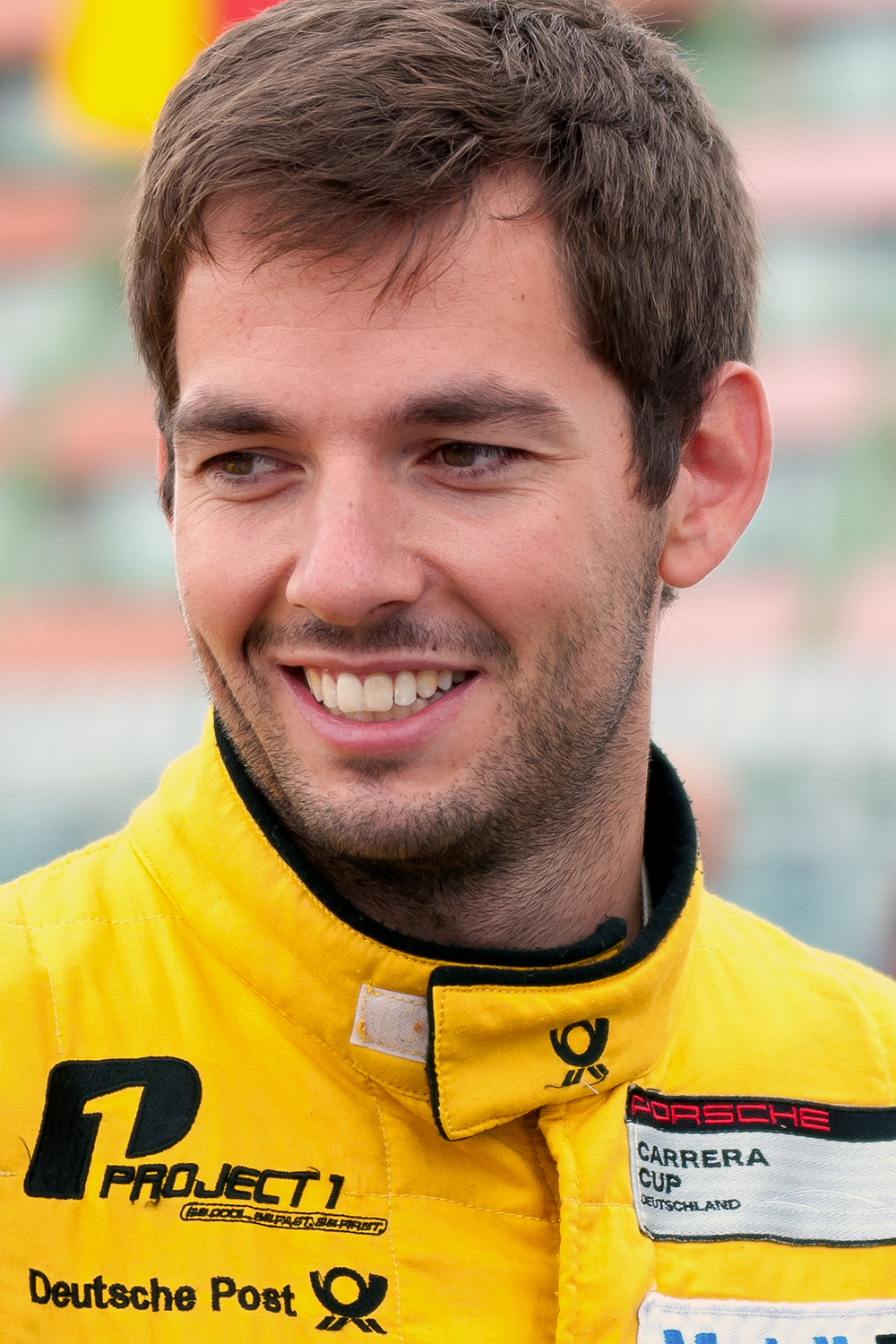
Sean Edwards

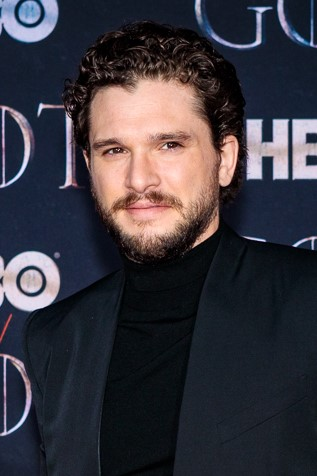
Kit Harington

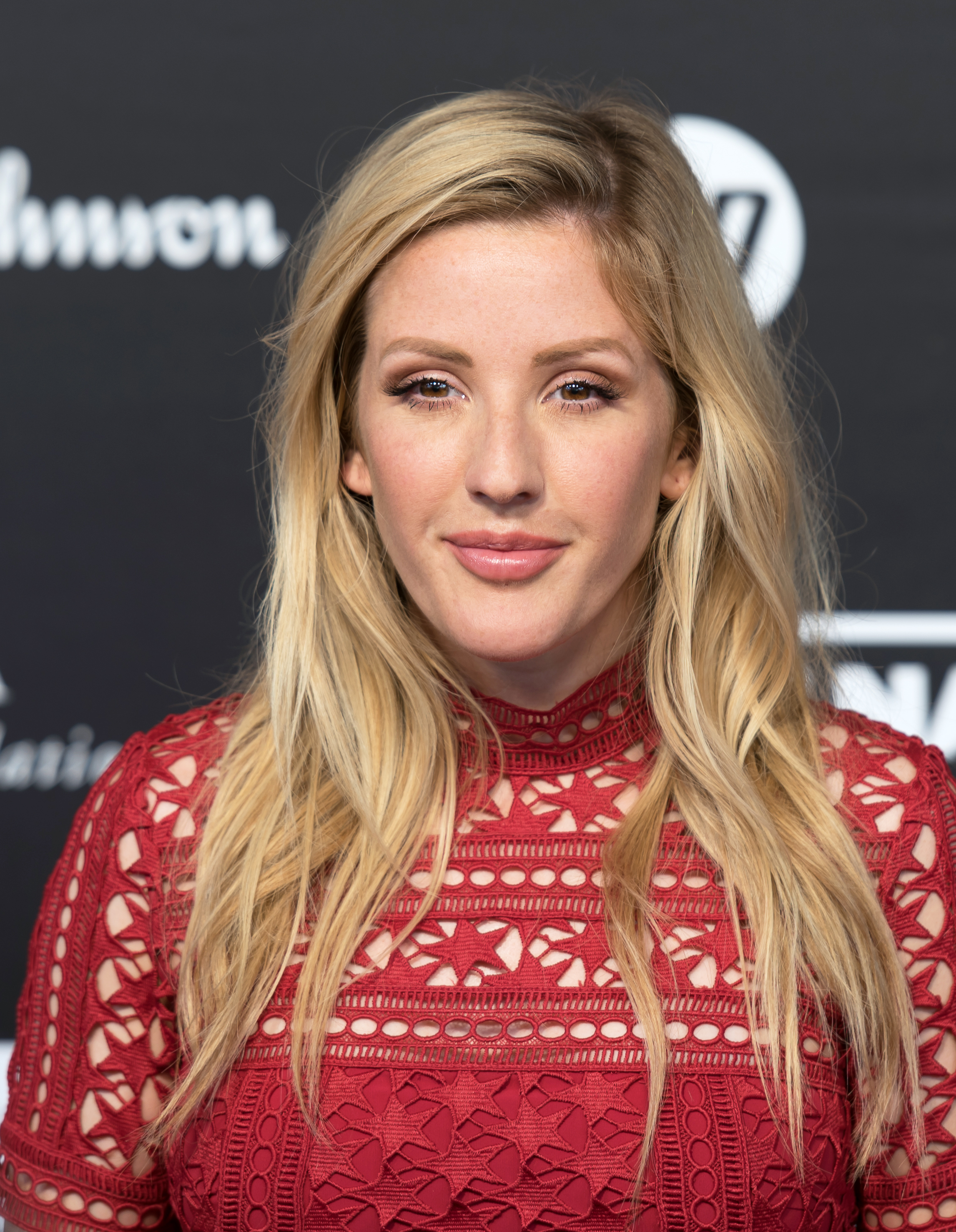
Ellie Goulding

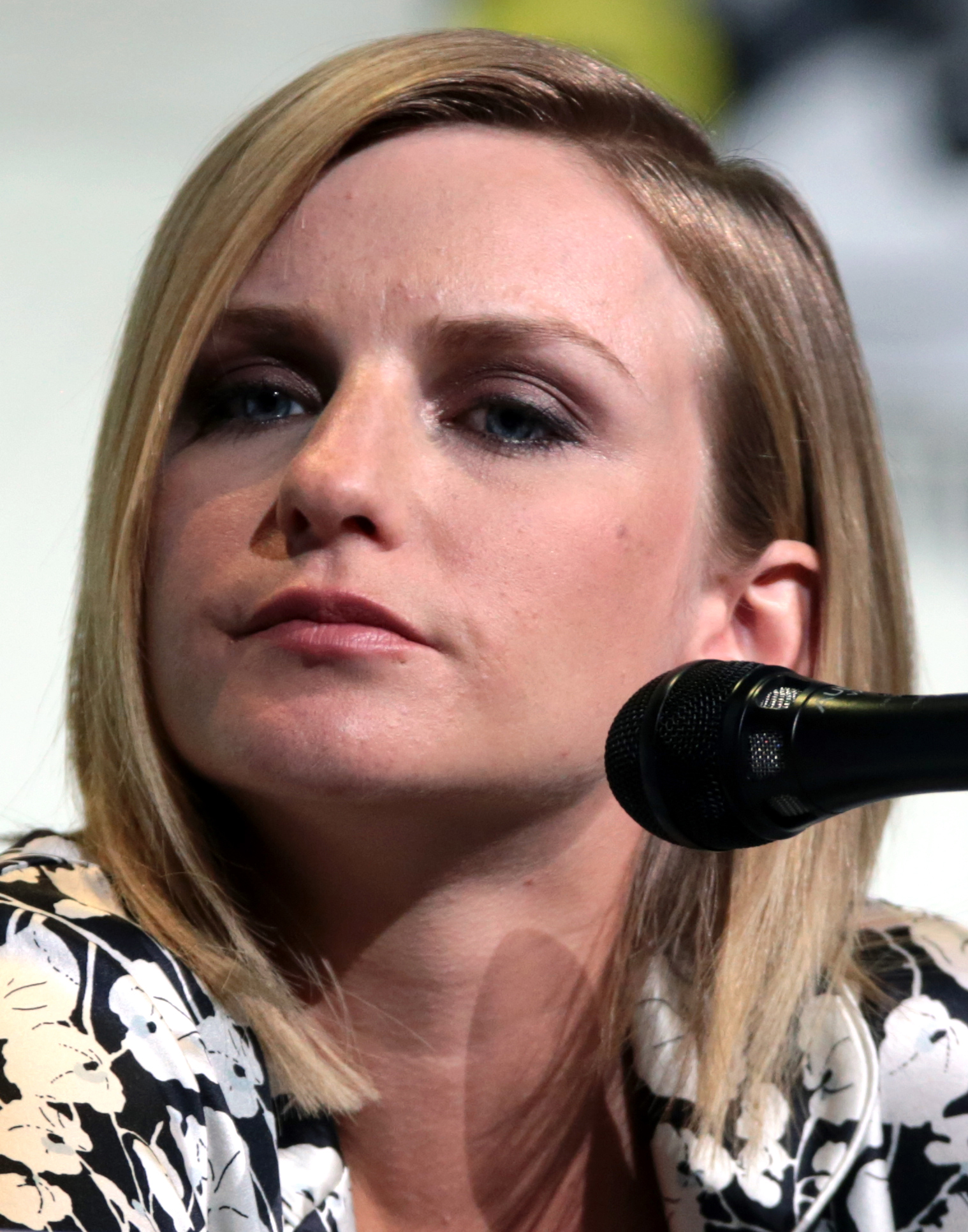
Faye Marsay

- 1 December
  - Michael Bakare, footballer
  - Natasha O'Keeffe, actress
  - Andrew Tate, internet personality
- 2 December – Adam Le Fondre, footballer
- 5 December – Leigh Alderson, ballet dancer
- 6 December – Sean Edwards, racing driver (d. 2013)
- 8 December
  - Lara Carroll, English-born Australian Olympic swimmer
  - Amir Khan, boxer Dale Appleby, cyclist
- 10 December – Matthew Bates, footballer
- 11 December
  - Gary Carr, actor, dancer, and musician
  - Kris Doolan, footballer
  - Lee Peltier, footballer
- 12 December
  - Sean Clohessy, footballer
  - Ayden Faal, rugby player
  - Jo Fraser, painter
- 13 December – Ben Evans, golfer
- 14 December
  - Phil Boulton, rugby player
  - Ryan Dickson, footballer
- 18 December
  - Eku Edewor, actress, television presenter, and model
  - Harry Fry, racehorse trainer
- 19 December
  - Calvin Andrew, footballer
  - Dale Appleby, cyclist
- 20 December
  - Ian Bibby, cyclist
  - Benjamin Brierley, English-born German rugby player
  - Chris Cornes, footballer
- 23 December – Tom Birchall, motorcycle-with-sidecar racer
- 25 December – Doug Loft, footballer (d. 2026)
- 26 December
  - Josh Beech, English-born American singer/songwriter
  - Nichola Burley, actress
  - Emily Fleeshman, actress
  - Kit Harington, actor
- 27 December – Liam Craig, footballer
- 28 December – Hannah Elsy, rower
- 30 December
  - Nikki Brammeier, cyclist
  - Ellie Goulding, singer
  - Faye Marsay, actress

=== Date Unknown ===
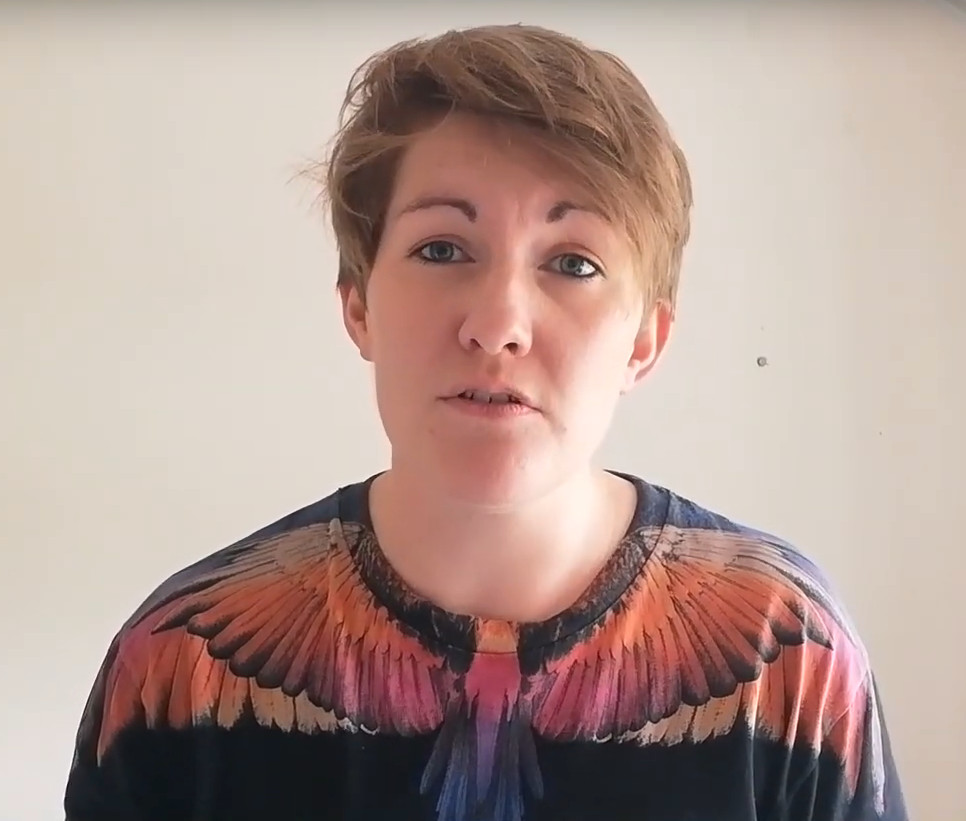
Caroline Bird

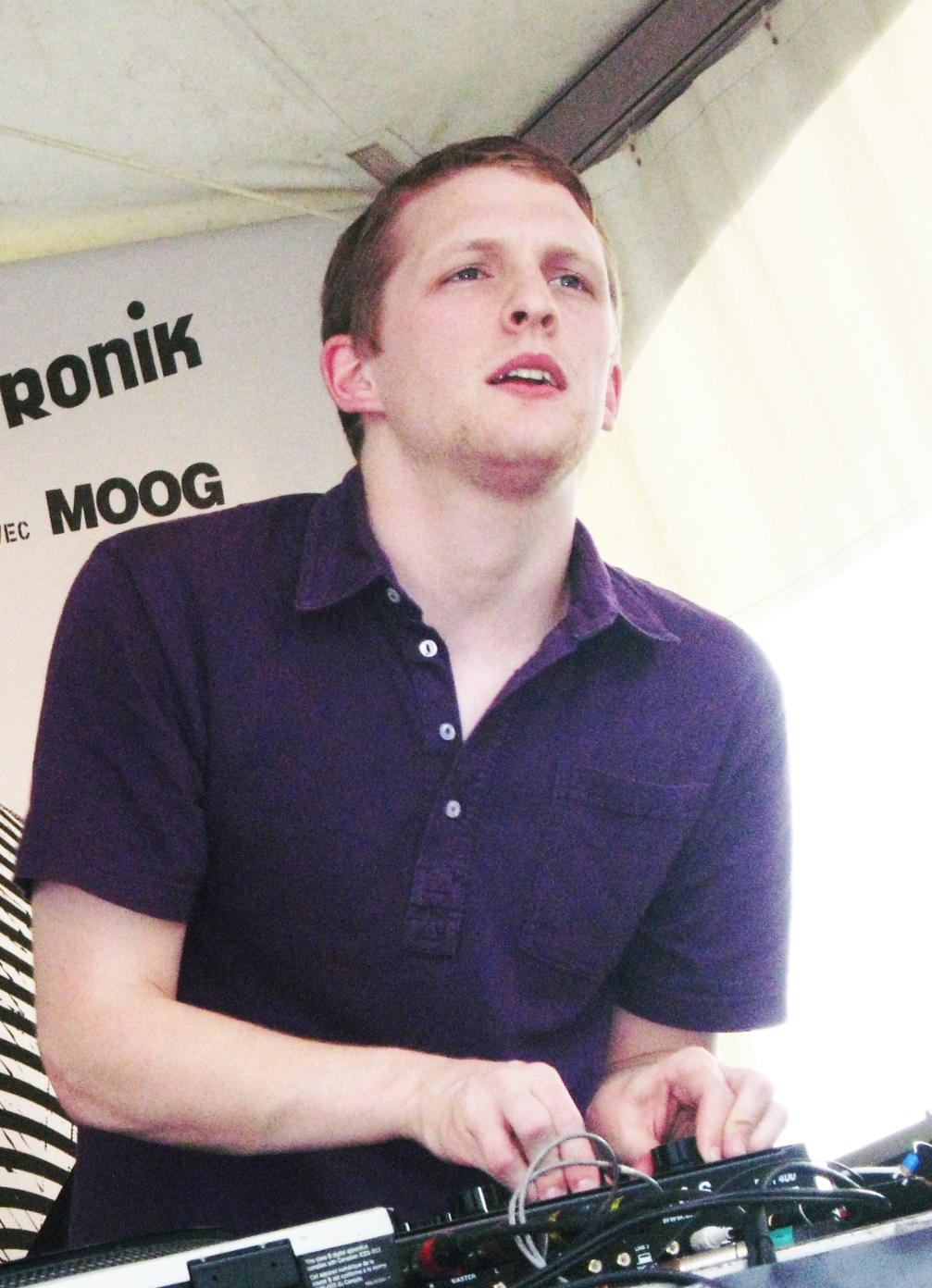
Floating Points

- Alice Birch, playwright and screenwriter
- Caroline Bird, poet, playwright and author
- Brian Blackwell, convicted murderer
- Joe Borg, screenwriter
- Millie Brown, performance artist
- Hugh Brunt, music conductor
- Jen Calleja, writer and literary translator
- Poppy Corbett, playwright
- Thomas Crowther, professor of ecology at ETH Zurich and co-chair of the advisory board for the UN Decade on Ecosystem Restoration
- Deckscar, DJ and music producer
- Ryan Edgar, footballer
- Laura Evans, snooker player
- Martin Paul Eve, academic, writer and disability rights campaigner
- Floating Points, electronic music producer, DJ and musician
- Katrina Forrester, political theorist and historian
- Danny Fox, artist
- Martha Spurrier, human rights lawyer

== Deaths ==
=== January ===
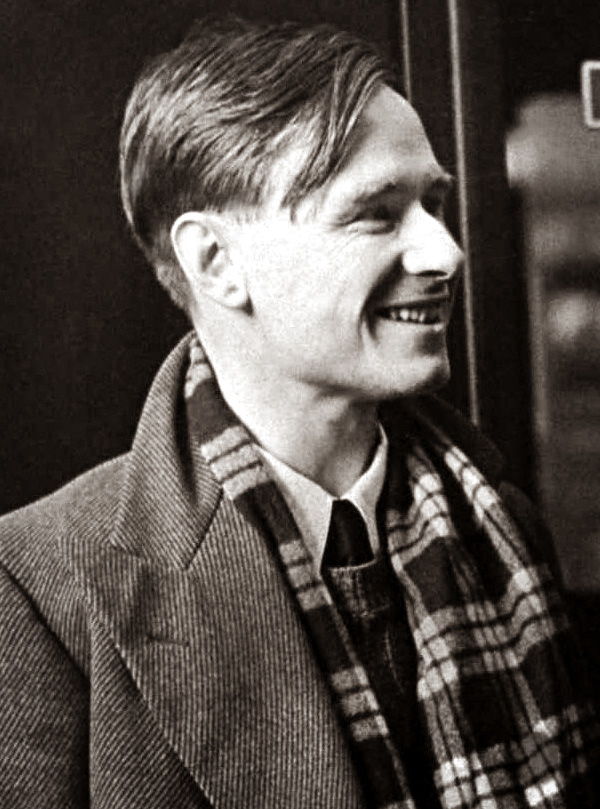
Christopher Isherwood

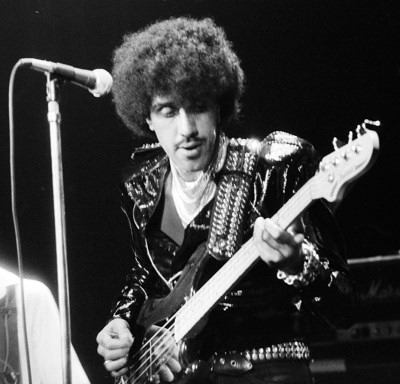
Phil Lynott

- 1 January
  - Lord David Cecil, historian and biographer (born 1902)
  - Kenneth de Burgh Codrington, archaeologist (born 1899)
- 2 January
  - Sir John Howard, civil engineer (born 1901)
  - Patrick Vanden-Bempde-Johnstone, 4th Baron Derwent, peer (born 1901)
- 3 January
  - John Cronin, Labour politician (born 1916)
  - Dustin Gee, comedian (born 1942)
- 4 January
  - Christopher Isherwood, novelist (born 1904)
  - Phil Lynott, Irish singer, Thin Lizzy frontman (born 1949)
- 5 January
  - Sir John Barlow, 2nd Baronet, politician (born 1898)
  - Thomas Heathcote, actor (born 1917)
- 8 January
  - Basil Fitzherbert, 14th Baron Stafford, peer (born 1926)
  - Sidney Harrison, composer and pianist (born 1903)
  - Mansel Thomas, Welsh composer (born 1909)
- 9 January – W. S. Graham, Scottish poet (born 1918)
- 10 January – Martin Stevens, Conservative politician (born 1929)
- 11 January – Sid Chaplin, author and screenwriter (born 1916)
- 16 January
  - Sir Bill Richardson, journalist (born 1909)
  - Peter Waterman, boxer (born 1934)
- 20 January
  - Sidney Barton, Labour politician (born 1909)
  - Stanley George Browne, medical missionary (born 1907)
  - Alex Munro, Scottish comedian (born 1911)
  - Elizabeth Nickell-Lean, opera singer (born 1908)
- 21 January
  - Sir Gordon MacMillan, Scottish Army general (born 1897)
  - Gilbert Roberts, Royal Navy captain (born 1900)
- 22 January
  - Scott Dobson, art critic and writer (born 1918)
  - Thomas Baden Morris, author (born 1900)
- 24 January – John Vaughan Wilkes, educationalist (born 1902)
- 26 January – Nicholas Moore, poet (born 1918)
- 27 January
  - Arthur Llewellyn Basham, historian and Indologist (born 1914)
  - Robert Fraser, art dealer (born 1937)
  - George Wade, potter (born 1891)

=== February ===
- 1 February – Dick James, singer and record producer (born 1920)
- 4 February – Herbert Smith, film producer (born 1901)
- 6 February – Frederick Coutts, Salvation Army officer (born 1899)
- 7 February – Dick Southwood, Olympic rower (born 1906)
- 10 February – Brian Aherne, actor (born 1902)
- 14 February – Edmund Rubbra, composer (born 1901)
- 15 February – Harry Hall, botanist (born 1906)
- 17 February – Nesta Wells, first woman police surgeon in the United Kingdom (born 1892)
- 21 February – Margaret Hunter, Scottish communist (born 1922)
- 22 February
  - Tom Bradshaw, Scottish footballer (born 1904)
  - Anthony Rawlinson, civil servant (born 1926)
- 23 February – Beatrix Thomson, actress (born 1900)
- 26 February – Charles Gibson Connell, Scottish ornithologist (born 1899)
- 27 February – Nancy Brysson Morrison, author (born 1903)
- 28 February – Sir Thomas Williams, Labour politician (born 1915)

=== March ===
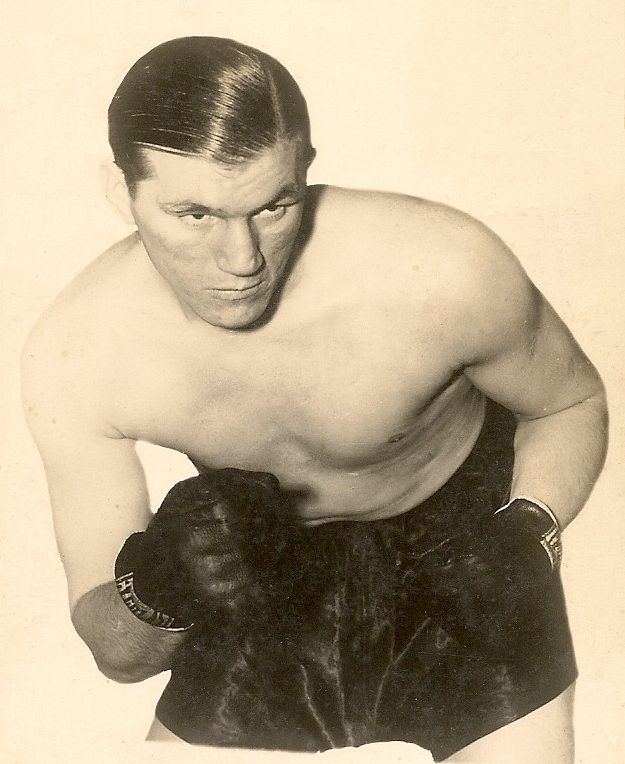
Tommy Farr

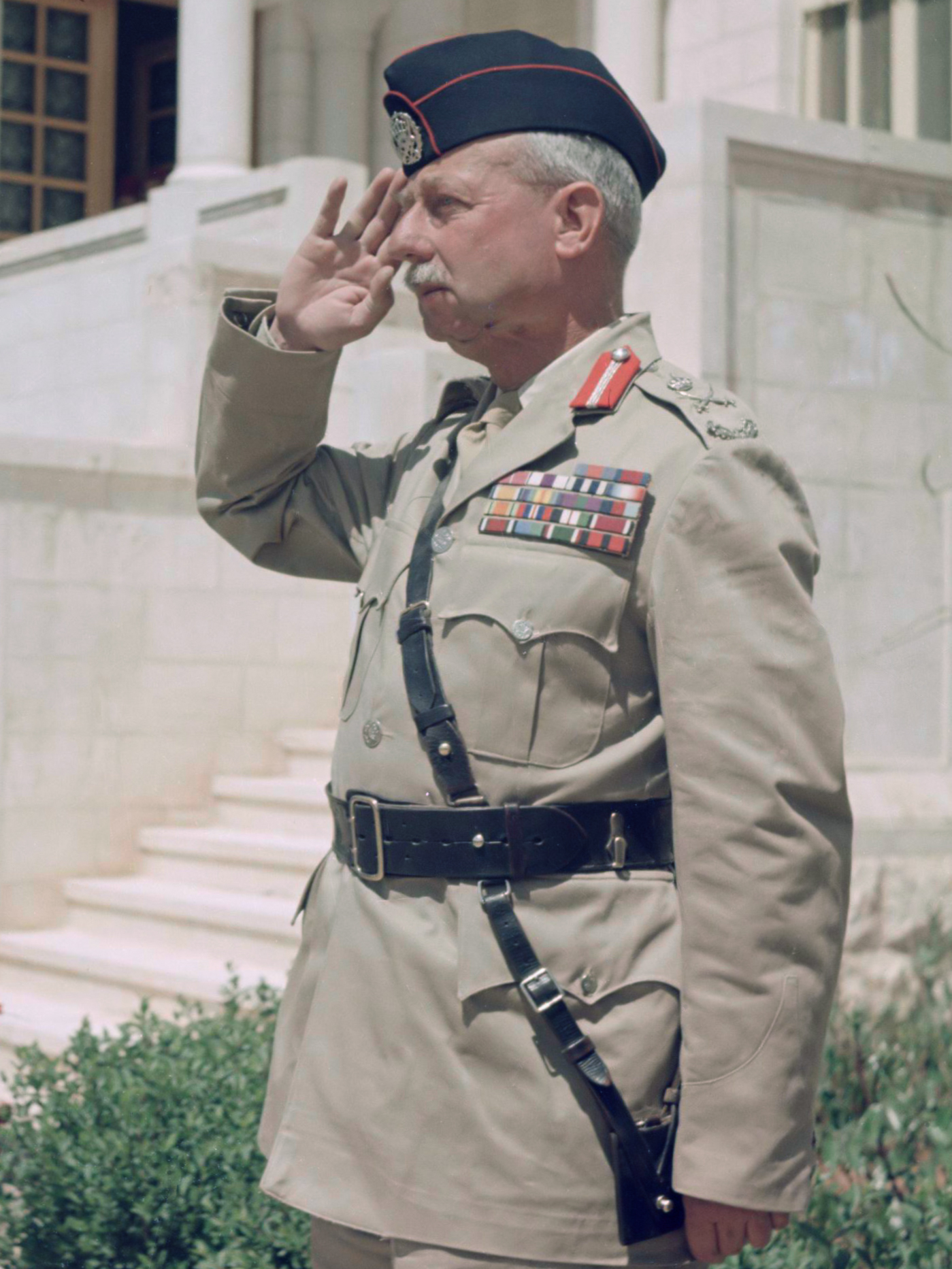
John Bagot Glubb

- 1 March – Tommy Farr, Welsh boxer (born 1913)
- 4 March
  - Edward MacLysaght, British-born Irish genealogist (born 1887)
  - John Spence, Conservative politician (born 1920)
- 5 March – Basil McFarland, Northern Irish politician and businessman (born 1898)
- 6 March – Robert Bateson, RAF air marshal (born 1912)
- 10 March
  - E. Gwyndaf Evans, Welsh poet (born 1913)
  - Ray Milland, actor (born 1907)
  - Elizabeth Monroe, historian (born 1905)
- 12 March – James Maurice Scott, explorer and writer (born 1906)
- 14 March
  - John Fulton, Baron Fulton, civil servant (born 1902)
  - Audrey Williamson, theatre critic (born 1913)
- 15 March – Martin Cooper, musicologist (born 1910)
- 16 March
  - George Jackson, film animator (born 1921)
  - Sir John Nicholson, 3rd Baronet, surgeon (born 1904)
  - Sir Ouvry Lindfield Roberts, Army general (born 1898)
- 17 March – Sir John Bagot Glubb, general and author, leader of the Arab Legion (1939–1956) (born 1897)
- 19 March
  - Elisabeth Barker, journalist and civil servant (born 1910)
  - Phil Rees, greyhound trainer (born 1914)
- 22 March – Jimmy Jones, tennis player (born 1912)
- 21 March – Derek Farr, actor (born 1912)
- 23 March – Sir Walter Merton, RAF air marshal (born 1905)
- 26 March – Andrew Freeth, artist (born 1912)
- 29 March – Elizabeth Williams, educationist (born 1895)
- 30 March – Beatrice White, scholar (born 1902)
- 31 March – Christopher Lloyd, naval historian (born 1906)

=== April ===
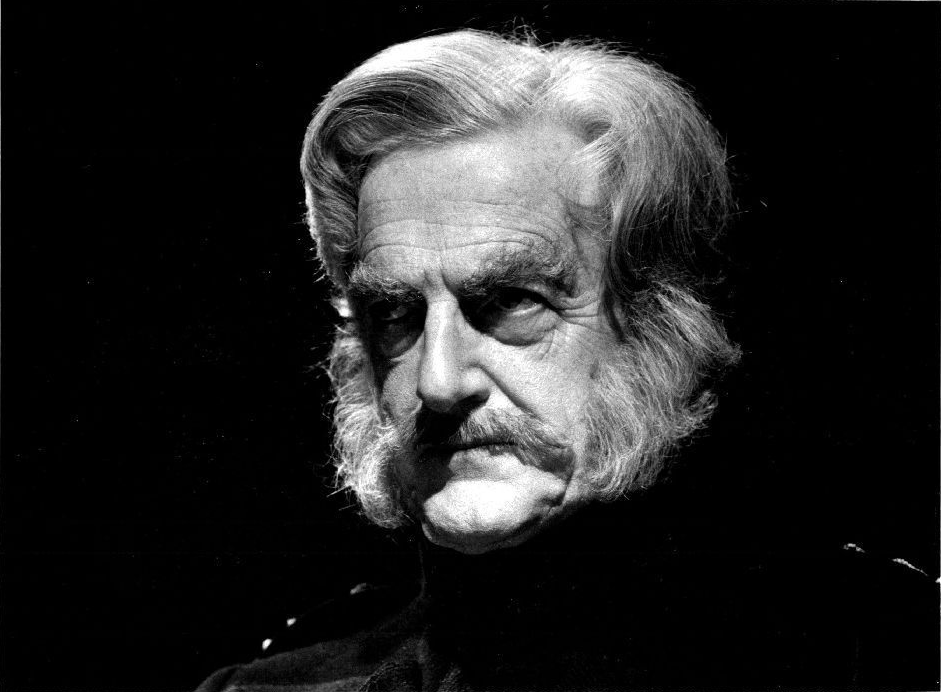
Peter Pears

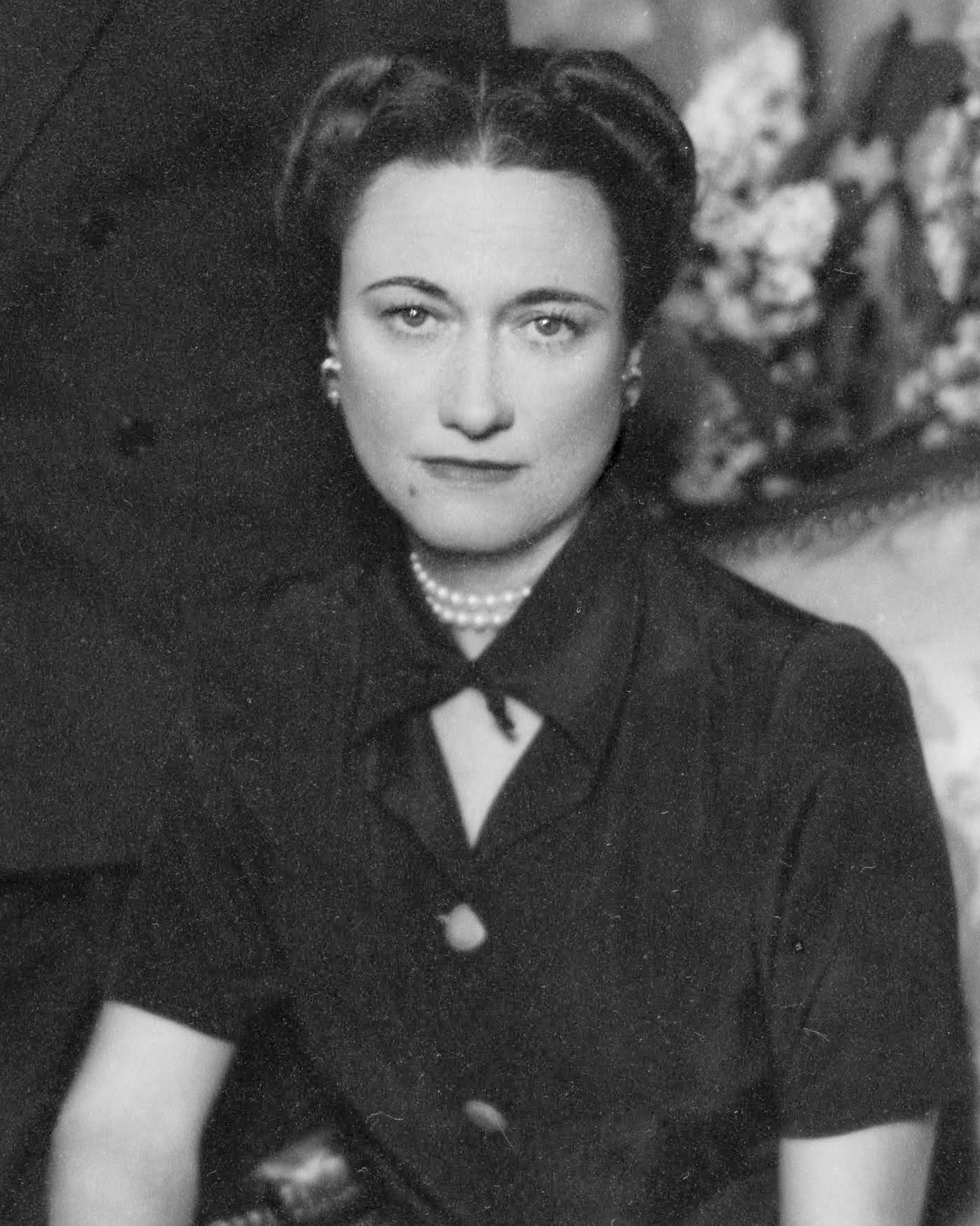
Wallis, Duchess of Windsor

- 1 April – Margaret Masterman, linguist (born 1910)
- 3 April – Peter Pears, tenor (born 1910)
- 7 April – William Homan Thorpe, zoologist (born 1902)
- 11 April
  - Lady Penelope Betjeman, travel writer and wife of Sir John Betjeman (born 1910)
  - Sir Ronald Gould, trade unionist (born 1904)
  - Ethel Haythornthwaite, environmental campaigner (born 1894)
- 15 April – Sir Edmund Hakewill-Smith, Army major-general (born 1896)
- 17 April – George Baillie-Hamilton, 12th Earl of Haddington, peer (born 1894)
- 19 April – James Carne, Army colonel (born 1906)
- 23 April
  - Sir Charles Johnston, diplomat and translator (born 1912)
  - Jim Laker, cricketer (born 1922)
- 24 April – Wallis, Duchess of Windsor (born 1896)
- 25 April – Sir Michael Creswell, diplomat (born 1929)
- 26 April
  - Bessie Love, actress (born 1898, United States)
  - Richard Ernest Wycherley, archaeologist (born 1909)
- 28 April – Denis Arnold, musicologist (born 1926)
- 29 April – Glen Byam Shaw, actor and theatre director (born 1904)
- 30 April – Robert Stevenson, filmmaker (born 1905)

=== May ===
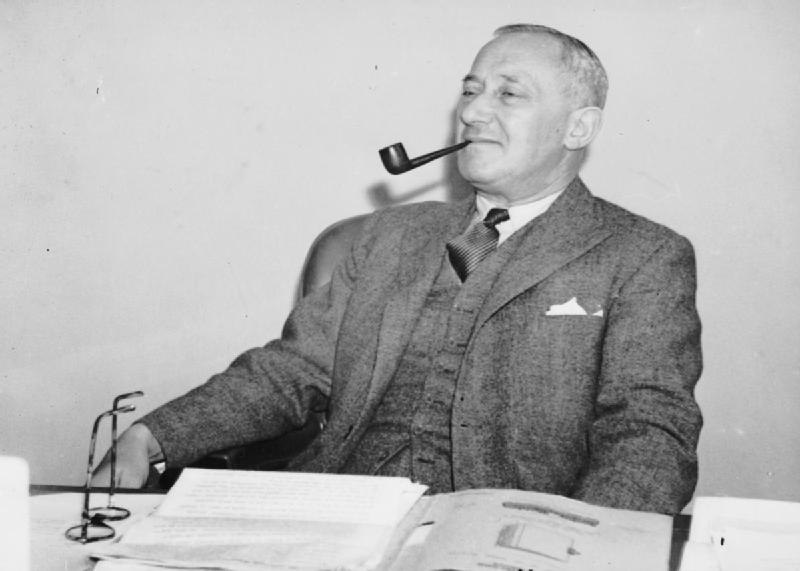
Manny Shinwell, Baron Shinwell

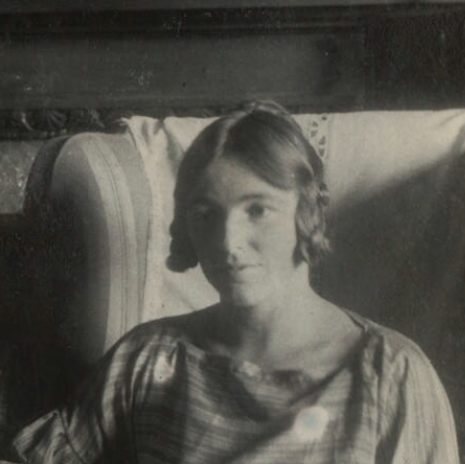
Dora Russell

- 1 May
  - Hylda Baker, actress (born 1905)
  - Alastair McIntyre, film editor (born 1927)
- 4 May – C. H. V. Sutherland, numismatist (born 1908)
- 8 May
  - Ernle Bradford, historian (born 1922)
  - Manny Shinwell, Baron Shinwell, trade union official and Labour MP (born 1884)
  - Sir Arthur Peterson, civil servant (born 1916)
- 14 May – William Lindsay, actor (born 1945)
- 18 May
  - Robert Page Arnot, Communist journalist and politician (born 1890)
  - James Phemister, geologist (born 1893)
- 21 May – Kenny Carter, motorcycle racer (born 1961; suicide)
- 23 May – Edward Hart, paediatrician (born 1911)
- 24 May – Robert Holmes, television scriptwriter (born 1926)
- 25 May
  - Owen Hood Phillips, lawyer (born 1907)
  - John Verney, 20th Baron Willoughby de Broke, peer (born 1896)
- 26 May
  - Peggy Ann Clifford, actress (born 1921)
  - Harold W. Fisher, philatelist (born 1903)
- 31 May – Dora Russell, author and campaigner, second wife of Bertrand Russell (born 1894)

=== June ===
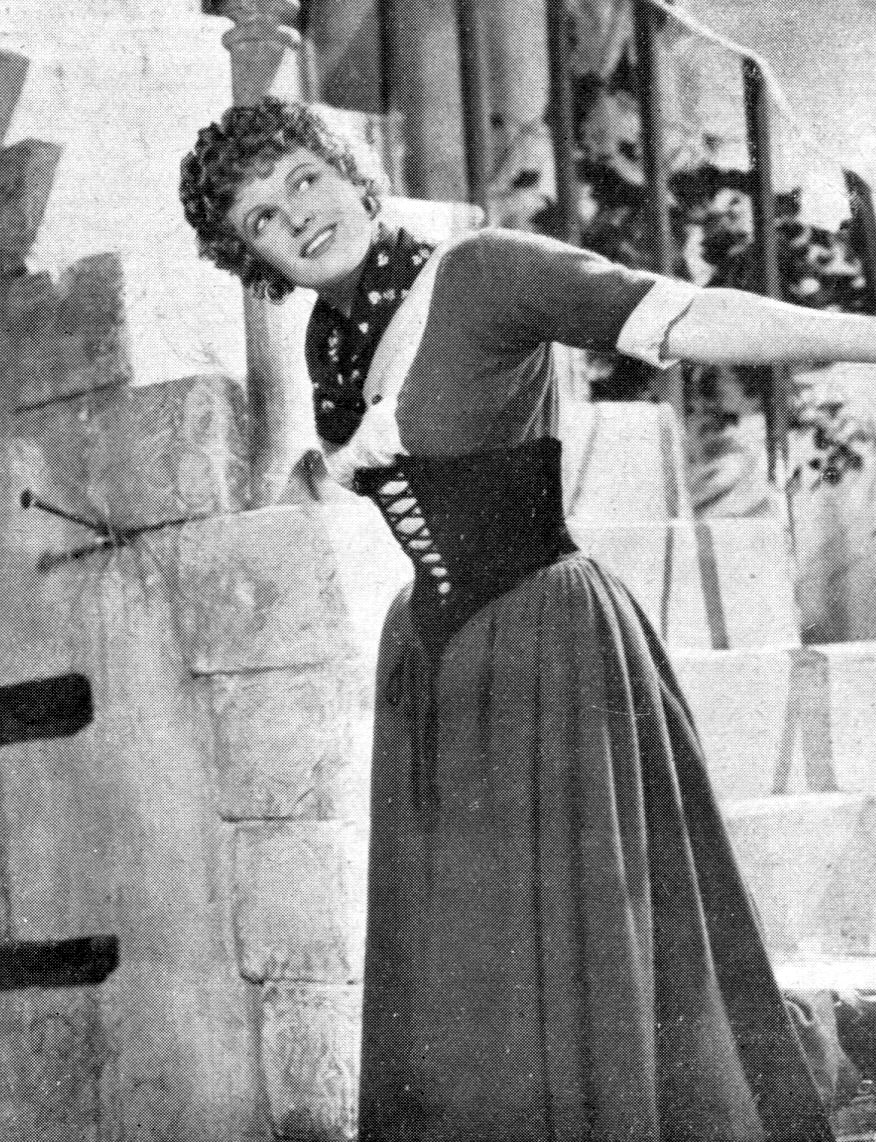
Anna Neagle

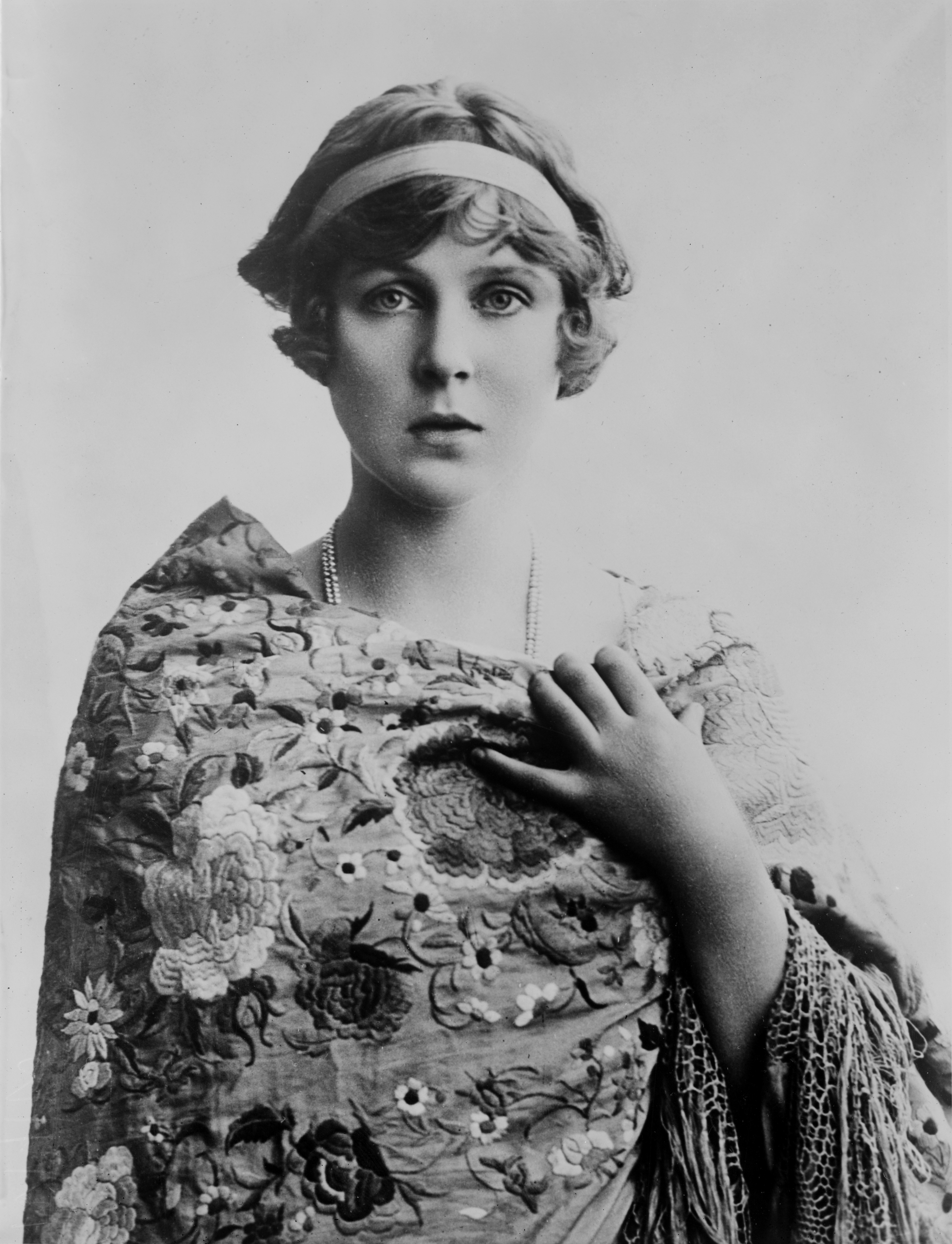
Lady Diana Cooper

- 2 June – Jimmy Grafton, radio and television producer (born 1916)
- 3 June
  - Dame Anna Neagle, actress (born 1904)
  - John Gilmour, botanist (born 1906)
- 4 June – Helen Gardner, literary critic (born 1908)
- 6 June
  - Dick Rowe, record producer (born 1921)
  - Tony Wright, actor (born 1925)
- 8 June – Thomas Burrow, Indologist (born 1909)
- 10 June – Reginald Lawson Waterfield, astronomer (born 1900)
- 11 June – Frank Cousins, Labour politician (born 1904)
- 12 June – John Steven Watson, historian (born 1916)
- 16 June – Lady Diana Cooper, aristocrat and actress (born 1892)
- 17 June – Joseph Stone, Baron Stone, physician (born 1903)
- 19 June – John Buxton Hilton, crime writer (born 1921)
- 23 June
  - Sir Moses Finley, classical scholar (born 1912 in the United States)
  - Charles Ritchie Russell, Baron Russell of Killowen, judge (born 1908)
  - Nigel Stock, actor (born 1919)
- 24 June – George Howe, actor (born 1900)
- 25 June
  - Laurie Fishlock, cricketer and footballer (born 1907)
  - Dame Mary Welsh, airwoman (born 1896)
- 26 June – William Lovelock, composer (born 1899)
- 29 June
  - Sir Desmond Pond, psychiatrist (born 1919)
  - Kenyon Taylor, inventor (born 1908)
  - Cliff Townshend, jazz musician (born 1916)

=== July ===
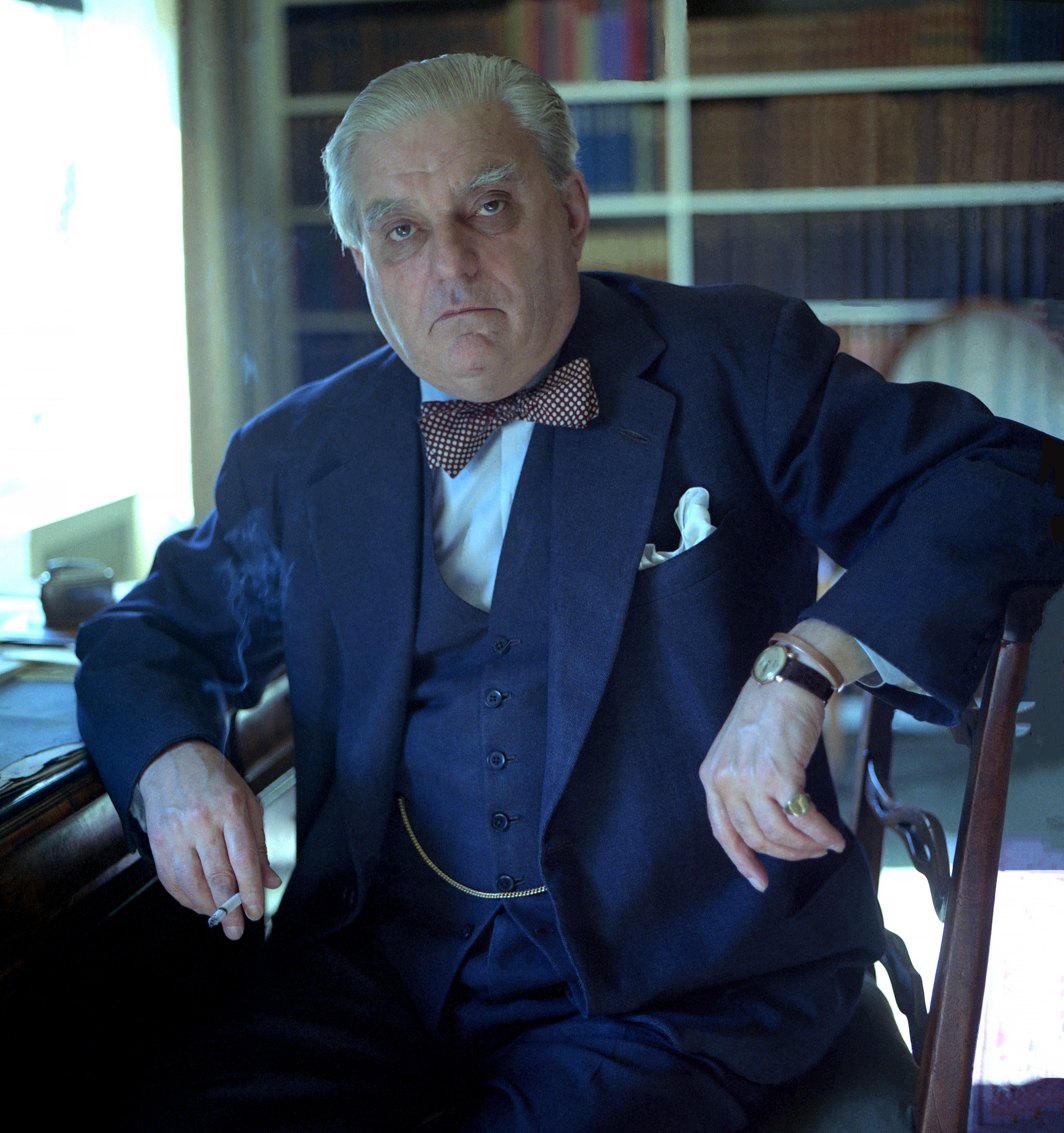
Robert Boothby, Baron Boothby

- 1 July
  - E. E. Y. Hales, historian (born 1908)
  - Iain Sutherland, diplomat (born 1925)
  - Roger Cuthbert Wakefield, surveyor (born 1906)
- 5 July – Sir John Toothill, industrialist (born 1908)
- 9 July – Sir Percy Edward Kent, geologist (born 1913)
- 12 July – Dermod MacCarthy, paediatrician (born 1911)
- 16 July
  - Robert Boothby, Baron Boothby, Conservative politician (born 1900)
  - Stephen Coulter, novelist (born 1914)
  - Dick Crawshaw, Baron Crawshaw of Aintree, politician (born 1917)
- 18 July – Sir Stanley Rous, president of FIFA and former secretary of the Football Association (born 1894)
- 23 July – Bryan Matthews, physiologist (born 1906)
- 25 July – John Coldham, cricketer and coach (born 1901)
- 27 July – Sir Osbert Lancaster, cartoonist (born 1908)
- 28 July – Sir Frank Simpson, Army general (born 1899)
- 29 July
  - Richard David Barnett, archaeologist (born 1909)
  - Gordon Mills, musician and songwriter (born 1935)
- 30 July – Sir Clarence Bird, Army lieutenant-general, oldest British general of World War II (born 1885)
- 31 July
  - Diana King, actress (born 1918)
  - Harold Woolley, Baron Woolley, farmer (born 1905)

=== August ===
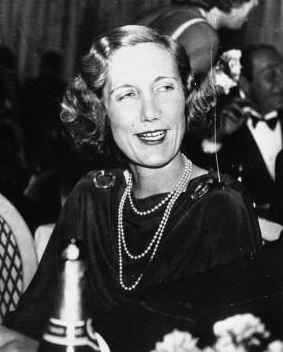
Beryl Markham

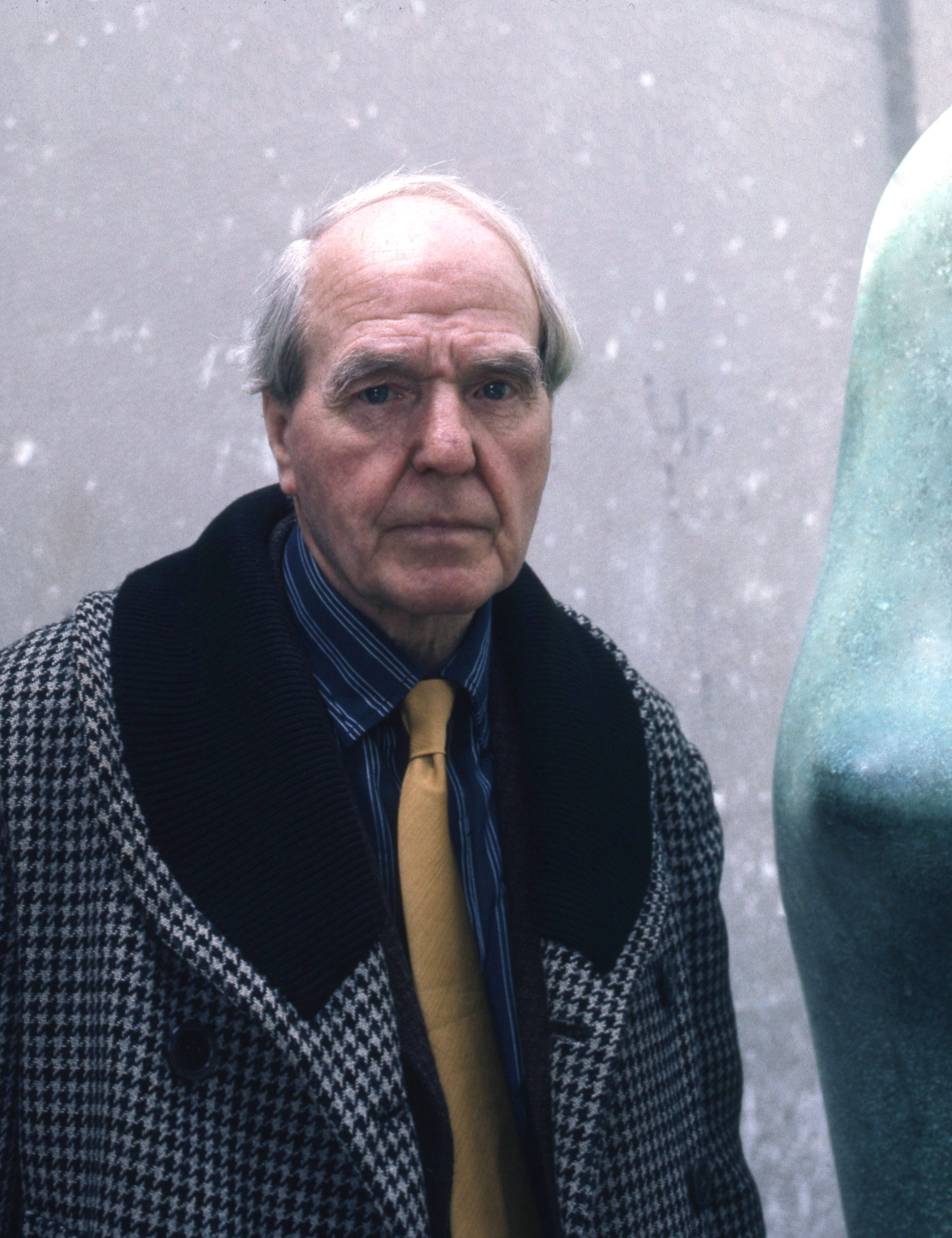
Henry Moore

- 1 August
  - Susan Jellicoe, gardener and garden designer (born 1907)
  - Lena Kennedy, novelist (born 1914)
- 3 August – Beryl Markham, British-born Kenyan pilot and author (born 1902)
- 9 August – Cyril Plant, trade unionist (born 1910)
- 12 August – Dame Adelaide Doughty, civil servant (born 1908, Australia)
- 15 August – John Trevelyan, film censor (born 1903)
- 16 August – Sonia Rosemary Keppel, socialite and grandmother of Queen Camilla (born 1900)
- 17 August – Sir Charles Loewen, Army general (born 1900, Canada)
- 18 August – Vivian Stuart, author (born 1914)
- 19 August
  - Hermione Baddeley, actress (born 1906)
  - Wilfred Beaver, World War I air ace (born 1897)
  - James Broom Millar, media executive (born 1909)
- 21 August – Samuel Crooks, Northern Irish Anglican prelate (born 1920)
- 25 August
  - Walter John Christie, civil servant in India (born 1905)
  - Henry Neville Southern, ornithologist (born 1908)
- 26 August – Elsie M. Burrows, botanist and phycologist (born 1913)
- 29 August – Stuart Young, accountant (born 1934)
- 31 August – Henry Moore, sculptor (born 1898)

=== September ===
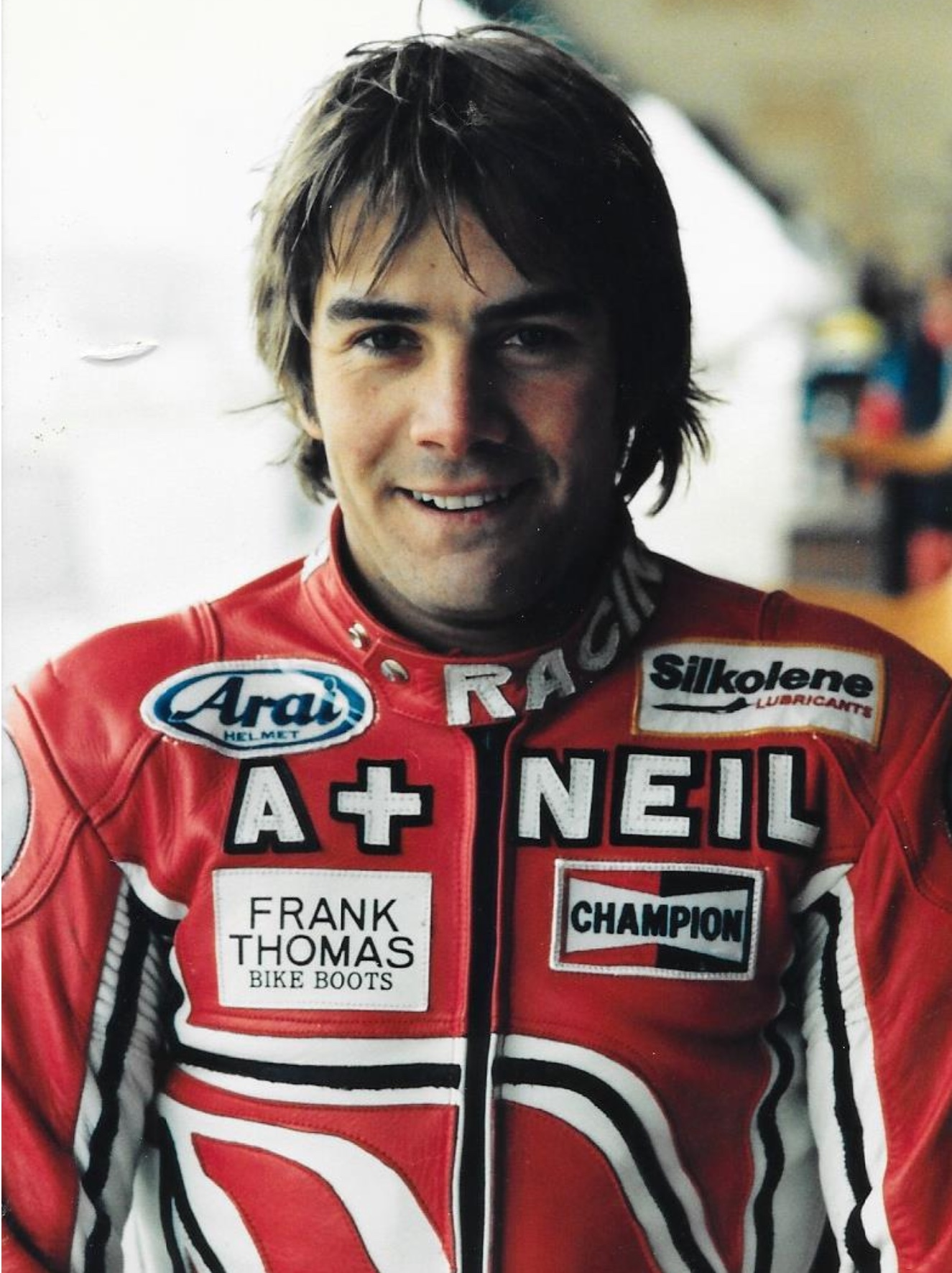
Neil Robinson

- 1 September
  - Tina Cooper, paediatrician (born 1918)
  - R. B. Freeman, zoologist (born 1915)
- 2 September
  - Philip Herries Gregory, mycologist (born 1907)
  - Philip Radcliffe, composer (born 1905)
- 3 September – Horace King, Baron Maybray-King, Labour politician (born 1901)
- 6 September – Fred Taggart, golfer (born 1906)
- 9 September – Robert Shackleton, philologist and librarian (born 1919)
- 10 September – Ronnie Shade, Scottish golfer (born 1938)
- 11 September – Noel Streatfeild, children's author (born 1895)
- 12 September
  - Philip Ingress Bell, judge and Conservative politician (born 1900)
  - Terence MacDonagh, oboist (born 1908)
  - Harold Moody, athlete (born 1913)
- 13 September – Neil Robinson, Northern Irish motorcycle racer (born 1962; accident while training)
- 15 September – William Goode, colonial administrator (born 1907)
- 17 September – Pat Phoenix, actress (born 1923)
- 18 September – Elwyn Davies, Welsh civil servant (born 1908)
- 20 September – Dennis Spooner, television scriptwriter (born 1932)
- 22 September – Janet Davies, actress (born 1927)
- 23 September – Vincent Lloyd-Jones, Welsh judge (born 1901)
- 24 September – Prudence Glynn, fashion designer (born 1935)
- 28 September – Denis Carey, actor (born 1909)
- 29 September – Sir Reg Goodwin, Labour politician (born 1902)

=== October ===
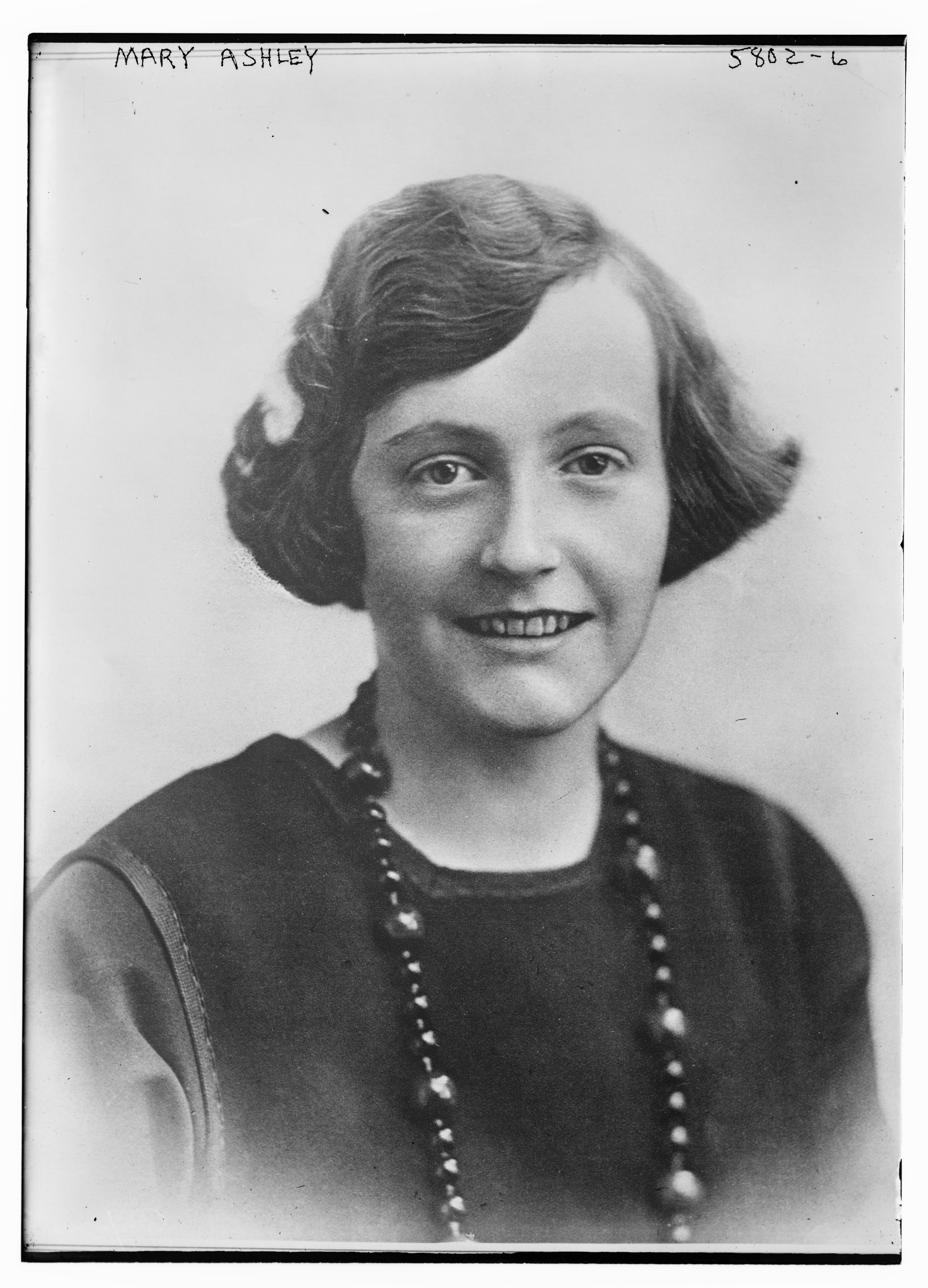
Mary Cholmondeley, Lady Delamere

- 3 October – Terry Pitt, political advisor (born 1937)
- 5 October
  - Timothy Creasey, Army general (born 1922)
  - Mairin Mitchell, journalist, author and translator (born 1895)
  - James H. Wilkinson, mathematician (born 1919)
- 10 October – Mary Cholmondeley, Lady Delamere, socialite (born 1906)
- 11 October – John Crockett, television director (born 1918)
- 13 October
  - Maidie Andrews, actress (born 1893)
  - Eunice Crowther, singer, dancer and choreographer (born 1916)
- 15 October – Marcus Samuel, 3rd Viscount Bearsted, peer and executive (born 1909)
- 16 October
  - Jeanne MacKenzie, author (born 1922)
  - Hugh Austin Windle Pilkington, philanthropist (born 1942)
  - Ted Sagar, footballer (born 1910)
- 18 October
  - Billy Bennington, dulcimer player (born 1900)
  - Alan Little, sociologist (born 1934)
- 23 October
  - Ronald Long, actor (born 1911)
  - Conrad O'Brien-ffrench, Secret Intelligence officer (born 1893)
- 27 October – Alan Branscombe, jazz musician (born 1936)
- 28 October
  - John Braine, novelist (born 1922)
  - Sir Richard Elton Goodwin, Army officer (born 1908)
  - Ian Marter, actor and writer (born 1944)

=== November ===
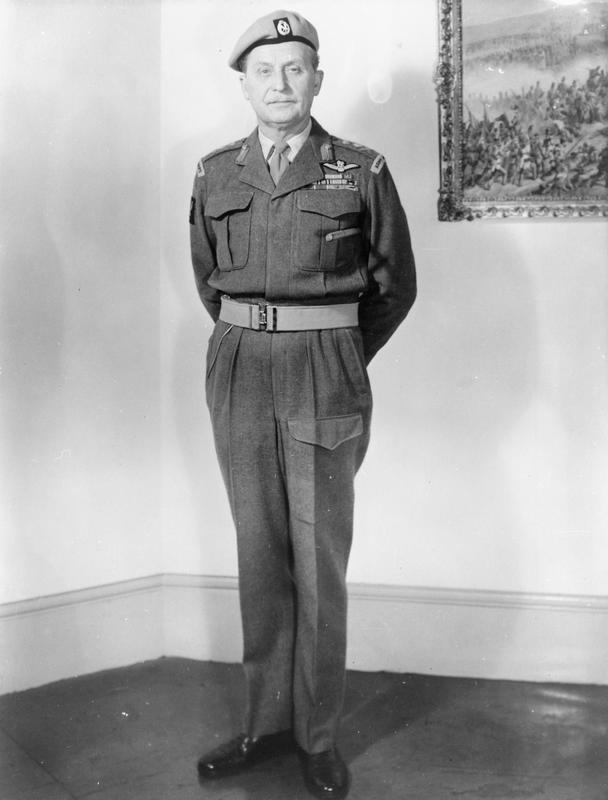
Hugh Stockwell

- 3 November – Sir William Lawrence, 4th Baronet, businessman (born 1913)
- 4 November – John Kelsall, composer (born 1947)
- 6 November – Howard Thomas, Welsh radio producer (born 1909)
- 7 November – Sir Dugald Baird, physician (born 1899)
- 8 November – Harry W. Holmes, Esperantist (born 1896)
- 10 November
  - Alan Kennington, novelist (born 1906)
  - Mark Lubbock, composer (born 1898)
- 11 November – Reginald Brettauer Fisher, biochemist (born 1907)
- 14 November – Arthur Duckworth, Conservative politician (born 1901)
- 17 November – Billy McLean, Scottish Conservative politician (born 1918)
- 19 November – Billy Dainty, actor, comedian and dancer (born 1927)
- 22 November – Malcolm Nokes, Olympic athlete (born 1897)
- 23 November
  - Crawford Fairbrother, Scottish athlete (born 1936)
  - Derek Hart, actor and radio presenter (born 1925)
- 27 November
  - L. Harrison Matthews, zoologist (born 1901)
  - Sir Hugh Stockwell, Army general in the Suez Crisis (born 1903)
- 29 November
  - Ronald Baddiley, actor (born 1922)
  - Cary Grant, actor (born 1904)

=== December ===
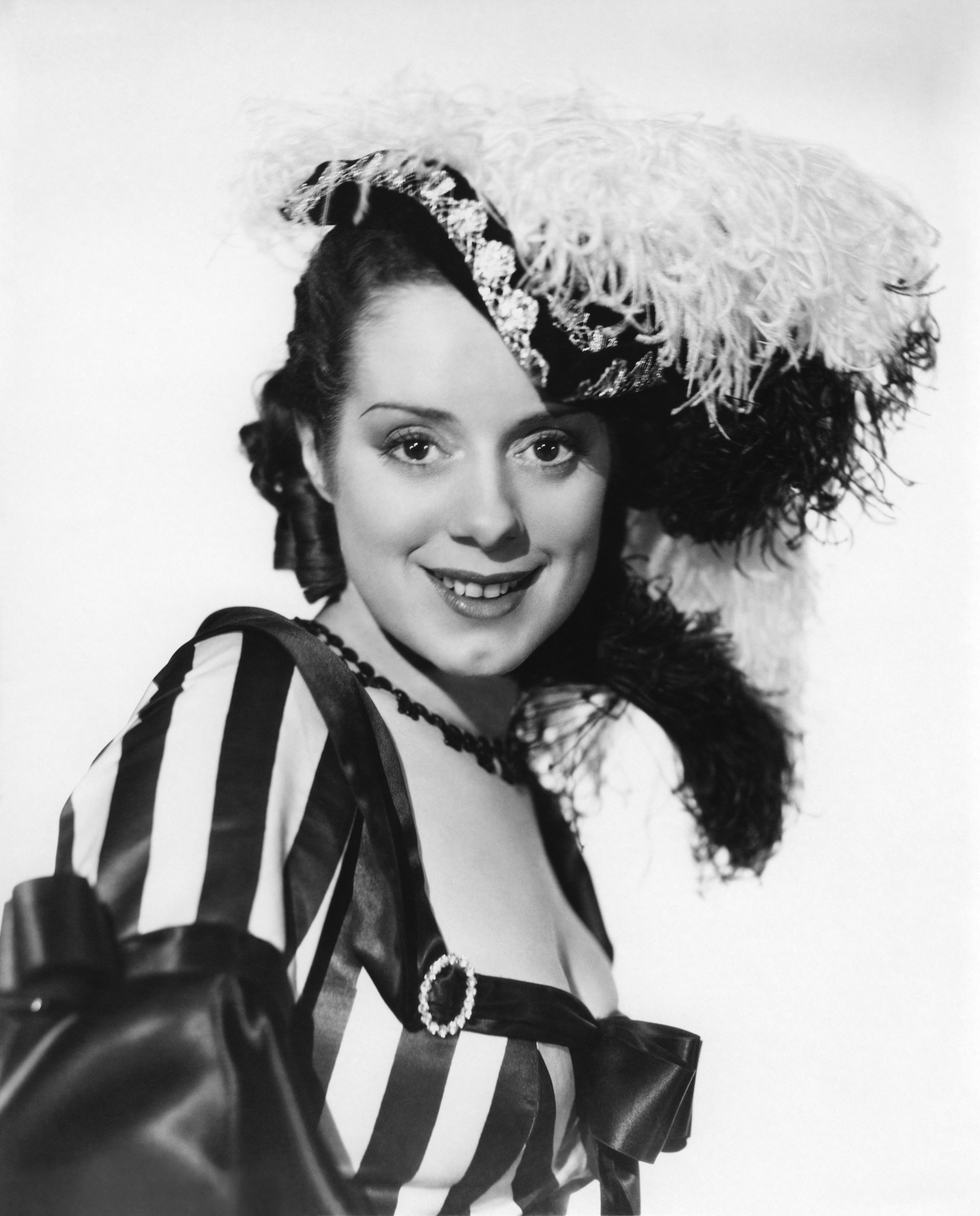
Elsa Lanchester

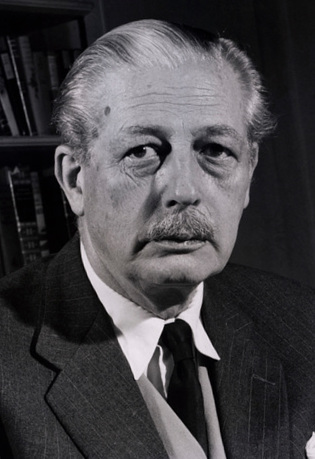
Harold Macmillan

- 1 December – Robert Lee, actor (born 1913, China)
- 4 December – H. de C. Hastings, architect (born 1902)
- 7 December – Sir Terence Garvey, diplomat (born 1915)
- 8 December – John Melville, artist (born 1902)
- 10 December – Kenneth Hyde, historian (born 1930)
- 11 December – Geoffrey S. S. Ludford, mathematician (born 1928)
- 13 December
  - Heather Angel, actress (born 1909)
  - Glyn Daniel, Welsh archaeologist (born 1914)
- 15 December – David James, Conservative politician (born 1919)
- 17 December
  - J. F. Hendry, poet (born 1912)
  - Leonard Rochford, World War I air ace (born 1896)
- 18 December – James Smith, anaesthetist (born 1917)
- 19 December
  - Verona Conway, botanist (born 1910)
  - Archibald Gordon MacGregor, geologist (born 1894, Canada)
- 20 December
  - Alexander Isserlis, civil servant (born 1922)
  - Sir Harry Platt, surgeon (born 1886)
- 21 December
  - Gilbert Laithwaite, diplomat (born 1894)
  - Bill Simpson, actor (born 1931)
- 22 December – David Penhaligon, Liberal MP (car accident) (born 1944)
- 24 December
  - Guy Barnett, Labour politician (born 1928)
  - Sir Eric Malcolm Jones, intelligence officer (born 1907)
  - Arnold Kettle, literary critic (born 1916)
- 26 December – Elsa Lanchester, actress (born 1902)
- 27 December – George Dangerfield, historian (born 1904)
- 29 December – Harold Macmillan, former Prime Minister (born 1894)
- 31 December – Sir Geoffrey Audley Miles, senior Royal Navy admiral and veteran of both world wars (born 1890)

=== Date Unknown ===
- Robina Addis, psychiatric social worker (died 1986)

== See also ==
- 1986 in British music
- 1986 in British television
- List of British films of 1986
