= Mario Pirovano =

- Born: 20 April 1950 (age 76); Milan, Italy
- Occupations: Theatrical actor and storyteller, translator
- Website: http://www.mariopirovano.it/

Mario Pirovano (born 20 April 1950) is an Italian theatre actor, translator and interpreter of Dario Fo monologues.

== Biography ==
Mario Pirovano grew up in Pregnana Milanese, a village just outside Milan. His father was a shoemaker and his mother a factory worker. At the age of 12, he worked in a shop and at 24 he moved to England, where he lived and worked for a decade. In 1983, he met Dario Fo and Franca Rame at a performance of Mistero Buffo at the Riverside Studios in London, an experience which inspired him to begin working in the theatre himself. Pirovano has been married twice; he now lives in Umbria and has two children.

=== Theatre ===
After meeting with Dario Fo and Franca Rame, Pirovano joined their acting company as a translator, walk-on performer, electrical assistant, stagehand, editorial material distribution manager, stage manager and assistant director. In the subsequent years, he followed the two actors on their international tours while collaborating with their son Jacopo Fo at the Free University of Alcatraz in Gubbio. After many years of working with, for and under the two actors, he became well-versed in their texts and acting rules. In 1992 he debuted his solo show, 'Mistero Buffo'.

Both in Italy and abroad, he has performed some of the most famous Dario Fo monologues. Besides Fo's plays, he has performed some texts from other authors: in 2001, he performed 'Vino divino' by Marco Paoli, in 2003, Le jeu de Robin et Marion by Adam de la Halle, and in 2005, The pope cowboy: life, adventures and battles of Julius II by Marco Ghelardi. More recently, he has been performing choice verses from contemporary poets.

==== Translations ====
After the adaptation from classical French to Italian of Adam de La Halle's Le jeu de Robert et Marion, he began translating two of Fo's texts: in 2002, Johan Padan a la descoverta de le Americhe (Johan Padan and the Discovery of the Americas) and in 2009, Lu Santo Jullare Françesco (Francis the Holy Jester). Both texts were originally composed in a particular language, a mixture of dialects from Padania and certain expressions, sounds and neologisms which are specific characteristics of Fo's monologues. In 2009, Fo's text on Saint Francis was published by Beautiful Books.

In 2011, Pirovano translated an unreleased text by Dario Fo and Jacopo Fo called La ballata di John Horse (“The Ballad of John Horse”), based on the victorious rebellion of the American Indian tribe, the Seminoles.

He has also translated into English four works from the Renaissance playwright Angelo Beolco called Ruzante, based on the rewriting of the texts by Dario Fo and presented them in Portugal during the European Union Grundtvig programme.

==== Plays in English and Spanish ====
Under the patronage of the Italian Cultural Institute and the Dante Alighieri Society, Pirovano performs Dario Fo's most famous monologues all around the world. In the 1998-2003 editions of the Festival ‘Un puente, dos culturas’ in Argentina he performed Johan Padan en el Descubrimiento de las Américas. Also in 2003, Pirovano performed the Mistero Buffo (Misterio Bufo) in Spanish for the Festival of the Commedia dell'arte in Alcalà Henarez, Spain. In 2002, he recited in English Johan Padan and the Discovery of America at Riverside Studios in London and then, in 2003, in Australia. In 2004, he performed the same play in Canada and, in 2005, in France, then in Greece and finally in Hong Kong. In 2006, he took the Spanish version of Johan Padan to Venezuela and in 2008 to Colombia.

In 2009, he toured England with the English version of Francis the Holy Jester performing the play at the Edinburgh Fringe Festival, where he received high praise from critics.

In the two years following, Pirovano promoted "Francis the Holy Jester" in Palestine, in Pakistan, Ethiopia, Kenya, England and Ireland.

In 2012, he performed Francis the Holy Jester in Sweden and Norway, then in the US, on an invitation from St. Bonaventure University, the oldest Franciscan community in the US. The American tour included theaters and Universities like Princeton and Harvard. Since 2012, he has continued to perform widely and conduct theatre workshops around Europe, particularly in Portugal, the United Kingdom and Belgium.

=== Television and cinema ===
In 1988, he acted in a recurring role in all of the episodes in Trasmissione Forzata, a RAI3 adaptation written and directed by Dario Fo.

He appeared in the 1991 thriller by Alfonso Brescia titled Omicidio a luci blu.

=== Didactic work ===
Aside from acting, Pirovano conducts many seminars and workshops in national and international theatres, schools and Universities, including in Islamabad, Nairobi, Free University of Alcatraz in Gubbio (Italy), Tavira (Portugal), Hoga Kusten (Sweden), and Rochester, New York (USA).

== Bibliography ==
- Marco Fazzini, a cura di, Canto un mondo libero, Edizioni ETS, 2012, pag.247
- Maggie Rose, Sogni e incubi della ragione. Edimburgo, Hystrio, n.4, dicembre 2009, pag. 8
- Mario Pirovano, La mia Umbria, Valley Life, n. 47, settembre 2008, pag. 28–31
- Luca Pagni, Mario Pirovano: attore di studio, Eventi culturali, febbraio 2007, pag. 90–91
- Tiziana Voarino, Giulio II: protagonista in teatro di un pezzo di storia, PrimaFila, n.104, marzo 2004, pag. 59
- Silvia Mastagni, Arezzo: luoghi nuovi per un teatro nuovo. Il teatro e il sacro tra cripte e castelli, Hystrio, n. 4, dicembre 1993, pag. 37
- Maria Pia Damiani, L’attore, Trend professioni, n. 9, ottobre 1992, pag. 12-13

== Related entries ==
- Dario Fo
- Franca Rame
- Jacopo Fo
