= 1997 Nobel Prize in Literature =

- Dario Fo
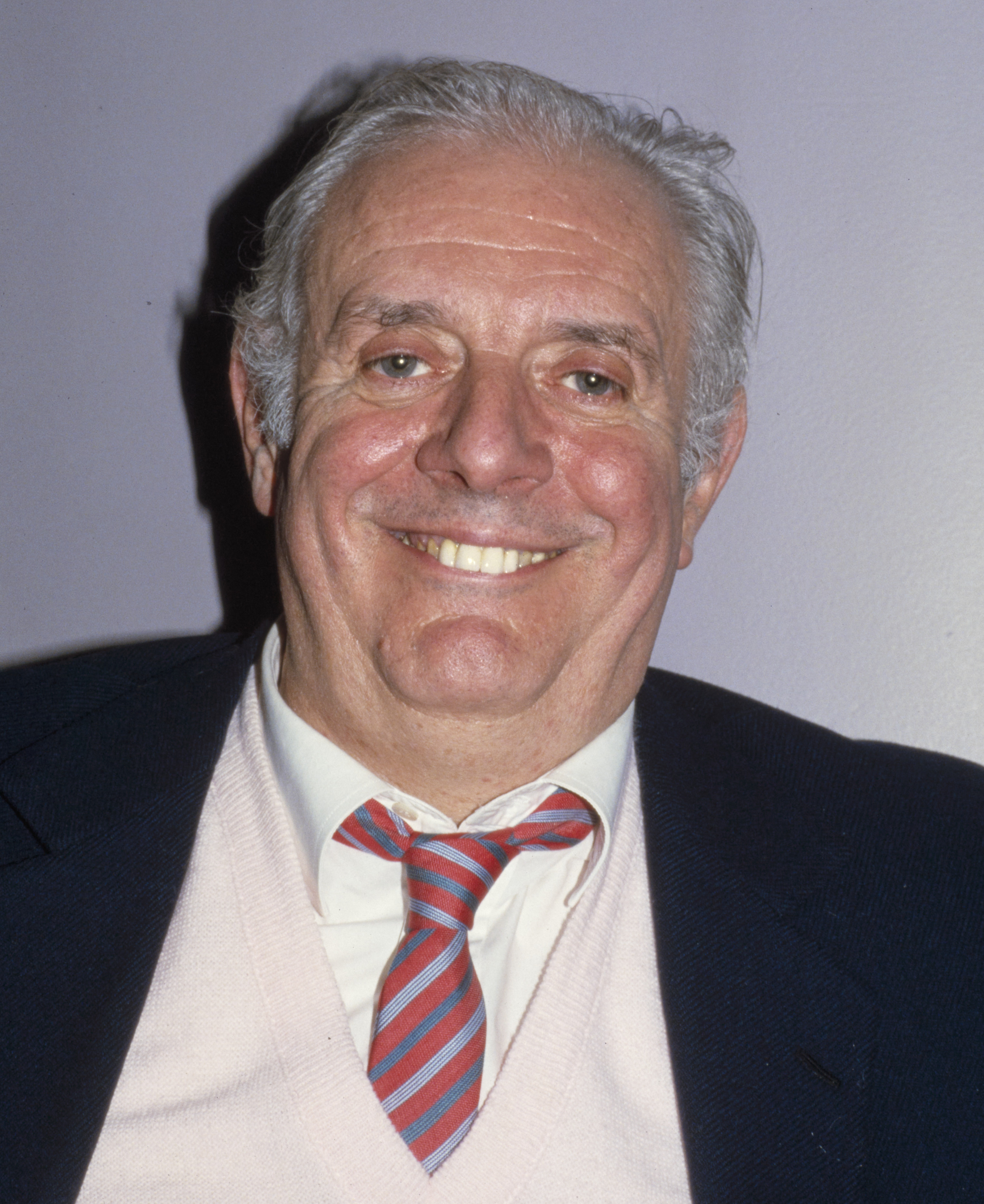
- "who emulates the jesters of the Middle Ages in scourging authority and upholding the dignity of the downtrodden."
- Date: 9 October 1997 (announcement); 10 December 1997 (ceremony)
- Location: Stockholm, Sweden
- Presented by: Swedish Academy
- First award: 1901
- Website: Official website

The 1997 Nobel Prize in Literature was awarded to the Italian playwright and actor Dario Fo (1926–2016) "who emulates the jesters of the Middle Ages in scourging authority and upholding the dignity of the downtrodden." Fo became the sixth Italian to be selected for the award since Eugenio Montale in 1975 and the first Italian playwright to be chosen since Luigi Pirandello in 1934.

== Laureate ==
Dario Fo is one of modern political theater's leading figures whose works are based on medieval farce and the buffoonery of commedia dell'arte, and which were performed not only in the theater, but also in parks, prisons and schools. Fo was embroiled in many controversies in his native Italy – with the government, the police and the Catholic Church. His most performed plays include Morte accidentale di un anarchico ("Accidental Death of an Anarchist", 1970), Non Si Paga! Non Si Paga! ("Can't Pay? Won't Pay!", 1974), Coppia aperta ("The Open Couple", 1983), and Il Papa e la strega ("The Pope and the Witch", 1989).

== Reactions ==
On 9 October 1997, Fo, driving along the Rome-Milan motorway at the time of the announcement, was alerted to the news when a car drew up alongside his with an enormous placard in the window exclaiming "Dario, you've won the Nobel prize!" 20-year-old TV star Ambra Angiolini was alongside him in the car recording an interview, so Fo's initial reaction was captured on film.

The announcement came as a shock to Italians and non-Italians alike. Umberto Eco expressed delight that the award had been given to someone who "does not belong to the traditional academic world." However, 86-year-old Italian literary critic Carlo Bo was mystified: "I must be too old to understand. What does this mean? That everything changes, even literature has changed." Fo's fellow Italian laureate Rita Levi-Montalcini expressed bewilderment when asked for her thoughts and wondered if Fo were Italian. Mario Luzi, a poet regarded as a likely next Italian recipient at the time, slammed the phone down on one reporter: "I'll say only this. I've just about had it up to here!"

Reaction from the English-speaking world was also particularly fierce, with representatives from many English-speaking countries regarding Fo's work as unfashionable and outdated, belonging to the 1970s and 1980s. U.S. playwright Tony Kushner, however, expressed his approval, writing: "[Fo] has dedicated his genius to making everything he touches debatable. [It] is brave and perhaps even reckless because it subjects Literature, and prizes, and Newspapers of Record, to the Fo effect". The Roman Catholic Church, having previously censured Fo's plays which are described initially by some critics as "rather lightweight", also criticized the academy's decision to bestow him the prize. Salman Rushdie and Arthur Miller had been favoured to receive the prize, but a committee member was later quoted as saying that they would have been "too predictable, too popular."

When he accepted the award, Fo presented a specially devised piece called Contra jogulatores obloquentes (Against Jesters of Irreverent Speech) alongside some paintings, with this later being described as "undoubtedly the most flamboyantly theatrical and comical acceptance speech ever seen at the Swedish Academy."
