= Rodney Seaborn =

Australian psychiatrist and philanthropist

Rodney Seaborn AO, OBE
- Born: Rodney Frederick Marsden Seaborn; 1912
- Died: 17 May 2008 (aged 95–96)
- Known for: Patron of the performing arts

Rodney Frederick Marsden Seaborn AO OBE (1912 − 17 May 2008) was an Australian psychiatrist, businessman, and philanthropist in the performing arts sector. He was responsible for supporting many theatre companies and professionals in Sydney, and was an advocate of Australian theatre.

He was the founding president of the Seaborn, Broughton & Walford Foundation (SBW), and the Rodney Seaborn Playwrights Award was established in 2000 funded by him and continued by a dedicated trust fund.

== Early life and education ==
Rodney Frederick Marsden Seaborn was born in 1912. His parents were Leslie, a solicitor and amateur actor, and Ethel Seaborn, a singer. His paternal great-grandfather, Hugh Seaborn, had migrated from England to Australia in 1850, becoming the first rector in Gundagai, New South Wales. His grandfather Frederick Seaborn, also a clergyman, married his grandmother Eliza Marsden, a relative of the Reverend Samuel Marsden. His mother Ethel's family was descended on one side from an early convict settler on the Third Fleet.

He grew up with a love of theatre. His maternal grandmother, Edith, often took him to the theatre as a child. The first play Rodney recalled seeing was a production of As You Like It when he was seven years old. He attended Edgecliff Preparatory School, and then boarding school at The King's School, where he had a comedic part in A Midsummer Night's Dream. Suffering from severe stagefright, however, he fell down and was unable to get back up.

His father was an alcoholic and died when Rodney was 19, which caused his mother to suffer depression. After leaving school, Seaborn worked at various jobs, setting up his own car hire and chauffeuring business, and working on a tobacco farm in Queensland belonging to an uncle.

He eventually enrolled for a law degree at University of Sydney, but later left for England, where he began studying medicine at the University of London in 1939. He was working as an intern at Charing Cross Hospital as the German Luftwaffe bombed London during the Blitz.

After the Second World War, Seaborn returned to Sydney to look after his mother and sister, Mollie, who was also unwell. He then returned to London with his mother, and studied psychiatry at Banstead Hospital in Surrey, where he treated many cases of what was then known as shell shock.

== Career in psychiatry ==
In the 1950s, Seaborn returned to Australia and worked extensively with returning servicemen at Concord Repatriation Hospital and Callan Park Mental Hospital. In 1955 he started a psychiatry practice in Macquarie Street, Sydney.

In 1956, Seaborn established a private psychiatric hospital, Alanbrook, in a large house Mosman, initially with five beds. After purchasing adjacent properties, the hospital had 63 beds, and specialised in the treatment of drug and alcohol dependence. He remained superintendent of Alanbrook until 1970.

In addition, Seaborn consulted at Sydney Hospital and lectured at the University of Sydney. He published various works about alcoholism and sat on national and international bodies, including vice-president of the International Council on Alcohol and Addictions in 1968. He was a patron of two major Australian alcohol and drug foundations after retirement.

He retired in his 70s and devoted the rest of his life to philanthropy.

== Property investments ==
Before beginning his studies, Seaborn made his first real estate investment, buying a block of land at Whale Beach well before it became fashionable.

In 1956 he bought Alanbrook for use as a psychiatric hospital.

Seaborn bought the Wattle Hotel, on Oxford Street in Darlinghurst in the 1970s or 1980s.

In 1986 he sold Alanbrook and bought the Stables Theatre in Kings Cross, home of Griffin Theatre Company, for the company. The Stables had been about to be demolished.

== Philanthropy ==
After purchasing The Stables, Seaborn to set up the Seaborn, Broughton & Walford Foundation (SBW), funded mostly by himself but including his cousins Peter Broughton and Leslie Walford and various friends. The Foundation later took ownership of The Stables. As of 2023 Walford is president of SBW.

Seaborn supported the development and production of David Wenham's one-man show, Dario Fo's The Tale of a Tiger, which he took to Berlin shortly after the fall of the Berlin Wall in November 1989.

In 1993, when the Elizabethan Theatre Trust faced financial problems, Seaborn purchased Independent Theatre in North Sydney. He established SB&W Friends of the Independent, and with the support of this group as well as the local council and wider community, the Independent was fully restored, and reopened in 1998. It was later sold to the Elizabethan Theatre Trust in 2004.

The foundation helps to support the Belvoir St Theatre, Bell Shakespeare, the Sydney Festival, the Australian National Playwrights' Centre, the Blue Mountains Festival, Performing Lines, and NIDA. The foundation funded the Rodney Seaborn Library at NIDA, along with the safekeeping of its valuable archives, known as the Seaborn, Broughton & Walford Foundation Archive, Library and Performing Arts Collection.

For some years before his death he worked on securing the future of the foundation, and was keen to ensure that his bequest continued to benefit the performing arts. To this end, he formed a partnership with NIDA around 2000.

== Awards ==
=== Rodney Seaborn Playwrights Award ===
The annual Rodney Seaborn Playwrights Award was established when NIDA entered into a partnership with SBW. The inaugural award went to Antony Waddington in 2000, to develop his adaptation of Patrick White's novel The Eye of the Storm.

The award is given for the development of an approved type of performing arts project, and provides financial assistance for playwrights while they are writing or developing the work. It may also assist with production costs, workshops, and other costs, and may be awarded to a single person or jointly, for example to writers, composers, designers, directors, and producers working on a project. It is funded by the Seaborn Trust, from Rodney Seaborn's estate, not the Foundation.

As of 2023 the trustees are:

- David Berthold, theatre director
- Ken Healey AM (former theatre reviewer, later teacher of playwriting at NIDA)
- Lee Lewis, theatre director

=== Other funding of awards ===
The Seaborn, Broughton & Walford Foundation was a major contributor to the annual Glugs Theatrical Awards, administered from 1973 until 2020 by a group of Sydney theatre-lovers known as The Glugs. This group's major award was named The Rodney Seaborn Memorial Lifetime Achievement Award (or Rodney Seaborn Memorial Award for Lifetime Achievement).

== Recognition and honours ==
- 1997: Officer of the Order of the British Empire
- 1998: Officer of the Order of Australia
- 2001: Appointed director and life governor of NIDA
- 2007: Lifetime Achievement Award, Sydney Theatre Awards

== Personal life ==
Seaborn never married, although he said he had been close a few times. He belonged to several clubs, including Australasian Pioneers and the Royal Sydney Golf Club, because, he said, "I like membership, I like being with people. I've always enjoyed that part of life."

== Death and legacy ==
Seaborn died on 17 May 2008. His funeral was held at All Saints Anglican Church in Woollahra on 26 May 2008. Justice Lloyd Waddy, who had been a founder member of SBW, along with Hon. Tony Larkins, wrote a long eulogy, relating that the press had described Rodney as a "white knight" of the theatre.

The Rodney Seaborn Award continues his philanthropic legacy.

The Rodney Seaborn Library at NIDA bears his name.

== Selected works ==
- Wilson, G. C. (George Charles); Diehm, A. P. (Andrew Peter); Seaborn, R. F. (Rodney F.) (1978), Alcohol in Australia : problems and programmes, McGraw-Hill, ISBN 978-0-07-093463-4
