= Michele Lu Lanzone =

Michele Lu Lanzone is a dramatic monologue by Dario Fo.

== Synopsis ==
The mother of the Sicilian trade unionist Michele Lu Lanzone tells the story of her son's life. He was killed by the Mafia after he discovered a spring in an area which was ridden by drought and where the local people had no choice but to work in the mines. The mother remembers the events from the confines of a mental institution. This piece was performed by Franca Rame as part of the two-act play The Worker Knows 300 Words, The Boss Knows 1,000 - That's Why He's the Boss (L'operaio conosce 300 parole, il padrone 1,000 - per questo lui è il padrone).

== Translations ==
- Fo, Dario. Michele Lu Lanzone. Trans. Ed Emery.
