= Johan Padan and the Discovery of the Americas =

- Written by: Dario Fo
- Original language: Italian

Johan Padan and the Discovery of the Americas is a one-man play by Dario Fo, recipient of the 1997 Nobel Prize in Literature. It is narrated by Johan Padan, a fugitive from the Spanish Inquisition who accompanies Christopher Columbus on his fourth voyage to the New World.

Fo's response to the 1992 quincentennial celebrations of the first voyage of Christopher Columbus to the Americas, the title character is a Venetian fugitive who escapes from the Spanish Inquisition by joining the explorer and coloniser's fourth voyage. Forced to tend the animals on board, a storm casts him adrift in the ocean on the back of a pig until he reaches the coast and is rescued by the indigenous peoples of the Americas. A video recording of Fo's performance exists.

== Cast ==
- Fiorello: Johan Padan (young voice)
- Dario Fo: Johan Padan (old voice)
- Katie McGovern: Autè (voice)

== Plot summary ==
=== Prologue ===
Fo tells the story of being invited to Seville in 1991 to discuss his earlier play, Isabella, Three Tall Ships, and a Con Man, recounting the hostile reception it received in Rome in 1963, and how under the regime of Francisco Franco a Spanish theatre troupe was arrested for attempting to stage that play. Sensing that his Seville audience was hostile as well, Fo improvised a story that would eventually serve as the basis of Johan Padan and the Discovery of the Americas.

=== Part one ===
Johan Padan flees Venice after his lover is arrested by the Inquisition and accused of witchcraft. After several episodes in which he witnesses violent antisemitism in the form of auto da fe and financial fraud committed against Jews who flee such violence, Johan is conscripted as part of Christopher Columbus's crew, where tends the livestock in the ship's hold.

Upon arriving in the Americas, Johan is entranced by the natives and subsequently horrified by the violence committed against them by his fellow Europeans. When the ship he is on is wrecked, he and his fellow animal keepers, survive by floating ashore on the backs of pigs and after many misunderstandings, joins a Caribbean tribe, using his skills of basic surgery, fireworks, and horse training to become the holy man of the tribe.

=== Part two ===
Johan leads the tribe on a journey around the Americas, having comical encounters with other Native American cultures. He teaches his tribe how to tame and ride horses. Finally, in Florida when they come upon a Spanish colony, Johan realizes that the only way to protect his tribe from being enslaved is to convert them to Christianity. He teaches them heretical versions of stories from the Bible and Gospels. When that fails, he uses sabotage, and his expertise with fireworks to drive the Spaniards away.

== Composition ==
Fo researched the journals of a number of European explorers of the fifteenth and sixteenth centuries and wrote the play in a dialect that drew upon the Lombardian, Venetian, Catalanian, Castilian, Provençal, Portuguese and Arabic. His wife, the actor Franca Rame, translated it into modern Italian. Fo also composed a book of illustrations that he uses to prompt himself when he performs the play on stage.

== Performance ==
When performed by Dario Fo, the play is often improvised, using a book of illustrations as a prompt. He uses mime and grammelot and onomatopoeia to represent the action. It is considered to belong to the genre of Teatro di narrazione, which is generally said to have begun with Fo's own Mistero Buffo.

American actor Thomas Derrah is also noted for performing an English language version, translated by Ron Jenkins.

== Historical Antecedents ==
The character of Johan Padan is inspired by both the commedia dell'arte characters of Zanni and Harlequin (characters whom Fo frequently draws upon) and by such historical figures as Cabeza de Vaca, Hans Staten, Gonzalo Guerrico and Michele da Cuneo, early European sailors and explorers of the Americas who came to sympathize with the native peoples and often aided them in resisting Europeans.

== Translations ==
- Johan Padan and the Discovery of America. Trans. Ed Emery.

== Film adaptation ==
In 2002, the play was adapted into an animation film directed by Giulio Cingoli, Venetian Rascal Goes to America (Italian: Johan Padan e la descoverta de le Americhe). Rosario Fiorello and the same Fo did the voice work for the title character.
