= The Birth of the Jongleur =

The Birth of the Jongleur (Italian: La nascita del giullare) is a dramatic monologue by Dario Fo.

== Plot ==
A peasant narrates how he had found and created a fine piece of land, and all was well. But then the Lord of the Manor came to take his land from him. He raped the peasant's wife. The peasant was about to hang himself, when Christ and the disciples appear at his door asking for something to eat. The peasant offers them food. In return Christ gives him the power of speaking out against the rich and powerful.

== Translations ==
- Fo, Dario. The Birth of the Jongleur. Trans. Ed Emery.
