= Archangels Don't Play Pinball =

1959 play written by Dario Fo

- Original language: Italian
- Written by: Dario Fo

Archangels Don't Play Pinball (Italian title: Gli arcangeli non giocano al flipper) is a 1959 two-act play by Dario Fo. The play uses the metaphor of a pinball machine—a new innovation in Italy at the time and one which Fo and his wife Franca Rame were fond of— to convey mechanisation and conspicuous consumption.

== Plot summary ==
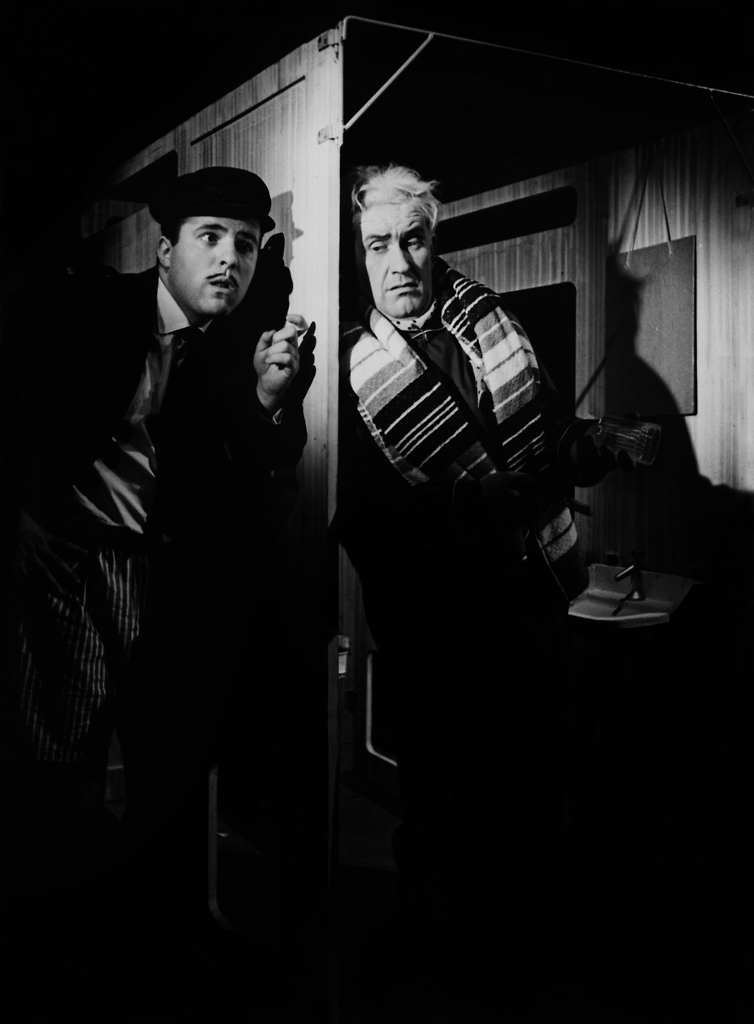
The play by the Ljubljana Drama Theatre in 1963

A group of young Milanese men play a prank on one of their group - "Lofty". They arrange for a fake marriage to take place between Lofty and a prostitute who pretends to be a beautiful Albanian princess. Lofty has a problem - he needs to get identity papers from the Ministry. The only way he can do this is to become a dog. He is taken into a local kennel, where he is eventually bought by a circus owner. After various further adventures, Lofty eventually awakes, only to find that it has all been a dream with the lovely lady there with him. Archangels don't play pinball with people's lives.

== Song ==
The play is also noted for its use of song. One example is "Stringimi forte i polsi" (Hold my wrists tightly together) which the protagonist Il Lungo (Stretch) sings to an "Albanian" prostitute whose wrists he is bound to. It would later be the theme tune to the TV programme Canzonissima which the playwright, Dario Fo, makes a controversial appearance on.

== Translations ==
- Fo, Dario. Archangels Don't Play Pinball, trans. Ed Emery. London: Methuen Books, 1987.
