= The Butterfly Mouse =

The Butterfly Mouse (La parpaja topola) is a dramatic monologue by Dario Fo.

== Synopsis ==
A simple young goatherd was scared of women. In his valley lived a priest who was having a relationship with a young girl. The girl's mother came to see the priest and told him to desist - so the priest plotted to get the goatherd married to the girl, so that he might continue having his illicit relationship. However the goatherd and the girl find love.

== Translations ==
- The Butterfly Mouse. Trans. Ed Emery.
