= Lo svitato =

- Directed by: Carlo Lizzani
- Starring: Dario Fo
- Cinematography: Armando Nannuzzi
- Music by: Roberto Nicolosi
- Release date: 1956
- Running time: 84 minutes
- Country: Italy
- Language: Italian

Lo svitato is a 1956 Italian comedy film directed by Carlo Lizzani.

== Plot ==
Achille is a naive station deliveryman struggling to make a living. He falls in love with a beautiful young woman and, after a series of slapstick attempts, manages to win her over. Meanwhile, a publisher offers him a job as a journalist, giving him the opportunity to investigate the mysterious disappearance of several purebred dogs. However, the offer is a scam intended to allow the publisher to profit from the resulting article and gossip while also stealing Achille's girlfriend from him.

== Cast ==
- Dario Fo as Achille
- Franca Rame as Diana
- Giorgia Moll as Elena
- Leo Pisani as Gigi
- Alberto Bonucci as Traffic policeman
- Franco Parenti as 'Via Emilia Monster'
- Umberto D'Orsi as Journalist
- Carlo Bagno
- Giustino Durano
- Jacopo Fo
