= Elizabeth: Almost by Chance a Woman =

- Written by: Dario Fo
- Original language: Italian

Elizabeth: Almost by Chance a Woman (Italian title: Quasi per caso una donna: Elisabetta) is a play by Dario Fo written in 1984. Franca Rame plays Elizabeth I of England, while Fo plays her transvestite cosmetic adviser.

== Plot summary ==
The play takes place in the boudoir of Elizabeth I of England. In the midst of political upheaval aging Elizabeth is eagerly awaiting the arrival of her lover, the Earl of Essex, who is involved in an attempted coup d'etat against the queen. In order to prepare for this tryst, she has summoned her beautician, Dame Grosslady, who speaks primarily in grammelot.

== Features ==
It is not unusual for Fo to violate nineteenth century theatre conventions of the fourth wall in his work. Elizabeth: Almost by Chance a Woman does this to a greater degree than most of his work.

In the original production, Dame Grosslady was played by Fo and Elizabeth was played by his wife Franca Rame. This fact was often alluded to in improvisations. At one point Fo drops any pretence at playing a role, and addresses the audience as a playwright who is married to the lead actress. These improvisations made their way into the published script.

The first American production opened with an open letter to then U.S. President, Ronald Reagan, in which Fo addressed Reagan as a fellow actor, ironically thanking him for the free publicity afforded to Fo due to the earlier refusal by the State Department to grant him a visa. This letter also notes that any semblance between Elizabeth and Reagan, in terms of personal vanity, covert operations (one scheme enacted by Elizabeth's spies has a remarkable similarity to the Iran-Contra Affair) is purely coincidental. This letter appears in the English language version translated by Ron Jenkins.

Elizabeth speculates over the course of the play, that William Shakespeare's characters Hamlet, Cleopatra and Richard II are satirical portrayals of herself. Fo, both in his role of Dame Grosslady and in his open letter to President Reagan, denies Elizabeth's speculation that Shakespeare would have ever written political satire.
