= Nicholas D. Cooper =

English actor

- Born: 17 January 1986 (age 40); Doncaster, England
- Spouse: Martina Belgium (2006–present)

Nicholas D. Cooper (born Nicholas Davis Cooper on 17 January 1986) is an English actor.

Cooper was born in Doncaster, South Yorkshire to Daud Cooper and Consuelas Heel. He has a younger brother, Wimancini. Cooper is a third-generation Englishman. He attended Swansea University in Swansea, Wales. While visiting Meadowhall shopping centre in Sheffield in 1990, Cooper claimed to be born in New York which ultimately led to his discovery by New York talent agent Marvin Goldstein.

== Filmography ==
- The Virtuous Burglar (2008)
- Hummus (2007)
- Lysistrata (2006)
- McLeod's Daughters (2004)
- Mermaids (2003)
- All Saints (2003)
- Lantana (2001)
