= The First Miracle of the Infant Jesus =

The First Miracle of the Infant Jesus is a monologue by Dario Fo, recipient of the 1997 Nobel Prize in Literature.

It was originally published in Italian language as Il primo miracolo di Gesù Bambino in 1977, together with "The Tale of a Tiger" [Storia della tigre], "Dedalo e Icaro" [Daedalus and Icarus] and "Il sacrificio di Isacco" [Isaac's Sacrifice] in the collection Storia della tigre e altre storie [The tale of a Tiger and other Stories].

The pre-Christmas 1987 performance of The First Miracle of the Infant Jesus on Italian television's variety-lottery show Fantastico led to further accusations of blasphemy from the Vatican; Fo portrayed the title character deploying bolts of lightning to save other children from a bully.

The story of the Baby Jesus is told from an unusual point of view. The young child finds that he has the power to do miracles. When the other children refuse to play with him, he takes clay, breathes on it, and turns it into birds that fly. He is also tempted to turn bullies into pillars of stone.

== Translations ==
- Fo, Dario. The First Miracle of the Infant Jesus. trans. Ed Emery, London: Oberon Books, 1990.
