= Mamma Togni =

Play written by Dario Fo and Franca Rame

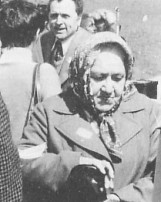
- Giuseppina Modena (Mamma Togni)
- Written by: Dario Fo, Franca Rame
- Characters: Mamma Togni
- Original language: Italian

Mamma Togni is a dramatic monologue by Dario Fo and Franca Rame, set in Italy after the Second World War. It was performed in 1973.

The monologue is a tribute to Giuseppina Modena (known as Mamma Togni), partisan gold medalist of the Italian Resistance, who during the Second World War lost her husband and 22-year-old son Lorenzo "Enzo" Togni, to whom a Garibaldi partisan brigade was named. On April 9, 1972, during the campaign for the 1972 Italian general election, the woman interrupted a meeting of the deputy Franco Servello, hitting him with a walking stick: for this reason the woman was arrested along with eight other people (including Rinaldo Nalli and Luigi Pastorelli, respectively municipal councillors of the Socialist party and Communist party) and tried, but eventually she was acquitted in 1976.

It was performed for the first time during the Liberation Day in the square in Pavia on 25 April 1972, played by Franca Rame, and then published by Einaudi in Guerra di popolo in Cile (1973). The monologue was performed by Franca Rame also on 31 December 1975 in Piazza del Duomo, Milan.

== Plot summary ==
Mamma Togni is a seventy-year-old former legendary partisan nurse from the Apennines hills of the Oltrepò Pavese. One day some boys called her into the street that Senator Franco Servello was holding a political rally in the square of Montù Beccaria (province of Pavia, Lombardy), where during the Second World War the fascists had killed 14 partisans in front of their mothers eyes.

Mamma Togni rushed in front of the stage of the rally, unleashing her stick and hits the microphone and then the knee of the politician and offending him as fascist.

The captain of the Carabinieri tries to stop Mamma Togni's trouble, who reiterates that she cannot tolerate the presence of a fascist in that place, since the fascists have killed her son. Eleven guys who followed the scene from the arcades of the square approach, but are loaded and beaten in blood by Carabinieri for no reason and finally arrested and loaded on a truck to police station.

Mamma Togni, together with a communist councillor, runs to the police station to talk to the Questore and tell how the whole thing happened, but the marshal stops them and at a certain point he falls pretending to have been hit by someone. Fifty Carabinieri arrive and begin to truncheon the councillor and Mamma Togni, who are arrested and tried immediately, while dozens of citizens of the village arrive outside the police station to ask for the release of Mamma Togni.

The trial takes place in a farcical manner, with the judge trying in every way to avoid the conviction for Mamma Togni, who instead proudly claims to have deliberately gone to the main square to throw a beating at Senator Servello screaming "fascists killers". The judge, however, does not feel up to continuing the process and makes everyone free: it is a great joy, similar to the Liberation Day.

Mamma Togni remembers the war, when she saved 32 wounded guys from the great raking of the winter of 1944–1945, placing them in a farmhouse and feeding them every day, with the good ones (receiving the help of farmers and mountain dwellers) or with the bad ones (robbing the wealthy with her pistol P38). One day a partisan told her that his son Enzo Togni had been killed on 18 September 1944 in Varzi by the "black robbers". Addressing her boys, the nurse tells them that, having no one left, from now on she would become the mother of all: Mamma Togni.

The monologue ends with Mamma Togni who, answering to those who tell her not to get in the way anymore, because she is too old and had already done her duty, says that as long as there will be fascist killers around, we must go to the streets to tell the young people what happened during the war. While only those who give up fighting are old, remaining warm at home with a cap lent by the old and dead Christian Democrats as Amintore Fanfani and Giulio Andreotti.
