= An Arab Woman Speaks =

1972 monologue

An Arab Woman Speaks is a dramatic monologue from Fedayn (1972) by Dario Fo and Franca Rame.

In 1972 Franca Rame went to Lebanon to discuss with Palestinians in the camps. When she returned to Milan she received a tape from an Arab woman, telling the story of her life. She married for love. But her husband beat her, so she left him, ran away and joined the Palestinian guerrilla movement. She describes how she was involved in the assassination of a high-ranking police officer.

== Translations ==
An English translation has been made by Ed Emery.
