= Isabella, Three Sailing Ships and a Con Man =

- Written by: Dario Fo
- Original language: Italian

Premiere
- Date premiered: 1963

Isabella, Three Sailing Ships and a Con Man (Italian title: Isabella, tre caravelle e un cacciaballe) is a 1963 two-act play by Italian playwright Dario Fo. The play was controversial at its time for its political content, which caused massive outrage amongst far-right supporters in Italy; Fo received threatening letters, was assaulted in Rome by fascist groups, while another performance was disrupted by a bomb scare. He recounted this event in the prologue of Johan Padan and the Discovery of the Americas.

== Plot summary ==
The play is considered "an attempt to demystify and debunk the traditional history-book image" of Christopher Columbus. Fo said: "I wanted to attack those Italian intellectuals who, with the centre-left and the Socialist Party in the government, had discovered power and its advantages and leapt on it like rats on a piece of cheese. I wanted to dismantle a character who had been embalmed as a hero in school history books, whereas he is in fact an intellectual who tries to keep afloat within the mechanisms of power, play games with the King and be cunning with power figures, only to end up reduced to a wretch."

Isabella... is a play-within-a-play wherein an actor condemned to death (for performing the works of a banned author) is granted a last wish to perform one last play. He performs a history of Christopher Columbus, of which Roberto Rebora, writing in Sipario in 1963, says:

The play about Columbus presents the Genovese hero as an obsessive, wily individual, pitting his wits against Isabella, Filippo, Giovanna the madwoman, the (Spanish) court, sailing ships, enemies, a trial, and eventual obscurity, a consequence of the fact that cunning and unscrupulousness (even to honourable ends) is not enough if the powers that be are not on your side.'

== Production history ==
The play was first produced at the Teatro Odeon in Milan on 6 September 1963, in a production directed by Fo himself. It was later broadcast on RAI 2 in May 1977, and revived at the Centro Dramatico Nacional in Valencia, Spain in 1992 (again directed by Fo).

== Translations ==
- Fo, Dario. "Isabell, Tre Caravelle e un Cacciaballe". www.geocities.ws. translated by Ed Emery.
