= Trumpets and Raspberries =

Play written by Dario Fo

- Original language: Italian
- Written by: Dario Fo

Trumpets and Raspberries (Italian title: Clacson, trombette e pernacchi) is a satirical play by Dario Fo, first performed in 1981.

== Plot summary ==
The fictional plot revolves around a real political figure, Gianni Agnelli, head of the Fiat corporation from 1966 to 2003. When Agnelli is disfigured in a failed kidnap attempt, he is rescued by Antonio, one of his Fiat employees. Antonio flees the scene when people start shooting at him, leaving his jacket on Agnelli's body. Agnelli is taken to hospital in Antonio's jacket, where he mistakenly has his face reconstructed in Antonio's likeness. Farcical confusion ensues.

== List of characters ==
- Antonio Berardi / Gianni Agnelli (normally played by the same person)
- Rosa Berardi
- Lucia
- Police Inspector
- Magistrate
- Doctor
- Secret Agent Leader Fellini
- Policeman
- Man with Fridge
- Secret Agents / Orderlies
- Statue

== Translations ==
- Fo, Dario. Trumpets and Raspberries, trans. Ed Emery.
- Fo, Dario. About Face. trans. Ron Jenkins, New York: Samuel French.

A performance of the Kurdish language adaption of the play was banned by representatives of the Turkish Government because the content of the play was deemed to support the Kurdistan Workers' Party (PKK).
