= The Devil with Boobs =

Two-act play by Dario Fo

- Original language: Italian
- Written by: Dario Fo

The Devil with Boobs (Italian title: Il diavolo con le zinne) is a two-act play by Dario Fo, recipient of the 1997 Nobel Prize in Literature.

First produced at Messina's Teatro Vittorio Emmanuele on 7 August 1997 (directed by Dario Fo), an English production occurred at the National Theatre Youth project in Summer 1999.

Described by Fo as "a Machiavellian comedy, a gigantic late sixteenth-century intrigue, with judges and devils, housekeepers possessed by devils, hermits, gendarmes, torturers and even a monkey", it featured an homage to his long-time collaborator Fiorenzo Carpi who had died earlier that year (1997).

== Plot summary ==
As described by Cappa and Nepoli, 'Alfonso Ferdinando de Tristano, an incorruptible, progressive magistrate (who disapproves of torture as an instrument of persuasion) investigates an arson in the cathedral. Unhappy about being subjected to his investigation, the prominent citizens of the town launch a campaign to discredit him, employing a couple of devils. One of them is instructed to enter the magistrate's body "through the most suitable orifice, the anus," transforming him into a rogue, a debauchee, a hypocrite and a black marketeer. Due to a misunderstanding, the devil Barlocca enters the body of Pizzocca Gannàssa, Alfonso's elderly and ungainly housekeeper, who is transformed into a delectable, busty lady (the 'boobs' of the title). Led astray by this beauty, the magistrate is dragged into court, but the she-devil allows him to be acquitted. Nonetheless, he is condemned to become a galley slave in a subsequent trial.'

== Translations ==
- Fo, Dario. The Devil in Drag. Trans. Ed Emery, in New Connections 99, London: Faber and Faber, 1999.
