= Stephen Stenning =

Stephen Mark Bailey OBE, known professionally as Stephen Stenning, joined the British Council in 2011 as Director Arts Middle East North Africa. He is currently British Council's Director Culture and Development in which role he set up and oversees the UK Cultural Protection Fund. Prior to joining the British Council he was Director of Edinburgh Mela and on the Board of Festival's Edinburgh. He used to be Senior Producer at UZ Ltd. delivering festivals such as Big in Falkirk (Scotland's National Street Arts Festival), "The Merchant City Festival" and working directly with artists and companies. Stenning was Chief Executive of Aberdeen International Youth Festival from 2003 to 2007.

He used to be Associate Director (Community) of Dundee Rep Theatre. He produced HOME Aberdeen for the National Theatre of Scotland in 2006 directed by Alison Peebles with a cast including Michael Marra.

Stenning was an actor and he has worked internationally including in Bulgaria, Romania and the United States.

He is a Specialist Advisor to the Scottish Arts Council/Creative Scotland, A Board Member of The Independent Street Arts Network, of Festival's Edinburgh, UZ Arts and Articulation.

Stenning was appointed Officer of the Order of the British Empire (OBE) in the 2023 Birthday Honours for services to UK cultural relations.

== Works ==
- Adaptation of Dario Fo's 'Il ratto della Francesca, which was first published by Oberon Books in 1994 as Abducting Diana and then re-printed in 1997 when Dario Fo won the Nobel Prize for Literature.
- Other full-length adaptations include "Widow's Union" an English-language version of Ginette Beauvais Garcin's 'Le Clan des Veuves'.
- Full-length commissions include "Sweet Sister" for Bill Kenwright Limited.
- 'Arts Knowledge Bank' contributor and contributor to research on Arts Management in European Journal of Cultural Management.
