= One was Nude and One wore Tails =

One Was Nude and One Wore Tails is a one-act farce by Dario Fo, in which a man escaping from the scene of a love affair is forced to find a place to hide. The only available place is a dustbin on wheels, operated by a road sweeper. The two men engage in philosophical discussions while they work out how to find some clothes for the miscreant.
