= The Tumult of Bologna =

Historical fiction monologue by Dario Fo

The Tumult of Bologna (Italian: Il tumulto di Bologna) is a historical fiction monologue by Italian writer Dario Fo.

== Synopsis ==
As summarised by Joel Schechter, the story covers the revolt of a large band of Bolognese citizens in 1324. After suffering huge losses in a series of religious wars, angry Bolognese citizens rebel against legates of the Pope and their Provençal guards. The papal delegation is besieged by a people's army that, in lack of other weapons, uses its own excrement. The siege lasts for eleven days, "during which excrement was constantly thrown over the fortress walls". Eventually the Provençal troupes and legates leave the area "under a shower of human ordure."

== Translations ==
- Fo, Dario. The Tumult of Bologna. Trans. Ed Emery.
