= The Open Couple =

- Original language: Italian
- Written by: Franca Rame; Dario Fo
- Genre: Comedy (drama)

The Open Couple (Italian title: Coppia aperta, quasi spalancata) is a play by Dario Fo. As with some of Fo's other plays, it is a romantic play which was written by his wife Franca Rame in 1983.

The Italian censors restricted it to audiences over the age of 18 when Rame included as a prologue her monologue The Rape (inspired by her own rape).

== Plot summary ==
In this farce about sexual politics in marriage, a man persuades his suicidal wife that an open marriage is politically correct and embarks on dalliances with younger women, to her dismay and fury. After deciding to be on her own, the tables are turned when she confesses to a new man, Nobel Prize nominated professor and inspired singer-songwriter; it is the husband who becomes suicidal.

== Cast ==
- Dario Fo (Husband)
- Franca Rame (Wife)
