= Rascel-Fifì =

- Directed by: Guido Leoni
- Written by: Dario Fo; Dino Verde; Guido Leoni
- Cinematography: Gianni Di Venanzo
- Music by: Gino Mazzocchi; Renato Rascel
- Release date: 1957
- Country: Italy
- Language: Italian

Rascel-Fifì is a 1957 Italian crime-comedy film directed by Guido Leoni. It is a parody of Jules Dassin's Rififi. The film was a success at the Italian box office.

== Plot ==
Renato and Gideone team up in business and open a nightclub in one of the worst and infamous neighborhoods in New York. Provoking the ire of Gionata a gangster owner of a nightclub right in front of Renato's, the boss will open a series of actions to close the competitors' business, first by sending a dancer, Barbara, who, performing in a risqué show, tries to get the police to intervene, then with the kidnapping of Renatino, son of Renato, to blackmail his father.

Renatino proves to be smarter than he seems, challenges Gionata to the dice and beats him, making him lose all the money and also the club.

Michaela, daughter of the bandit, has in the meantime fallen in love with Renato and helps him find her son, everything will end in a marriage and Gionata will pass, with her accomplices, in Renato's service.

== Cast ==
- Renato Rascel: Renato
- Annie Fratellini: Michaela
- Dario Fo: Pupo aka "The Blonde"
- Franca Rame: Barbara
- Peppino De Martino: Gedeone
- Carlo Hintermann: Tre Dita
- Riccardo Cucciolla: Undici
- Gino Buzzanca: Gionata
- Enzo Garinei: The Prince
- Antonella Steni: TV Presenter
- Zoe Incrocci: Miss Patrick
- Gisella Sofio: Woman at the phone
- Ignazio Leone: Pensylvania Bill
