= The Tale of a Tiger =

- Original language: Italian
- Written by: Dario Fo

The Tale of a Tiger (Italian: La storia della tigre) is a dramatic monologue by Dario Fo. Fo collected material for it during a June 1975 visit to China with his wife Franca Rame and other members of their theatre company, and he toured around Italy with it in 1978.

== Plot summary ==
During Mao's Long March across China, a revolutionary soldier is wounded. His comrades leave him behind. Gangrene sets in, and he believes that he is about to die. He drags himself into a cave and falls into a deep sleep. When he awakens, he is confronted by the sight of a tiger and her cub. What follows is a comic narrative about their domestic life together, as the tiger nurses him back to health.

== Translations ==
- Fo, Dario. The Tale of a Tiger, trans. Ed Emery.
