= The Virtuous Burglar =

Play by Dario Fo

- Original language: Italian
- Written by: Dario Fo

The Virtuous Burglar (Italian title: Non tutti i ladri vengono per nuocere) is a one-act play by Dario Fo.

== Plot summary ==
A Feydeau-style farce in which a burglar who is in the act of burgling the house is interrupted by the arrival of a couple – who are in fact having an affair. The farcical complications that ensue also involve the arrival of the burglar's wife. In the end, as they are all arguing among themselves, yet another burglar arrives to burgle the flat.

The play begins with a burglar breaking into a luxury flat. His wife phones him and he is annoyed. As he hangs up, the owner of the house and a woman turn up. The burglar hides inside a grandfather clock but knocks the pendulum, leading the owner and the woman to think that the clock has struck 1:00am. The owner and the woman are having an affair. The owner complains that his wife is so old fashioned and the woman complains that her husband is easily persuaded.

The burglar's wife phones and the owner answers. The burglar's wife thinks she is talking to her husband and that he is having an affair. The owner explains that he isn't her husband and believes that because the husband was watching them, he is a private detective, hired by his wife to see if he was having an affair. This leads the burglar's wife to think that the owner of the house's wife and her husband are having an affair. The owner tells her to phone the house where he thinks his wife is. The woman believes that the 'detective' has phoned the police already and tells the owner to shoot himself. As he is about to pull the trigger, the clock strikes 12:30. This confuses the owner and the woman as they believe the clock is going backwards. The burglar emerges from the clock, having been hit repeatedly by the pendulum. The owner and the woman think they have found the 'detective' and plan to shoot him.

The burglar convinces them not to, but instead, get him drunk. Suddenly, the burglar steals the gun from the owner and threatens him. He reveals he is a burglar. This interests the woman as she has an obsession with "Celebrated Crimes and Thefts." The burglar proves he is a leading member of a notorious gang.

Suddenly, the owner's wife, Anna, turns up. The owner takes the gun and forces the burglar to pretend to be the woman's husband. Anna comes in and tells them she had a telephone call from a woman (the burglar's wife) who said she was having an affair with her husband. The owner introduces the burglar and his "wife" and Anna invites them to stay the night. The spiteful burglar agrees, much to the disdain of the owner and the woman.

The woman and Anna go to sort out a room. The owner forces the burglar at gunpoint to steal, because the burglar said that they exploited burglars. The burglar's real wife turns up and, after a brief conversation, believes that her husband has two wives. Anna appears and the owner poorly explains why the burglar has two wives. The owner spitefully tells the real wife to come and meet the other "wife".

After they have left, a man, Antonio, appears, asking Anna if she is alone. They are having an affair too. Antonio believes Anna set everything up so that she could cancel their date to have an affair with someone else. At this point, the burglar returns to collect his bag. Antonio thinks the burglar and Anna are having an affair and locks them in. Anna explains but Antonio loses the key. Suddenly, the "wives" and owner return. The burglar helps Antonio hide in the clock. The burglar's real wife wants to leave, but there is no key. The burglar picks the lock. As he does so, the clock strikes 1:00am. Antonio emerges, having also been hit by the pendulum. The woman and Antonio are surprised to see each other as they are married.

The burglar attempts to explain things, but the others shut him up so he doesn't reveal the affairs, saying it's all one big misunderstanding. The burglar and his wife escape. The others try and catch them. As they do, another burglar arrives. The others, thinking the first burglar has returned to collect his loot, grab the second burglar. They tell him it's all one big misunderstanding and say they will explain. As they all ramble on with their lies, the second burglar escapes.

== Translations ==
- Emery, Ed. The Good that a Burglar Can Bring
- Farrell, Joe, The Virtuous Burglar.
