= The Pope and the Witch =

1989 play

- Original language: Italian
- Written by: Dario Fo

The Pope and the Witch (Italian title: Il Papa e la strega) is a satirical play by Dario Fo, first performed in 1989. It depicts the Pope as a paranoid, drug-addled idiot and the Vatican as corrupt.

Fo, an Italian actor-playwright awarded the 1997 Nobel Prize in Literature, is known for aiming his sarcasm and slapstick comedy at authority, and in The Pope and the Witch he takes dead aim at the highest levels of the Roman Catholic Church.

== Plot summary ==
At the outset, the nameless pope, with 100,000 orphans waiting in St. Peter's Square and the world's press assembled for a news conference in the Vatican, is in the throes of paranoia, believing that the appearance of the children is sponsored by manufacturers of condoms in a plot to embarrass the Church.

The witch, in nun's habit, turns up as an aide to the doctor summoned to treat the pope, and before long the Holy Father is seized with a paralytic affliction that, among other names, is known as a crucifixion stroke, leaving him with his arms outstretched.

== 2006 U.S. incident ==
In October 2006, top Catholic leaders in the Midwestern U.S. state of Minnesota took the rare step of collectively calling on University of Minnesota president, Robert Bruininks, to reconsider the university's plan to stage a controversial play which they viewed as anti-Catholic.

Archbishop Harry Flynn of the Archdiocese of St. Paul and Minneapolis, along with bishops from Crookston to Winona, wrote to Bruininks calling the play offensive to the state's 1.6 million Catholics. They urged Bruininks to rethink the staging of the play in March 2007.

== Translations ==
Ed Emery has carried out an authorised English translation.
