= Mistero Buffo =

Play by Dario Fo

Mistero buffo: Giullarata popolare
- Original language: Italian, Grammelot
- Written by: Dario Fo
- Characters: Narrator/Herald/Introducer; Virgin Mary; Mad Woman; Giullare, a jongleur; Peasant; The Fool; Death; Christ
- Setting: The Holy Land, First Century C.E.

Premiere
- Date: October 1, 1969
- Place: Casa del Popolo, Sestri Levante, Italy

Mistero buffo ("Comical Mystery Play") is Dario Fo's solo pièce célèbre, performed across Europe, Canada and Latin America from 1969 to 1999. It is recognised as one of the most controversial and popular spectacles in postwar European theatre and its broadcast in Italy prompted the Vatican to denounce it as "the most blasphemous show in the history of television".

Mistero buffo is a series of brief monologues with Biblical themes, drawn from the Biblical apocrypha and popular tales of the life of Christ. The performance texts are in a mixture of Italian, dialect and grammelot – a constructed or rather extemporised language that draws on, and mixes up, regional languages.

Fo's work originates in the surviving texts and descriptions of the giullari, itinerant players of medieval times, who would travel to towns and villages, bringing the latest news. The title of the piece is borrowed from Mystery-Bouffe by Vladimir Mayakovsky. An authorised English translation has been carried out by Ed Emery.
