= Can't Pay? Won't Pay! =

1974 play by Dario Fo

- Written by: Dario Fo
- Original language: Italian
- Subject: Consumer backlash against high prices
- Genre: Political satire

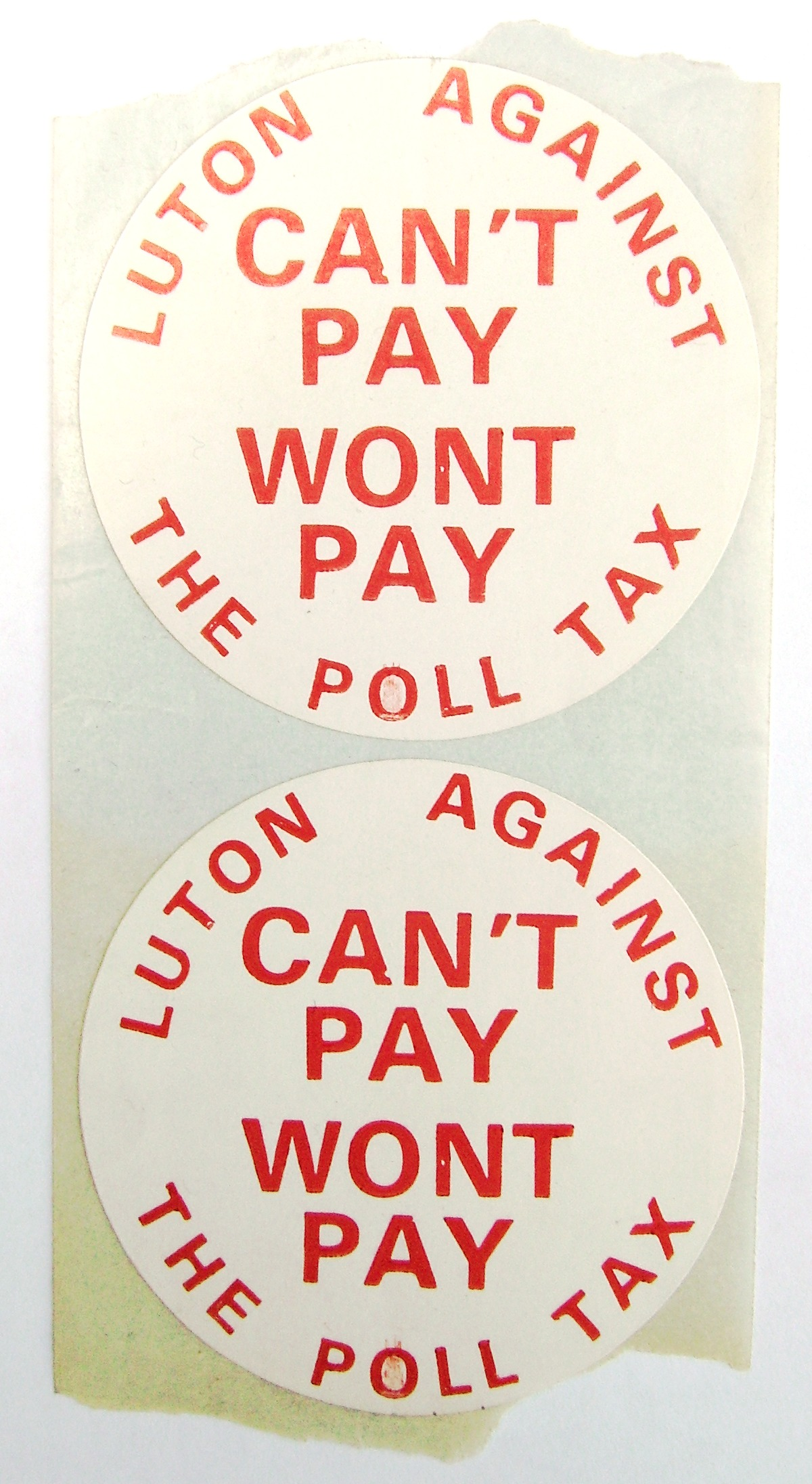
Two stickers, still on their backing sheet, from the group "Luton Against The Poll Tax", using the slogan "Can't pay won't pay", popularised by the Dario Fo play of that name

Can't Pay? Won't Pay! (Italian: Non Si Paga! Non Si Paga!, also translated We Can't Pay? We Won't Pay! and Low Pay? Don't Pay!) is a play originally written in Italian by Dario Fo in 1974. Regarded as Fo's best-known play internationally after Morte accidentale di un anarchico, it had been performed in 35 countries by 1990. Considered a Marxist political farce, it is a comedy about consumer backlash against high prices.

It was the first show performed in the Palazzina Liberty on 3 October 1974. A North American English-language adaptation by R. G. Davis was published in 1984. The American premiere was performed by the San Francisco Mime Troupe.

The title of the original English translation in 1975 by Lino Pertile, Can't Pay? Won't Pay!, has passed into the English language.

== Social significance ==
The play is written to criticize merchants and landlords responsible for raising the prices of necessary goods and rent, and the bosses who cut jobs, salaries, and benefits. However, the "real political target of the play was the moderatism of the [Italian Communist Party] as represented by Antonia's husband, Giovanni." At the time the play was written, its leader Enrico Berlinguer had launched a program of "historical compromise". This meant that members were to follow a "policy of sacrifices" for the "national interest", reluctantly acceding to lower working-class living standards. In Berlinguer's words: "A more austere society can be, and must be, a more equal, better ordered and more just society, which is really more democratic and free, and definitely more human." Rank-and-file Italian communists were critical of this policy, which gave no hope for their living standards to improve. Fo was urging party members to reject the policies of their party leadership.

The original Italian, unlike the English version, makes direct criticisms of the Italian Communist Party (PCI). For example, not included in the English version is when Antonia tells Giovanni:

I'm fed up with your hot air... your speeches about responsibility about sacrifice...about the dignity of tightening your belt, about your pride about being working class! And who are these workers? Who is this working class? It's us, didn't you know?... But you can't see a thing because your eyes are tied up like you were playing blind man's buff...and you sit around like god knows what mouthing off your slogans"

Additionally, as the play goes on, Giovanni's character grows more critical of the "policy of sacrifice" and the powerlessness he feels from them:

You can't just say to the bosses... "Excuse me, could you just move over there; we need a bit of breathing space. Please be a little kinder, a bit more understanding...let's come to an agreement." Oh no, the only way to get that mob thinking straight is to stuff them down the bog and pull the chain! Then things would be great. Maybe there would be a few less illuminated window displays, less motorways...we've always been rushing around to keep them going...now we'll keep ourselves going...we'll build our own houses...make a new life for ourselves!

== Criticisms ==
Some Leftist Italians criticized the play because they found it to be too similar to Fo's older plays. Fo responded that he had never abandoned farce.

Two weeks after the play's first performance, women in Milan began taking control of the cash registers and paying the prices for items before the sudden raise in costs; right-wing newspapers considered Fo and Can't Pay? Won't Pay! to have inspired the incidents. Fo responded to these allegations, commenting:

It emerged during cross-examination that the prices fixed by the supermarkets were out-and-out robbery. In the end all the women who had been charged were freed because "there was no case to answer". To put it simply, the court decided that those shoppers had paid the correct value of the goods. Consequently, you can deduce that the owners had arbitrarily increased the process, doubling them. The bosses were the real thieves.

Rumors circled that Fo would be arrested for the actions of the Red Brigades, though he never was. Fo reflected on this and the reasons for the rumor: "Perhaps, they don't want to just frighten us. Maybe they're trying to discredit The Commune as well which, with its thousands of members, is becoming an increasingly awkward phenomenon."
