= Dario Fo =

Italian playwright, actor, singer-songwriter, director, and politician

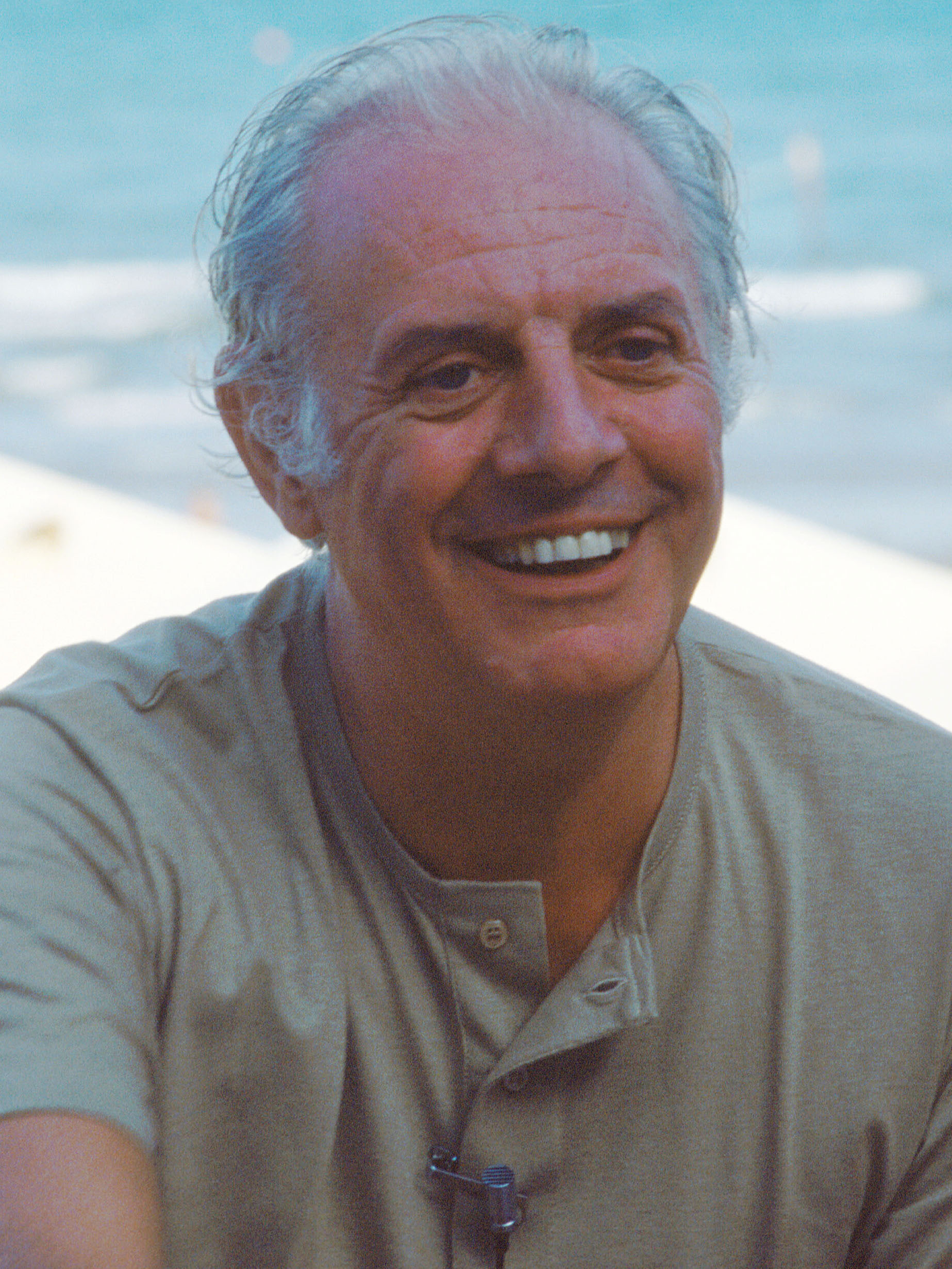
- Fo in 1985
- Born: Dario Luigi Angelo Fo; 24 March 1926; Sangiano, Kingdom of Italy
- Died: 13 October 2016 (aged 90); Milan, Italy
- Occupations: Playwright; actor; director; composer
- Spouse: Franca Rame (m. 1954; died 2013)
- Children: Jacopo Fo
- Website: www.dariofo.it

- Writing career
- Period: Post-war era
- Genre: Drama
- Subjects: Abortion; assassinations; conspicuous consumption; corruption; drug addiction; European history; mechanisation; organised crime; power; racism; Roman Catholic theology; sexism; war
- Notable works: The Virtuous Burglar; Archangels Don't Play Pinball; Mistero Buffo; Accidental Death of an Anarchist; Can't Pay? Won't Pay!; Trumpets and Raspberries; Elizabeth: Almost by Chance a Woman; The Pope and the Witch
- Notable awards: Nobel Prize in Literature; 1997

Dario Luigi Angelo Fo (Italian: [ˈdaːrjo ˈfɔ]; 24 March 1926 – 13 October 2016) was an Italian playwright, actor, theatre director, stage designer, songwriter, political campaigner for the Italian left wing and the recipient of the 1997 Nobel Prize in Literature. In his time he was "arguably the most widely performed contemporary playwright in world theatre". Much of his dramatic work depends on improvisation and comprises the recovery of "illegitimate" forms of theatre, such as those performed by giullari (medieval strolling players) and, more famously, the ancient Italian style of commedia dell'arte.

His plays have been translated into 30 languages and performed across the world, including in Argentina, Bulgaria, Canada, Chile, India, Iran, the Netherlands, Poland, Romania, South Africa, South Korea, Spain, Sri Lanka, Sweden, the United Kingdom, the United States, and Yugoslavia. His work of the 1960s, 1970s and 1980s is peppered with criticisms of assassinations, corruption, organised crime, racism, Roman Catholic theology, and war. Throughout the 1990s and 2000s, he took to lampooning Forza Italia and its leader Silvio Berlusconi, while his targets of the 2010s included the banks amid the European sovereign-debt crisis. Also in the 2010s, he became the main ideologue of the Five Star Movement, the anti-establishment party led by Beppe Grillo, often referred to by its members as "the Master".

Fo's solo pièce célèbre, titled Mistero Buffo and performed across Europe, Asia, Canada and Latin America over a 30-year period, is recognised as one of the most controversial and popular spectacles in postwar European theatre and has been denounced by Cardinal Ugo Poletti, Cardinal Vicar for the Diocese of Rome, as "the most blasphemous show in the history of television". The title of the original English translation of Non Si Paga! Non Si Paga! (Can't Pay? Won't Pay!) has passed into the English language, and the play is described as capturing "something universal in actions and reactions of the working class".

His receipt of the 1997 Nobel Prize in Literature marked the "international acknowledgment of Fo as a major figure in twentieth-century world theatre". The Swedish Academy praised Fo as a writer "who emulates the jesters of the Middle Ages in scourging authority and upholding the dignity of the downtrodden". He owned and operated a theatre company. Fo was an atheist.

== Early life and education ==
An eldest child, Fo was born at Sangiano, in Lombardy's Province of Varese, near the eastern shore of Lake Maggiore. His younger brother Fulvio would become a theatre administrator, their younger sister Bianca Fo Garambois, a writer. Their mother, Pina Rota Fo, from a peasant background, wrote a book of reminiscences of the area between the wars, Il paese delle rane (Land of Frogs, 1978). Their father, Felice, was a station master for the Italian state railway, and the family frequently moved along the Swiss border when Felice was transferred to new postings. Felice, a socialist, was also an actor, appearing for an amateur theatre company in works by Ibsen among others. Fo learned storytelling from his maternal grandfather and Lombard fishers and glassblowers. Among the places in which Fo lived during his early years was Porto Valtravaglia, a glassblowing colony in which, it has been claimed, resided the highest percentage of insane people in Italy.

In 1942, Fo moved to Milan to study at the Academy Brera Academy. However, the Second World War intervened. At age 16, Fo was part of the last generation of soldiers drafted by the fascist army of Mussolini's Repubblica Sociale Italiana. Years later, when questioned about his affiliation, Fo explained that he initially opted to adopt a low profile because his family was active in the anti-fascist Resistance. Fo secretly helped his father to smuggle refugees and Allied soldiers to Switzerland by disguising them as Lombard peasants. His father is also thought to have helped smuggle Jewish scientists to the safety of Switzerland. As the end of the war approached, Fo joined an anti-aircraft division of the navy, anticipating an immediate discharge due to a shortage of munitions. He was mistaken and was instead dispatched to a camp in Monza at which Benito Mussolini himself arrived. Fo soon deserted with the aid of false documents and wandered for a while before joining a parachute squadron. He then deserted this as well, prompting a further unsuccessful search for the Resistance movement during which he slept rough in the countryside.

His statements were widely denied by the testimonies of both partisans and his fascist comrades according to whom Fo participated, with the task of carrying bombs, in the roundup of Val Cannobina for the reconquest of Ossola, as well as by a sentence of the court of Varese on 15 February 1979.

After the war Fo returned to the Brera Academy, also taking up architectural studies at the Politecnico di Milano. He started a thesis on Roman architecture, but becoming disillusioned by the cheap impersonal work expected of architects after the war, he left his studies before his final examinations. He had a nervous breakdown; a doctor told him to spend time doing that which brought him joy. He began to paint and became involved in the piccoli teatri (small theatres) movement, in which he began to present improvised monologues.

He considered his artistic influences to include Beolco, Brecht, Chekhov, De Filippo, Gramsci, Mayakovsky, Molière, Shaw and Strehler.

== Career ==
=== 1950s ===
In 1950, Fo asked to work with Franco Parenti on a variety show performed by radio actors, beginning a collaboration that would last until 1954. Fo delighted audiences with stories of his upbringing, which Parenti was very impressed by, describing them as "absolutely original, with an extraordinary humour, wit and personification. When the show was over we'd go for walks round the lake and he'd tell me more stories. In this way we originated a project in which we would work together on a new type of revue, one which didn't copy reality, but which involved people and took a stand."

In late 1951, after Fo had gained experience with Parenti, Italian national radio station RAI invited Fo to perform a solo Saturday evening comedy series Poer nano (Poor thing), airing after Parenti's Anacleto the Gas Man. Fo created 18 adult fairy tale monologues adapted from biblical and historical tales. The series also featured Shakespearean tales with various twists, such as a version of Hamlet in which the titular character kills his father to continue an affair with his mother; Ophelia is portrayed as Hamlet's uncle's trans mistress, while Horatio plays the ghost of Hamlet's father dressed up as a sheet and only appears when Hamlet is drunk. The series also featured an albino Othello and a sadistic Juliet who keeps Romeo in her garden with savage dogs. Scandalised authorities cancelled the show. Nevertheless, Fo performed it on stage at the Teatro Odeon in Milan in 1952, which allowed him to develop the gesture and action not required for radio. Also in 1952, Fo performed Cocoricò with Giustino Durano, which featured a 20-minute sketch focusing on the plight of black people in the United States.

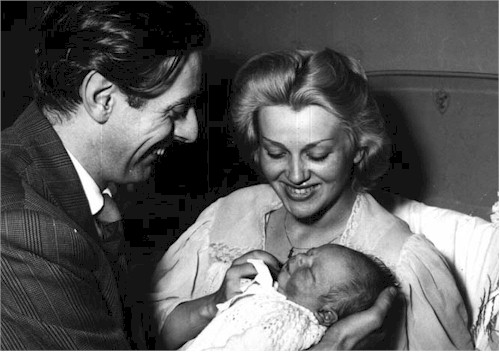
Dario Fo and Franca Rame with their newborn son Jacopo

In 1953, Fo—in collaboration with Parenti and Durano in their own revue company which they called I Dritti (The Stand-ups)—co-wrote, co-directed and designed the sets and costumes for a revue called Il dito nell'occhio (A finger in the eye). In these early years, Fo has been influenced by the Italian tradition of the actor-author, just like Ettore Petrolini. The title of his first revue referred to that of a column in the Italian Communist Party (PCI) newspaper l'Unità. Il dito nell'occhio consisted of 21 sketches similar in style to Poer nano but dealing instead with a satirical history of the world. The last performance, in which Fo played a supporting role, was a box-office success and went on tour after 113 performances at Milan's Piccolo Teatro. 1953 also brought the beginning of Fo's songwriting. He collaborated with Fiorenzo Carpi; all of Fo's plays as far as 1967 would feature Carpi's music. "La luna è una lampadina" ("The moon is a lightbulb"), their first song, is one of Fo's most famous.

Fo met Franca Rame, daughter of a theatrical family, when they were working in the revue Sette giorni a Milano. They became engaged, and married on 24 June 1954. They had a son, Jacopo (born 31 March 1955), who would also become a writer.

With the break-up of I dritti due to financial failure, Fo and family moved to Rome where he hoped to gain work as a screenwriter in the cinema. There they lived next door to Roberto Rossellini and Ingrid Bergman. Fo worked on many productions, including those of Dino De Laurentiis. Rame worked in Teatro Stabile of Bolzano. In 1956, Fo co-wrote and acted with Rame in the Carlo Lizzani's film Lo svitato (The screwball), influenced by Jacques Tati, Buster Keaton and Charlie Chaplin. In the film, Fo plays "a disoriented hotel porter cast adrift in a neo-capitalist Milan of skyscrapers and modern technology". Other films followed.

In 1958, the couple returned to Milan when Rame was offered roles in a series of farces at the Arlecchino Theatre. Fo and Rame were subsequently based there. Fo said, "For me the lesson of the cinema meant learning from a technical point of view what audiences had already grasped: a story divided into sequences, a fast pace, sharp dialogue, and getting rid of the conventions of space and time. Working on screenplays gave me an apprenticeship as a playwright and I was able to transfer the lessons of the new technical means to the theatre".

The foundation of the Compagnia Fo-Rame dates from this time. Fo wrote scripts, acted, directed, and designed costumes and stage paraphernalia. Rame took care of the administration. The company débuted at the Piccolo Teatro, and in 1959 began a series of six full-length plays that were performed each season at the Teatro Odeon. One of these, Gli arcangeli non giocano al flipper (Archangels Don't Play Pinball), brought Fo and Rame national and, later, international recognition. It would be the first Fo play to be performed outside Italy—in Yugoslavia, Poland, the Netherlands, Sweden and Spain. Other successes would follow.

=== 1960s ===
In 1962, Fo wrote and directed a variety show, Canzonissima, for RAI. Fo used the show to give Italians a glimpse of a type of television resembling the origins of theatre, far removed from the "junk TV" previously produced by the company. Canzonissima featured satirical songs and sketches depicting the lives of the working classes. However, it was frequently censored. One sketch featured a fat aunt who came to visit her nephew at his workplace (a canned meat factory) only to fall into a machine and come out as mincemeat, which the nephew retained in a cupboard at home and often displayed to friends: this led to complaints from canned meat producers and "industrialists in general"—though none from aunts, Fo later observed. Nonetheless Canzonissima proved popular, attracting millions of viewers, and Rame maintained that taxi drivers in Italian cities would often say they had no work during broadcasts as everyone was watching it.

The show's eighth episode—which referenced the dangerous conditions faced by workers on building sites—led to a dispute with the programme's producers, and prompted Fo and Rame to walk out on 29 November 1962. RAI maintained it would not broadcast the sketch as it risked further inflaming the annoyance of building workers' unions at working conditions. National uproar ensued over this censorship, with headlines in the daily newspapers and questions in the Italian parliament. RAI sued Fo and Rame and destroyed all the Canzonissima recordings. The dispute led to the effective banning of Fo and Rame from Italian television for 14 years.

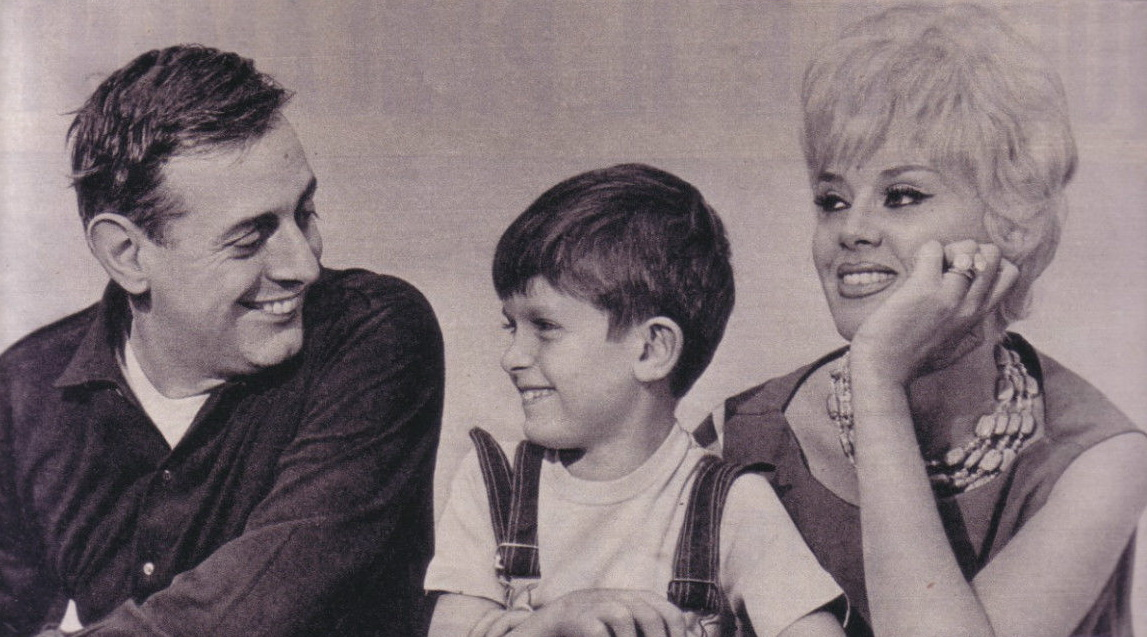
Fo with his wife Franca Rame and their son Jacopo

Fo returned to Milan's Teatro Odeon with the play Isabella, tre caravelle e un cacciaballe (Isabella, Three Sailing Ships and a Con Man), considered "an attempt to demystify and debunk the traditional history-book image" of Christopher Columbus. Fo said: "I wanted to attack those Italian intellectuals who, with the centre-left and the Socialist Party in the government, had discovered power and its advantages and leapt on it like rats on a piece of cheese. I wanted to dismantle a character who had been embalmed as a hero in school history books, whereas he is in fact an intellectual who tries to keep afloat within the mechanisms of power, play games with the King and be cunning with power figures, only to end up reduced to a wretch." Fo received threatening letters, was assaulted in Rome with Rame by fascist groups who also threw rubbish at them, while another performance was disrupted by a bomb scare. He later recounted this event in the prologue of Johan Padan and the Discovery of the Americas.

La signora è da buttare (Throw the Lady Out) was the final play Fo put on in the mainstream establishment Italian theatre. Performed in 1967, it contained topical references to the Vietnam War, Lee Harvey Oswald and the assassination of John F. Kennedy. The play prompted the first English-language piece of criticism on Fo's work by U.S. critic A. Richard Sogliuzzo in 1972. He interpreted the titular lady as "representing American capitalism [... and who just before her death] was elevated above a sink in a Statue of Liberty pose, and then ascended to a heaven packed with consumer goods". The U.S. government would later consistently deny Fo entry under the now-defunct McCarran-Walter Act.

Inspired by the events of May 1968 in France, Fo and Rame abandoned the official state theatre in Italy and set up Associazione Nuova Scena, a theatre collective operating outside the state structure. They asked the PCI for assistance and access to community centres and workers' clubs. In October 1968, they toured Fo's latest play Grande pantomima con bandiere e pupazzi piccoli e medi (Grand Pantomime with Flags and Small and Middle-sized Puppets), opening in Cesena. The play, which featured masks instead of characters—representing Capital, the Confederation of Industry, High Finance, the Church, the People, Rebels and Peasants—included a giant puppet representing fascism which gave birth to representatives of the Church, the Monarchy, the Army and Industrialism. L'operaio conosce 300 parole, il padrone 1,000: per questo lui è il padrone (The Worker Knows 300 Words, the Boss Knows 1000, That's Why He's the Boss), Legami pure che tanto io spacco tutto lo stesso (Chain Me Up and I'll Still Smash Everything) and Mistero Buffo (Comical Mystery Play), also date from this time. Though Fo himself had never been a Communist Party member, his open criticism of PCI methods and policies on the stage led to conflict with the Party.

=== 1970s ===
In 1970, Fo and Rame began their third theatre group, Collettivo Teatrale "La Comune" with the musician Paolo Ciarchi and the administrator Nanni Ricordi. They based themselves at an abandoned workshop (capannone) in via Colletta in a working-class suburb of Milan for three years, converting it into a sort of community centre and producing plays based on improvisation about contemporary issues. One such play was Vorrei morire stasera se dovessi pensare che non è servito a niente (I'd Rather Die Tonight If I Had To Think It Had All Been In Vain). Inspired by the Black September, with the title derived from a Renata Viganò poem, thousands of people came to see it.

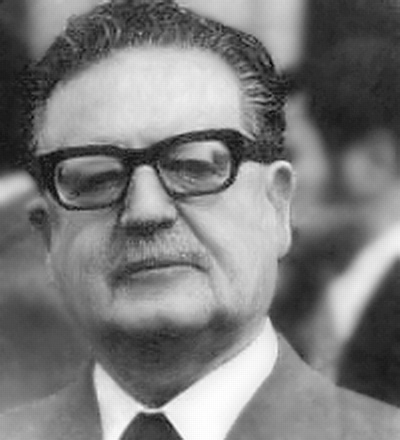
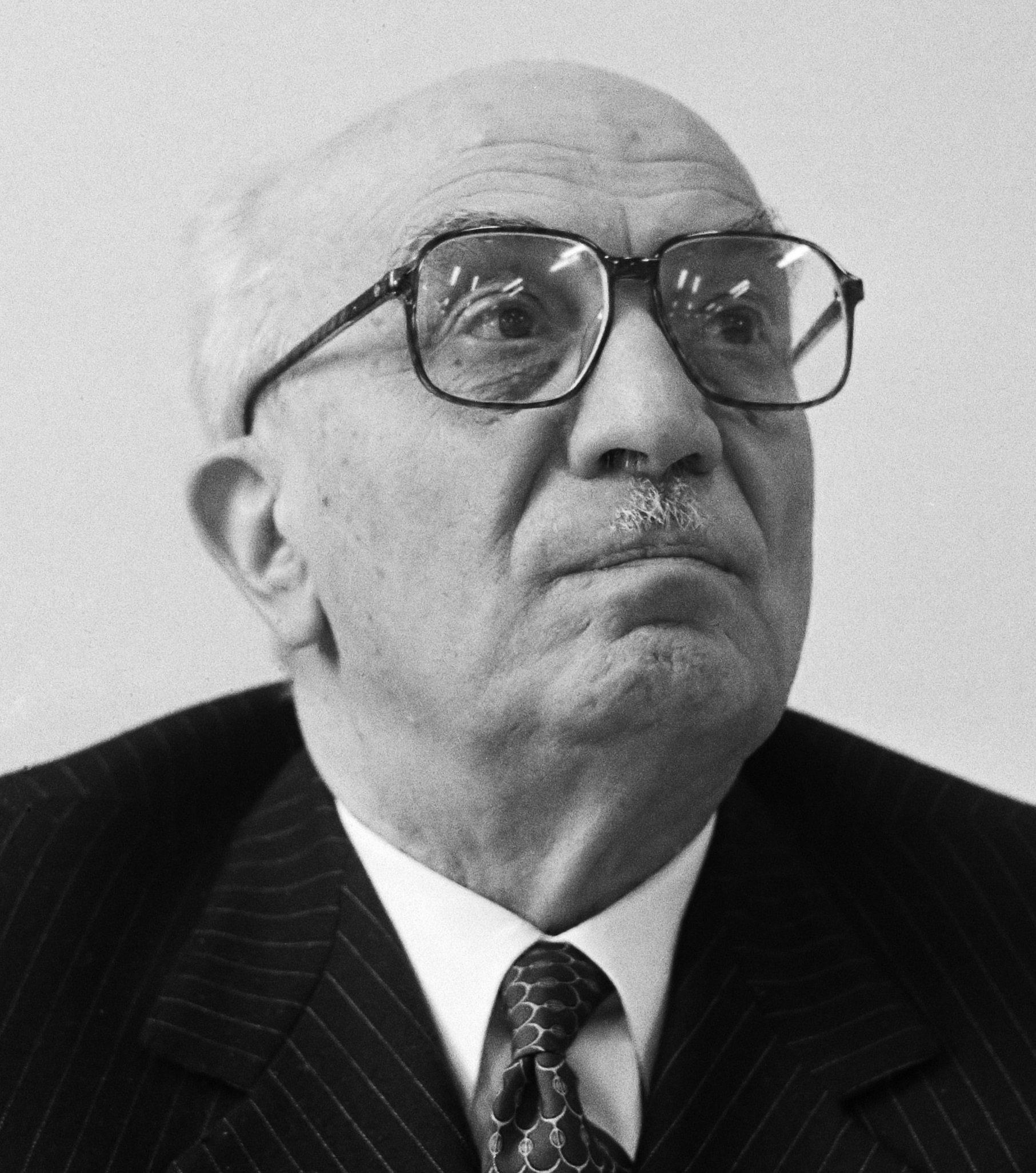
Left: Salvador Allende; right: Amintore Fanfani

What followed was Morte accidentale di un anarchico (Accidental Death of an Anarchist), Fo's most internationally recognised play, described by the playwright as "a grotesque farce about a tragic farce". It opened in December 1970, Fo having written it after the 1969 bombing at the Banca Nazionale dell'Agricoltura in Milan. This farce subsequently toured Italy with Tutti uniti! Tutti insieme! Ma scusa, quello non è il padrone? (United We Stand! All Together Now! Oops, Isn't That the Boss?), considered by Rame to be Fo's best work apart from Morte accidentale and Mistero buffo. Morte e resurezione di un pupazzo (Death and Resurrection of a Puppet) was an updated version of Grande pantomima. Fedayn, first performed in January 1972, it consists of a series of autobiographical accounts from Palestine.

In March 1973, five fascists, commissioned—according to some rumors—by high-ranking officials in Milan's Carabinieri, abducted Rame, held her at gunpoint and dumped her in a van. They raped her, beat her, burnt her with cigarettes, slashed her with razor blades and left her in a park. Fo and Rame continued to tour around Lombardy and Veneto throughout that year, despite a split in La Comune; the short piece Mamma Togni dates from this time.

In September 1973, after the suicide of Salvador Allende in Chile, Guerra di popolo in Cile (The People's War in Chile) was produced, and toured the country attracting great interest. This was particularly due to a part at the end that unnerved audiences, who thought a coup had been declared across Italy. According to Chiara Valentini, a member of the audience panicked during a performance in Turin and ate ten pages of what he thought might be compromising names, while in Merano a student broke the glass in an attempt to flee through a window. The actual police arrested Fo in Sassari in November 1973, leading to nationwide uproar when it emerged that under Italian law the police could not enter the theatre during the performance; the outcry served only to boost attendances at future performances.

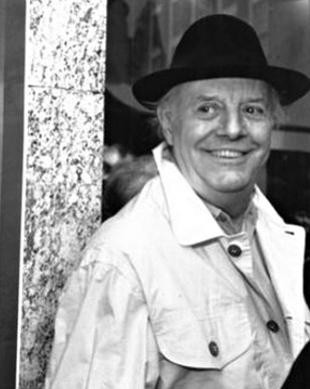
Dario Fo in 1976

In 1974, the company—which had now become Il Collettivo Teatrale "La Comune" diretto da Dario Fo—occupied and cleaned up an abandoned market building in Porta Vittoria (a working-class area of Milan) and dubbed it the Palazzina Liberty. Political enmities intervened however, and Milan's council tried to remove them by court order. The council was unsuccessful; the company was allowed to stay temporarily and set about developing facilities such as a library, conference centre, theatre and audiovisual workshops. They began performing with Porta e Belli contro il potere (Porta and Belli Against the Authorities), in which Fo read sonnets by the two titular 19th-century poets, described by him as "splendid texts, and when I recited them individually they worked marvellously, but not altogether in the same show."

Next came the farce, Non Si Paga! Non Si Paga! (Can't Pay? Won't Pay!), documenting the autoriduzione (self-reduction) movement which had developed during the severe economic crisis Italy was experiencing, and in which people would take what they wished from markets, only paying for what they could afford. Regarded as Fo's best-known play internationally after Morte accidentale di un anarchico, it had been performed in 35 countries by 1990. The title Can't Pay? Won't Pay! has also passed into the English language.

To the backdrop of the June 1975 Italian elections, Fo wrote Il Fanfani rapito (Fanfani Kidnapped)—a reference to Amintore Fanfani. Also in June 1975, Fo, Rame and other members of the company went to China—Fo later used his recollections of the trip in the monologue La storia della tigre (The Tale of a Tiger), with which he toured around Italy in 1978.

The same year (1975) Fo was nominated for the Nobel Prize for the first time. He thought the idea absurd: "I have become famous for my aversion to figures of reverence and genuflections of any kind. This Nobel business is a real comedy. I can imagine the look on the faces of certain state officials, magistrates and politicians I know. They take great pains to shut me up and clap me in handcuffs, and the Swedes go and play a trick like this ... [Receiving the prize] would be like acting in one of my plays."

Fo next turned to Italy's growing drug problem, summing it up as follows: "Rich people consume and use drugs, while poor people are used and consumed by drugs." La marijuana della mamma è la più bella (Mother's Marijuana is the Best) features a character called Grandpa who mistakenly swallows LSD instead of aspirin and hallucinates a farcical tram journey in his wardrobe ending at a police station. Fiorenzo Carpi returned to collaborate with Fo on the play's music, the first time they had worked together since 1967.

Fo returned to television in 1977 after 14 years off the air, RAI's administration having been changed following the previous year's general election. Fo was, however, limited to Rai 2, the second channel, which had a more socialist and non-religious slant than the more conservative Rai 1. Two cycles of his plays were broadcast; for political reasons these did not include Morte accidentale di un anarchico, Non Si Paga! Non Si Paga! or Il Fanfani rapito (although La Commune filmed them to have a permanent record of them). The Vatican still denounced Mistero buffo as "the most blasphemous show in the history of television". A new play for the TV series, Parliamo di donne (Let's Talk About Women), focused on topics such as abortion, sexism and the Holy Family.

A series of five monologues collectively titled Tutta casa, letto e chiesa (All House, Bed and Church) also first appeared in 1977, and were performed by Rame. The first, Il risveglio (Waking Up), featured a working-class mother talking to her baby (a doll). Una donna tutta sola (A Woman Alone) was about a housewife locked indoors by her husband who had to deal with a crying baby while fighting off the advances of his disabled, wheelchair-using, pornographic-film-obsessed brother, a man with a telescope, an obscene telephone caller and a former teacher who has fallen in love with her. La mamma fricchettona (Freak Mother) featured a mother taking shelter in a church confessional after leaving her family to pursue drugs and free love. The Same Old Story features a little girl with a doll who swears. The final monologue, Medea, based on an Italian version rather than the more famous Euripides version, had been performed in 35 countries by 1990.

=== 1980s ===
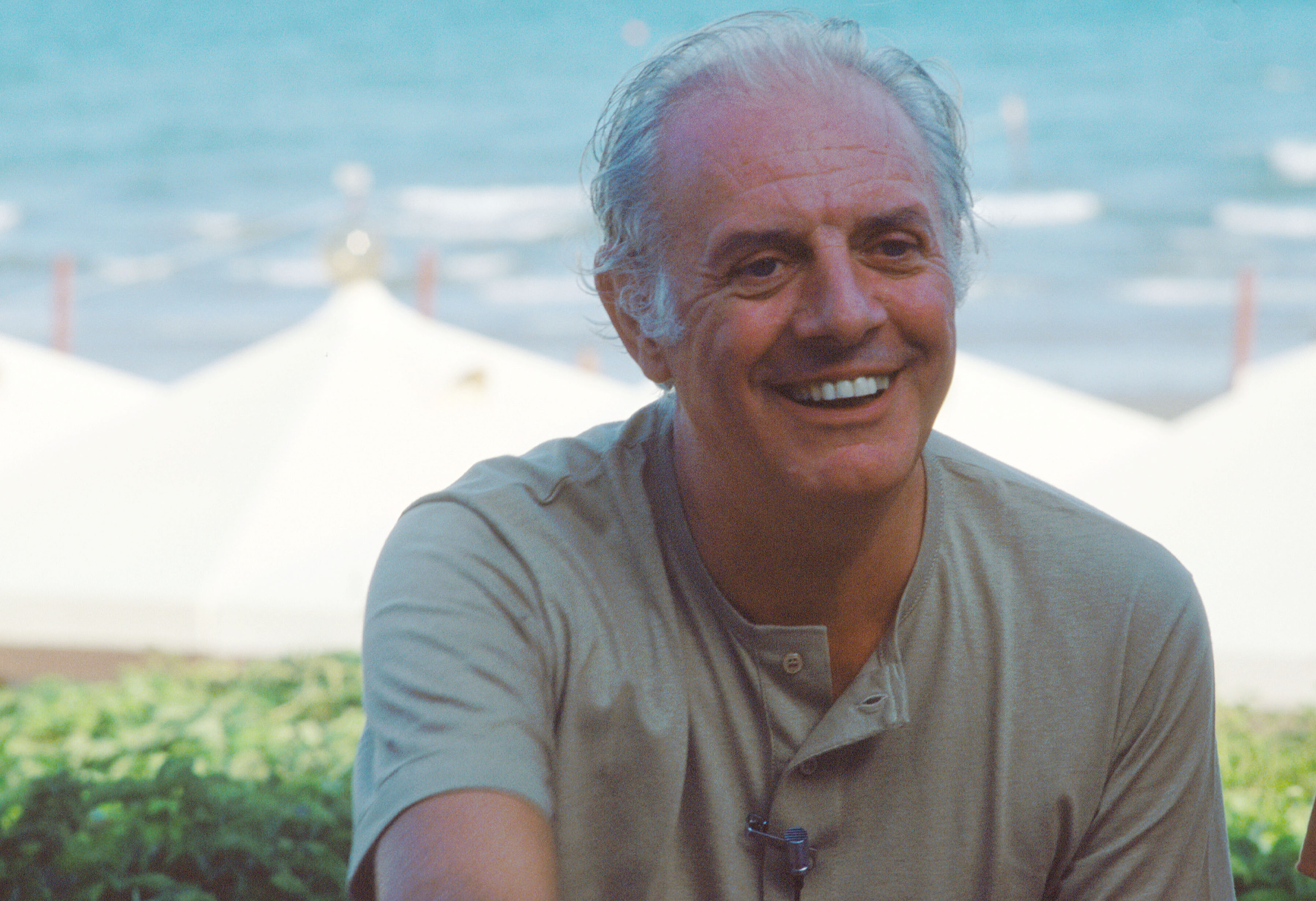
Dario Fo in Venice, 1985

In 1980, the United States authorities blocked Fo and Rame from performing at the country's Festival of Italian Theatre, an act which has been compared with the country's similar treatment of Bertolt Brecht, Charlie Chaplin and Gabriel García Márquez. In May that year, "An Evening Without Dario Fo and Franca Rame", held in New York, was attended by Arthur Miller, Bernard Malamud, Richard Foreman and Martin Scorsese. The event featured a reading in English of the first act of Non Si Paga! Non Si Paga! and a letter (read by Piero Sciotto) written by Fo and Rame. The American Theatre Critics Association sent a letter to the politician, Edmund Muskie. In December 1980, Fo was on stage in France for his own show untitled "Histoire du tigre et autres histoires" (Tiger Story & other stories).

In 1981, with La Commune having been evicted from the Palazzina Liberty, a second version of Tutta casa, letto e chiesa opened at the Teatro Odeon, the first time in 16 years that Fo and Rame performed there. Also that year (January) Clacson, trombette e pernacchi (Trumpets and Raspberries) was first performed at Milan's Cinema Cristallo, and was Fo's first new play since La marijuana della mamma è la più bella five years previously. 50,000 people saw it performed 34 times in Milan, and it had soon been produced in 15 other countries.

In 1983, Italian censors restricted Coppia aperta, quasi spalancata (The Open Couple) to audiences over the age of 18 when Rame included as a prologue her monologue The Rape (inspired by her own rape). Il candelaio (The Candlestickmaker), a monologue written by Fo in 1983, displayed Fo's increased interest in the English Elizabethan Theatre, and preceded Quasi per caso una donna: Elisabetta (Elizabeth: Almost by Chance a Woman), which Fo and Rame began work on in late 1984.

In September 1983, the U.S. authorities again refused Fo and Rame permission to enter the nation, and, to Fo's bewilderment, accused them of "belonging to organisations supporting terrorist groups." At this time Fo was the foreign writer whose plays were most widely produced in the United States. Famed producer Joseph Papp sent a telegram in their behalf to U.S. President Ronald Reagan, himself a former actor, but to no avail. Fo and Rame began a lawsuit against the U.S. State Department, pledging any damages received to sacked workers and occupied workplaces, the disabled, families of prisoners and other favorite causes.

Fo called a press conference in Milan to explain the grave offence U.S. authorities had caused himself and his wife: "We are Italian citizens who are supposed to have committed the crime of aiding and abetting terrorists in Italy. The Italian judicial authorities, however have never charged us or even made inquiries [...] nor have they accused us of any support of terrorism: in any case our position on the subject is well known. Now the Americans arrive on the scene and decide that we support terrorists, which means either that the Italian judicial authorities aren't doing their job or that they are in complicity with us."

1985 brought Hellequin, Harlekin, Arlecchino—based on Harlequin. 1986 brought Kidnapping Francesca, in which bankrupt banker Francesca Bollini de Rill has herself kidnapped to divert from her imminent arrest—adapted as Abducting Diana in 1994 by Stephen Stenning for English audiences. Appointed Professor of Drama at the University of Rome, the seminars Fo conducted there included ones on; Harlequin and the commedia dell'arte.

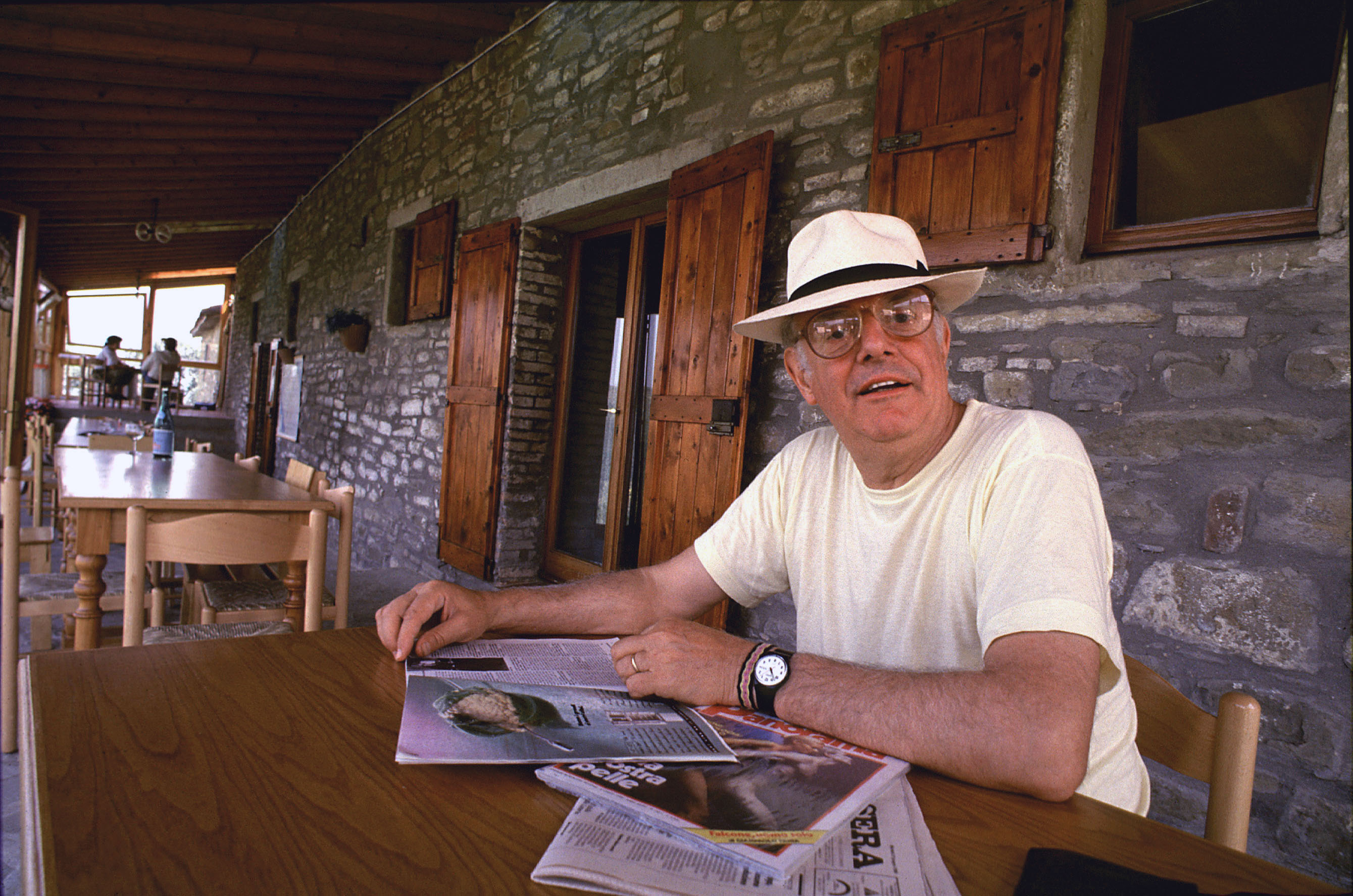
Dario Fo in Gubbio, 1988

The pre-Christmas 1987 performance of The First Miracle of the Infant Jesus on Italian television's variety-lottery show Fantastico led to further accusations of blasphemy from the Vatican; Fo portrayed the titular character deploying bolts of lightning to save other children from a bully. For the first time in 26 years, in April and May 1988, Fo and Rame collaborated on an original project, Transmissione forzata (Forced Transmission) on Italian television. Restricted to Rai 3, the series featured ironic songs about RAI censorship and Italian politicians, dancing girls and satirical news bulletins, a ballet on Palestine and a "weather report" on national rape statistics. Also in 1988, Fo returned to film acting for the first time since 1958, playing a retired professor in Musica per vecchi animali (Music for Old Animals).

In 1989, in solidarity with those affected by the Tiananmen Square Massacre, Fo updated La storia della tigre and wrote two monologues Lettera dalla Cina (Letter from China) and The Story of Qu. The same year, Fo also wrote Il ricercato (The Wanted Man), an unperformed play about the mafia, and Il Papa e la strega (The Pope and the Witch), which debuted in late October. The latter portrayed a Pope overcome both by a phobia of being attacked by children and by an attack of arthritis which leaves his arms raised in blessing, and who, acting upon the advice of a woman disguised as a nun and claiming to be a witch, swings from a chandelier and injects himself with heroin during his search for a cure, and avoids various assassination attempts involving a toy car, poisoned parrot and Brazilian nun. Critics praised its comic inventiveness and it won an award for being the play seen by most people in Italy that season.

=== 1990s ===
Addressing themes such as AIDS, the Gulf War and genetic experiments, Fo wrote Zitti! Stiamo precipitando! (Hush! We're Falling!) in summer 1990, and it debuted at Milan's Teatro Nuovo that November. Based on a graphic storyboard comprising original, autograph drawings, Fo created the monologue Johan Padan and the Discovery of the Americas. The titular character of Johan Padan, Fo's response to the 1992 quincentennial celebrations of the first voyage of Christopher Columbus to the Americas, is a Venetian fugitive who escapes from the Spanish Inquisition by joining the explorer and coloniser's fourth voyage. Forced to tend the animals on board, a storm casts him adrift in the ocean on the back of a pig until he reaches the coast and is rescued by the indigenous peoples of the Americas. A video recording of Fo's performance exists.

1993 brought an important anniversary of Carlo Goldoni; Fo, who was unimpressed, and, choosing instead to focus his attention on Angelo Beolco, planned a joint production between his company and Teatro dei Incamminati, a publicly funded company. However, with rehearsals well underway, a ministerial letter arrived to block the project's completion with "an obscure law forbidding co-productions between public and private companies."

Fo and Rame collaborated on the monologue Settimo: ruba un po' meno no. 2 (Seventh Commandment: Steal a Bit Less No. 2), inspired by the corruption scandals (Tangentopoli) which were rife in Italy during the 1990s. They later performed Mamma! I sanculotti! (Mummy! The Sans-culottes!), set in the eighteenth century but also making references to the Tangentopoli, and featuring music again by Fiorenzo Carpi.

For the 1994 monologue Sesso? Grazie, tanto per gradire! (Sex? Thanks, Don't Mind If I Do!), Fo and Rame worked with their son Jacopo to produce a performance based on Jacopo's 1992 book Lo Zen e l'arte di scopare (Zen and the Art of Fucking), featuring educational pieces on topics such as AIDS, contraception, sex education and sexual repression. Thus came Fo's first run-in with the new government of Silvio Berlusconi. Berlusconi's government banned Italians under the age of 18 from seeing it over fears, it said, that the play could "cause offence to the common decency which requires respect for spheres of decency, and provoke distress among adolescent spectators, with possible effects on their behaviour in relation to sex", thus defeating the original purpose of the performance. Much free publicity ensued, with the censorship issue being debated in the national parliament, teachers calling for it to be performed, and audiences and both Italian and foreign intellectuals signing a petition calling for the ban to be overturned.

On 17 July 1995, Fo had a stroke. He quickly recovered and was well again by his seventieth birthday on 24 March 1996. In summer 1996, he wrote Leonardo: The Flight, the Count and the Amours. Set in 1502, the titular character of the play was Leonardo da Vinci. In 1997, he wrote Il diavolo con le zinne (The Devil with Boobs). Described by Fo as "a Machiavellian comedy, a gigantic late sixteenth-century intrigue, with judges and devils, housekeepers possessed by devils, hermits, gendarmes, torturers and even a monkey", it featured an homage to Fiorenzo Carpi who had died earlier that year.

=== 21st century ===
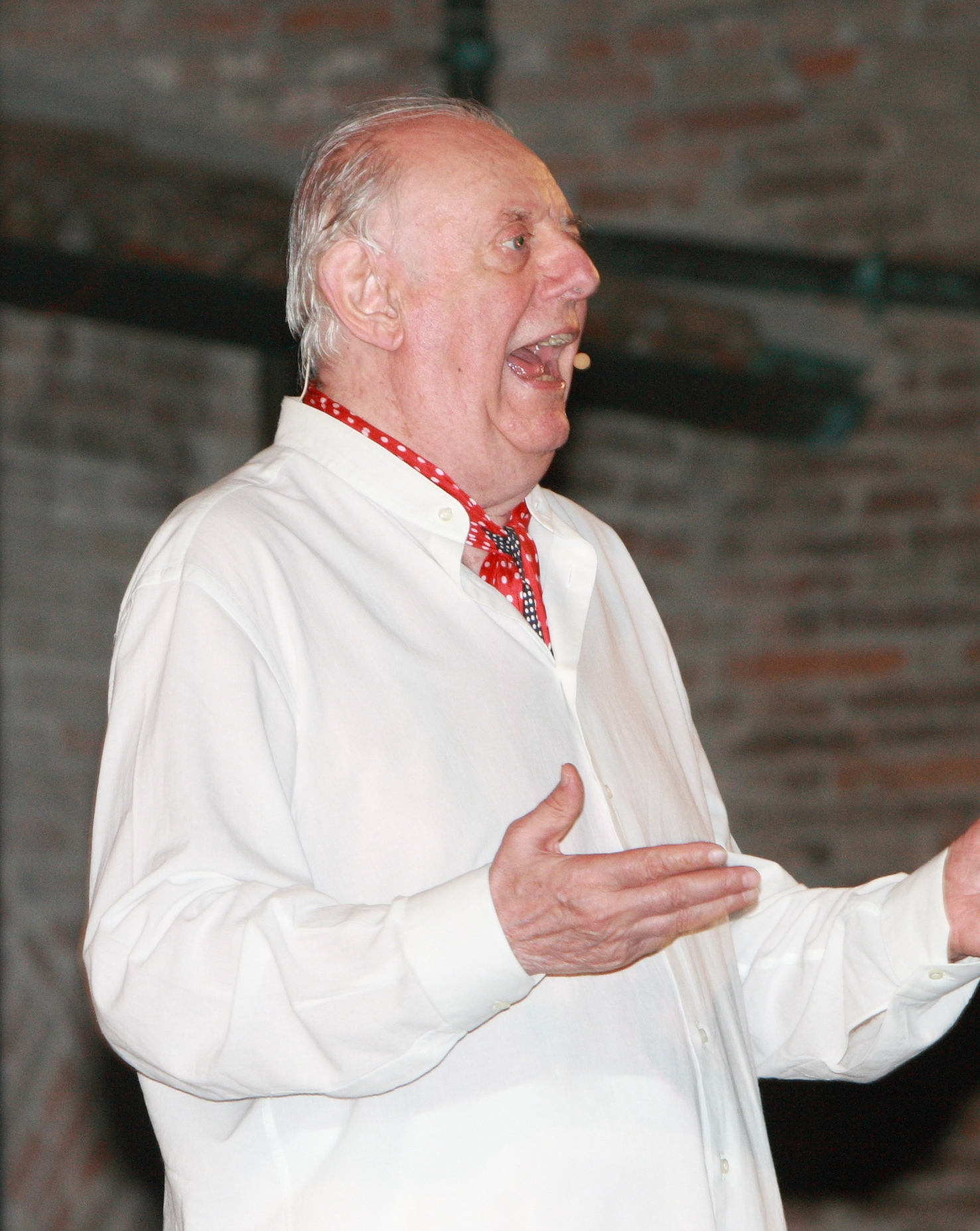
Dario Fo in Cesena

In 2001, Fo became Satrap of the Collège de 'Pataphysique. In 2004, Forza Italia senator Marcello Dell'Utri, on trial at the time for money laundering, sued Fo over references to him in his latest play. Fo was disgusted: "I have been doing satire for 40 years. It is paradox. It is grotesque." The play, titled The Two-Headed Anomaly and first performed in 2003, also poked fun at the shortness of then prime minister Silvio Berlusconi, had him strapped to a chair and given electric shock treatment and portrayed Vladimir Putin being shot dead by Chechen rebels while visiting Berlusconi's luxury villa in Sicily. The title refers to the subsequent transplanting of Putin's brain into Berlusconi's head, and the play was performed amid debate over Berlusconi's business and political interests and media censorship, with RAI having barred Italian satirists Sabina Guzzanti and Paolo Rossi from its television channels. Fo spoke of receiving threats from politicians if he performed it.

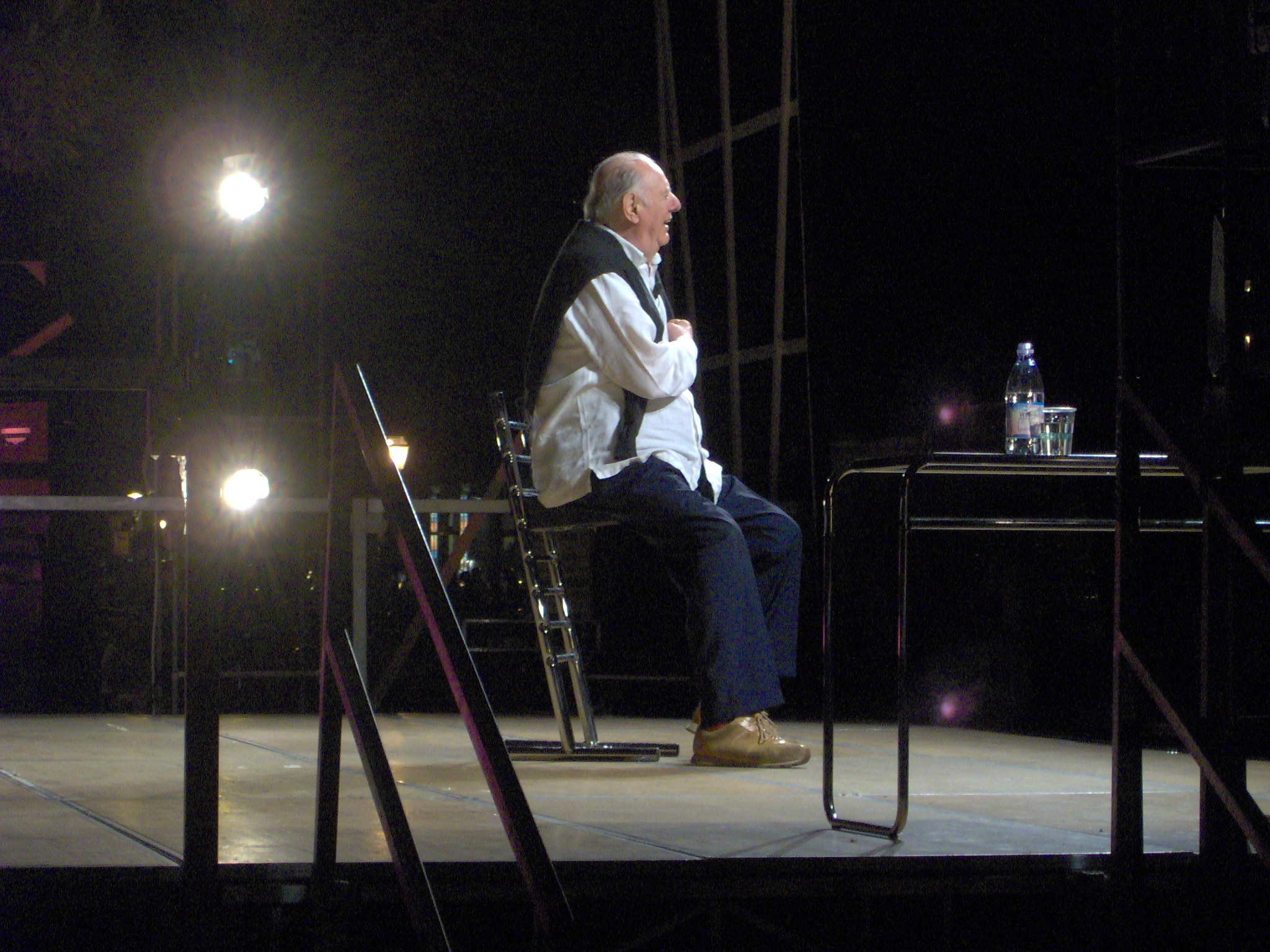
Dario Fo in 2007

In 2005, Fo revealed plans to run for Mayor of Milan, the most economically important city in Italy, the following year. He said it was part of his ongoing fight to rid Milan of Berlusconi's political colleague Gabriele Albertini, the incumbent mayor. Ostracised by Italian television (both state—RAI having shunted his latest show off to a graveyard slot—and commercial—three quarters owned by Fo's long-time adversary Berlusconi), Fo instead elected to campaign on stage. Under the slogan "I am not a moderate", he opposed the centre-right administration's plans to demolish parts of the city centre and vowed to chase out those "money-grabbing bastards who have run this city for decades". Securing 23.4% of the vote in the primary election of centre-left The Union in January 2006, he was ultimately unsuccessful, finishing second to Milan's former police chief Bruno Ferrante. In 2007, Fo rewrote the classic comedy Can't Pay? Won't Pay!, which went on tour starring Antonio Catania and Valeria Missironi; that same year, the play was published under the title Sotto paga! Non si paga!

Throughout the early 21st century until his death in 2016, Fo remained an active participant and campaigner on various political, social and cultural issues, most of all the populist Five Star Movement. He questioned the official accounts of the September 11 attacks and the collapse of the World Trade Center buildings in the film, Zero: An Investigation into 9/11. In 2008, he was among the signatories of an open letter to la Repubblica which called on the state to protect Roberto Saviano, whose life was under threat after exposing the clandestine activities of the Camorra in his 2006 book Gomorrah. Ahead of the 2013 Italian general election, Fo explained that the most recent targets of his satire included: "The banks mostly, and the big entrepreneurs. All those who hold the reins of 'the show within a show', i.e. those who – through the media, television and in other ways – make every effort to ensure that the people accept the conditions they find themselves in."

In 2016, he wrote his last book Razza di Zingaro, published by Chiarelettere and based on the life of the Sinti boxer Johann 'Rukeli' Trollmann, who was murdered in a nazi concentration camp. Dario Fo also produced a series of paintings dedicated to the boxer, exhibited in Milan Brera on the same year.

=== Death ===
On 13 October 2016 Fo died at the age of 90 due to a serious respiratory disease which had previously forced him to recover for 12 days in the Luigi Sacco hospital in Milan.

== List of works ==
- 1958 – Un morto da vendere (Corpse for Sale)
- 1958 – Non tutti i ladri vengono a nuocere (The Virtuous Burglar)
- 1959 – Gli arcangeli non giocano al flipper (Archangels Don't Play Pinball)
- 1960 – Aveva due pistole con gli occhi bianchi e neri (He Had Two Pistols with White and Black Eyes)
- 1961 – Chi ruba un piede è fortunato in amore (He Who Steals a Foot is Lucky in Love)
- 1963 – Isabella, tre caravelle e un cacciballe (Isabella, Three Tall Ships, and a Con Man)
- 1967 – La signora è da buttare (Throw the Lady Out)
- 1968 – Grande pantomima con bandiere e pupazzi piccoli i medi (Grand Pantomime with Flags and Small and Middle-sized Puppets)
  - Later updated as Morte e resurezione di un pupazzo (Death and Resurrection of a Puppet)
- 1969 – Mistero Buffo (Comical mystery)
- 1969 – L'operaio conosce 300 parole, il padrone 1,000: per questo lui è il padrone (The Worker Knows 300 Words, the Boss Knows 1000, That's Why He's the Boss)
- 1969 – Legame pure che tanto io spacco tutto lo stesso (Chain Me Up and I'll Still Smash Everything)
- 1970 – Vorrei morire stasera se dovessi pensare che non è servito a niente (I'd Rather Die Tonight If I Had To Think It Had All Been In Vain)
- 1970 – Morte accidentale di un anarchico (Accidental Death of an Anarchist)
- 1971 – Tutti uniti! Tutti insieme! Ma scusa, quello non è il padrone? (United We Stand! All Together Now! Oops, Isn't That the Boss?)
- 1972 – Fedayn
  - An Arab Woman Speaks (from Fedayn)
- 1973 – Mamma Togni
- 1973 – Guerra di popolo in Cile (The People's War in Chile)
- 1974 – Porta e Belli contro il potere (Porta and Belli Against the Authorities)
- 1974 – Non Si Paga! Non Si Paga! (Can't Pay? Won't Pay!)
- 1975 – Il Fanfani rapito (Fanfani Kidnapped)
- 1976 – La marijuana della mamma è la più bella (Mother's Marijuana is the Best)
- 1977 – Parliamo di donne (Let's Talk About Women)
- 1977 – Tutta casa, letto e chiesa (All House, Bed and Church, series of five monologues)
  - Il risveglio (Waking Up)
  - Una donna tutta sola (A Woman Alone, title changed to Adult Orgasm Escapes from the Zoo for a 1983 performance)
  - La mamma fricchettona (Freak Mother)
  - The Same Old Story
  - Medea
- 1977 – l'Uomo incinto (The pregnant man)
- 1978 – La storia della tigre (The Tale of a Tiger)
- 1981 – Clacson, trombette e pernacchi (Trumpets and Raspberries)
- 1982 - Tomorrow's News Today
- 1983 – Coppia aperta, quasi spalancata (The Open Couple)
  - Lo stupro (The Rape)
- 1983 – Il candelaio (The Candlestickmaker)
- 1984 – Quasi per caso una donna: Elisabetta (Elizabeth: Almost by Chance a Woman)
- 1985 – Manuale minimo dell'attore (The Tricks of the Trade, 1991)
- 1985 – Hellequin, Harlekin, Arlecchino
- 1986 – Abducting Francesca (adapted in English as Abducting Diana by Stephen Stenning, 1994)
- 1987 – The First Miracle of the Infant Jesus
- 1989 – Lettera dalla Cina (Letter from China)
- 1989 – The Story of Qu
- 1989 – Il ricercato (The Wanted Man, unperformed)
- 1989 – Il Papa e la strega (The Pope and the Witch)
- 1990 – Zitti! Stiamo precipitando! (Hush! We're Falling!)
- 1992 – Johan Padan and the Discovery of the Americas
- 1992 – Settimo: ruba un po' meno no. 2 (Seventh Commandment: Steal a Bit Less No. 2)
- 1993 – Mamma! I sanculotti! (Mummy! The Sans-culottes!)
- 1994 – Sesso? Grazie, tanto per gradire! (Sex? Thanks, Don't Mind If I Do!)
- 1995 – Leonardo: The Flight, the Count and the Amours
- 1997 – Il diavolo con le zinne (The Devil with Boobs)
- 2002 - Il paese dei Mezaràt (My first seven years (plus a few more))
- 2003 – The Two-Headed Anomaly
- 2009 – Francis the Holy Jester
- 2014 - La Figlia del Papa (The Pope's Daughter) (prose novel)
- 2015 - C'è un re pazzo in Danimarca (There's a mad king in Denmark)
- 2016 - Razza di Zingaro (Gypsy Race)

=== Date unknown ===
- Alice in Wonderless Land
- Housepainters Have No Memories
- La Marcolfa (Marcolfa, late 1950s?)
- La fiocinina (The Eel Woman)
- Fascismo 1922 (Fascism 1922)
- Michele Lu Lanzone
- Nadia Pasini
- Il tumulto di Bologna (The Tumult of Bologna)
- La parpaja topola (The Butterfly Mouse)
- L'opera dello sghignazzo (The Opera of Guffaws)
- La nascita del giullare (The Birth of the Jongleur)
- One was Nude and One wore Tails

=== English translations ===
- A number of Fo's plays have been translated into the English language, including Abducting Diana, and Francis the Holy Jester (Beautiful Books Limited, UK, 2009) by Mario Pirovano.
- Fo, Dario: Francis, the Holy Jester, Beautiful Books, 2009. ISBN 978-1905636716. translated by Mario Pirovano.

== Filmography ==
Year	Title	Role	Notes
1954	Red and Black	Writer	
1955	Scuola elementare	Typographer	
1956	Lo svitato	Achille	
1957	Souvenirs d'Italie	Carlino	Uncredited
1957	Rascel-Fifì	Pupo - il biondo	
1958	March's Child	Cantante in osteria	Uncredited
1958	Domenica è sempre domenica	The Silk Stockings Salesman	
1963	Follie d'estate	Gangster	
1989	Musica per vecchi animali	Lucio Lucertola	
1996	How the Toys Saved Christmas	Scarafoni	Voice
2002	Johan Padan a la descoverta de le Americhe	Johan Padan (veccho)	Voice
2016	Sweet Democracy		(final film role)
2016	La fantastica storia di Marc Chagall	Himself	
2017	Dario Fo e Franca Rame, la nostra storia	Himself	

== Awards and honours ==
- 1981: Sonning Prize from Copenhagen University
- 1985: Premio Eduardo Award
- 1986: Obie Award in New York (with Franca Rame)
- 1987: Agro Dolce Prize
- 1997: Nobel Prize in Literature
- 2001: Honorary doctorate from the Vrije Universiteit Brussel, Belgium
- 2002: Order of Saint Agatha by the Republic of San Marino
