= Ed Emery (writer) =

Ed Emery (born 1946) is an ethnomusicologist, writer, translator and political activist. In the 1970s, he was involved in political activist group Big Flame, and was one of the early organisers of the UK-based Ford Workers' Group. In 1976, he founded radical publisher Red Notes. He has translated key works by Italian playwright Dario Fo and political theorist Antonio Negri. As a writer, he has regularly contributed to Le Monde diplomatique and co-authored two plays with Richard Fredman, Les Juifs de Salonique and The Night Before Larry Was Stretched. In 2015, for services rendered in the left political movement, he was elected Honorary Member for life of the SOAS Student Union.

== Translations ==
As a result of his political activism, Emery has been influential in producing English translations of key works from the Italian Operaismo movement, including by Antonio Negri, Mario Tronti, Sergio Bologna and Romano Alquati and as well as Italian Communist Antonio Gramsci. He edited and translated "Italy 1977-8: Living with an Earthquake", a key text on Italian politics and the Operaismo movement. He continued translating Negri’s later works for Polity press as well as his biography.

Emery also established an archive of materials relating to the Italian Left in the 1970s, which is now kept at the British Library of Political and Economic Science at the London School of Economics.

== Theatre ==
Emery has also translated a number of works by Italian playwrights Dario Fo and Franca Rame. He was on-stage translator for Fo during his UK tour in 1982, and produced a book documenting the first UK performance of Franca Rame's play The Rape, published as Dario Fo and Franca Rame: Theatre Workshops at Riverside Studios 1982 through Red Notes. The book included transcriptions of theatre workshops held by Fo and Rame as well as two new translations.

Emery translated three Fo plays published in the collection which followed his 1997 award of the Nobel Prize in Literature: Mistero Buffo, Accidental Death of an Anarchist, and One was Nude and One Wore Tails.

== Journalism ==
After translating for the English edition of Le Monde diplomatique for several years, Emery also began writing for the paper on topics such as music, culture, poetry, and Middle Eastern politics.

== Music ==
From 2000-2015 Emery organised the annual Hydra Rebetiko Gathering devoted to Greek rebetiko urban blues music. He works particularly on Greek, Arabic and Kurdish music, with a particular focus on migrant musicians in Calais and Dunkirk. His work on maqamic music and on medieval Arabic and Hebrew music is reflected in ongoing conferences organised by The Free University, of which he is the founder and sole member.

== Academia ==
In 2000 he set up The Free University, an international conference-based network of colleagues researching a variety of topics. Under the umbrella of that university, and in conjunction with the History Department of the School of Oriental and African Studies (SOAS) he is the organiser of a number of international animal conferences on the history and future prospects of quadruped cultures around the world: for example, the Donkey Conference, the Camel Conference, the Elephant Conference and the War Horses of the World conference.

In 2016 he was appointed Research Associate at the Centre for Migration and Diaspora Studies at SOAS. As a co-author, he has been collected by libraries.
