= Jacopo Fo =

Italian writer-actor and director

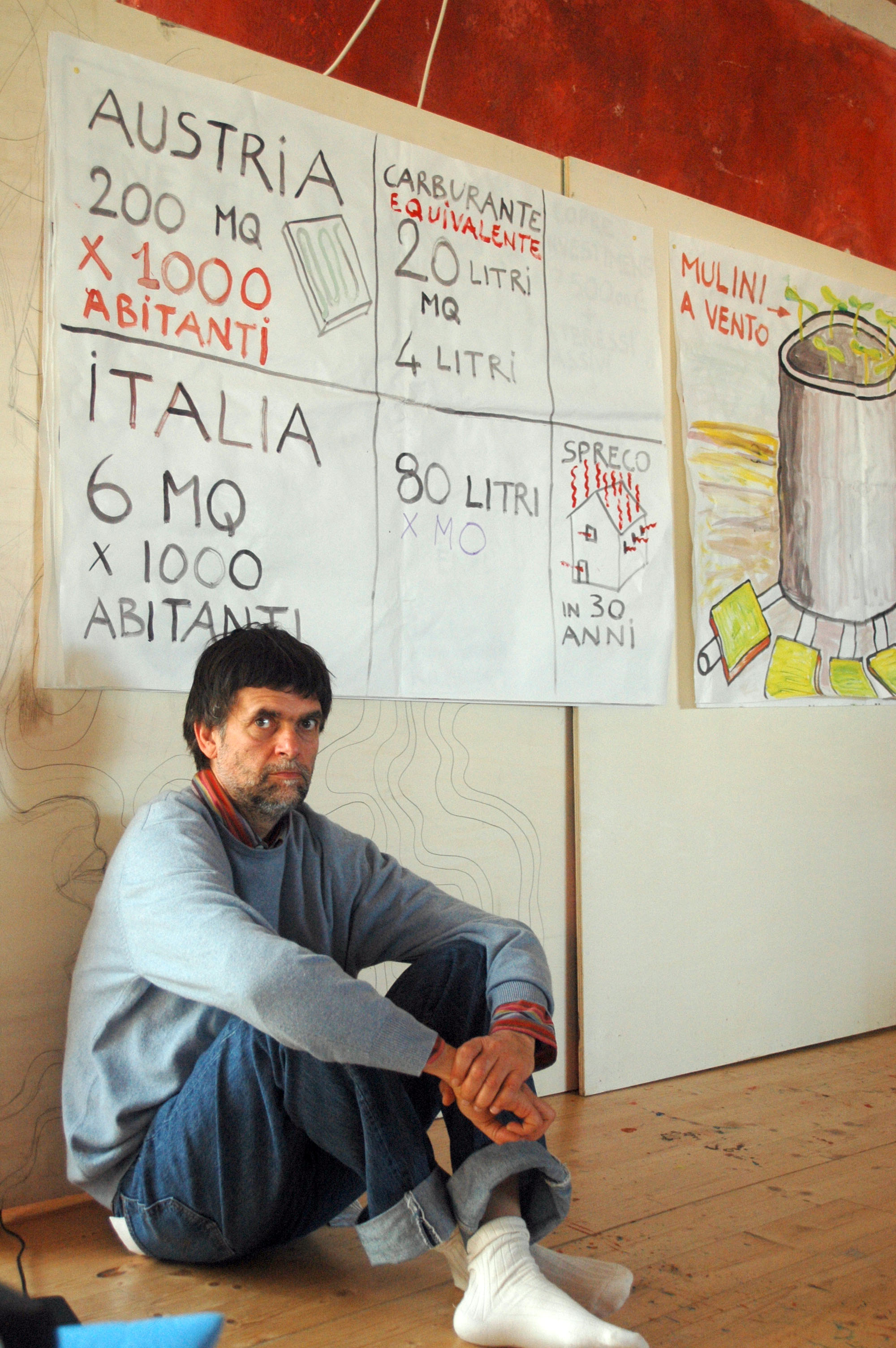
- Born: 31 March 1955 (age 71); Rome, Italy
- Occupations: Writer; actor; director
- Relatives: Dario Fo (father); Franca Rame (mother)
- Writing career
- Notable works: Zen and the Art of Fucking

Jacopo Fo (born 31 March 1955) is an Italian writer-actor and director. He is the son of playwrights Franca Rame and Dario Fo.

His 1992 book Lo Zen e l'arte di scopare (Zen and the Art of Fucking) sold more than 70,000 copies. It formed the basis of the 1994 monologue Sesso? Grazie, tanto per gradire! (Sex? Thanks, Don't Mind If I Do!), which Jacopo Fo worked on with his father and mother, featuring educational pieces on topics such as AIDS, contraception, sex education and sexual repression. The government of Silvio Berlusconi, recently risen to power, banned Italians under the age of 18 from seeing it over fears, it said, that the play could "cause offence to the common decency which requires respect for spheres of decency, and provoke distress among adolescent spectators, with possible effects on their behaviour in relation to sex", thus defeating the original purpose of the performance. Much free publicity ensued, with the censorship issue being debated in the national parliament, teachers calling for it to be performed, and audiences and both Italian and foreign intellectuals signing a petition calling for the ban to be overturned.

Jacopo Fo has in more recent times been prominent in the political campaign of Beppe Grillo.

== Works ==
- Il biforcuto. Dizionario di humour, violenza, sesso, politica e altre cose, Milan, Ottaviano, 1975.
- Se ti muovi ti stato!, prefazione di Giovan Battista Lazagna, Milan, Ottaviano, 1975.
- Fare il comunismo senza farsi male. La presa del potere e la manutenzione dello zen, Perugia, L'Altra Editrice, 1981.
- Andare a cavallo senza farsi male, Sommacampagna, Demetra, 1992. ISBN 88-7122-270-9.
- Diventare dio in 10 mosse. Manuale pratico di comicoterapia, Bussolengo, Demetra, 1993. ISBN 88-7122-275-X.
- Lo zen e l'arte di scopare, Bussolengo, Demetra, 1993. ISBN 88-7122-274-1.
- Il karamè. Lo zen e l'arte di spaccare la faccia agli imbecilli, con Massimo Capotorto, Sommacampagna, Demetra, 1993. ISBN 88-7122-349-7.
- La vera storia del mondo. Sesso, merda, generali e professori imbecilli. Falsi e censure nei libri di testo, Sommacampagna, Demetra, 1993. ISBN 88-7122-362-4.
- Sulla naturale superiorità della donna, Bussolengo, Demetra, 1994. ISBN 88-7122-405-1.
- Lo zen e l'arte di scopare 2. Pulizia finale, Bussolengo, Demetra, 1994. ISBN 88-7122-406-X.
- Fatture, tarocchi e malocchi, Bussolengo, Demetra, 1994. ISBN 88-7122-438-8.
- Come fare il buddista senza farsi male. Manuale di illuminazione zen ad uso dei viandanti, Bussolengo, Demetra, 1994. ISBN 88-7122-519-8.
- Parlare l'inglese come Toro Seduto, Bussolengo, Demetra, 1995. ISBN 88-7122-571-6.
- L'enciclopedia del sesso sublime, 4 voll., con 5 VHS, Bresso, Hobby & Work, 1996. ISBN 88-7133-258-X.
- Cervelli verdi fritti, Bussolengo, Demetra, 1996. ISBN 88-7122-931-2.
- '68. C'era una volta la rivoluzione. I dieci anni che sconvolsero il mondo, con Sergio Parini, Milan, Feltrinelli, 1997. ISBN 88-07-81417-X.
- Guarire ridendo. La medicina che non ha bisogno di ticket, Milan, Mondadori, 1997. ISBN 88-04-42787-6.
- Mamme zen, con Monica Traglio, Bussolengo, Demetra, 1997. ISBN 88-440-0226-4.
- Dio c'è e vi saluta tutti, Milan, Mondadori, 1998. ISBN 88-04-44960-8.
- La grande truffa delle piramidi. Le piramidi non le hanno costruite né i faraoni né i marziani!, Scritto, Nuovi mondi, 1998.
- Il diavolo ha i piedi per terra, Scritto, Nuovi mondi, 1999. ISBN 88-87554-01-3.
- La scopata galattica, Scritto, Nuovi mondi, 1999. ISBN 88-87554-02-1.
- Gesù amava le donne e non era biondo (Tutto quello che non ti dicono al catechismo), Scritto, Nuovi mondi, 1999. ISBN 978-88-8755-403-8.
- Ti amo, ma il tuo braccio destro mi fa schifo, tagliatelo! Storia della stupidità dalla Bibbia a oggi, Milan, Mondadori, 1999. ISBN 88-04-45780-5.
- La dimostrazione chimica dell'esistenza di Dio, Scritto, Nuovi mondi, 2000. ISBN 88-87554-05-6.
- Il mio angelo custode si è suicidato, con Davide Rota, Scritto, Nuovi mondi, 2000. ISBN 88-87554-06-4.
- Il libro nero del Cristianesimo, con Sergio Tomat e Laura Malucelli, Scritto, Nuovi mondi, 2000. ISBN 88-87554-09-9; 2005. ISBN 88-89091-28-2.
- Il computer per negati totali assoluti, con Alberto Cioca, con CD-ROM, Scritto, Nuovi mondi, 2000. ISBN 88-87554-12-9.
- Schiave ribelli, con Laura Malucelli, Scritto, Nuovi mondi, 2000. ISBN 88-87554-13-7.
- Operazione pace, con Laura Malucelli, San Lazzaro di Savena, Nuovi mondi, 2001. ISBN 88-900630-1-7.
- Il calzino che non puzza. La sogliola che finge l'orgasmo e altre meraviglie, San Lazzaro di Savena, Nuovi mondi, 2002. ISBN 978-88-900630-3-9.
- 22 cose che la sinistra deve fare e non ha ancora fatto, con Dario Fo e Franca Rame, San Lazzaro di Savena, Nuovi mondi, 2002. ISBN 88-900630-4-1.
- Ho 14 anni e non sono una stronza San Lazzaro di Savena, Nuovi mondi, 2003. ISBN 88-89091-01-0.
- Olio di colza e altri 30 modi per risparmiare, proteggere l'ambiente e salvare l'economia italiana, Roma, Nuova iniziativa editoriale, 2005.
- La società dei desideri, Edizioni Jacopo Fo, 2006. ISBN 978-88-8755-442-7.
- Per nessuna ragione al mondo, Edizioni Jacopo Fo, 2006. ISBN 978-88-8755-449-6.
- Morbide Galassie, Edizioni Jacopo Fo, 2006.
- Napoli nel sangue, Napoli, Voce delle Voci, 2006.
- Olio di colza, Palermo, Flaccovio, 2007. ISBN 978-88-7758-750-3.
- Non è vero che tutto va peggio. Come e perché il mondo continua a migliorare anche se non sembra, con Michele Dotti, Bologna, EMI, 2008. ISBN 978-88-307-1759-6.
- Pannelli solari gratis. [Come produrre energia senza un investimenti iniziale, un manuale per il risparmio energetico fatto in casa], Palermo, Flaccovio, 2008. ISBN 978-88-7758-829-6.
- Salvare l'ambiente conviene, Modena, Nuovi mondi, 2008. ISBN 978-88-89091-51-7.
- La corretta manutenzione del maschio, Parma, Guanda, 2009. ISBN 978-88-6088-271-4.
- Yoga demenziale. Il manuale definitivo della rivoluzione pigra, Roma, Fazi, 2009. ISBN 978-88-6411-055-4.
- Distruggete la Masanto!, Edizioni Jacopo Fo, 2010. ISBN 978-88-8755-440-3.
- Colora gli animilli, Edizioni Jacopo Fo, 2010. ISBN 978-88-8755-447-2.
- L'operaia nuda, il diavolo e la rivoluzione!!! Le avventure di Toni Barra investigatore privato per conto del sindacato metalmeccanici, Edizioni Jacopo Fo, 2010. ISBN 978-88-8755-448-9.
- L'erba del diavolo. [Vietare le droghe ingrassa la criminalità organizzata e fa aumentare i tossicodipendenti. Informare è meglio che reprimere], con Nina Karen, Palermo, Flaccovio, 2011. ISBN 978-88-7758-935-4.
- Angese. Il guerriero divertente. Breve biografia quasi autorizzata, Edizioni Jacopo Fo, 2012. ISBN 978-88-8755-450-2.
- Perché gli svizzeri sono più intelligenti, con Rosaria Guerra, Siena, Barbera, 2014. ISBN 978-88-7899-642-7.
- Com'è essere figlio di Franca Rame e Dario Fo, Guanda, 2019, ISBN 978-88-2352-440-8.
- La Bibbia censurata e altre storie di divinità immorali, Perrone, 2021, ISBN 978-88-6004-560-7.
