= Franca Rame =

Italian actress and politician (1929–2013)

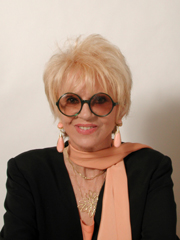

Member of the Senate of the Republic
- In office 28 April 2006 – 28 April 2008
- Constituency: Piedmont

Personal details
- Born: 18 July 1929 Parabiago, Kingdom of Italy
- Died: 29 May 2013 (aged 83) Milan, Italy
- Party: Italy of Values
- Spouse: Dario Fo (m. 1954)
- Children: Jacopo Fo
- Parent(s): Domenico Rame; Emilia Valdini
- Occupation: Theatre actress, playwright
- Website: http://www.francarame.it

Franca Rame (18 July 1929 – 29 May 2013) was an Italian theatre actress, playwright and political activist. She was married to Nobel laureate playwright Dario Fo and is the mother of writer Jacopo Fo. Fo dedicated his Nobel Prize to her.

== Biography ==
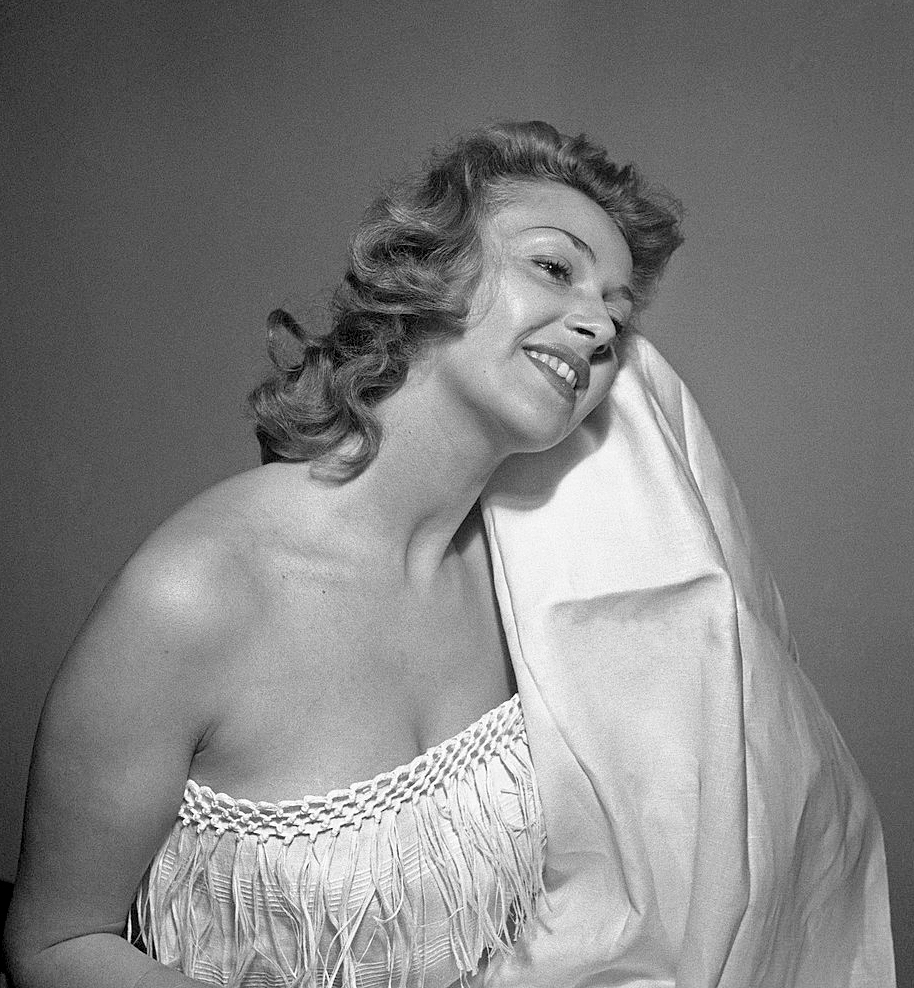
Franca Rame in 1952

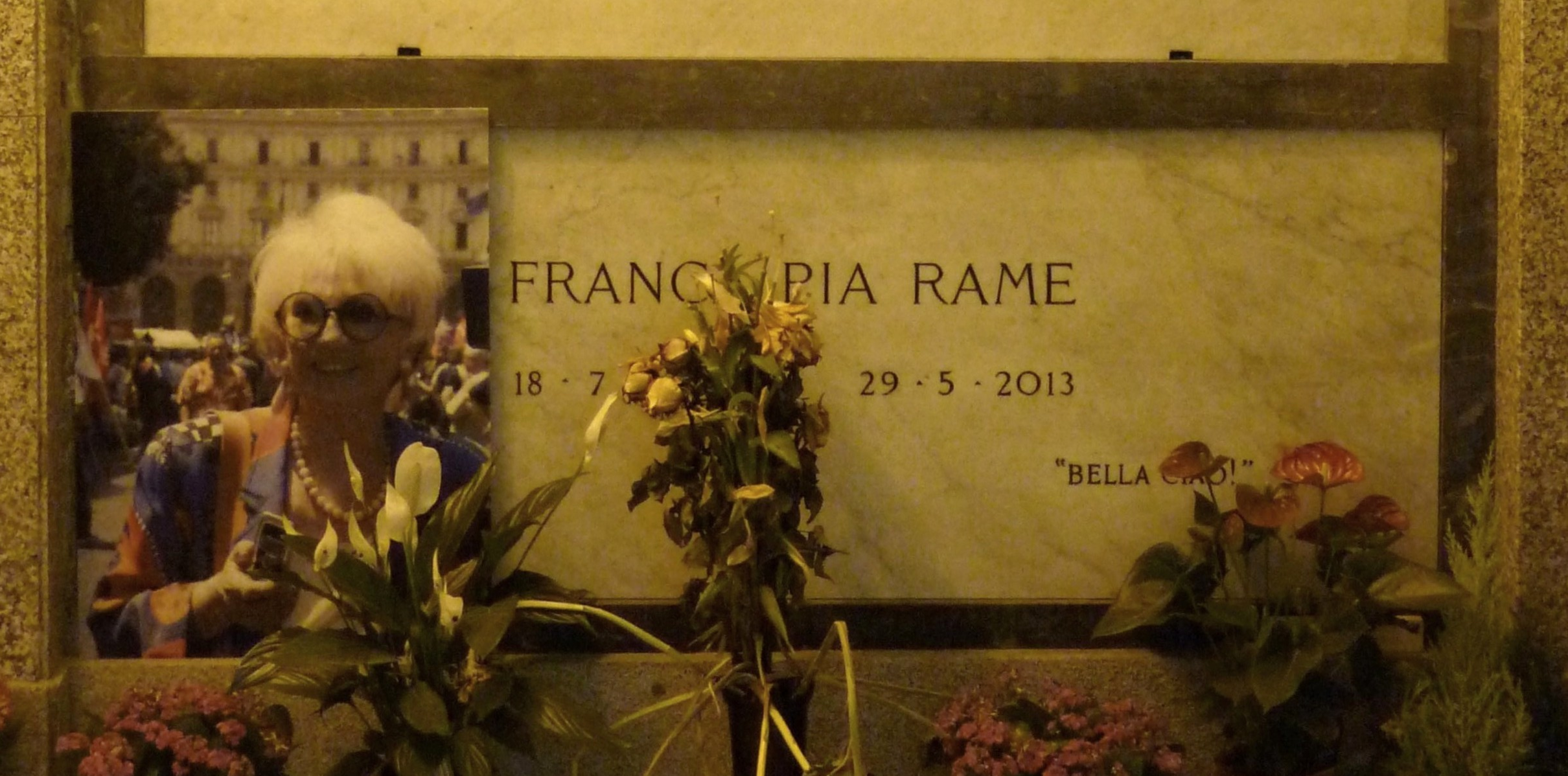
Franca Rame's grave at the Monumental Cemetery of Milan

Franca Rame was born in Parabiago, Lombardy, Italy, in 1929, into a family with a long theatre tradition. She made her theatrical debut in 1951. Shortly thereafter, she met Dario Fo, whom she married in 1954. Their son, Jacopo was born on 31 March 1955. In 1958, she co-founded the Dario Fo–Franca Rame Theatre Company in Milan, with Fo as the director and writer, and Rame the leading actress and administrator.

Rame continued working with Fo through many plays and several theatre companies, popular success and government censorship. She was active in Soccorso Rosso (Red Aid), writing letters and providing books for prisoners and assisting their families and lawyers. In the 1970s, Rame began writing plays (often stage monologues) of her own, such as Grasso è bello! and Tutta casa, letto e chiesa, which displayed a markedly feminist bent.

In March 1973, fascists who were reportedly commissioned by high-ranking officials in Milan's Carabinieri (Italian gendarmerie) abducted Rame, held her at gunpoint and dumped her in a van. They raped her, beat her, burnt her with cigarettes, slashed her with razor blades and left her in a park. She returned to the stage after two months with new anti-fascist monologues.

Rame became a member of the PCI in 1967. She was a member of the Italian Senate representing the centre-left anti-corruption Italy of Values (IdV) party. In 2006, she was designated candidate for President of Italy by IdV's leader, Antonio Di Pietro, but she obtained only 24 votes on the first ballot of the presidential election. From 2010 she was, also with her husband, an independent member of the Communist Refoundation Party.

She died in Milan in 2013, at the age of 83, and is buried at the city's Monumental Cemetery.

== Partial filmography ==
- Ha fatto tredici (1951)
- Poppy (1952)
- Lo svitato (1956)
- Rascel-Fifì (1957)
