= 1958 in Italy =

- Decades: 1930s; 1940s; 1950s; 1960s; 1970s
- See also: History of Italy; Timeline of Italian history; List of years in Italy

Events from the year 1958 in Italy.

== Incumbents ==
- President – Giovanni Gronchi
- Prime minister – Adone Zoli until july, Amintore Fanfani from july

== Events ==
- January 1 - the European Single Market enters into force.
- February 13: the government dissolves the city council of Naples; the former mayor, the monarchist Achille Lauro, is denounced for embezzlement.
- February 20 - the National Council for Economics and Labor enters into force.
- February 21 - the Italian Parliament recognizes the partisans who fought in the CVL as members of the Italian Army; the debate is disturbed by the riots and physical violences of the MSI deputies.
- March 1 - the bishop of Prato, Pietro Fiordilli, who had called two spouses civilly married "public sinners and concubines", is sentenced to a fine of 40,000 lire for defamation (the sentence is annulled on appeal). During the year, the interventions in politics of the Catholic Church often arouse controversy and charges of interference.
- March 13 - the Ministry of Health enters into force; Vincenzo Monaldi is the first minister.
- March 24 : the High Council of the Judiciary enters into force.
- May 1: activist Danilo Dolci has his passport withdrawn, because he would have defamed Italy abroad for its denunciations of poverty in Sicily.
- May 25 – general elections; Christian Democracy wins, PSI has a 2% increase, the right-wing oppositions (moreover the monarchists) collapse, PCI is stable, despite the 1956 crisis.
- July 1 – The Second Fanfani government led by Amintore Fanfani is sworn in; is compsoed by DC and PSDI, with the external support of PRI).Fanfani is Prime Minister and Minister of Foreign Affairs, and he retains the position of DC secretary.
- July 29 - with an official trip to America, Fanfani begins a diplomatic tour that leads him to meet with Eisenhower, Macmillan, De Gaulle, Adenauer, and Golda Meir.
- August 20: the scandal of the "banker of God" Giovanni Battista Giuffrè, breaks out; he was the author of a Ponzi scheme, which he promoted by exploiting his friendships in ecclesiastical circles.
- September 20 – the Merlin law, closing the state-run brothels, comes into force.
- October 9: pope Pius XII dies.
- October 28: the Venice patriarch Angelo Roncalli is elected pope, with the name of John XXIII.
- November 5: the Christian Democrat Silvio Milazzo is elected president of Sicily, against the official candidate of his party; expelled from DC, he founds the Social Christian Sicilian Union and forms a junta with a heterogeneous majority, ranging from MSI to PCI.
- November 26: the New York Times criticizes the neo-Atlantic policy of the Fanfani government, inspired by a greater autonomy of Italy from the United States, especially in relations with Arab countries; the newspaper calls the officials of the Italian Foreign Ministry "mau-mau".
- December 25: breaking with tradition, Pope John spends the Christmas holidays outside the Vatican walls, first in a children's hospital and then in a prison.

=== Disasters ===
- February 14: mining disaster in the Gessolungo sulphate (Caltanissetta); 14 deaths
- October 22 air collision in Nettuno; 31 deaths.

=== Crime news and gossip ===
- February 27: in via Osoppo (Milan), the "gang of blue overalls" robs the Banca Popolare di Milano armored cash van, with a loot of 114 million liras, without firing a shot. The police identifies and arrests the robbers in the following months.
- August 2: in Corleone, the doctor and mafia boss Michele Navarra is shot on behalf of his rival Luciano Liggio.
- September 11: in via Monaci (Rome) Maria Martirano is killed. In 1961, after a circumstantial process, the businessman Giovanni Fenaroli, victim’s husband, is sentenced as instigator and Raoul Ghiani as hitman.
- November 6: at the Rugantino restaurant (Rome), during a private party, the Lebanese dancer Aiche Nanà performs a striptease. The episode arouses a national scandal, and the stripper is convicted of obscene acts.

== Economy ==
The annual growth of GDP went from 1.3 to 2.9% and, for the first time in Italian history, industry surpassed agriculture in terms of the number of employees; it was the beginning of the economic miracle, which would last until 1963. The household appliances and cars industries drive the development.

A company union was formed at FIAT, the Free Democratic Workers, born from a split from CISL; it obtained a majority in the elections for internal commissions.

- 5 November: Fiat decreases by 15% the price of its small cars (Fiat 500 and Fiat 600); it’s imitated by the other car companies.
- 7 December: Prime Minister Fanfani inagurates the first section of the Autostrada A1 (Milan-Parma).
- 21 December: Intersind, the organization representing public industries in trade union negotiations, is constituted.

== Art ==
In Milan, the Torre Velasca (projected by BBPR studio) is achieved.

In Pompei, the Suburban baths are discovered.

== Culture ==
Alberto Mondadori founds the highbrow publishing house Il Saggiatore.

Fratelli Fabbri Editori publishes in installments the encyclopedia for the youngest ones Conoscere

Esperienze pastorali (Pastoral experiences) by don Lorenzo Milani is condemned by the Dicastery for the Doctrine of the Faith and withdrawn from circulation.

- The original structure by Emanuele Severino.
- Eros and the mysteries of love by Julius Evola.
- Morte e pianto rituale nel mondo antico (Death and ritual crying in ancient world) by Ernesto De Martino.
- L’opera di De Gasperi (Alcide De Gasperi’s work) by Palmiro Togliatti.

First issue of the magazines:

- Il contemporaneo, PCI cultural magazine.
- Problemi del socialismo, directed by Lelio Basso.

== Literature ==
=== Essays ===
- I viaggi e la morte by Carlo Emilio Gadda.

=== Fiction ===
The leopard by Giuseppe Tomasi di Lampedusa, published posthumously by Feltrinelli, is the greatest public success of the decade (70,000 copies sold) while dividing critics.

The other literary case of the year is If This is a Man by Primo Levi; ten years after its first edition, went unnoticed, it’s republished by Einaudi and discovered by critics and the public.

- Il ponte della Ghisolfa by Giovanni Testori.
- Viaggio col padre by Carlo Castellaneta.
- The Gold-rimmed Spectacles by Giorgio Bassani.
- Gli anni del giudizio by Giovanni Arpino.
- La camera degli sposi by Marino Moretti.
- Il soldato by Carlo Cassola.
- Le note blu by Brunella Gasperini.
- Gelsomino nel paese dei bugiardi by Gianni Rodari (for children).
- Mal di galleria by Giuseppe Marotta (short stories).

Important collections of short stories are published by Italo Calvino, Marino Moretti and Dino Buzzati (Sessanta racconti).

=== Poetry ===
- L’usignolo della Chiesa Cattolica by Pier Paolo Pasolini
- La terra impareggiabile by Salvatore Quasimodo.

=== Literary awards ===
- Strega Prize: Sessanta racconti by Dino Buzzati.
- Viareggio Prize : Ottavio di Saint Vincent by Tommaso Landolfi.
- Bagutta Prize: A passo d’uomo by Lorenzo Montano.
- Bancarella Prize: Doctor Zhivago by Boris Pasternak.

== Theatre ==
- I giacobini (The jacobins) by Federico Zardi, directed by Giorgio Strehler, with Tino Carraro and Luigi Vannucchi.
- D’amore si muore by Giuseppe Patroni Griffi, directed by Giorgio De Lullo, with Romolo Valli and Rossella Falk.
- Corpse for sale and The virtuous burglar, farces written and interpreted by Dario Fo.
- Un trapezio per Lisistrata, musical version of Aristophanes’ Lysistrata, by Garinei and Giovannini, with Delia Scala and Nino Manfredi.

== Cinema ==
- Dramas: … and the wild wild women by Renato Castellani, A man of straw by Pietro Germi, La sfida by Francesco Rosi (at his debut as director).
- Comedy: Big deal on Madonna street by Mario Monicelli inaugurate the great season of commedia all’italiana and reveals the comic skills of Vittorio Gassman. Other comedies: Girls for the summer by Gianni Franciolini, Young husbands by Mauro Bolognini, Mogli pericolose by Luigi Comencini, Venice, the moon and you by Dino Risi, Anna of Broolklyn by Vittorio De Sica (uncredited) and Carlo Lastricati.
- Period drama: two big productions with an international cast, Tempest by Alberto Lattuada (Lux Film) and The naked maja by Henry Koster (Titanus), are the box-office hits of the year.
- Peplum: Hercules by Piero Francisci and The warrior and the slave girl by Vittorio Cottafavi launch the sword-and-sandal phylon.

See also: List of Italian Films of 1958 and 1958 in Italian television.

=== Box-Office ===
The non-Italian films are omitted.

1. Tempest – 11,121 million viewers
2. The naked maja – 8, 507 million viewers
3. Big deal on Madonna street – 6, 497 million viewers
4. Hercules – 5,838 million viewers.
5. Girls for the summer – 4,646 million viewers.

=== Awards ===
Nastri d’argento: La sfida, Big deal on Madonna street and A man of straw (best films), Pietro Germi (best director for A man of straw), Vittorio Gassmann (best actor for Big deal on Madonna street)

David di Donatello: Tempest and The naked maja (best films), Alberto Lattuada (best director for Tempest), Anna Magnani (best actress for … and the wild wild women).

Academy awards: Nights of Cabiria by Federico Fellini (best international feature film).

Berlin International Film Festival: Anna Magnani (best actress for Wild is the wind).

Cannes International Film Festival: Young husbands (best script).

Venice International Film Festival: La sfida (Silver Lion), Sophia Loren (best actress for The black orchid).

== Music ==
- January 2: at the Rome Opera House, Maria Callas abandons halfway the staging of Vincenzo Bellini's Norma, in the presence of President Gronchi; the soprano, who justifies herself with a drop in voice, is protested and will no longer sing in Rome.

Carla Fracci becomes principal ballerina at La Scala.

In Spoleto, first edition of the music and theatre Festival dei due mondi, ideated by the composer Gian Carlo Menotti; it is inaugurated by Giuseppe Verdi’s Macbeth, directed by Luchino Visconti.

- Assassinio nella cattedrale by Ildebrando Pizzetti.

=== Pop music ===
- Sanremo music festival: Domenico Modugno and Johnny Dorelli with Nel blu, dipinto di blu.

The Modugno’s victory in Sanremo and the international triumph of his song revolution the Italian pop music, opening the way to the singer-songwriters and the “howlers”. Other successes of the year are Eri piccola così, by Fred Buscaglione, the parodic story of a femme fatale, and, in a more traditional and melodic register, L’edera, by Nilla Pizzi.

Birth of Cantacronache, the first Italian folk band; it released two albums, Cantacronache sperimentale and Cantacronache 1, with music by Sergio Liberovici and politically engaged lyrics, written, among others, by Italo Calvino.

Casa Ricordi becomes a record company, with the name Dischi Ricordi.

== Sport ==
- January 15: in Belfast, the Italy national football team is defeated 2-1 by Northern Ireland and does not qualify for the final phase of the FIFA World Cup, for the only time in the tTentieth century.

=== Italian championships ===
Serie A: Juventus; John Charles, Juventus, is head-gunner with 28 goals.

Coppa Italia: Lazio.

Cycling: Ercole Baldini.

Basketball: Olimpia Milano (male) and Società ginnastica triestina (female).

=== Italian victories ===
Cycling: UCI Road World Championships and Giro d’Italia: Ercole Baldini; Giro di Lombardia: Nino Defilippis.

Motorcycle racing: Grand prix motorcycle racing: Tarquinio Provvini (250 cc) and Carlo Ubbiali (125 cc).

Bobsleight: FIBT world championship: Eugenio Monti and Renzo Alvarà (two men).

== Births ==
- 1 January – Elisabetta Dami, children's books author
- 5 January - Monica Guerritore, actress
- 7 January - Miki Biason, rally driver
- 26 January - Alessandro Baricco, writer
- 2 February - Paolo Del Debbio, tv journalist
- 5 February - Fabrizio Frizzi, tv presenter, (d. 2018)
- 14 February - Stefano Masciarelli, comedian
- 21 February - Salvarore Cuffaro, politician
- 3 March – Gianni Alemanno, politician
- 6 March - Vittorio Agnoletto, activist
- 13 March - Silvia Ronchey, writer
- 24 March - Enzo Decaro, actor
- 26 March - Elio De Angelis, racing driver (d. 1986)
- 28 March - Valerio Fioravanti, child actor and terrorist
- 15 April - Riccardo Milani, director
- 25 April - Garbo, singer-songwriter
- 29 April - Giovanni Galli, goalkeeper
- 2 May - Giuseppe Dossena, fooball player
- 31 May - Massimo Carminati, criminal and terrorist
- 19 July - Alessandro Bergonzoni, actor
- 22 July - Nicola Gratteri, prosecutor
- 30 July - Orlando Pizzolato, long distance runner
- 3 August - Tito Boeri, economist
- 3 August - Augusto Minzolini, journalist
- 11 August - Silvio Soldini, director
- 13 August – Domenico Dolce, fashion designer
- 13 August - Tiziana Rivale, singer
- 16 August - Rocco Papaleo, actor
- 26 August - Nichi Vendola, politician
- 12 September - Franco Amurri, directore
- 22 September – Andrea Bocelli, tenor
- 26 September - Igort, cartoonist
- 28 September - Aldo Baglio, comedian
- 28 September - Lory Del Santo, actress
- 4 October - Francesco Damiani, boxer
- 5 Ocober - Antonio Di Gennaro, footballer
- 10 October - Carla Signoris, actress
- 19 October – Dario Franceschini, lawyer, writer, and politician
- 14 November - Francesco Pannofino, actor
- 28 November - Pamela Prati, showgirl
- 1 Dicember - Alberto Cova, long distance runner
- 10 December - Eva Robin's, transex actor

== Deaths ==
- 3 January - Alfredo Pizzoni, banker and partisan (b. 1884)
- 24 January - Carmine Senise, chef of the police (b.1883)
- 1 March – Giacomo Balla, painter (b. 1871)
- 8 May - Renato Cacciapopoli, mathematician, (b. 1904), suicide.
- 15 March - Giuseppe Romita, socialis politician (b. 1887)
- 1 June - Matteo Marangoni, art historian (b. 1876)
- 6 July - Luigi Musso, racing drivere (b. 1924), by an accident in French Grand Prix.
- 2 August – Michele Navarra, Italian Sicilian Mafia boss (b. 1905)
- 11 August - Enrico Pea, writer (b. 1881)
- 4 september - Raffaele Paolucci, physician, war hero and politician (b. 1892)
- 3 October - Cesare Giulio Viola, writer (b. 1886)
- 9 October - Pope Pius XII (b. 1899)
- 19 November – Vittorio Ambrosio, Italian general (b. 1879)
- 15 Novembre - Brnardino Nogara, financial advisor (b. 1870)

== Sources ==
- Cronologia Universale : dalla preistoria all’età contemporanea. Torino : UTET, 1979. ISBN
- Storia d'Italia: cronologia 1815-1990. Novara: De Agostini, 1991. ISBN
- I cinquantamila giorni dell'Italia Unita
- Storia d’Italia nel secolo ventesimo. Strumenti e fonti, care of Claudio Pavone.
- Film italiani 1956
