= 1956 in Italy =

- Decades: 1930s; 1940s; 1950s; 1960s; 1970s
- See also: History of Italy; Timeline of Italian history; List of years in Italy

Events from the year 1956 in Italy

== Incumbents ==
President – Giovanni Gronchi

Prime minister – Antonio Segni

== Events ==
- January 25 – February 5: in Cortina d’Ampezzo, 1956 winter Olympics. For the first time, Italy hosts the Olympic Games.
- February: an extraordinary wave of cold and snow, the second for intensity in the Twentieth century, strikes the whole Italy.
- February 2: in Partinico the activist Danilo Dolci and 19 laborers are arrested for a “reverse strike” (they cleared an uncultivated land in protest). In the year, there are in Southern Italy several clashes between laborers and police, with 4 dead.
- February 16: Minister of budget Ezio Vanoni dies from a heart attack, during a debate in the Italian Senate about the economic situation.
- February 26-March 14: Giovanni Gronchi is the first Italian head of state to visit USA and Canada.
- April 21: first issue of the tabloid Il giorno, directed by Gaetano Baldacci. The new daily newspaper, politically of center-left, is covertly financed by ENI.
- April 22: the PCI deputy Francesco Moranino, escaped in Prague, is sentenced in absentia to life imprisonment for crimes committed during the Resistance; he's the first MP condemned by a tribunal in the history of Italian Republic.
- April 23: first session and first sentence of the Constitutional Court, presided by Enrico De Nicola; it abrogates an illiberal article of the Penal code.
- May 27; local elections
- June 13: in an interview to Nuovi Argomenti, Palmiro Togliatti comments the publication of Khruschev's secret speech; the PCI secretary criticize the cult of personality but expresses several doubts about the de-Stalinization politicy.
- August 25: in Pralognan-la-Vanoise, Pietro Nenni and Giuseppe Saragat meets together; the two Socialist leaders discuss about a rapprochement and eventual reunification of PSI and PSDI.
- October 25: the Hungarian revolution divides the Italian left. The Communist party approves the Russian intervention, that is instead condemned by CGIl, included the communist secretary Giuseppe Di Vittorio (October 27) and by the Socialist Party (November 1)
- October 29: a manifest signed by 101 Communist intellectuals expresses strong dissent by the PCi position about the Hungarian revolution.
- November 24–27: in Milan, at the fifth MSI congress, the radical current Ordine Nuovo, headed by Pino Rauti, leaves the party.
- November 26: a secret agreement between CIA and Italian secret services creates the stay-behind organization Gladio.

=== Catastrophes ===
- July 26: SS Andrea Doria's sinking; 55 dead.
- August 8: Marcinelle mining disaster: 237 dead (139 Italians)
- December 22: Monte Giner air crash: 21 dead

=== Crime news ===
- October 10: In Terrazzano two lunatics, the brothers Santato, take hostage for a day, in a primary school, 97 children and three schoolmistresses; the children are saved by the sacrifice of a volunteer, the worker Sante Zennaro, killed by the police's friendly fire.

== Economy ==
The Vanoni plan for the development of Italian economy, Keynesian in nature, is abandoned after the death of his promoter. Yet, the Prime minister Antonio Segni and the DC secretary Amintore Fanfani support a policy of public intervention, breaking with the liberalism of the former cabinets.

- February 28: the three employers’ organization, Confindustria, Confcommercio and Confagricoltura constitute a coordination committee, Confintesa.
- December 22: the State Holding Ministry is instituted.

== Art ==
- Amalasunta su sfondo verde (Osvaldo Licini)
- Negativo-positivo (Bruno Munari)

== Culture ==
- Le origini del fascismo (Fascism's origins) by Paolo Alatri
- Critica e poesia (Critic and poetry) by Mario Fubini

First issue of the magazines

- Il Verri (directed by Luciano Anceschi), organ of the Milan neoavanguardia;
- Il Regn, catholic magazine
- Tempo presente (directed by Ignazio Silone and Nicola Chiaromonte), expression of the left wing anti-Communism.

== Literature ==
=== Essays ===
- Those cursed Tuscans by Curzio Malaparte.
- Il futuro ha un cuore antico by Carlo Levi (travel book in Russland)
- The miners of the Maremma by Carlo Cassola and Luciano Bianciardi.
- Salt in the wound by Leonardo Sciascia

=== Fiction ===
- Luca's secret by Ignazio Silone
- A prospect of Ferrara by Giorgio Bassani.
- Italian folktales by Italo Calvino.
- La casa di via Valadier by Carlo Cassola.
- Farfalla di Dinard, short stories by Eugenio Montale

=== Poetry ===
- The storm and other things by Eugenio Montale.
- Fuochi fatui by Camillo Sbarbaro.
- Versi e poesie by Giacomo Noventa.
- Una strana gioia di viviere by Sandro Penna.
- The false and true green by Salvatore Quasimodo.

=== Literary awards ===
- Strega Prize: A prospect of Ferrara (Giorgio Bassani)
- Viareggio Prize: Le parole sono pietre by Calo Levi and La sparviera by Gianna Manzini.
- Bagutta Prize:Rosso sul lago by Giuseppe Lanza.
- Bancarella Prize: A Many-splendoured Thing by Han Suyin.

== Theatre ==
- Buonanotte Bettina – musical comedy by Garinei and Giovannini, with Walter Chiari and Delia Scala.
- I tromboni (The windbags) – satirical review by Federico Zardi, with Vittorio Gassman.

== Cinema ==
In 1956, Italian cinema was in a phase of transition. Auteur and socially engaged cinema is almost limited to only two titles: The roof, by Vittorio De Sica, considered the last neorealist film, and The railroad man, a family drama directed and interpreted by Pietro Germi.

Most of the Italian production belongs the popular genres.

- Romantic comedy: Poveri ma belli by Dino Risi, a love triangle among three young Roman commoners, is the greatest public success of the year Other films: Donatella by Mario Monicelli, The Monte Carlo story, by Samuel A. Taylor, Lucky to be a woman by Alessndro Blasetti.
- Comic movie: Totò is at the height of his popularity and has the starring role in four films, all by Camillo Mastrocinque (Totò lascia o raddoppia? Totò Peppino and the hussy, The band of honest men, Totò, Peppino and the outlaws). Alberto Sordi carries on his ascent with Guardia, guardia scelta, brigadiere e maresciallo and Nero's mistress, instead the attempt to bring Dario Fo's bewildered humour to the big screen, (Lo svitato by Carlo Lizzani), gets little success.
- Melodramas: Rice girl (by Raffello Matarazzo), The awakening by Mario Camerini. The musical melodramas, such as Guaglione by Giorgio Simonelli, Mermaid of Naples by Luigi Capuano and Canzone proibita by Flavio Calzavara, despite their modest artistic level, achieved great commercial success, especially in southern Italy.
- Period dramas: Michele Strogoff by Carmine Gallone, Le schiave di Cartagine by Guido Brignone, Beatrice Cenci by Riccardo Freda.

=== Box office ===
The non-Italian films are omitted.

1. Poveri ma belli - 6,789 million viewiers
2. The railroad man - - 5,517 million viewiers
3. Michele Strogoff - 5.067 million viewiers
4. Guaglione - 4, 968 million viewiers
5. Totò, Peppino and the hussy - 4,644 million viewiers

=== Awards ===
Nastri d’argento: The Railroad man (best film), Pietro Germi (Best director, for The railroad man), Anna Magnani (Best actress, for The awakening),

First edition of David di Donatello

Academy awards: Anna Magnani (Best actress for The Rose Tattoo)

Berlin International Film Festival : Elsa Martinelli (Best actress for Donatella)

== Music ==
- Dialogues by Gian Francesco Malipiero
- Il canto sospeso by Luigi Nono.

=== Pop music ===
The year sees the success of the Neapolitan songs by Aurelio Fierro (Guaglione), Renato Carosone (Tu vuo fa’ l’americano) and Domenico Modugno (Io, mammeta e tu) dealing with the topics of love and youth without sentimentality but with lively music and ironic lyrics.

- Sanremo music festival: Franca Raimondi with Aprite le finestre

== Science ==
Oreste Piccioni proves the existence of antineutron.

== Sport ==
=== Italian championships ===
- Serie A: Fiorentina; Gino Pivatelli, Bologna, is head-gunner with 29 goals
- Cycling: Giorgio Albani
- Basketball: Virtus Bologna (male) and Società Ginnastica Triestina (Female)

=== Italian victories ===
- Cycling: UCI track cycling world championship: Antonio Maspes (sprint) and Guido Messina (Individual pursuit).
- Boxing: World bantamweight champion: Mario D'Agata
- Auto racing Mille Miglia: Eugenio Castellotti on Ferrari.
- Motorcycle racing: Grand prix motorcycle racing Carlo Ubbiali (both 125 and 250 cc)

==== Gold medals ====
At the 1956 Winter Olympics, Italy gets 1 gold and 2 silver medals (all male).

- Bobsleigh: Lamberto Dalla Costa and Giacomo Conti.(two men)

At the 1956 Summer Olympics, Italy gets 8 gold, 8 silver and 9 bronze medals (all male).

- Cycling; Leandro Faggin (1000 m time trial);;4000 m team pursuit; Ercole Baldini (Road race)
- Fencing: Carlo Pavesi (Epée individual); Foil and Epée teams.
- Rowing: cowed fours.
- Shooting: Galliano Rossini (Trap shooting)

== Births ==
- 3 January: Gioele Dix, actor
- 19 January: Fiordaliso, singer
- 5 February: Andrea Vitali, writer
- 20 February: Giulio Scarpati, actor
- 2 March: Carlo Mazzacurati, director (d. 2014)
- 5 March: Marco Paolini, actor
- 25 March: Federico Rampini, journalist
- 18 April: Roberto Calderoli, politician
- 26 April: Giacomo Poretti, comic actor
- 3 May: Carlo Rovelli: physicist
- 8 May: Cristina Comencini, film director
- 12 May: Evaristo Beccalossi, football player (d. 2026)
- 23 May: Andrea Pazienza, cartoonist (d. 1988)
- 27 May: Giuseppe Tornatore, director
- 30 May:Piero Chiambretti, TV presenter
- 30 May:David Sassoli, journalist and politician (d. 2022)
- 3 June: Elisabetta Gardini, actress and politician
- 6 June: Marco Minniti, politician
- 11 June: Giobbe Covatta, stand-up comedian.
- 26 June: Davide Ferrario, film director.
- 18 July: Maurizio Gasparri, politician.
- 19 July: Veronica Lario, actress and Silvio Berlusconi's wife.
- 22 July: Massimo Carlotto, writer.
- 28 July: Luca Barbareschi, actor.
- 7 August: Gerry Scotti, TV presenter.
- 13 August: Bruno Giordano, football player.
- 19 August: Sergio Brio, football player.
- 21 August: Laura Morante, actress.
- 10 September: Giancarlo Galan, politician.
- 23 September: Paolo Rossi, football player (d. 2020).
- 6 October: Bruno Nockler, alpine skier (d. 1982)
- 11 October: Edoardo Albinati, writer.
- 13 October: Oliviero Diliberto, politician.
- 19 October: Carlo Urbani, microbiologist, (d. 2003)
- 26 November: Alessandro Momo, actor (d. 1974).
- 28 November: Giovanni Ramponi, professor
- 23 December: Michele Alboreto, racing driver (d. 2001)
- 26 December: Beppe Severgnini, journalist.

== Deaths ==
- January 12: Domenico Giuliotti, writer (b. 1877)
- January 22: Giuseppe Musolino, brigand (b. 1876)
- January 22: Renato Ricci, fascist politician, (b. 1896)
- February 15: Paolo Buzzi, writer, (b. 1874)
- February 16: Ezio Vanoni, economist and politician (b. 1903)
- February 28: Carlo Gnocchi, priest and philantophist, (b. 1902)
- March 1: Eugenio (Israel) Zolli, rabbi, (b. 1881)
- April 2: Filippo De Pisis, painter, (B. 1896)
- June 11: Corrado Alvaro, writer (b. 1895)
- June 17: Enrico Prampolini, artist, (b. 1894)
- June 30: Alfredo Ferrari, engineer, (b. 1932)
- July 8: Giovanni Papini, writer, (b. 1881)
- August 12: Giampiero Combi, football player, (b. 1902)
- August 23: Galileo Chini, artist, (b. 1873)
- September 26: Pietro Calamandrei jwriter, urist and politician.(b. 1881)
- October 12; Lorenzo Perosi, priest and composer, (b. 1872)
- November 1: Pietro Badoglio, general and Prime Minister.(b. 1871)
- November 22: Pier Maria Rosso di San Secondo, playwright, (b. 1887)

== Sources ==
- Cronologia Universale : dalla preistoria all’età contemporanea. Torino : UTET, 1979. ISBN 88-02-03468-0
- Storia d'Italia: cronologia 1815-1990. Novara: De Agostini, 1991. ISBN 88-402-9440-6
- I cinquantamila giorni dell'Italia Unita
- Storia d’Italia nel secolo ventesimo. Strumenti e fonti, care of Claudio Pavone.
- Film italiani 1956
