= Dolete puellae =

Roman graffiti found in Pompeii

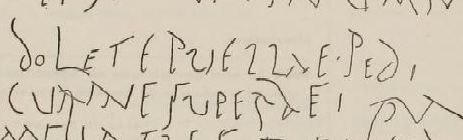
Reproduction of graffiti on paper

Dolete puellae (catalogued ELEGIACI 77/CIL IV 3932) is a Roman graffiti found in the ruins of Pompeii dated before 79 BC. It is a short sentence presumably written in charcoal. The partially fragmentary text has been interpreted as an early declaration—possibly satirical or sarcastic—of a change of sexual orientation or coming out of the closet.

== Interpretation ==
The full text reads as follows:

...dolete puellae, pedi[cat].
Cunne superbe va[le]

Which could be translated as "Weep, girls. Now I sodomize. Goodbye, proud vulva". It has been described as probably done with charcoal and difficult to read. The original phrase was reconstructed by the German art historian August Mau, and it has been argued that instead the first line originally read pedic[are uolo] ('I want to sodomize').

The author of the message appears to renounce sexual relations with women, while proclaiming his inclination for men through references to genitals. The tone has been interpreted as ironic and slightly heroic, emulating the poetic form of a romantic farewell typical of the Roman elegy, but laden with explicit content.

== Context ==
The graffiti was found in the ruins of the ancient Roman city of Pompeii. on the back wall of a tavern, possibly the tavern or brothel of Innulus and Papilio.

Over 11,000 graffiti samples have been uncovered in the excavations of Pompeii. The walls of one brothel (lupanar) has more than 150 translated pieces of graffiti. Roman graffiti was often rude, and erotic art in Pompeii and Herculaneum has both been exhibited and censored as pornography. The walls of the Suburban Baths had pictures of group sex.

This inscription is remarkable in its apparent renunciation of sex with women. While homosexuality in Ancient Rome is well documented, it differed markedly from the contemporary West. Latin lacks words that would precisely translate "homosexual" and "heterosexual". The primary dichotomy of ancient Roman sexuality was active / dominant / masculine and passive / submissive / feminine. Roman men were free to enjoy sex with other males without a perceived loss of masculinity or social status as long as they took the dominant or penetrative role.
