= Tito Boeri =

Italian economist (born 1958)

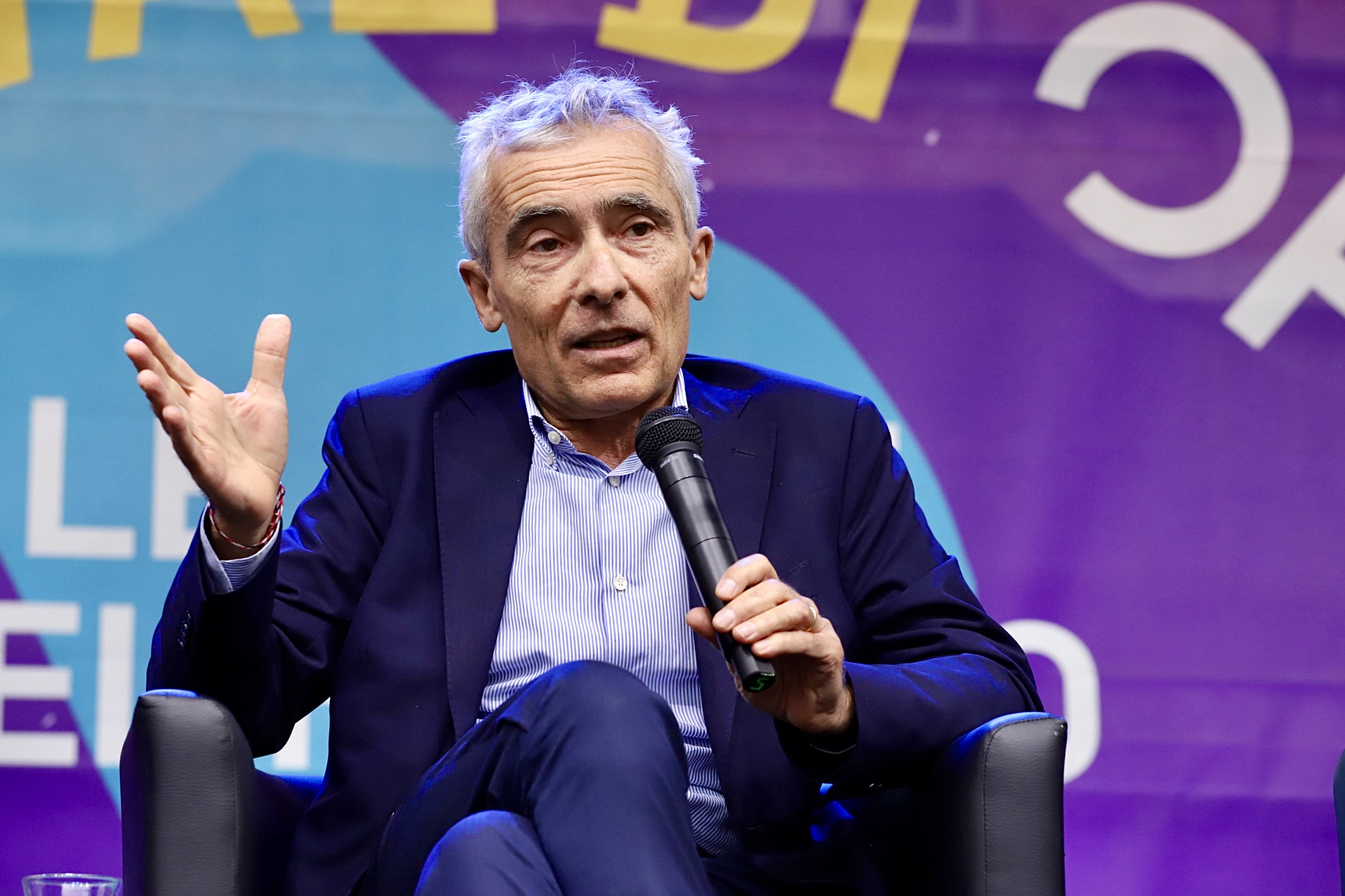
Tito Boeri in 2024

Tito Michele Boeri (born 3 August 1958) is an Italian economist, currently professor of economics at Bocconi University, Milan and acts as Scientific Director of the Fondazione Rodolfo Debenedetti.

== Biography ==
Born in Milan, Boeri obtained his Ph.D. in economics from New York University in 1990. He was senior economist at the Organisation for Economic Co-operation and Development from 1987 to 1996. He was also consultant to the European Commission, International Monetary Fund, the International Labour Organization, the World Bank and the Italian Government. Currently he is a research fellow at the Centre for Economic Policy Research, Institute for the Study of Labor and Igier-Bocconi. His field of research is labour economics, redistributive policies and political economics.

He is the founder of the economic policy watchdog website Lavoce.info and Voxeu.org and the scientific director of the Festival of Economics.

He has published seven books with Oxford University Press and MIT Press, and his papers have been published in the American Economic Review (Papers and Proceedings), Journal of Economic Perspectives, Economic Journal, Economic Policy, European Economic Review, Journal of Labour Economics, and the NBER Macroeconomics Annual. He was elected fellow of the European Economic Association.
