= Carlo Castellaneta =

Italian author and journalist

Carlo Castellaneta (8 February 1930 - 28 September 2013) was an Italian author and journalist.

Born in Milan, Castellaneta began to work at a young age, first in an art gallery and then in the publishing house Arnoldo Mondadori Editore as a proofreader. In 1958 Elio Vittorini, consultant of the publishing house, read the manuscript of Castellaneta's novel Viaggio col padre, and approved the publication; then Castellaneta began a long and prolific career as a novelist, with novels translated into English, French, Spanish and German, but also as a journalist for Il Corriere della Sera and Storia Illustrata of which he was also director. Castellaneta was also chairman of the La Scala Theatre Museum.

His novel Notti e nebbie (Nights and Mists, 1975) was adapted into an eponymous 1984 television miniseries directed by Marco Tullio Giordana.

Castellaneta died on 28 September 2013 in a hospital in Palmanova as a result of complications of pneumonia.
