= Il Regno =

Catholic magazine in Italy

- Categories: Religious magazine
- Frequency: Bimonthly
- Founder: Northern Italian Province of Dehonian Fathers
- Founded: 1956
- Country: Italy
- Based in: Bologna
- Language: Italian language
- Website: Il Regno
- ISSN: 0034-3498

Il Regno (Italian: the Kingdom) is a Catholic magazine published by the Northern Italian Province of Dehonian Fathers in Bologna, Italy. The magazine has been in circulation since 1956.

== History and profile ==
Il Regno was launched in 1956 by the Northern Italian Province of Dehonian Fathers. The magazine is based in Bologna. From 1964 the magazine has published a supplement which covered the Pontifical documents. It has a left-wing political stance and opposed the ban on contraceptives in 1966.

Il Regno was published on a bimonthly basis until 2015 when it folded. Later the magazine was restarted.
