= Paolo Buzzi =

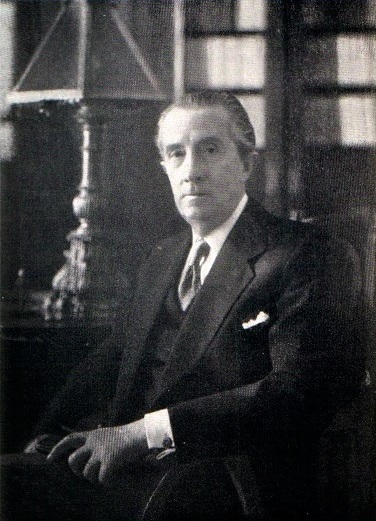

Paolo Buzzi (15 February 1874 in Milan – 18 February 1956) was an Italian futurist playwright and poet.

== Biography ==
Buzzi studied law in Pavia, and at the same time attended lectures in literature. In 1891, he won the milanese Concorso di Poesia award. In 1898 with Rapsodie leopardiane his poetry career began in earnest. In 1905, he won the title of Best Italian Language Poet in a competition in the literary magazine Poesia, founded by Marinetti and Sem Benelli. He started thus to write for Poesia, and became a noted futurist, experimenting with poetical and theatrical form. He also tried filming. In later years, he left the futurist work ethos and worked with traditional forms of poetry.

== Works ==
- Poesie leopardiane 1898, Galli e Raimondi, Milan
- L'esilio, 1906, Galli e Raimondi, Milan
- Aeroplani, 1909, Edizioni di "Poesia", Milan
- Versi liberi Treves, 1913, Milan
- L'Elisse e la spirale, 1915, Edizioni di "Poesia", Milan
- Bel canto, 1916, Studio Editoriale, Lombardo
- Popolo, canta così! 1920, Facchi, Milan
- Poema dei quarantanni, 1922, Edizioni di "Poesia", Milan
- Canti per le chiese vuote, 1930, Foligno Campitelli
- Poema di radioonde, 1940
- Atomiche, 1950
