= 1956 Academy Awards =

1956 Academy Awards may refer to:

- 28th Academy Awards, the 1956 ceremony honoring the best in films for 1955.
- 29th Academy Awards, the 1957 ceremony honoring the best in films for 1956.
