= Lauren Terrazzano =

American journalist

Lauren Elizabeth Terrazzano (March 28, 1968 - May 15, 2007) was an American journalist best known for her "Life, With Cancer" Newsday column and other writings about her illness with cancer.

== Biography ==
She was born on March 28, 1968.

Terrazzano graduated from high school in Tewksbury, Massachusetts. In 1990, Terrazzano earned a bachelor's degree from Boston University. After graduating from the Columbia Graduate School of Journalism in 1994, Terrazzano worked at The New York Daily News and The Record before joining Newsday in 1996. She was part of a team of reporters who won the Pulitzer Prize for coverage of the TWA Flight 800 crash in 1996.

She was diagnosed with lung cancer in August 2004, although she was not a smoker. She died of lung cancer at Memorial Sloan Kettering Cancer Center in Manhattan on May 15, 2007.
