= Corpse for Sale =

Play by Dario Fo

Corpse for Sale (Italian: Un morto da vendere) is a one-act play by Dario Fo.

== Plot summary ==
A pair of card sharps shoot a simpleton after they are beaten by him in a card game.

== Translations ==
Ed Emery has carried out an authorized English translation.
