= Silvia Ronchey =

Silvia Ronchey is an Italian writer and Byzantine historian. She is Professor of Byzantine Civilisation in the Department of Humanistic Studies at the Università degli Studi Roma Tre. She has written for the newspaper La Repubblica.

== Bibliography ==
- Hypatia. The True Story (Berlin: De Gruyter, 2021)
- Silvia Ronchey and Paolo Cesaretti (eds), Eustathii Thessalonicensis. Exegesis in Canonem Iambicum Pentecostalem, (Supplementa Byzantina, 10), 2014
