= Suburban Baths (Pompeii) =

Buildings in Pompeii, Italy

Coordinates: 40°44′55″N 14°28′58″E

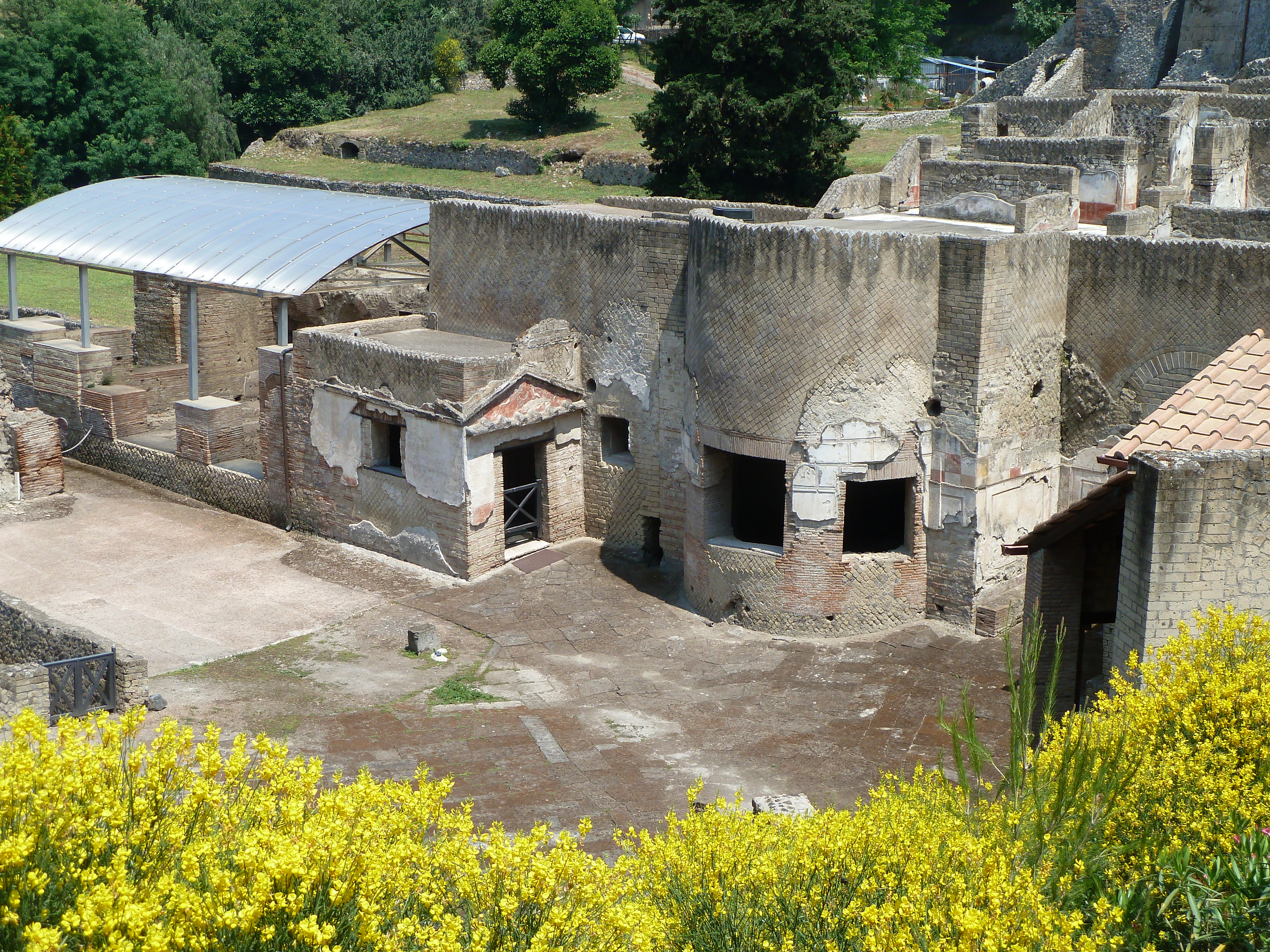
Suburban baths near the Porta Marina

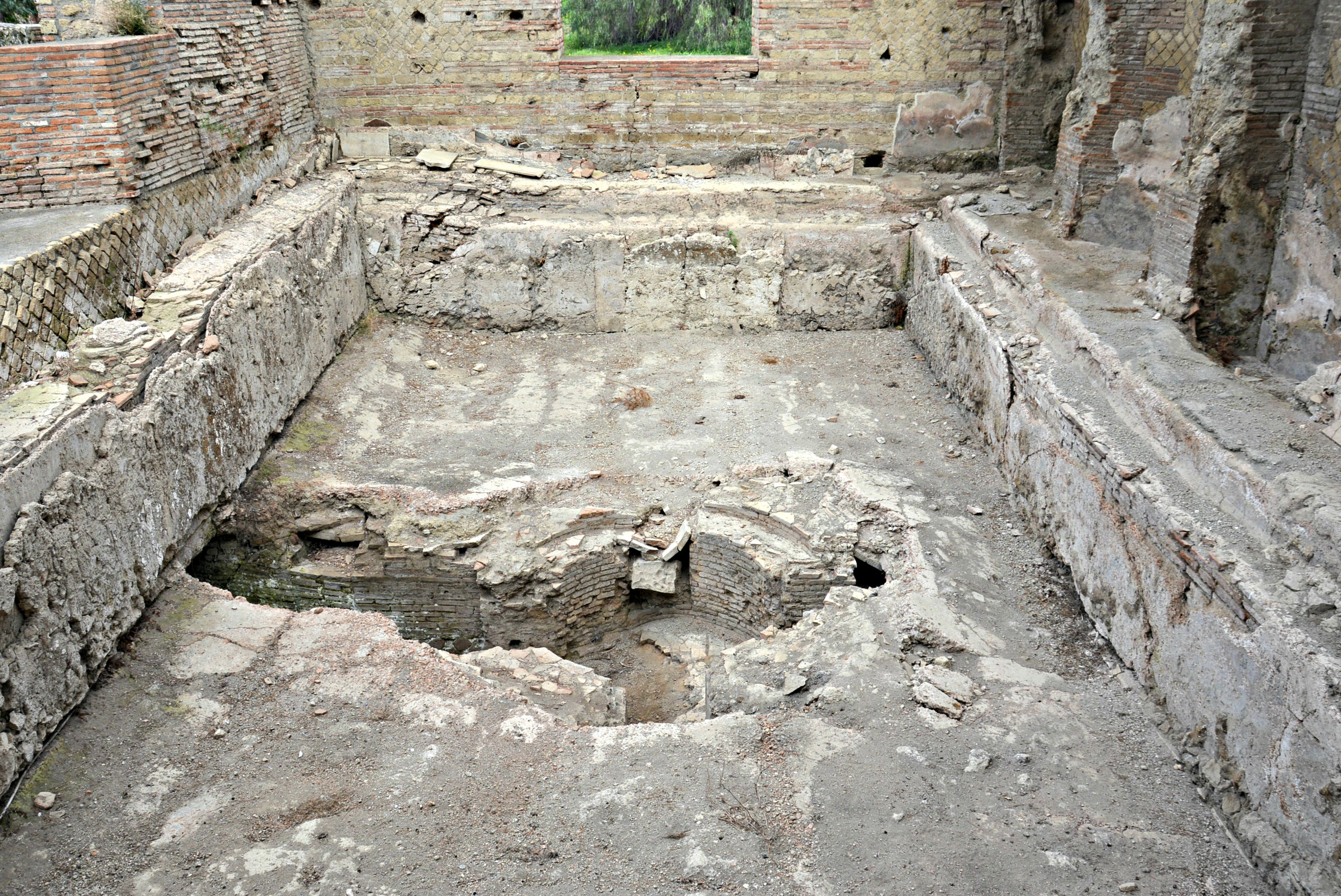
Heated pool next to caldarium

The Suburban Baths (Italian: Terme Suburbane) are a building in Pompeii, Italy, a town in the Italian region of Campania that was buried by the eruption of Mount Vesuvius in 79 AD, which consequently preserved it.

The Suburban Baths were publicly owned, as were also the Stabian, Forum, and Central baths in the city. They were built in the early empire, possibly under the Emperor Tiberius (14–37 AD), much later than the others and thus were built outside the city walls near the Porta Marina, one of the city gates. By this time, land was more easily available outside the city as the walls had lost their defensive role after the town became a Roman colony.

The baths also benefitted from the increased supply of running water after the connection of the city to the Aqua Augusta aqueduct in 30–20 BC.

The bathhouse was renovated after the earthquake of 62 AD, when a piscina calida, a heated swimming pool, was added to the north of the complex.

The baths were discovered in 1958, much later than the rest of the city, though a systematic excavation had to wait until 1985–1987.

Although publicly owned, these baths seem to have been reserved for a private clientele unlike the other public baths.

The building is notable for its surviving erotic wall paintings, the only set of such art found in a public Roman bath house.

== Structure ==
The building was a two-story structure: the upper floor, as in the Palaestra/Sarno baths, was divided into three apartments for rent, with views towards the port and the Bay of Naples through the large glass windows. These rooms may also have provided space for the selling of sexual services. This upper floor was either accessed by a staircase from the floor below or via a door on the Via Marina.

The baths were built to a higher standard of luxury and thermal effectiveness than the earlier baths in the town and have many hallmarks of the "newer" bath architecture of the 1st century AD: "single-axis row" type (with rooms in a linear increasingly warm arrangement promoting a particular route through the baths and bordering a palaestra), large windows facing southwest, and an outdoor pool with a fountain.

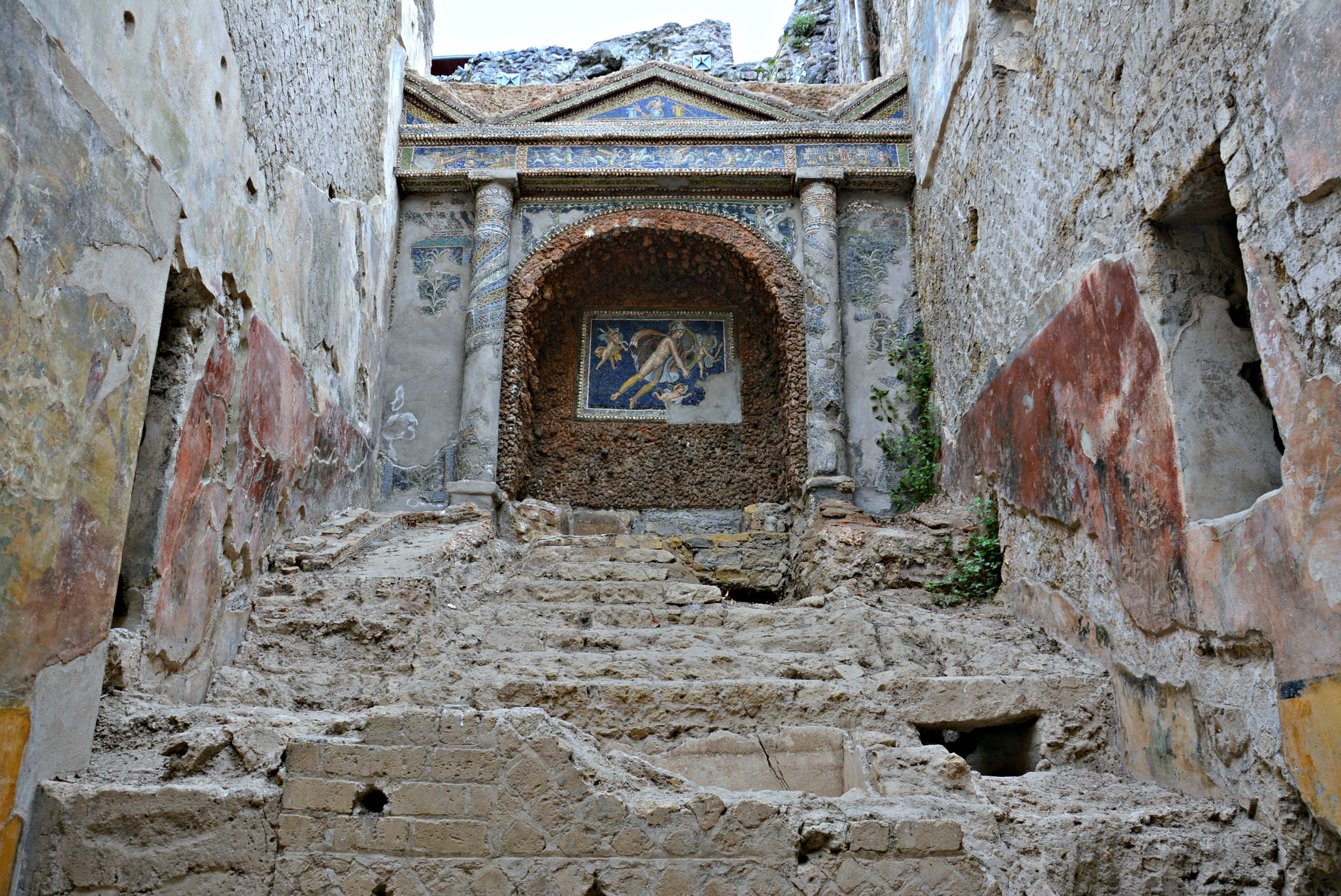
Nymphaeum with waterfall cascades in frigidarium

Construction was first limited to the apodyterium (dressing room), frigidarium (cold room), tepidarium (warm room), laconicum (hot dry room) and caldarium (hot room); the natatio was added later as three rooms, including a nymphaeum with a water cascade, providing an alternative route to the existing one of the tepidarium followed by the caldarium. The entrance to the bathhouse is through a long corridor that leads into the apodyterium. The bathers would also have had access to a latrine, seating between six and eight people.

The piscina calida (hot pool) used an innovative heating system called a samovar, a domed metal plate which was part of the pool floor above the furnace to heat the pool water directly.

Only one apodyterium or dressing room has led to speculation by archaeologists that both men and women shared these baths, or that it was male-only or time-shared with females bathing at one time and males bathing at a different time. If it had been time shared the dressing room that contains the erotic wall paintings would have been used by everyone when they attended.

== Erotic art in the Suburban Baths ==
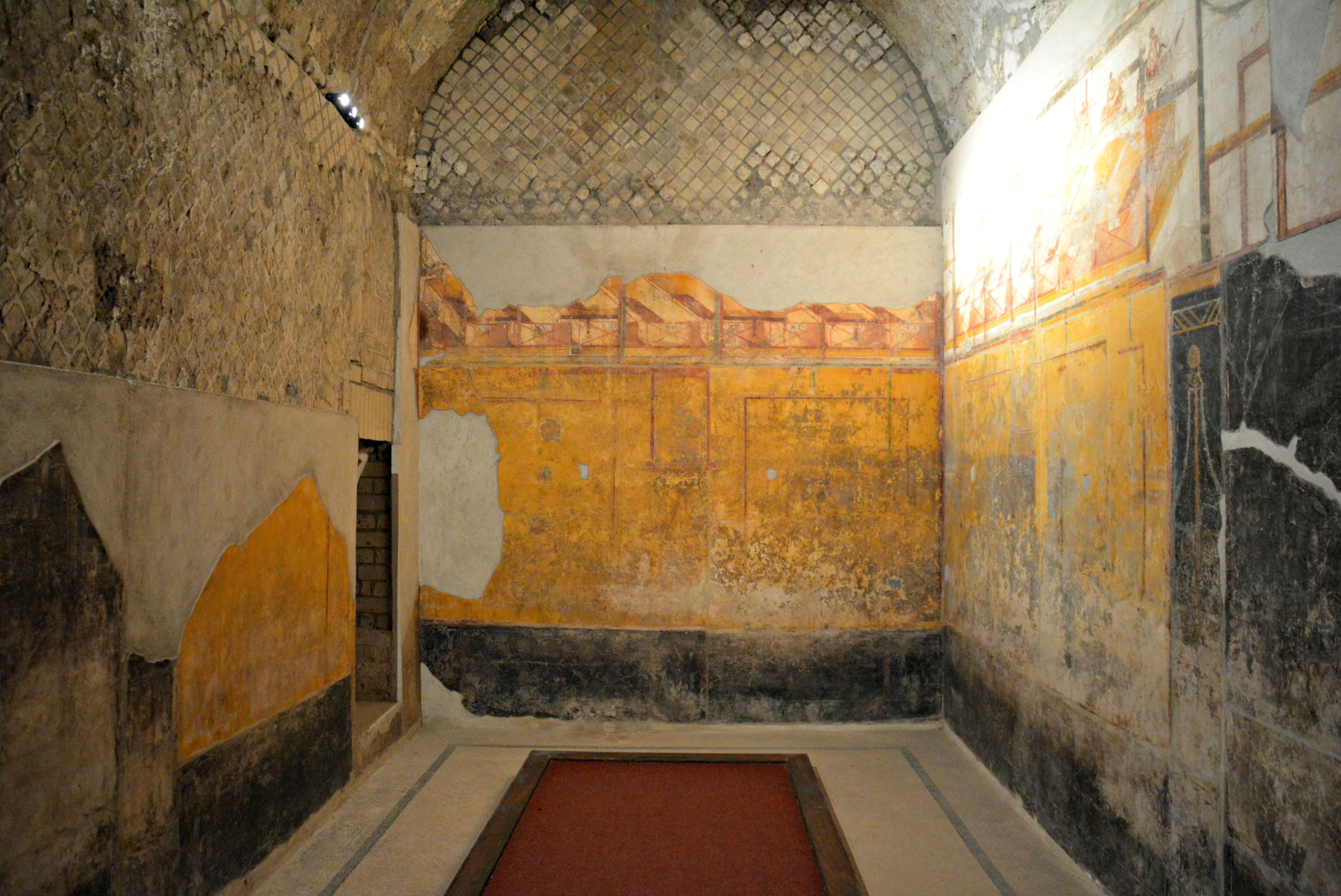
The dressing room in the suburban baths. It is thought that a wooden shelf may have extended along two of these walls and that on this shelf were placed boxes were bathers could place their clothes.

A room that is thought to be a dressing room in the suburban baths has on a wall inside it seven wall paintings of sexual scenes and one wall painting of a figure with an enlarged scrotum. These wall paintings were found in 1986 when the room was first excavated. The paintings are dated to 62 to 79 AD.

The erotic wall paintings in the Suburban Baths are the only set of such art found in a public Roman bath house. Explicit sex scenes of group sex and oral sex are depicted in these paintings and these scenes cannot be easily found in collections of erotic Roman art. As the sexual acts portrayed are all considered "debased" according to the customs of ancient Rome, it is possible that the intention behind their reproduction was to provide a source of humor to visitors of the building.

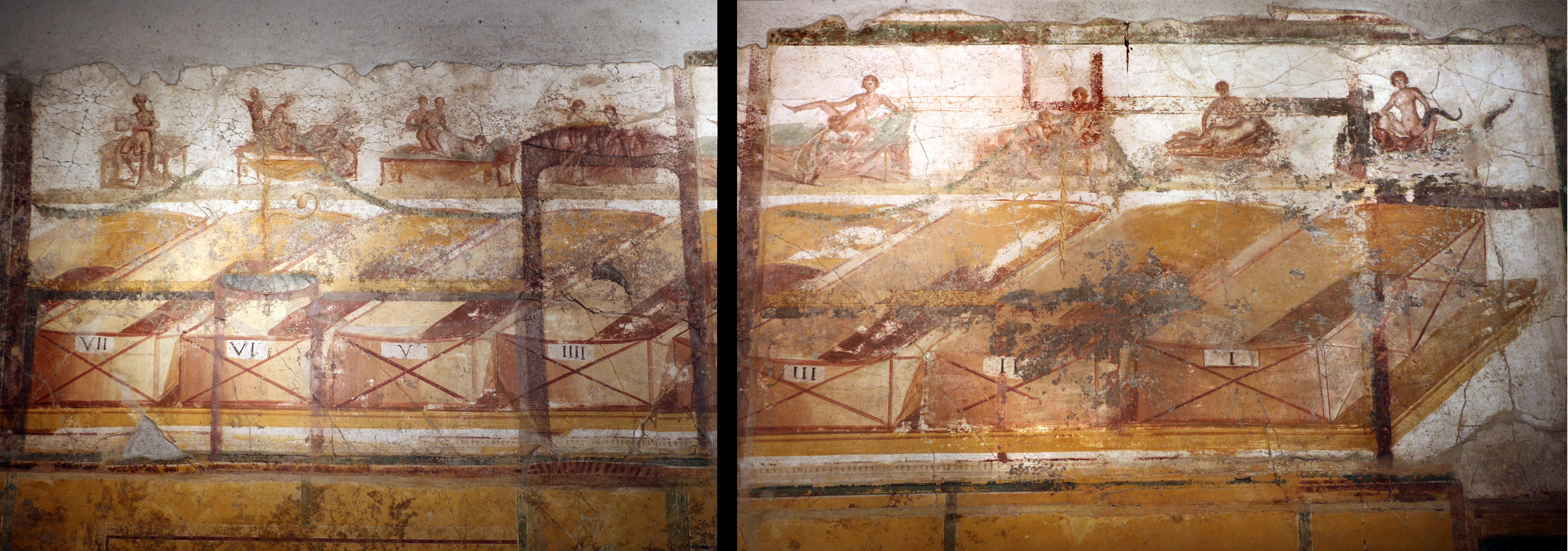
A wall in the dressing room in the suburban baths. On this wall there are seven paintings of sexual scenes located above paintings of numbered boxes on a shelf. An eighth painting is of a nude male. 62 to 79 CE

Each wall painting of a sexual scene has a painting just below it of a box with a number on it. It is thought that there were actual boxes that were placed under these paintings of boxes.` These boxes would have been placed on a wooden shelf. This wooden shelf would have run along two walls of this dressing room just underneath where the paintings of numbered boxes are.` There are some holes in the rear and right wall where brackets that held the selves could have been.` It is thought that these boxes that were sitting on this wooden shelf under these paintings would have been where people attending the baths would have put their clothes after they had undressed in this room. The only remains of the boxes themselves are metal straps. In the wall paintings of the boxes you can see an "X" shape at the front of the boxes that indicates where the straps were. The wall painting also shows the wooden shelf underneath the boxes.

One idea that has been speculated is that spintria tokens were used as locker tokens in this dressing room. These tokens have on one side an image of a sexual scene and on the reverse side a numeral between I - XVI.

It is speculated that the sexual scenes and numerals on the tokens related to the wall paintings of sexual scenes and numerals. When the token was given to a person it then gave them access to a place to put their clothing. Possibly they may have put their clothing inside the box that was sitting on the wooden shelf in the dressing room.

It is also speculated that the paintings possibly served as way for the bathers to remember the location of their box (in lieu of numbering).

The presence of these paintings in a public bathhouse shared by men and women gives some insight into Roman culture and suggests that people would not have found this offensive, and possibly humorous.

It has been commented that "Graffiti from Pompeii, Herculaneum and 2nd century Ostia Antica, often refer to group sex, although none describe the pose of scene VI [from inside the dressing room of the suburban baths that shows sex between a female and two males].".

Wall paintings from the dressing room in the Suburban Baths

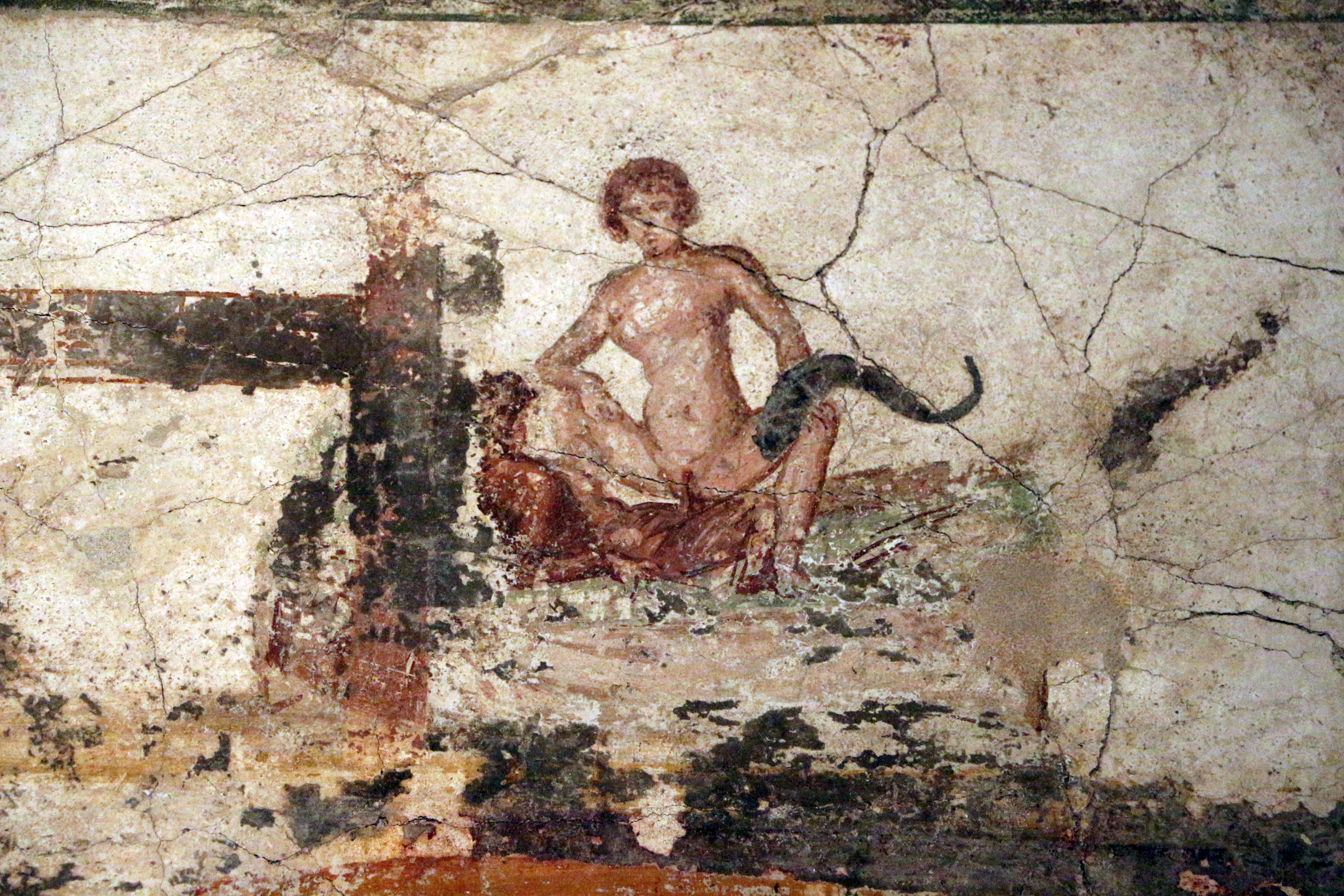
Fresco showing a cowgirl position. A ferret is on the knee of one of the figures. Suburban Baths, Pompeii. 62 to 79 AD

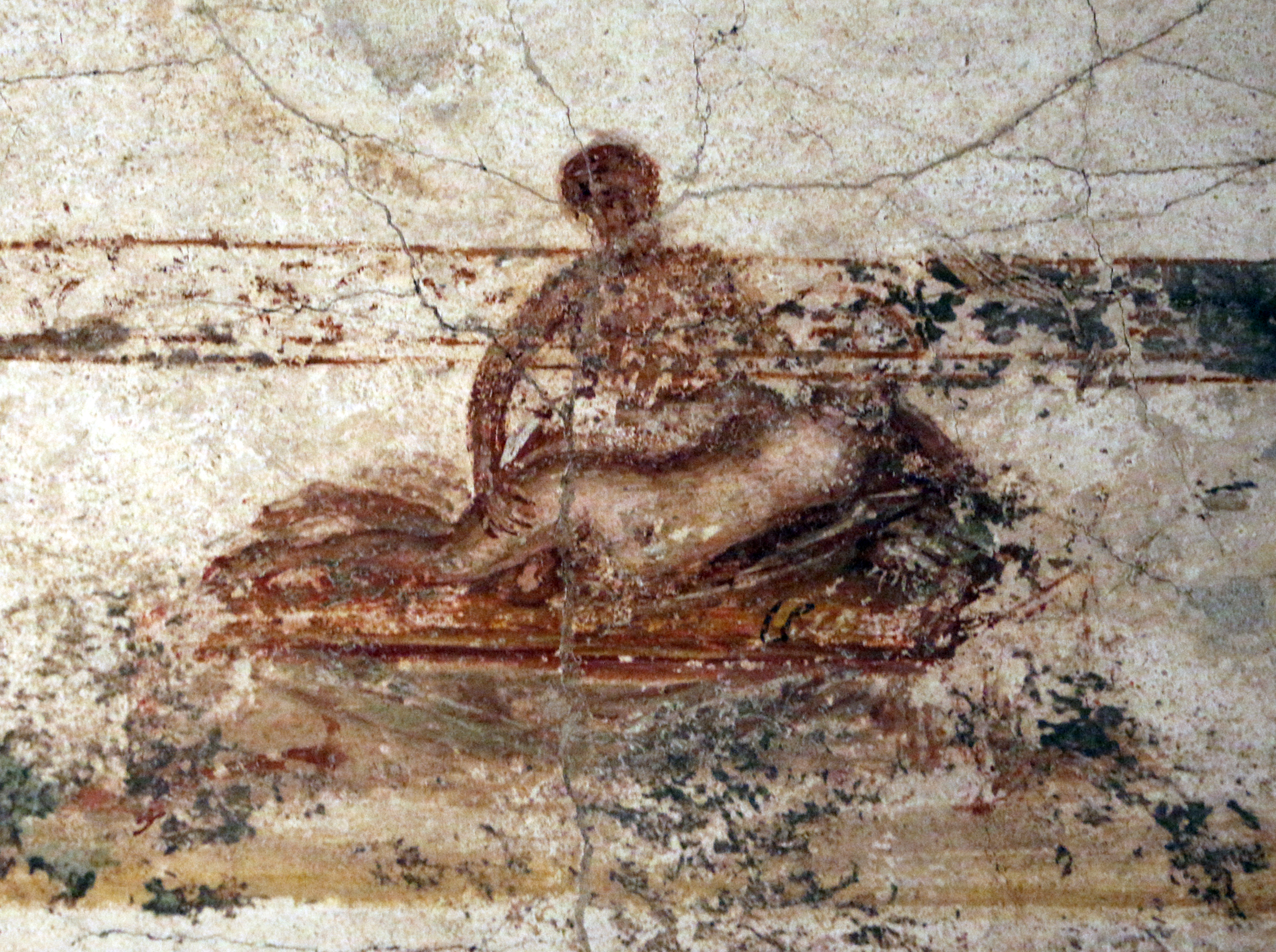
An erotic scene on a bed. Wall painting. Suburban Baths, Pompeii. 62 to 79 AD

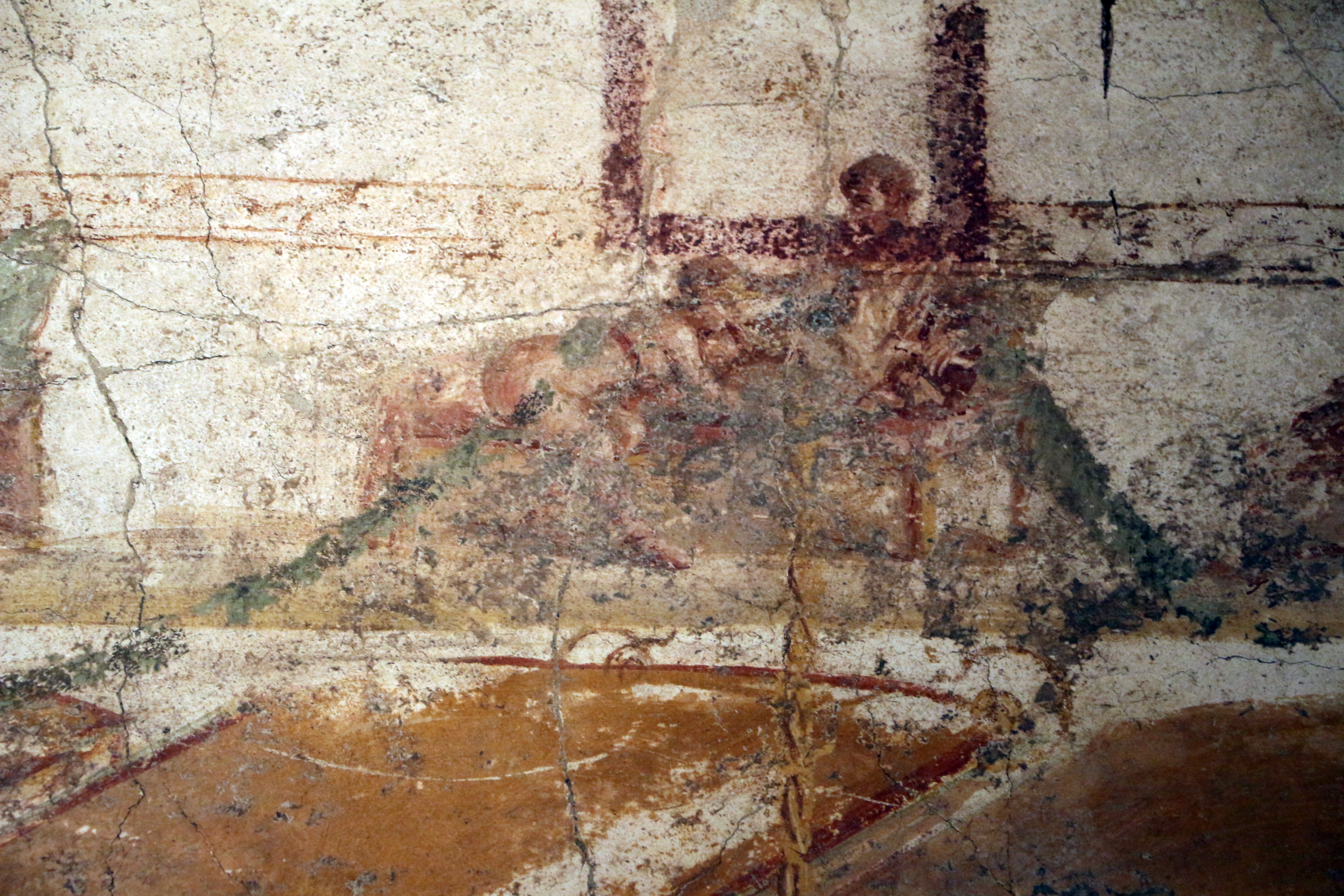
Fellatio. Wall painting. Suburban Baths, Pompeii. 62 to 79 AD

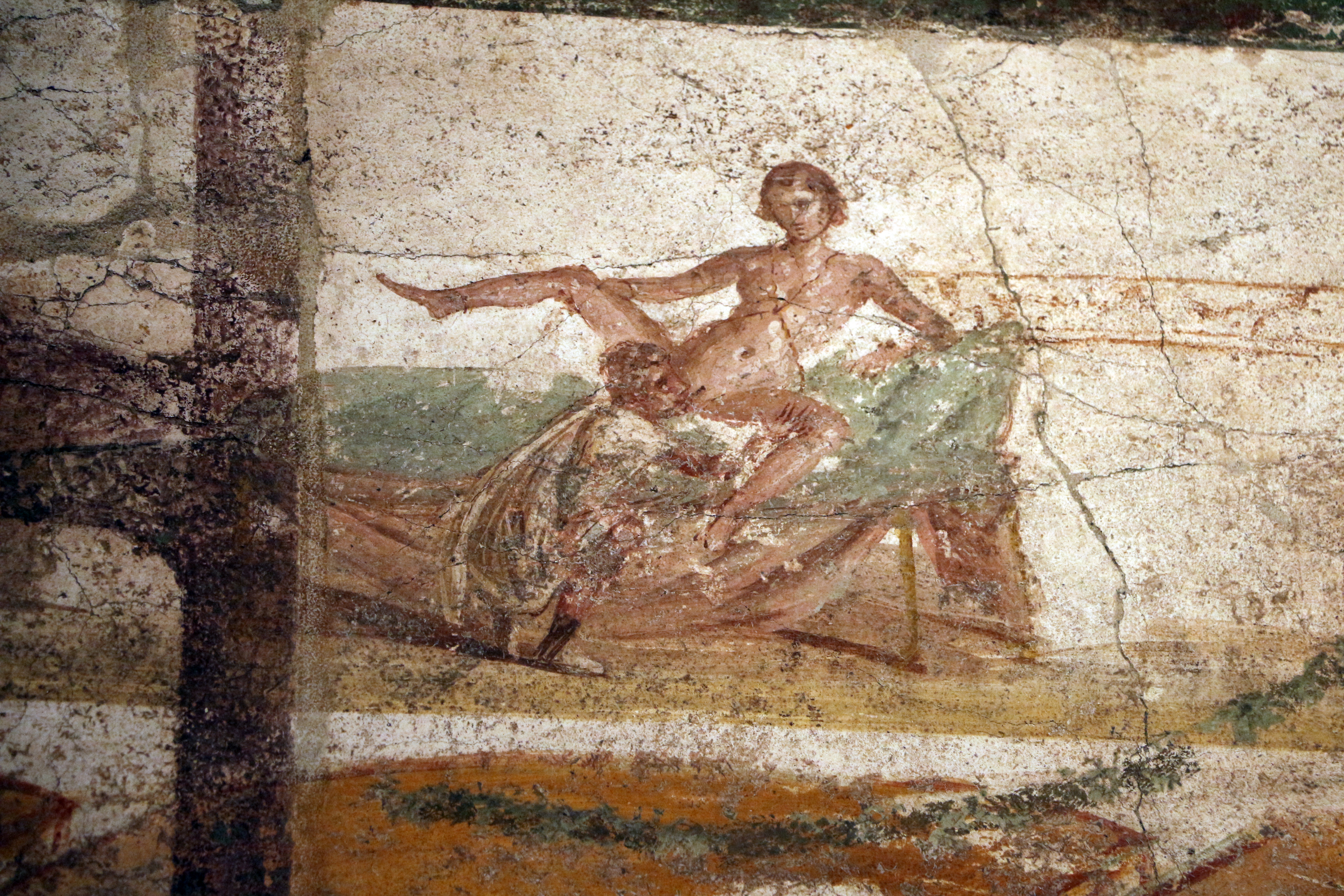
Fresco depicting cunnilingus. Suburban Baths, Pompeii. 62 to 79 AD

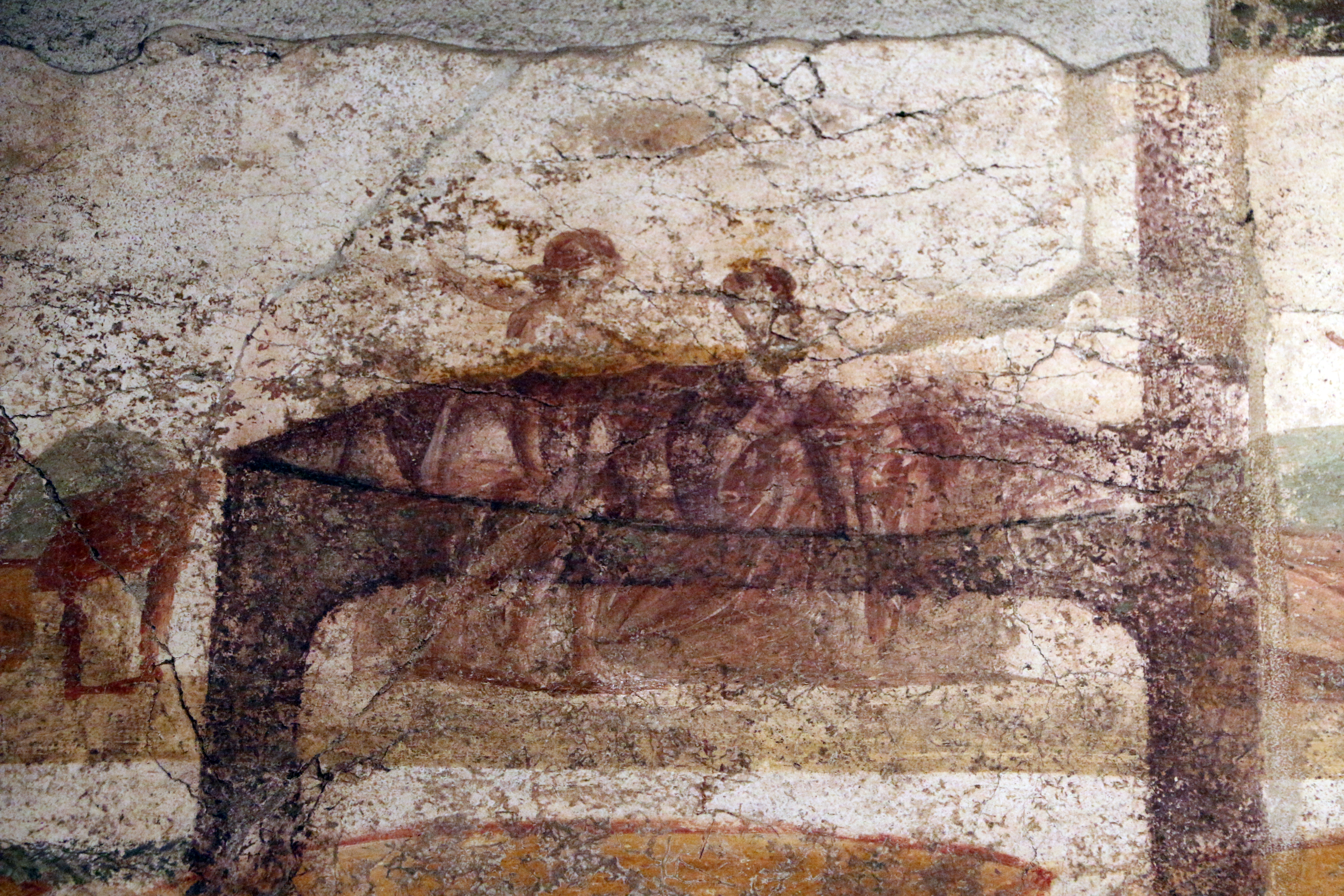
Lesbian sex scene. The patches of dark green color are remains of the repainting of the wall. Suburban Baths, Pompeii. 62 to 79 AD

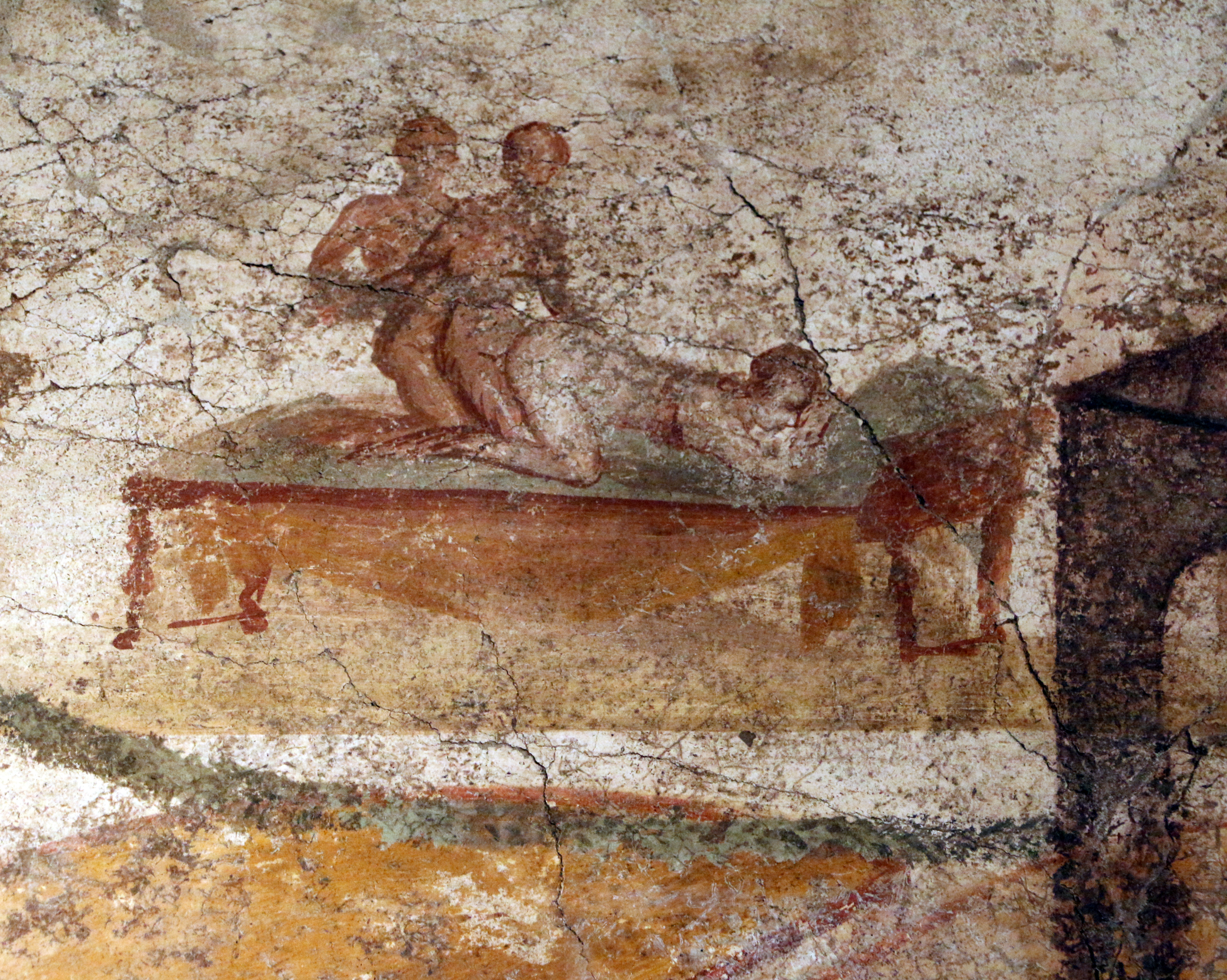
Sex between a female and two males. Wall painting. Suburban Baths, Pompeii. 62 to 79 AD

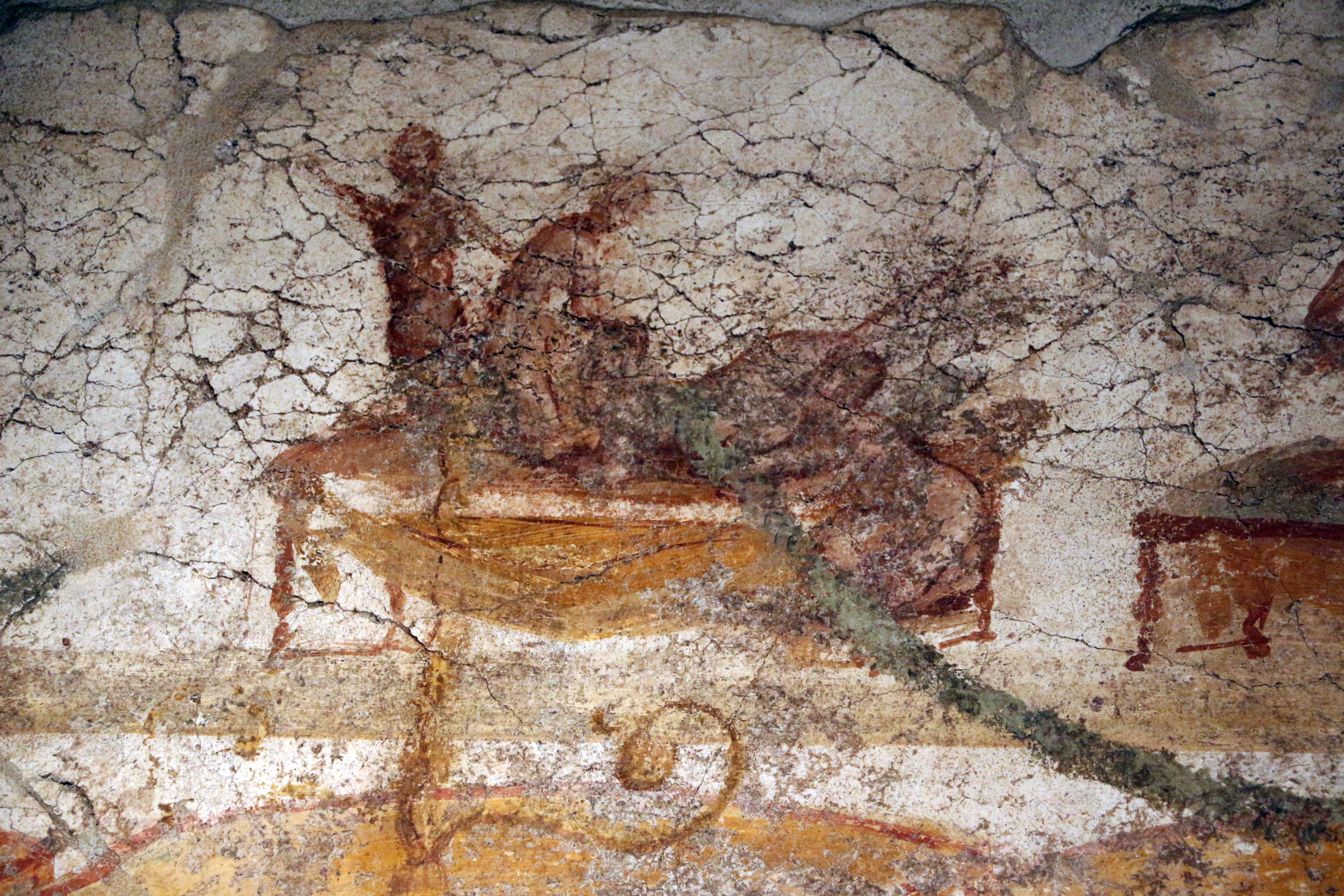
Cunnilingus, fellatio and anal sex between two females and two males. Wall painting, Suburban Baths. Pompeii. 62 to 79 AD

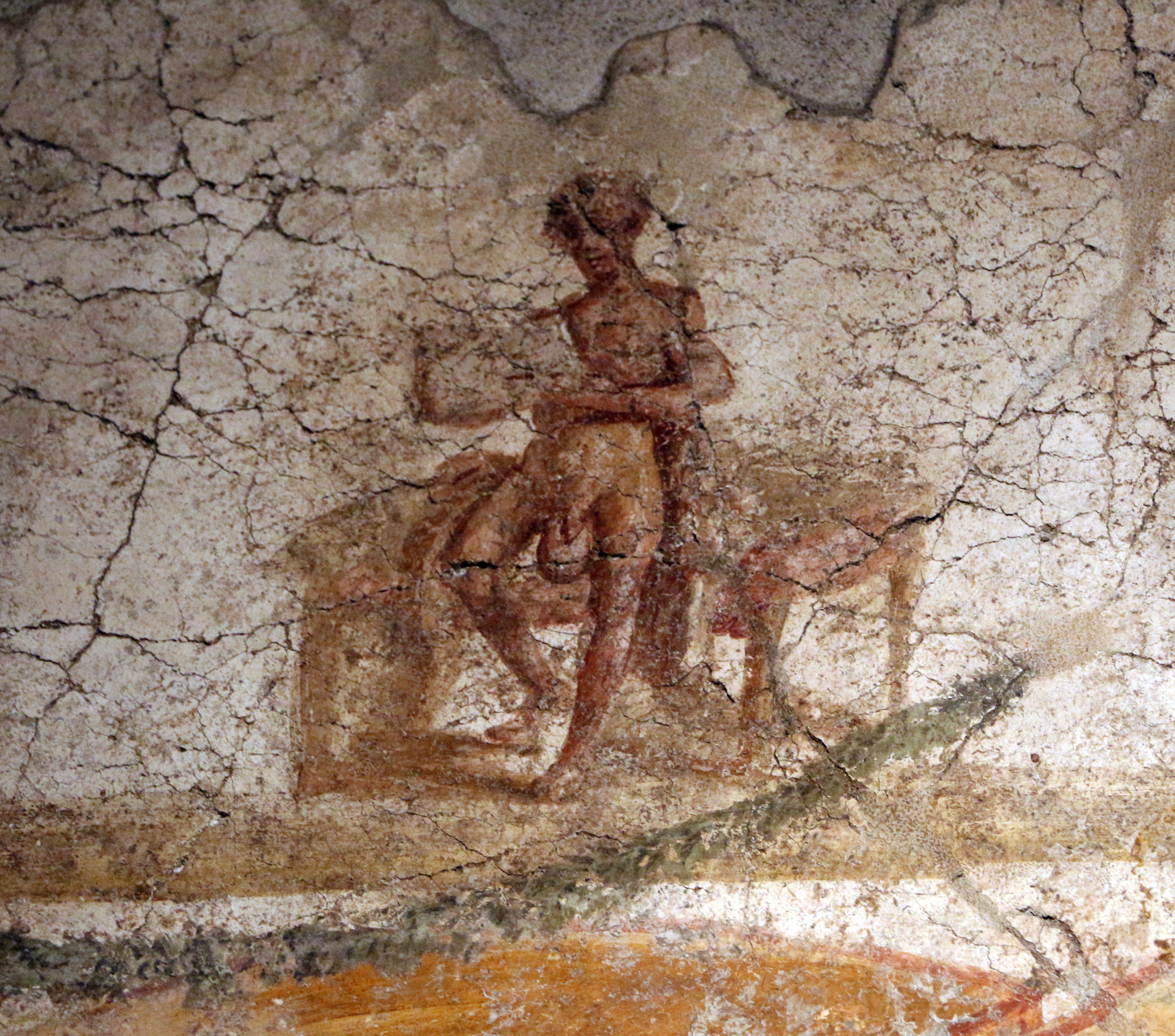
A nude male with an enlarged scrotum holding a scroll. Wall painting. Suburban Baths, Pompeii. 62 to 79 AD

== See also ==
- Erotic art in Pompeii and Herculaneum
- Homosexuality in ancient Rome
- Sexuality in ancient Rome
