= Dynamism of a Human Body: Boxer =

1913 drawing by Umberto Boccioni

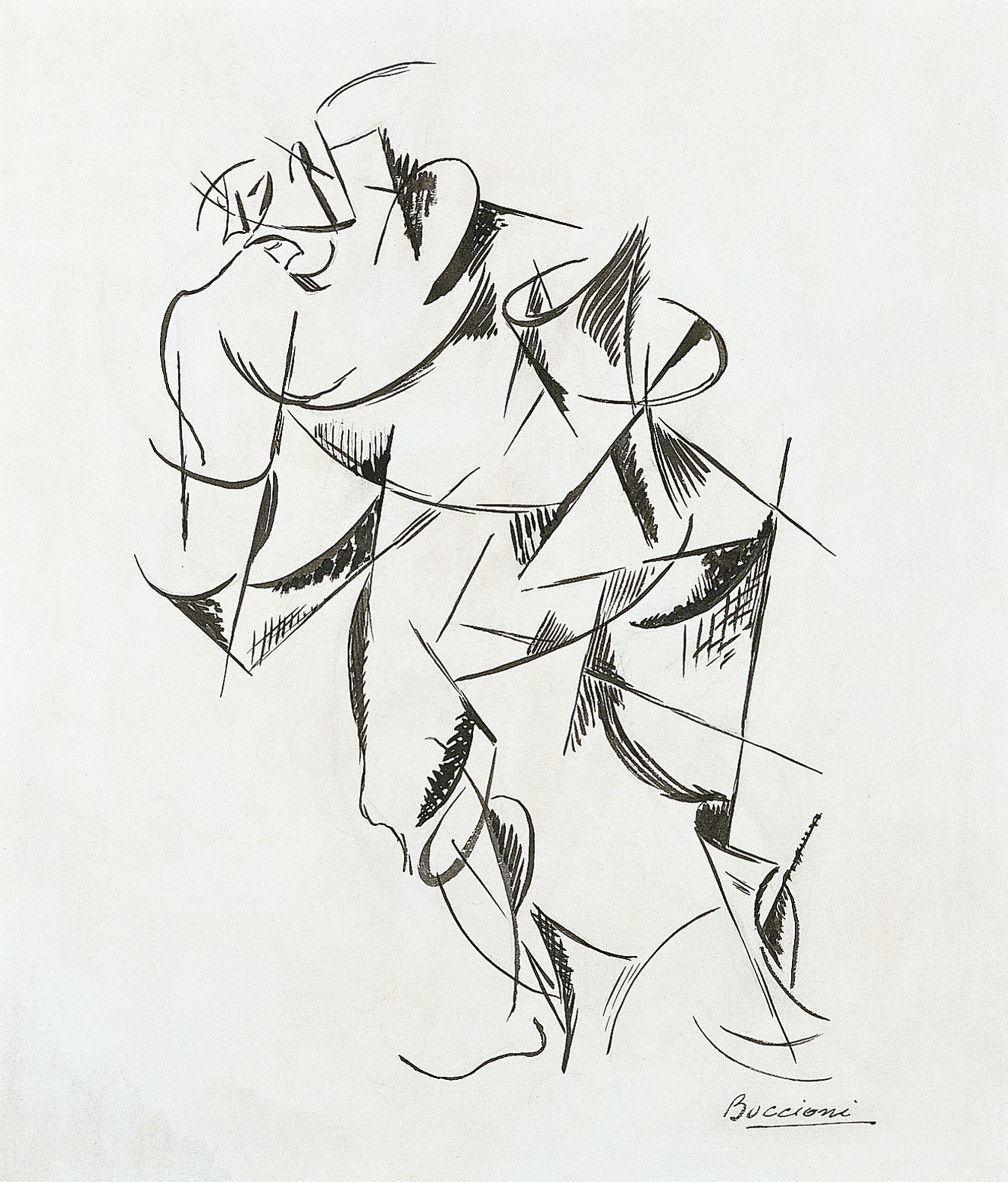
- Artist: Umberto Boccioni
- Year: 1913
- Type: Ink on paper
- Dimensions: 29 cm × 25 cm (11 in × 9.8 in)
- Location: Thyssen-Bornemisza Museum; Madrid

Dynamism of a Human Body: Boxer is a 1913 dynamism drawing created by the futurist Italian artist Umberto Boccioni. The work was intended to show a subject in between a state of motion and stillness.

== Background ==
Painter Umberto Boccioni, one of the earliest members of the school of futurism, had in 1912 found an interest in sculpture. During the early stages of his pursuit, Boccioni found himself working on the dynamism of forms. Boccioni wanted to find a single form which would capture all movement, as opposed to having a series of images. Viewing the past as a constraining force, Boccioni wanted to separate Italian art from the old methods and techniques. Boccioni had declared that "plastic dynamism is the simultaneous action of the motion characteristic of the object, mixed with the transformation which the object undergoes in relation to its mobile and immobile environment". Ultimately, Boccioni sought a form that was caught between spatial and temporal components.

== Subject and themes ==
The work was part of a forty-six drawing series executed at a time when Boccioni was exploring dynamism in his paintings. According to Ester Coen, Boccioni's primary aim in these paintings was the "exploration of spatial solutions". A painting such as Dynamism of a Human Body (1913) departs from Boccioni's more usual style into three dimensions. Boccioni wrote that the painting is meant not to be viewed in any type of motion or fixed presence, but rather in such a way that it would "decompose according to the tendencies of its forces". Despite the abstractness of the painting, the viewer can make out movement by view of the contours and bundles of muscles. In general, the series of Boccioni's dynamisms attempt to document progressive movement through its various elements.

== Exhibition ==
The series of forty-six "Dynamism" drawings was displayed in the spring of 1914 at Florence.
