= Three Women =

Three Women may refer to:

== Film ==
- Three Women (1924 film), an American film directed by Ernst Lubitsch
- Three Women (1936 film) or Girl Friends, a Soviet film directed by Lev Arnshtam
- Three Women (1949 film) or Women Side by Side, a Chinese film directed by Chen Liting
- Three Women (1952 film), a French film directed by André Michel
- Three Women (1956 film), Polish film based on a short story by Kornel Filipowicz
- Three Women (1968 film), an Egyptian film written by Ihsan Abdel Quddous
- 3 Women, a 1977 American film directed by Robert Altman
- Three Women (2008 film), an Iranian drama film

== Paintings ==
- Three Women (Boccioni), a 1909–10 painting by Umberto Boccioni
- Three Women, a 1908 painting by Pablo Picasso
- Three Women, a 1921–22 painting by Fernand Léger, a work in the Museum of Modern Art

== Other uses ==
- Three Women (book), a 2019 book by Lisa Taddeo
  - Three Women (TV series), a 2024 series based on the book
- Three Women, an album by Sara Hickman, Patty Mitchell Lege and Robin Macy
