= Riot in the Gallery =

Painting by Umberto Boccioni

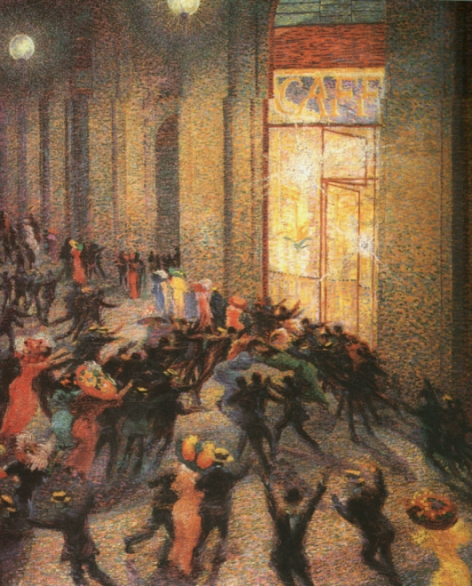
Riot in the Gallery (1910) by Umberto Boccioni

Riot in the Gallery is an oil-on-canvas painting by the Italian painter Umberto Boccioni, one of the main figures of the futurist movement. The painting was created in 1910 and was first called A Brawl (Italian: Una baruffa). Its dimensions are 74 × 64 cm and it is now in the Pinacoteca di Brera in Milan.

According to Vivien Greene (2014), "Riot in the Galleria depicts frenzied spectators around a shocking fight between two women—thought to be prostitutes—in Milan’s famous indoor mall, the Galleria Vittorio Emanuele II." The crowd represents the bourgeoisie of that time, and they seem chaotic and maybe even drunk. For Christine Poggi (2002) the movement of the two women generates, for the one hand, an entrapment of those who are near them, and for the other, a stampede that's trying to reach the center to watch the fight.

The futurist movement tends to focus on the modernization of the cities, and this is visible in this painting due to features like electric streetlights and glass shopping centers. The location of the fight is a shopping mall, a site that represents consumption and entertainment. Even though Boccioni's artwork follows the futurist style, according to Charles Saatchi (2017), a subtle influence of pointillism can be seen in this painting.
