= The City Rises =

Painting by Umberto Boccioni

- La città che sale (Italian)
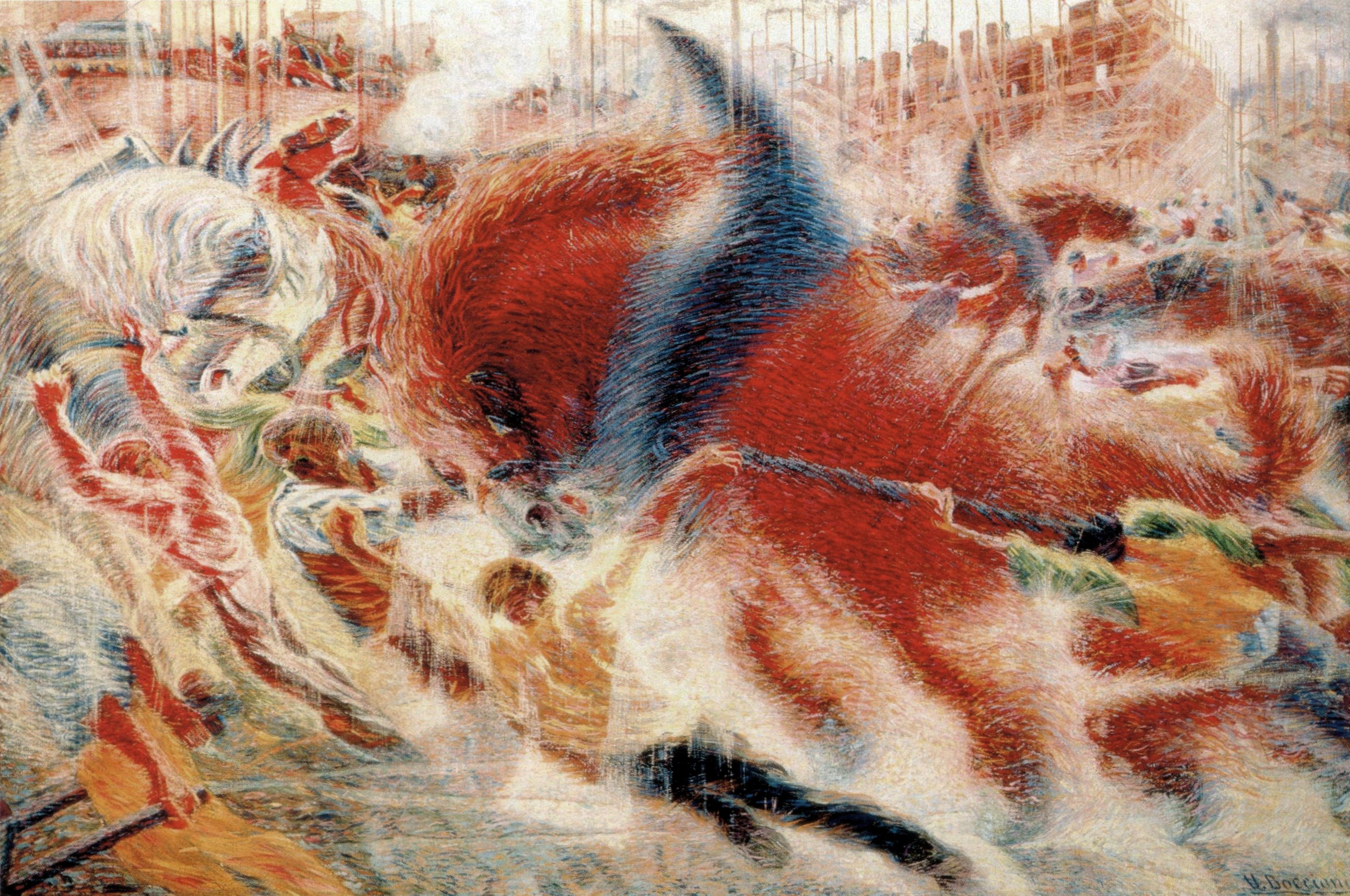
- Artist: Umberto Boccioni
- Year: 1910
- Catalogue: 79865
- Medium: Oil on Canvas
- Dimensions: 199 cm × 301 cm (78 in × 119 in)
- Location: Museum of Modern Art (MoMA), New York
- Accession: 507.1951

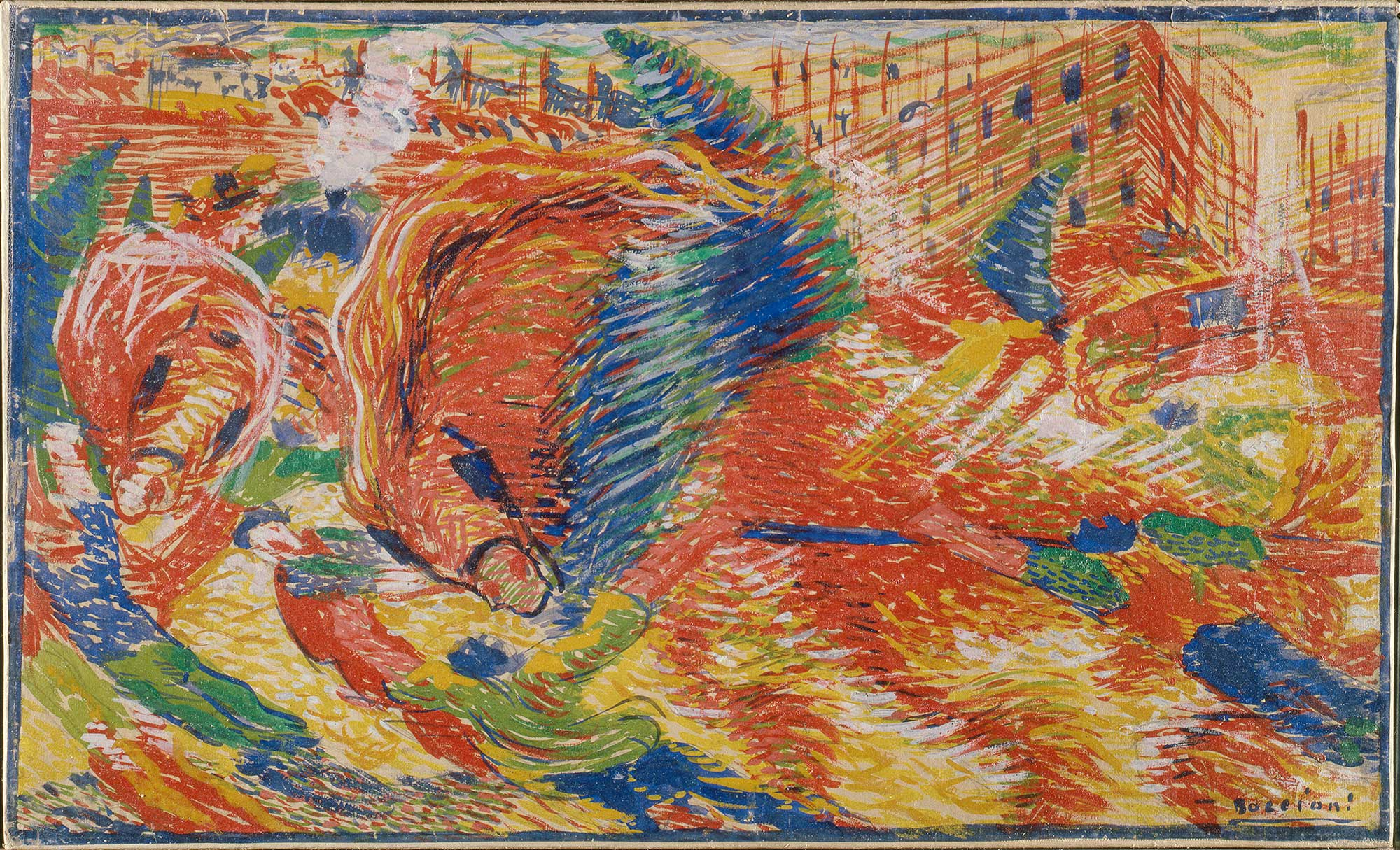
Sketch for The City Rises

The City Rises (La città che sale) (1910) is an oil painting by the Italian painter, Umberto Boccioni. It was his first major Futurist work.

== Background ==
The original title of the painting was Il lavoro (The Work), as it appeared at the Mostra d'arte libera (Exhibition of free art) in Milan in 1911. Though realistic elements are present, such as the building, and the space is still rendered through perspective, this painting is considered the first true futurist work by Umberto Boccioni, even though it is not markedly different from his several previous works centered on suburbs. In this painting the naturalistic vision of the previous works is partly abandoned, replaced by a more dynamic vision.

== Subject ==
The painting portrays the construction of a new city with developments and technology. Buildings in construction in a suburb can be seen with chimneys in the upper part, but most of the space is occupied by men and horses, merged in a dynamic effort. Boccioni thus emphasizes some of the most typical elements of futurism, the exaltation of human work and the importance of the modern town built around modern necessities. Suburbs, and the urban environment in general, formed the basis of many of Boccioni's paintings, from the capture of the staccato sounds of construction in The Street-Pavers to the riot of sound and colour offered to the observer of street scenes, as typified by his 1912 painting The Street Enters the House.

The painting features prominently a horse, domesticated but straining against its tethers. This beast of burden overcoming its handlers represents the modern city and exemplifies the violence, energy, and speed of progress.

== Provenance ==
In 1912, the picture was bought by the musician Ferruccio Busoni during the travelling futurist art exposition in Europe. It has been exhibited in the Museum of Modern Art in New York City as part of their permanent collection.
