= States of Mind I:The Farewells =

Painting by Umberto Boccioni

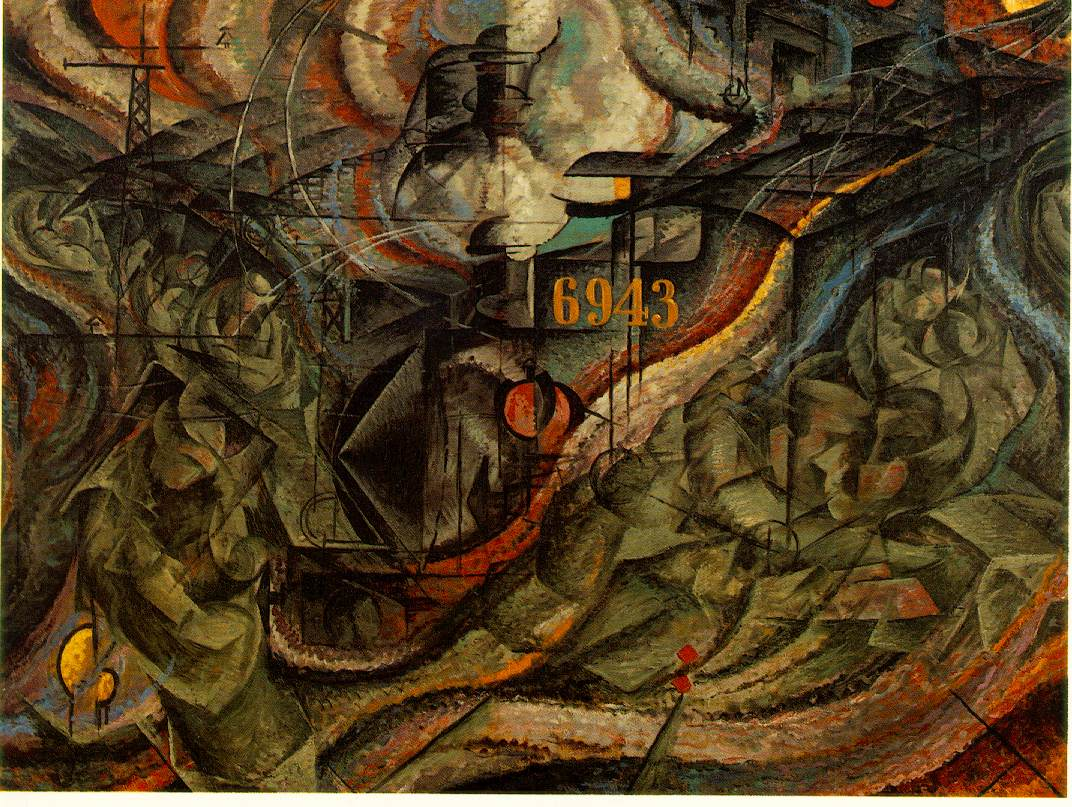
- Artist: Umberto Boccioni
- Year: 1911
- Medium: oil on canvas
- Dimensions: 70.5 cm × 96.2 cm (27.8 in × 37.9 in)
- Location: Museum of Modern Art, New York City

States of Mind I:The Farewells is the first in a series of three oil paintings by the Italian Futurist painter Umberto Boccioni which are all in the collection of the Museum of Modern Art (MOMA) in New York City. Executed in 1911 and set in a railway station, the three works ("The Farewells", "Those Who Go" and "Those Who Stay") attempt to depict the psychological aspects of the drama and emotion of modern travel.

In The Farewells the would be travellers and those seeing them off, the steam and smoke of the railway engines and even the station environment itself are all swirling together in a tumultuous vortex of waves around the only element of calm, the railway engine's number. The other two paintings in the series separately explore the feelings of the travellers and of those left behind on the platform.

All three paintings were originally acquired from the artist by the founder of the Futurist movement, Filippo Tommaso Marinetti and sold by his widow to Nelson A. Rockefeller, who donated them to MOMA in 1979.

== See also ==
- 100 Great Paintings, 1980 BBC series
