= Dynamism of a Speeding Horse + Houses =

Sculpture by Umberto Boccioni

- Dinamismo di un cavallo in corsa + case (Italian)
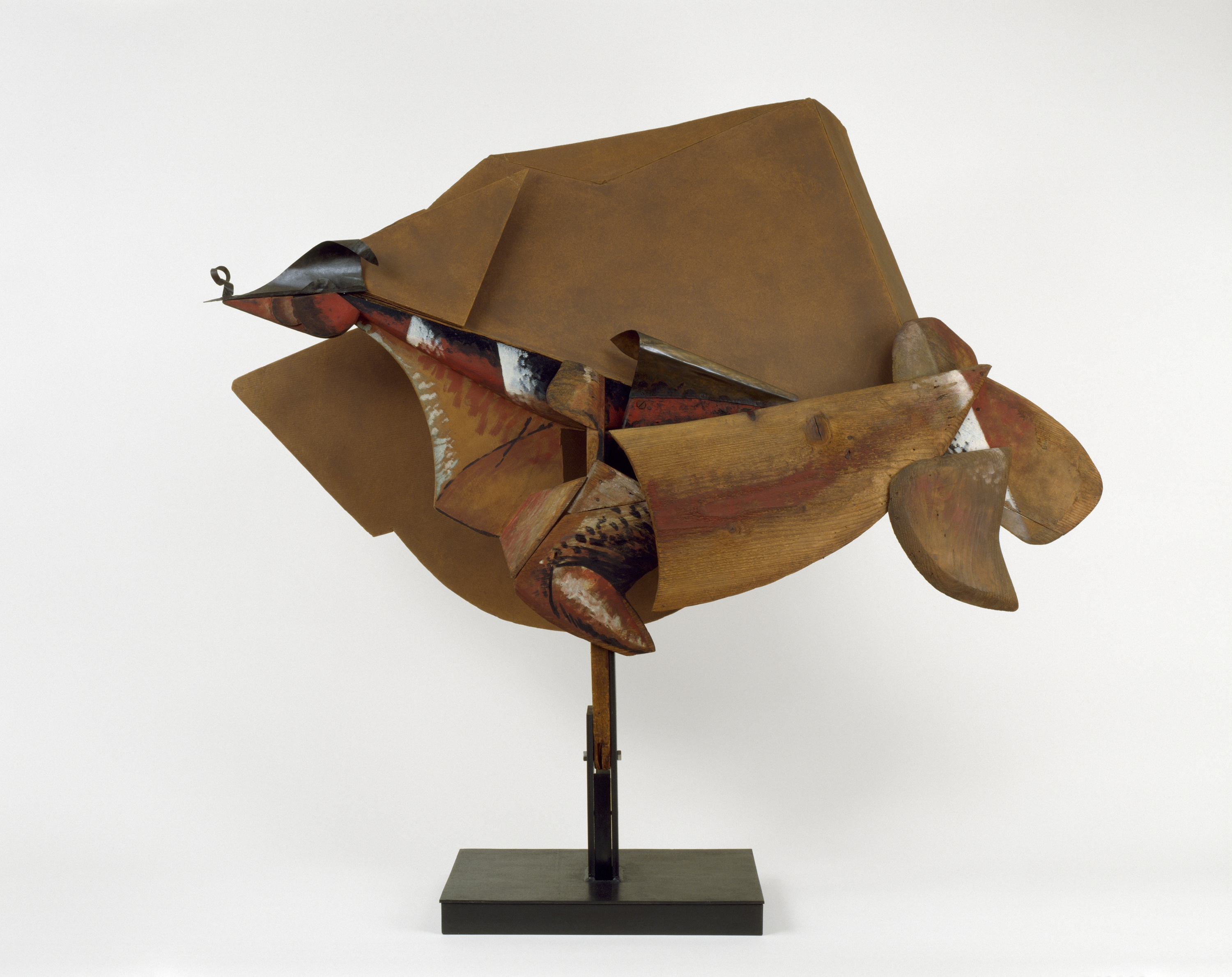
- Artist: Umberto Boccioni
- Year: 1914-1915
- Type: sculpture
- Medium: Gouache, oil, paper collage, wood, cardboard, copper, and iron, coated with tin or zinc
- Location: Peggy Guggenheim Collection; Venice

Dynamism of a speeding Horse + Houses is a sculpture from Umberto Boccioni created in 1915. It is one of the few surviving sculptured by Boccini since his death in 1926. The sculpture is now part of the Peggy Guggenheim Collection art museum in Venice.

== Description ==
In this artwork, Boccioni aims at representing his concept of space, where the inability to see distance means not to be able to perceive it. Consequently, a spinning horse and houses in the background appear the observer as single dynamic unity.

Umberto Boccioni sculpted Dynamism of a speeding Horse + Houses after publishing his manifesto on futurist sculpture technical rules. In the document the artist encourages the use of several and different materials, the idea of an interpenetration among subject and background and the refuse of closed forms.

== See also ==
- Futurist sculptures
- Italian Futurism
