= Dynamism of a Soccer Player =

Painting by Umberto Boccioni

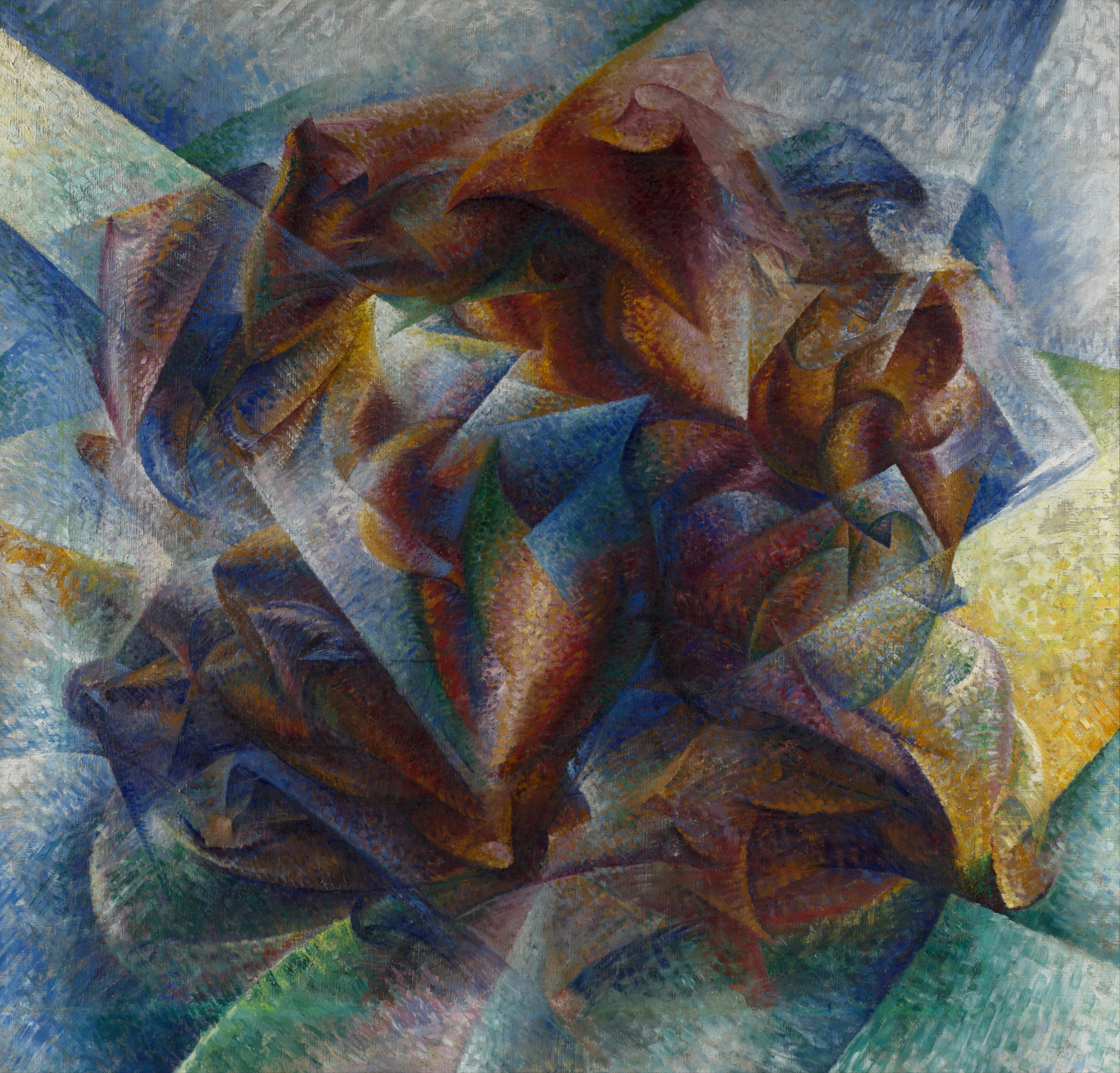
- Artist: Umberto Boccioni
- Year: 1913
- Medium: oil on canvas
- Dimensions: 193.2 cm × 201 cm (76.1 in × 79 in)
- Location: Museum of Modern Art, New York City

Dynamism of a Soccer Player is a 1913 Futurist oil painting by Italian artist Umberto Boccioni (1882–1916). It is held in the Museum of Modern Art in New York.

== Analysis ==
The painting depicts a dematerialized soccer player. The athlete's calf is seen in the center of the painting, and portions of other body parts can be seen around it. Due to its use of vibrant hues divided into sections, the painting gives the impression that rays of light are illuminating the subject. Furthermore, the painting's use of transparent and opaque overlapping shapes exhibits a Cubist influence. Dynamism of a Soccer Player demonstrates the following principle presented in Boccioni's Futurist Painting: Technical Manifesto, that "To paint a human figure you must not paint it; you must render the whole of its surrounding atmosphere ... movement and light destroy the materiality of bodies."
