= The Laugh =

Painting by Umberto Boccioni

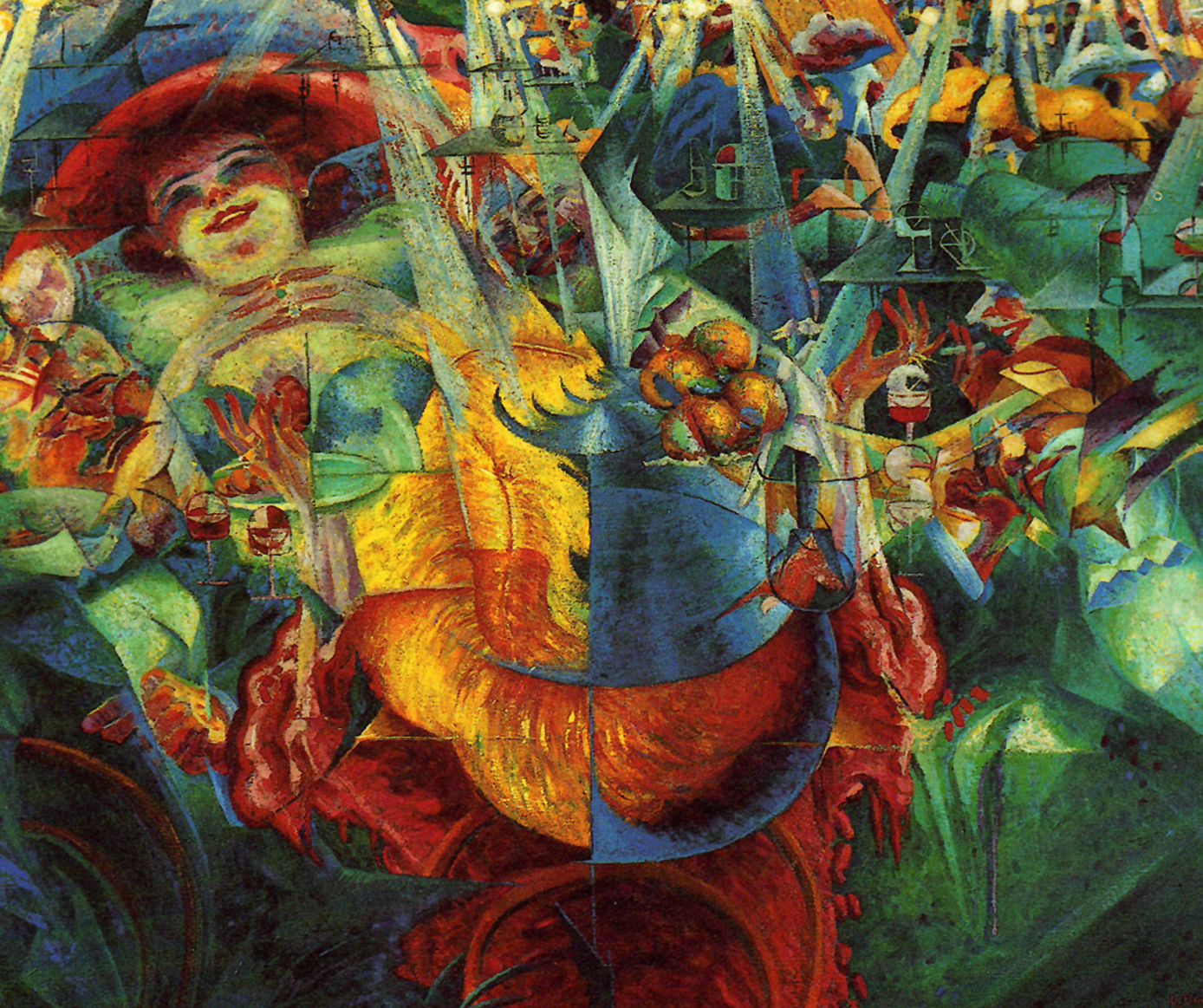
- Artist: Umberto Boccioni
- Year: 1911
- Medium: Oil on canvas
- Movement: Futurism
- Dimensions: 110.2 cm × 145.4 cm (43.4 in × 57.2 in)
- Location: Museum of Modern Art, New York City
- Website: www.moma.org/collection/works/80199

The Laugh (Italian: La risata), sometimes translated into English as Laughter, is a futurist painting by Umberto Boccioni. It is Boccioni's first truly futurist work, as he desired to break away from divisionist work.

== Description ==
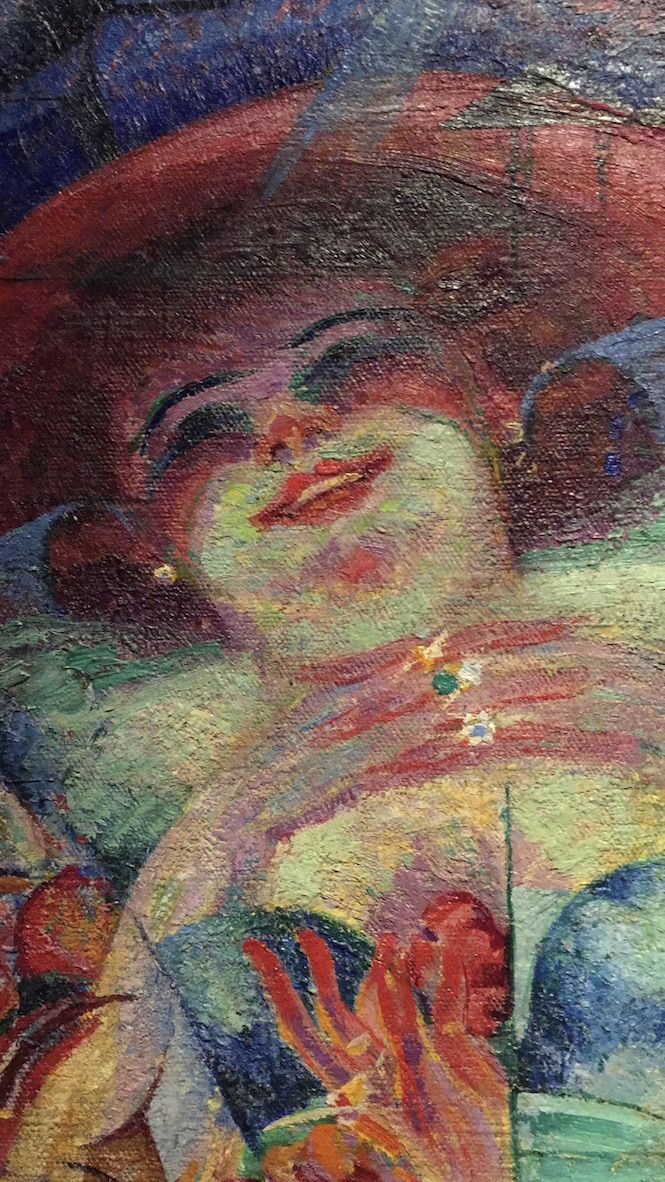
Detail of the woman's smile

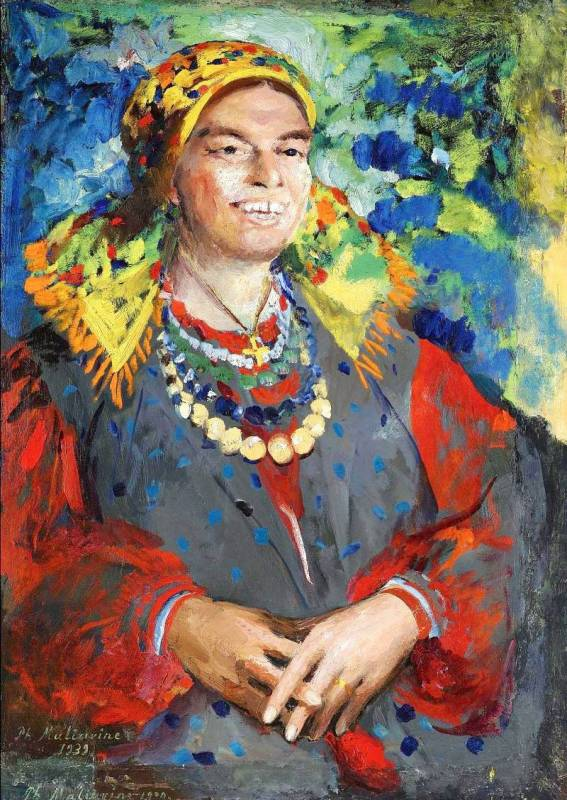
Laughing woman by Malyavin

The Laugh shows a vibrant scene of a woman conversing with a group of other women at night. They are in urban setting, and she is smiling with laughter. The primary colors used are shades of green, red, and blue. The woman is lit from below, giving her a sinister look.

The painting echoes The Laugh (1899) by Filipp Malyavin, in both subject matter and title. It is possible that this was a source of inspiration for Boccioni.

== Reception ==
The painting initially received negative reception. At the Ricordi Pavilion in Milan, The Laugh was defaced by a visitor, who ran their fingers through the wet paint, causing Boccioni to have to repaint it in 1912. As time progressed, the painting became more appreciated.
