= Three Women (Boccioni) =

Painting by Umberto Boccioni

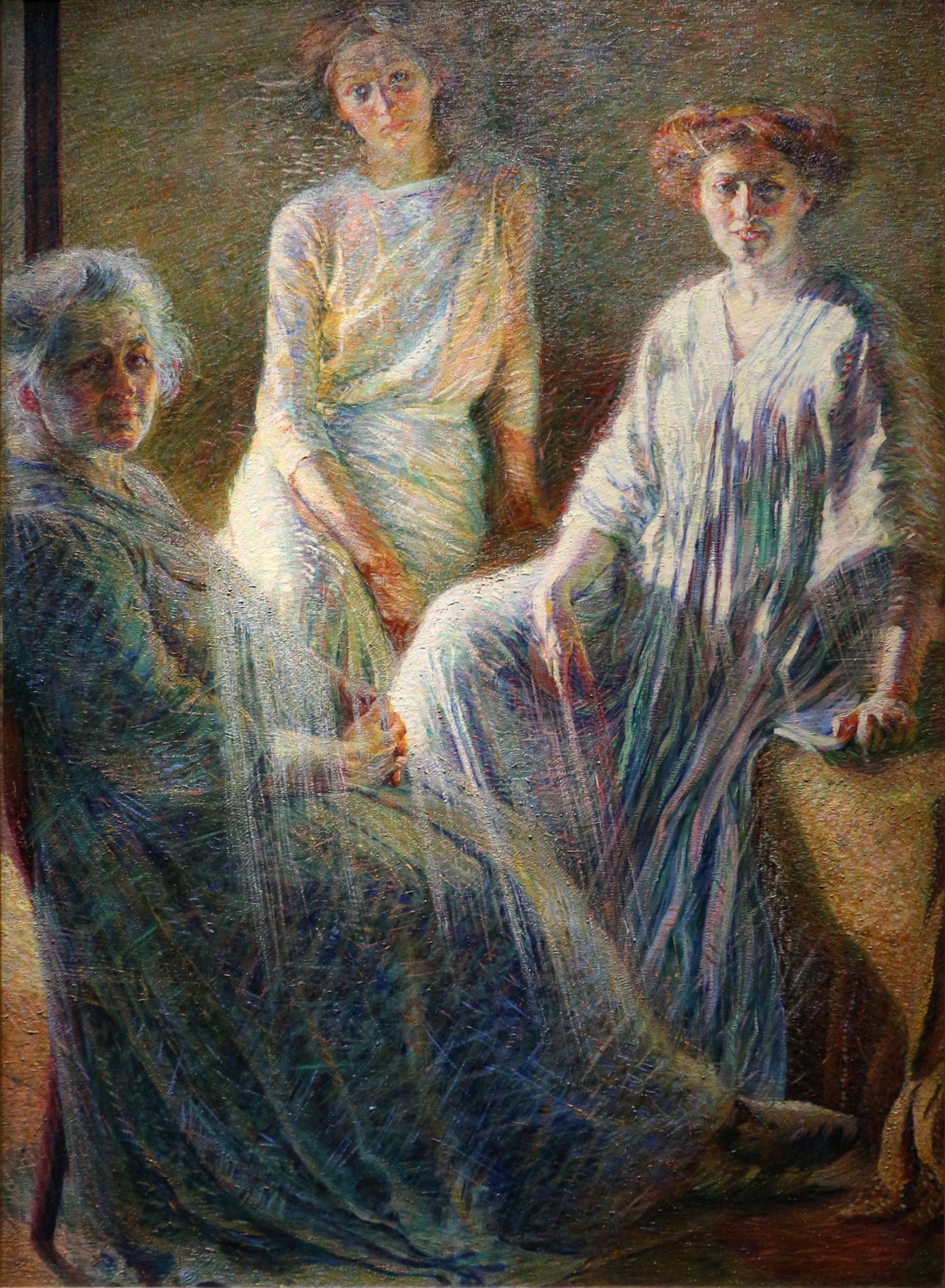
- Artist: Umberto Boccioni
- Year: 1909–1910
- Medium: Oil on canvas
- Dimensions: 180 cm × 132 cm (71 in × 52 in)
- Location: Banca Commerciale Italiana, Milan

Three Women (Italian: Tre donne) is a painting by Italian artist Umberto Boccioni, executed between 1909 and 1910. This painting is oil on canvas painted in the style of divisionism. Divisionism refers to the actual division of colors by creating separated brush strokes as opposed to smooth, solid lines. The painting contains three figures, one being Boccioni's mother Cecilia on the left, another being his sister, Amelia on the right, and the third being Ines, his lover, in the center.

== Transition ==
Art teacher and portraitist Giacomo Balla introduced Boccioni to the painting styles of divisionism. According to the Deutsche Bank and the Solomon R. Guggenheim Foundation, divisionism, which emerged in Northern Italy in the late 1880s, was the “painting method [that] was characterized by the juxtaposition of strokes of pigment to create the visual effect of intense single colors”. These individual strokes vary over the surface of the canvas, resembling “filament-like” threads. Divisionists also believed in increased luminosity in their paintings. As Boccioni was making the transition from divisionism to futurism, he struggled with changing his pre-futuristic subjects of art. This is because typical divisionism depicts rural labor, tranquility, beauty, and landscape. When Boccioni started to draw futuristic paintings, including industrialized scenes and urban modernity, he did not make the smoothest of transitions. Italian divisionism uses a variety of spectral colors to apply the paint in varied dots and strokes. However, divisionism varies from artist to artist; there are no guidelines. Sometime in the years between 1909 and 1910, Boccioni met Fillipo Tommaso Marinetti, the first futurist formulator. These two men, along with Carlo Carra, Luigi Russolo, Giacomo Balla, and Gino Severini decided to create The Technical Manifesto of Futurist Painters. This manifesto describes the theories that make up futurism as well as the guidelines that make a futuristic painting just that.

== Description ==
Three Women is one of Umberto Boccioni's paintings that portrayed evidence of his transformation from the divisionism style to the futurism style. Three Women is a painting that portrays raw emotion, with calmness and intimacy. The faces of the figures in the painting are dressed with melancholy tones. This painting is categorized as a divisionism painting, however there exists a futuristic style within it. The way that the light enters the room and affects the figures is an example of how this painting contains both divisionism and futurism. A characteristic of futurism lies in the varying and visible strokes as well. This aspect of futurism is extremely evident in this painting; it is seen in the women's dresses, the women's hair, the luminescence, the walls in the background, the bed, and the women's faces and skin. Also, the luminescence mentioned above, according to Maurizio Calvesi, may be in relation to Einstein's concepts of the physical properties of light, adding yet another futuristic aspect to Three Women, he says in 1967. According to Ester Coen, Three Women "marks a moment of transition in the artist’s work, the bridge from the suburbs of Milan to the idealistic vision of The City Rises".

== Sources ==
- Braun, Emily. Boccioni's Materia: A Futurist Masterpiece and the Avant-garde in Milan and Paris. New York: Guggenheim Museum Publications, 2004. Print.
- Clough, Rosa Trillo. Futurism: The Story of a Modern Art Movement, a New Appraisal. New York: Philosophical Library, 1961. Print.
- Coen, Ester, and Calvesi, Maurizio. Boccioni. Milano: Electa, 1983. Print.
- "Deutsche Guggenheim." Deutsche Guggenheim. N.p., n.d. Web. 22, Apr. 2015, http://pastexhibitions.guggenheim.org/boccioni/overview.html.
- Fraquelli, Simonetta. "Italian Divisionism 1890–1910". The Burlington Magazine [London] n.d.: n. pag. Cancer Weekly. The Burlington Magazine Publications Ltd., 24 Nov. 2009. Web. 24 Mar. 2015.
- "International Balzan Prize Foundation." International Balzan Prize Foundation. N.p., n.d. Web. 19 Apr. 2015, http://www.balzan.org/en/prizewinners/maurizio-calvesi/research-project-calvesi.
- Poggi, Christine. Inventing Futurism: The Art and Politics of Artificial Optimism. Princeton: Princeton UP, 2009. Print.
- Rainey, Lawrence S., Christine Poggi, and Laura Wittman. Futurism: An Anthology. New Haven: Yale UP, 2009. Print.
- Umberto Boccioni Biography, Art, and Analysis of Works. The Art Story. N.p., n.d. Web. 19 Apr. 2015, http://www.theartstory.org/artist-boccioni-umberto.htm.
