= Unique Forms of Continuity in Space =

1913 sculpture by Umberto Boccioni

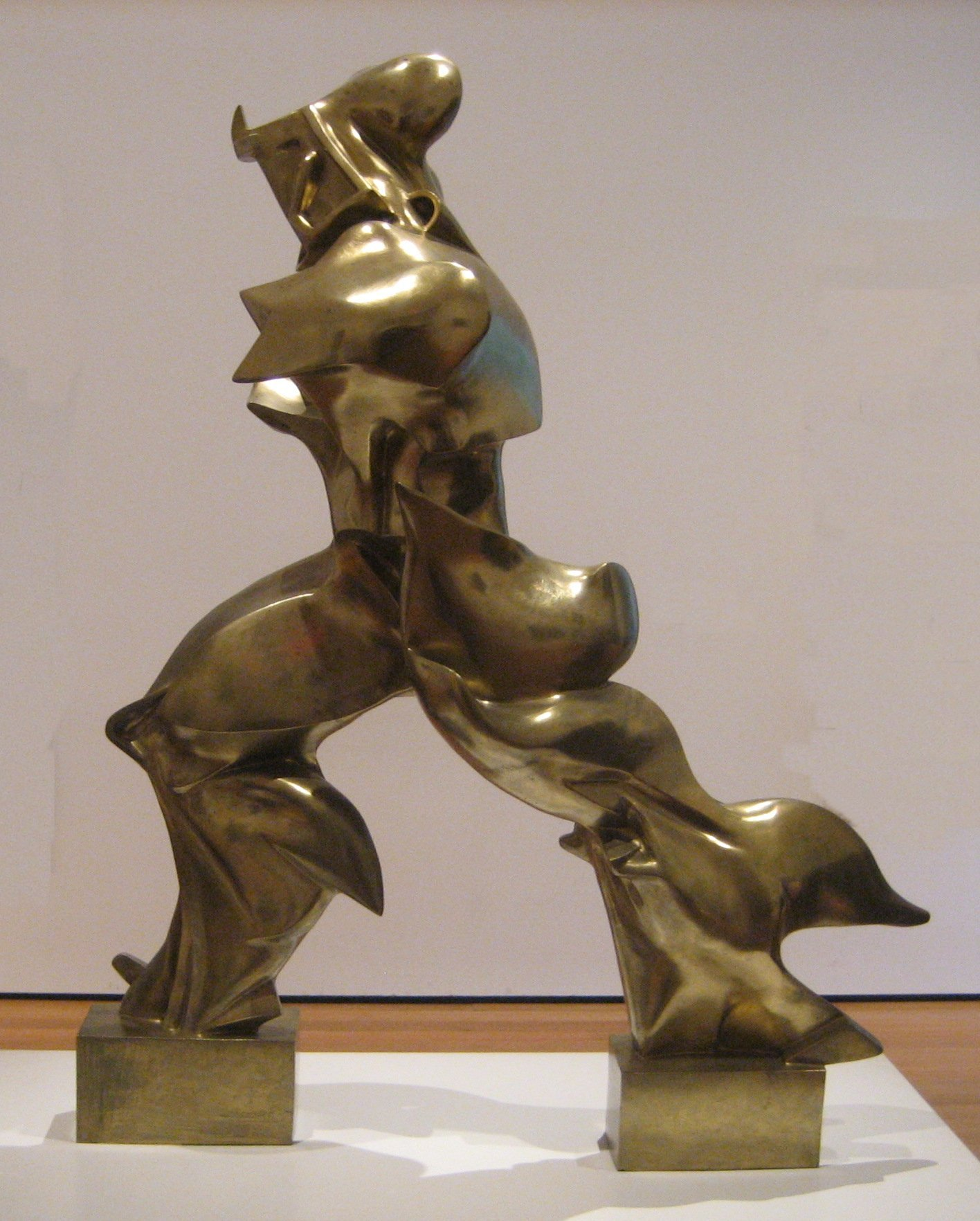
- 1931 or 1934 bronze cast displayed at the Museum of Modern Art in New York
- Artist: Umberto Boccioni
- Year: 1913
- Type: Bronze
- Dimensions: 111.44 cm (43.87 in)
- Location: Museu de Arte Contemporânea da Universidade de São Paulo (original plaster), São Paulo

Unique Forms of Continuity in Space (Italian: Forme uniche della continuità nello spazio) is a 1913 Futurist sculpture by Umberto Boccioni. It is seen as an expression of movement and fluidity. The sculpture is depicted on the obverse of the Italian-issue 20 cent euro coin.

== History ==
The Futurist movement was striving to portray speed and forceful dynamism in their art. Boccioni, though trained as a painter, began sculpting in 1912. He exclaimed that "these days I am obsessed by sculpture! I believe I have glimpsed a complete renovation of that mummified art." The following year Boccioni completed the sculpture. His goal for the work was to depict a "synthetic continuity" of motion instead of an "analytical discontinuity" that he saw in artists like František Kupka and Marcel Duchamp. In 1912–13, Boccioni created several other sculptures including his 1913 Development of a Bottle in Space.

== Composition ==
It seems clear to me that this succession is not to be found in repetition of legs, arms and faces, as many people have stupidly believed, but is achieved through the intuitive search for the unique form which gives continuity in space.

— Umberto Boccioni

Unique Forms of Continuity in Space depicts a human-like figure apparently in motion. The sculpture has an aerodynamic and fluid form. As a pedestal, two blocks at the feet connect the figure to the ground. The figure is also armless and without a discernibly real face. Andrew Graham-Dixon described the work: "Originally inspired by the sight of a football player moving on to a perfectly weighted pass, it is the quintessence of Boccioni’s serious, sensuous, philosophically contemplative art."

Though Boccioni apparently reviled traditional sculpture, Unique Forms of Continuity in Space does resemble more realist works. It is reminiscent of the classical Winged Victory of Samothrace, which Filippo Marinetti, founder of Futurism, declared was inferior in beauty to a roaring car. The lack of arms also pays homage to Auguste Rodin's Walking Man.

== Original plaster and casts ==
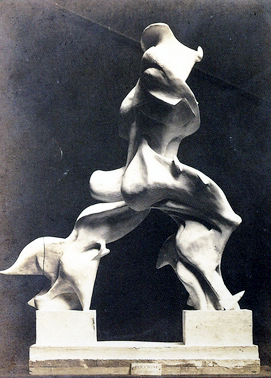
Original plaster, photo from Estado de São Paulo newspaper, 1913.

Boccioni's work was in plaster, and was never cast into bronze in his lifetime. His original plaster is displayed at the Museu de Arte Contemporânea in São Paulo. Two bronze casts were made in 1931, one of which is displayed at the Museum of Modern Art in Manhattan. Two more were made in 1949, one of which is displayed at the Metropolitan Museum of Art in New York and other one at the Museum of Twentieth Century in Milan. Two also were made in 1972, one of which is displayed at the Tate Modern in London. Another eight, in 1972, were made not from the plaster original, but from one of the 1949 bronze casts. One bronze cast is in the Kröller-Müller Museum in Otterlo, Netherlands. In 2014, a bronze was donated to the National Gallery of Cosenza.

== Influence ==
In 1981, the sculpture inspired the design of the Melkur in the Doctor Who serial The Keeper Of Traken.

In David Foster Wallace's short story 'The Suffering Channel', characters propose the sculpture's shape as a possible test for the faecal artist whom the story concerns.

In 2009, Italian composer Carlo Forlivesi in collaboration with Stefano Fossati, Director of the Italian Cultural Institute in Melbourne, created an international composition competition and workshop titled Unique Forms of Continuity in Space (Forme Uniche della Continuità nello Spazio), commemorating the hundredth anniversary of Italian Futurism. With a name which brings to mind Boccioni's piece, the initiative, organised on an annual basis, celebrates the power of musical composition mingled with the strength of the Italian language. The international composition competition and workshop Unique Forms of Continuity in Space aims to contribute to the creation of a large and eclectic body of art works, with particular significance for the relationship between music and poetry.

In 2018, the sculpture was used as the basis of the trophy presented to the winner of the virtual Gran Turismo World Series sim racing competition held in the Gran Turismo series of racing games. The sculpture was chosen because it represents the surprise and fascination of machines discovered in the beginning of the 20th century, and shares values with Gran Turismo. Polyphony Digital, the creators of the Gran Turismo series, used laser scanning methods to create an accurate replication of the sculpture.

=== Gallery ===
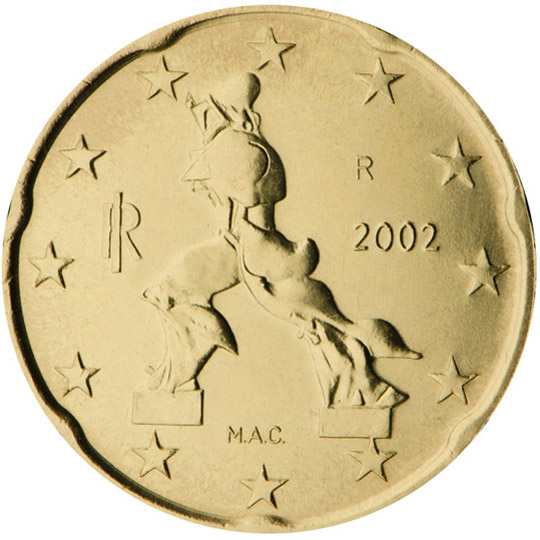
Sculpture on 20 euro cent coin

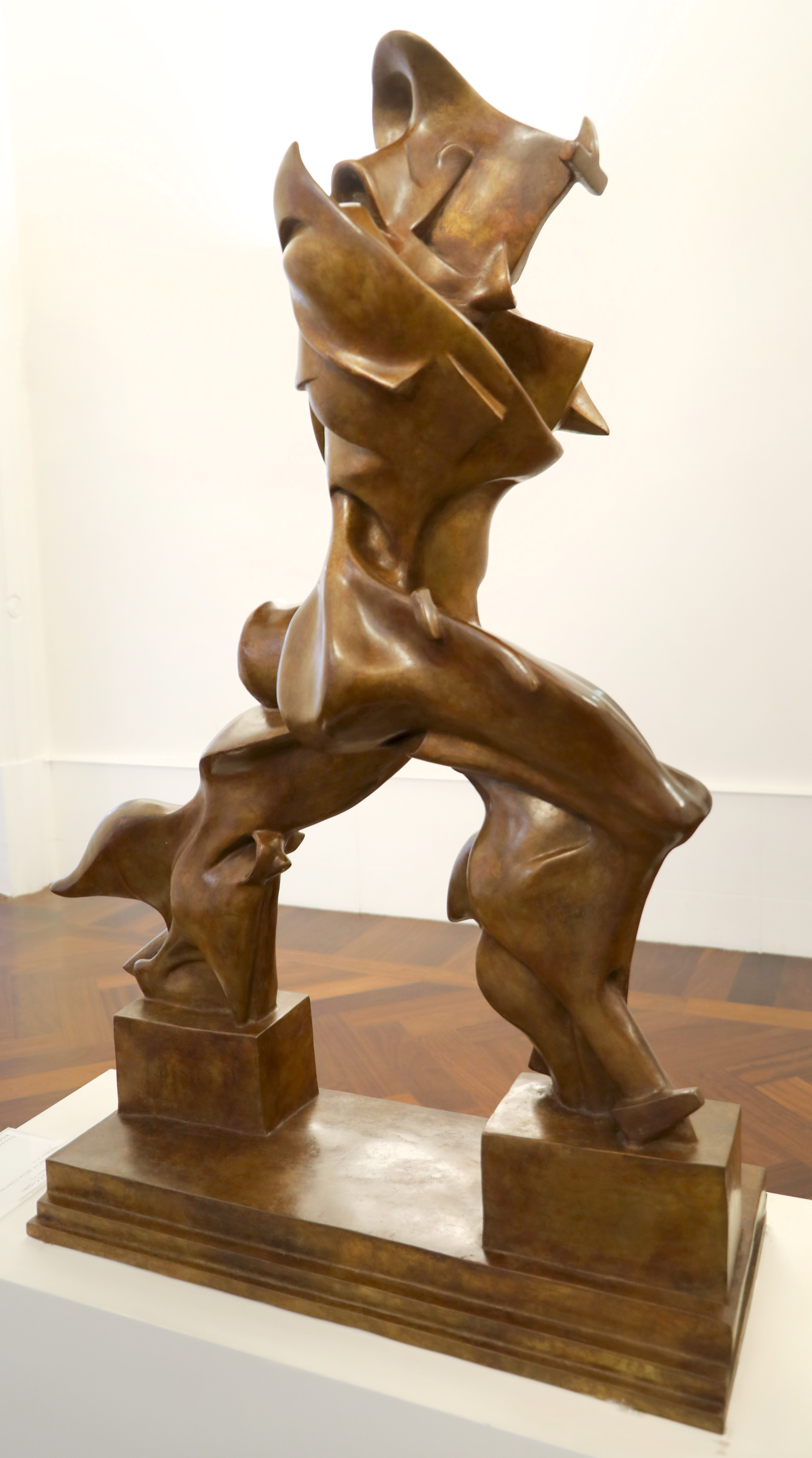
Sculpture in museum

== See also ==
- Antigrazioso
