= Antigrazioso =

Sculpture by Umberto Boccioni

Antigrazioso (The Mother)
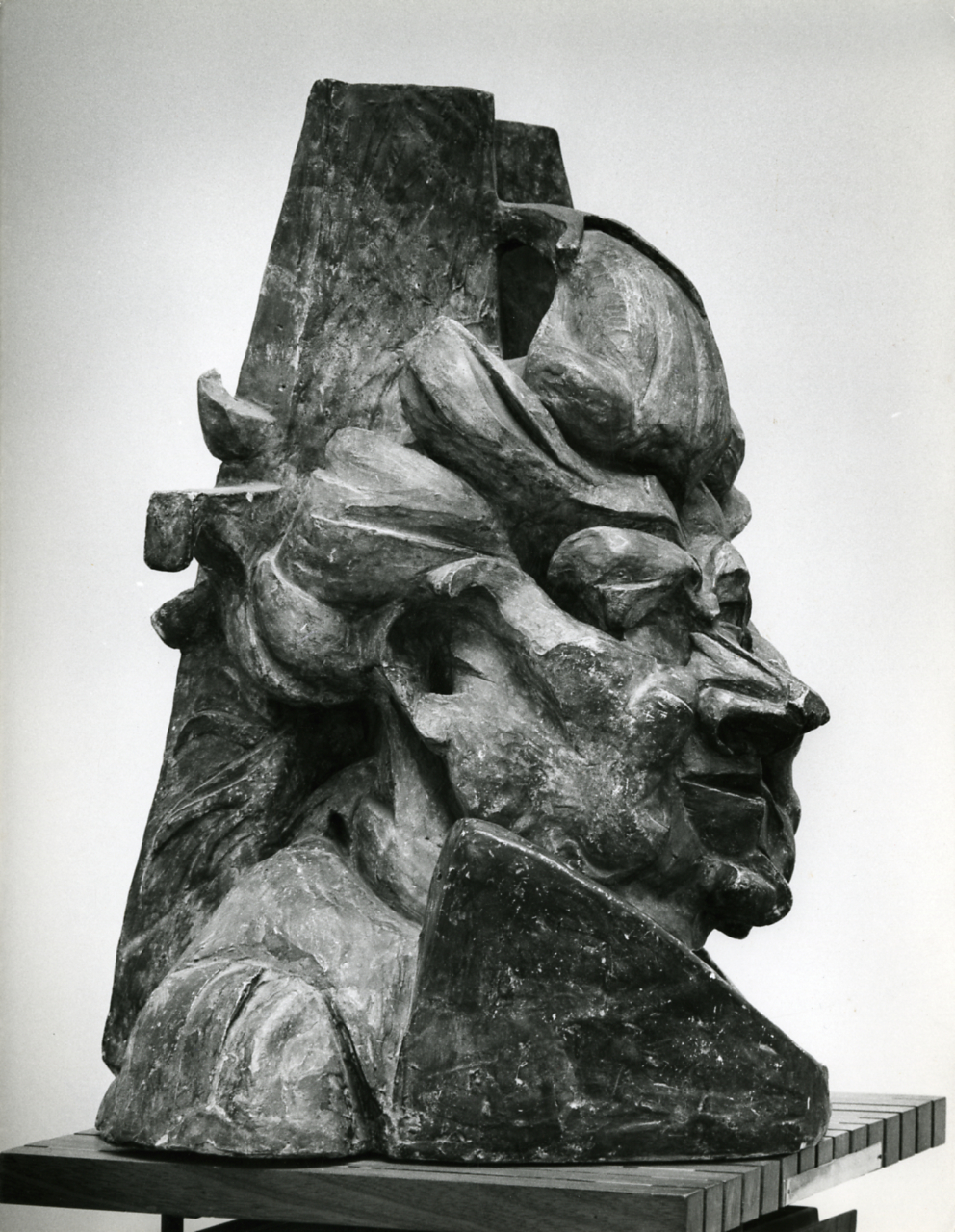
- The original artwork photographed by Paolo Monti in 1978
- Artist: Umberto Boccioni
- Year: 1912 - 1913
- Type: sculpture
- Medium: patinated gesso
- Dimensions: 58 cm × 50 cm (23 in × 20 in); cm 50 x 40 x h58
- Location: Galleria nazionale d'arte moderna e contemporanea, Rome

Antigrazioso or L'antigrazioso (Italian for The Anti-graceful), also known as The Mother (La madre), is a patinated gesso sculpture by Umberto Boccioni realized between 1912 and 1913. It is located in the Galleria nazionale d'arte moderna e contemporanea of Rome.

The bust is one of the few surviving examples of Futurist sculptures made by Boccioni in 1912 and 1913 and exhibited at the Galerie 23 in Paris in 1913.

== History ==
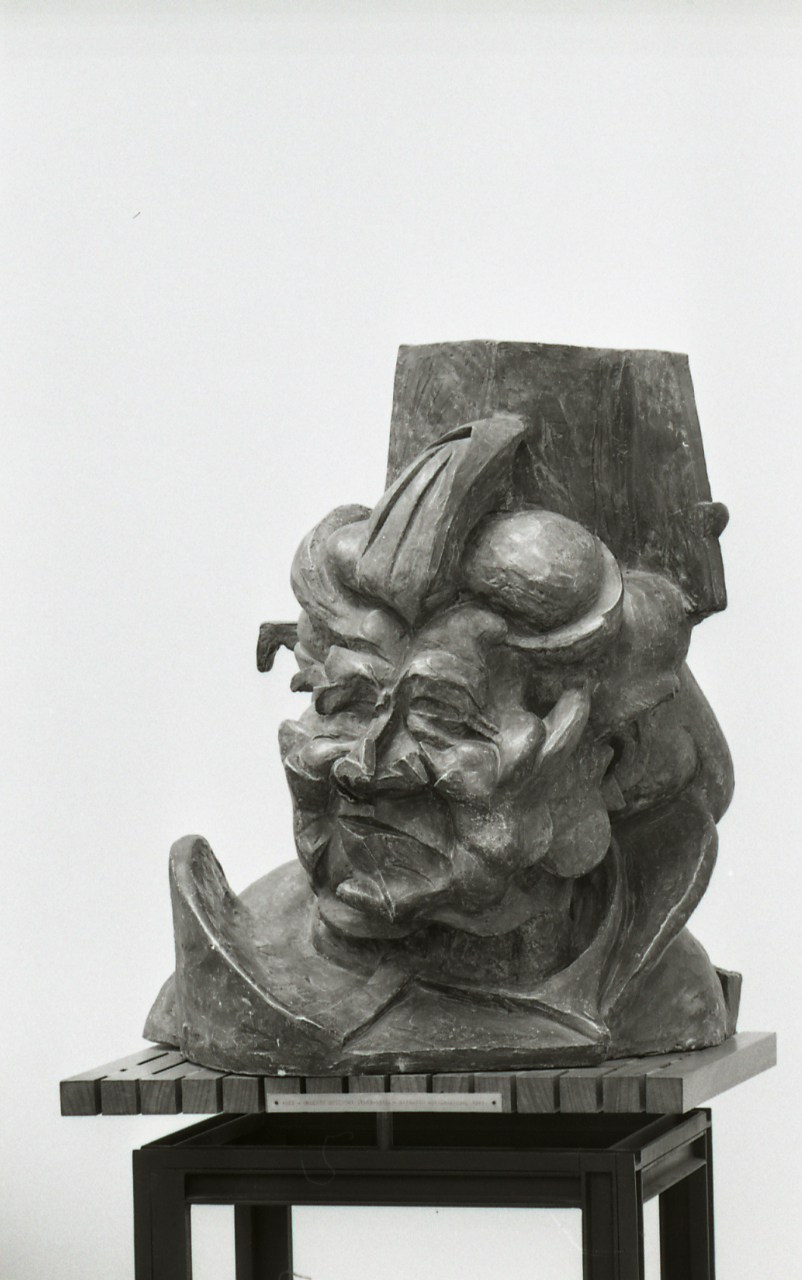
The original gesso. Photo by Paolo Monti, 1978.

The original gesso, exhibited since 1938 in the Galleria nazionale d'arte moderna, was acquired in 1950 by the museum from Benedetta Marinetti.

== Description ==
The sculpture represents the futurist decomposition of the face of the artist's beloved mother, also portrayed in the 1913 painting Materia. Boccioni also executed a 1913 painting with the same title, Antigrazioso, but with a different setting.

The sculpture has a similar style of Unique Forms of Continuity in Space.

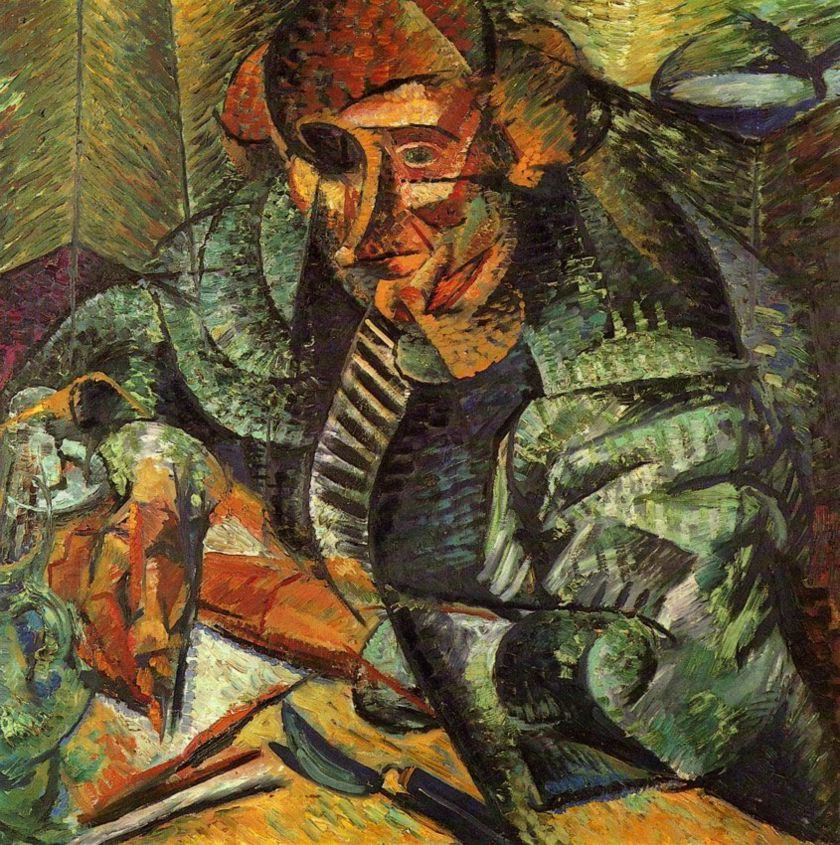
Umberto Boccioni, L'antigrazioso, painting, 1912

== Bronze cast ==
In 1950-1951, a bronze casting of the artwork was made. It was acquired and exhibited by the Metropolitan Museum of New York.

== See also ==
- Unique Forms of Continuity in Space
