= Development of a Bottle in Space =

Sculpture by Umberto Boccioni

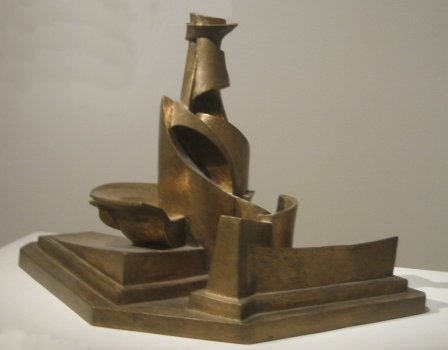
- Artist: Umberto Boccioni
- Year: 1913
- Type: Bronze
- Dimensions: 39.5 cm × 39.5 cm × 60.3 cm (15.6 in × 15.6 in × 23.7 in)
- Location: Museum of Modern Art, New York Museo del Novecento, Milan

Development of a Bottle in Space (Italian: Sviluppo di una bottiglia nello spazio) is a bronze futurist sculpture by Umberto Boccioni. Initially a sketch in Boccioni’s "Technical Manifesto of Futurist Sculpture"," the design was later cast into bronze by Boccioni himself in the year 1913. Consistent with many of themes in Boccioni’s manifesto, the work of art highlights the artist’s first successful attempt at creating a sculpture that both molds and encloses space within itself.

== History and Inspiration ==
Much of Boccioni’s inspiration in creating the work can be accredited to the publication of Filippo Tommaso Marinetti’s "Futurist Manifesto". Marinetti, often credited as the founder of futurism as an artistic and literary movement, produced the manifesto in 1909, which would later serve as the foundation for Boccioni’s very own "Technical Manifesto of Futurist Sculpture". Marinetti in his manifesto expresses a passionate loathing of everything old, especially classical and neo-classical artistic traditions. To break with traditional notions, futurists admired and emphasized elements of modern society: speed, technology, youth and violence, the car, the airplane, the industrial city, all that represented the technological triumph of humanity over nature. Boccioni, in his manifesto pertaining to sculptural works, emphasized many of the same ideals as Marinetti, but unlike Marinetti applied the ideals discussed in his manifesto in the works he produced.

The subject matter of Boccioni’s work, a deconstructed glass bottle, fits into the framework of futurism, a movement largely obsessed with recent technological innovations. Technology to mass-produce glass bottles was first implemented in the latter portion of the 19th century and began rapidly expanding around the time Boccioni began to formulate his work in 1912. Boccioni first provided a sketch of Development of a Bottle in Space in his manifesto, as an example of a work that deconstructs the three-dimensional space in and around itself. A year later Boccioni would take his initial sketch and use it as the basis to produce the work’s recognizable form as a bronze sculpture. Once exhibited at the Panama–Pacific International Exposition in San Francisco (1915), Development of a Bottle in Space, has since become part of the collection at the Museum of Modern Art in New York City. An original bronze cast (1935) is displayed at the Museo del Novecento in Milan.

== Composition ==
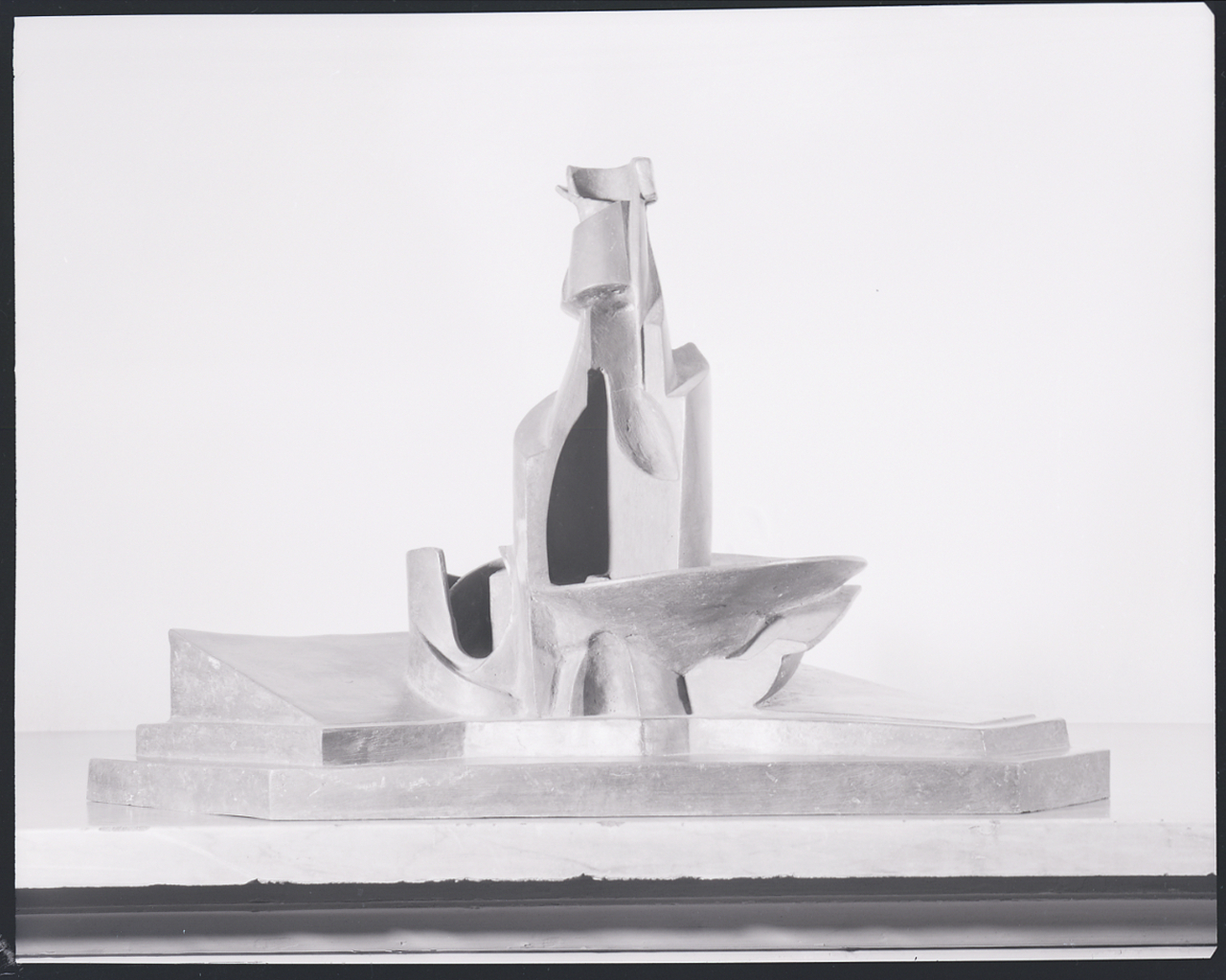
Photo by Paolo Monti, 1969

The sculpture was originally cast as a silvery bronze bottle, but was then intentionally stripped open and sculpted, a process that involved breaking the bottle into winding sections and combining absolute and relative motion to give it a rotary appearance. The finished sculpture is 15 ½ inches tall and sits on a quadrilateral base of length 23 ¾ inches and width 15 ½ inches (39.4 x 60.3 x 39.4 cm). The bottle is shown sitting on a much larger base, on what is believed to be the machinery used in the production of glass bottles. The smaller, hollowed out cylindrical mass next to the bottle takes the appearance of an empty container, one that would appear on the conveyor belt of such a machine. The bottle itself, however, is shown as a three quarter cross section, showing the object prior to completion, as it is still being molded.

== Boccioni's Interpretation ==
Boccioni proclaimed his intention to “open the figure like a window and include it in the milieu in which it lives.” He also stated in his manifesto his desire to “proclaim the absolute and complete abolition of finite lines and the contained statue.” The chaotic and twisting nature of the work may be meant to embody dynamism and is reminiscent of Boccioni’s painting Dynamism of a Football Player (Italian: Dinanismo di un foot baller) produced in the same year. Dynamism, an emergent theme in futurist art, is best explained by Boccioni in the "Technical Manifesto of Futurist Painting" (1910), written with the aid of other leading futurists:

“All things move, all things run. A profile is never motionless before our eyes, but it constantly appears and disappears. On account of the persistency of an image on the retina, moving objects constantly multiply themselves; their form changes, like rapid vibrations, in their mad career. Thus a running horse has not four legs, but twenty, and their movements are triangular.” --Umberto Boccioni, "Technical Manifesto of Futurist Painting" (1910)

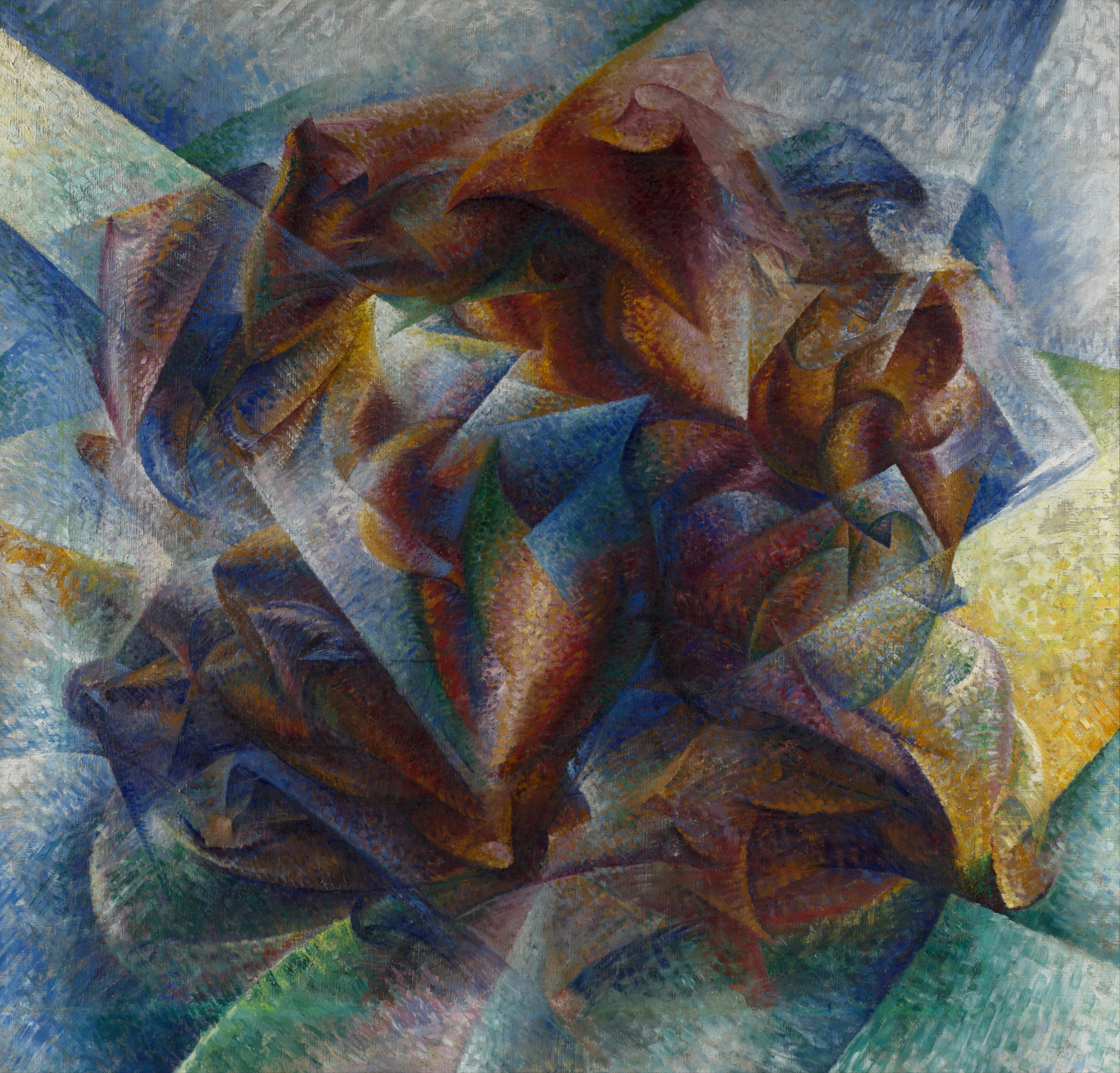
Dynamism of a Soccer Player (1913)

It also been suggested that the base the bottle rests on is not any part of a machine, but rather the bottle is seen blending into its natural setting, perhaps it is resting on a table(?). The practice of isolating an individual object was seen as ridiculous and non-representational according to futurists. Umberto Boccioni explained his vision for the piece in the preface of the catalogue for the First Exhibit of Futurist Sculpture in Paris (1913) by stressing the need for “the fusion of the environment with the object” in order to “make the figure live in its environment without making it a slave to a supporting base.” Boccioni argued that things do not simply exist in isolation, but obtain their most fundamental properties from their surroundings:

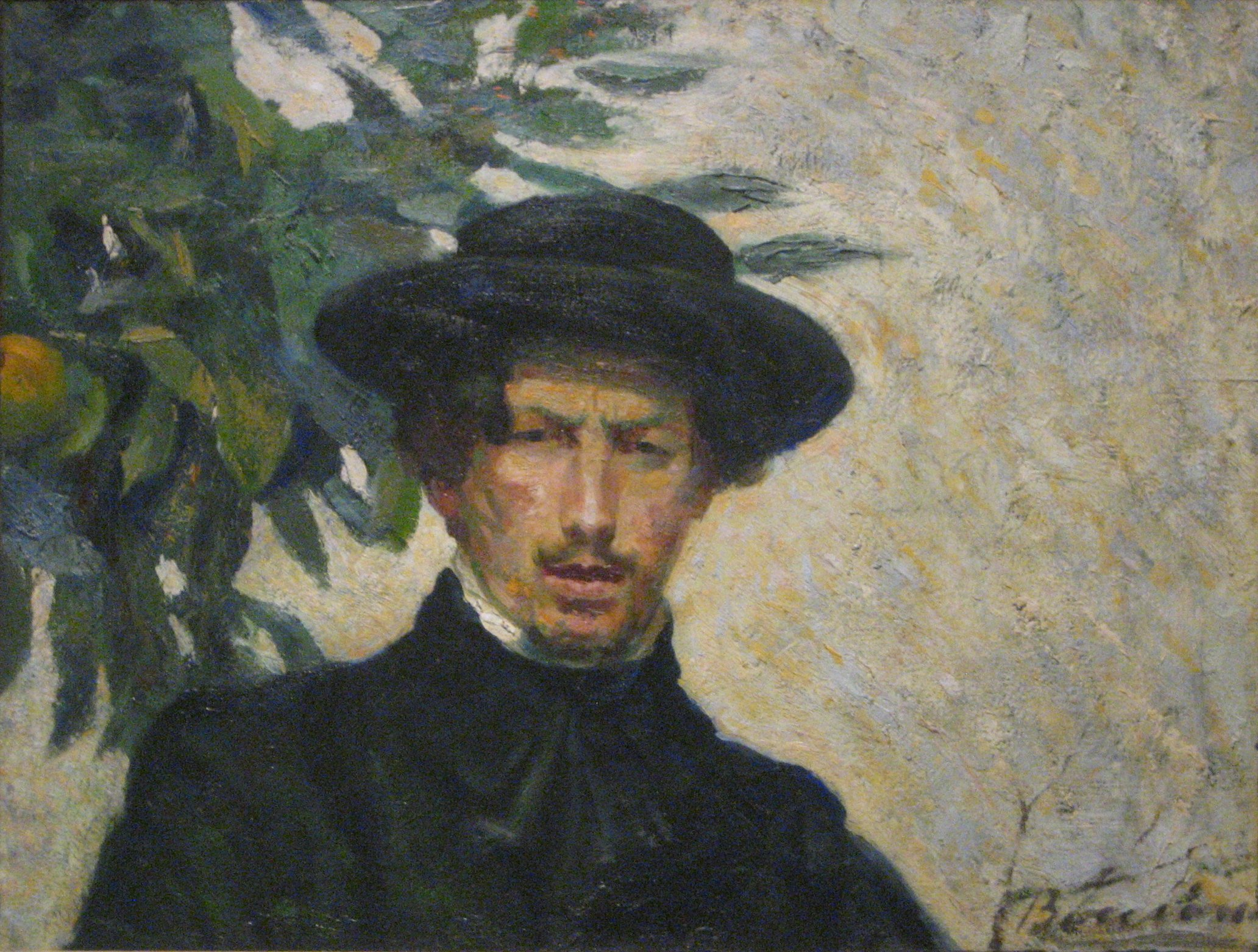
Self portrait of Umberto Boccioni (1905)

“Our bodies penetrate the sofas upon which we sit, and the sofas penetrate our bodies. The motor bus rushes into the houses which it passes, and in their turn the houses throw themselves upon the motor bus and are blended with it.” -- Umberto Boccioni, "Technical Manifesto of Futurist Painting" (1910)

== Other Interpretations ==
Various other interpretations have been made over the years by art historians regarding Boccioni’s intentions in creating the work. Donald Kuspit, Professor of Art and Philosophy, Ph.D, University of Michigan, theorizes that the sculpture’s rhythmic movement suggests a more sexual connotation that is “inherent rather than imposed.” He compares this sculpture to Duchamp’s “Nude Descending a Staircase, No. 2” (1912) which symbolizes masturbation. Marjorie Perloff, author of “The Futurist Movement” (1986) states in her book that the sculpture does not represent one single bottle, but rather a series of bottle shaped shells, hollowed out and fit into each other. She refers to the sculpture’s base as a “concave shape with a simple unbroken profile,” a description that supports Boccioni’s theory of a center within the object itself. Conflicting with Boccioni’s concept of dynamism, Rosalind Krauss, author of Passages in Modern Sculpture (1981), describes the sculpture as a “symbol of invariance.” Krauss comments that “The sculpture dramatizes a conflict between the poverty of information contained in the single view of the object and the totality of the vision that is basic to any serious claim to know it.”
