= Bicycles in art =

Depiction and use of bicycles in the visual arts

The bicycle as a subject and medium dates back to advertising in the 1890s and lifestyle imagery of modern leisure. In the early 20th century, Duchamp's Bicycle Wheel (1913) was used in his found object sculpture. Picasso's Bull's Head (1942) sculpture used bicycle parts. Street artists such as Ernest Zacharevic incorporated real bikes into their wall paintings. Ghost bikes, which began in the early 2000s, are painted white and used to memorialize cyclists killed, as well as mark the location as dangerous for cyclists.

== 19th century and Belle Époque ==
Henri de Toulouse-Lautrec, La Chaîne Simpson (1896), poster advertising a bicycle chain

Advertising was a primary driver of artistic posters such as Toulouse-Lautrec's La Chaîne Simpson (1896). The German Museum of Technology said that by 1900 more posters had been made to sell bicycles than any other product.

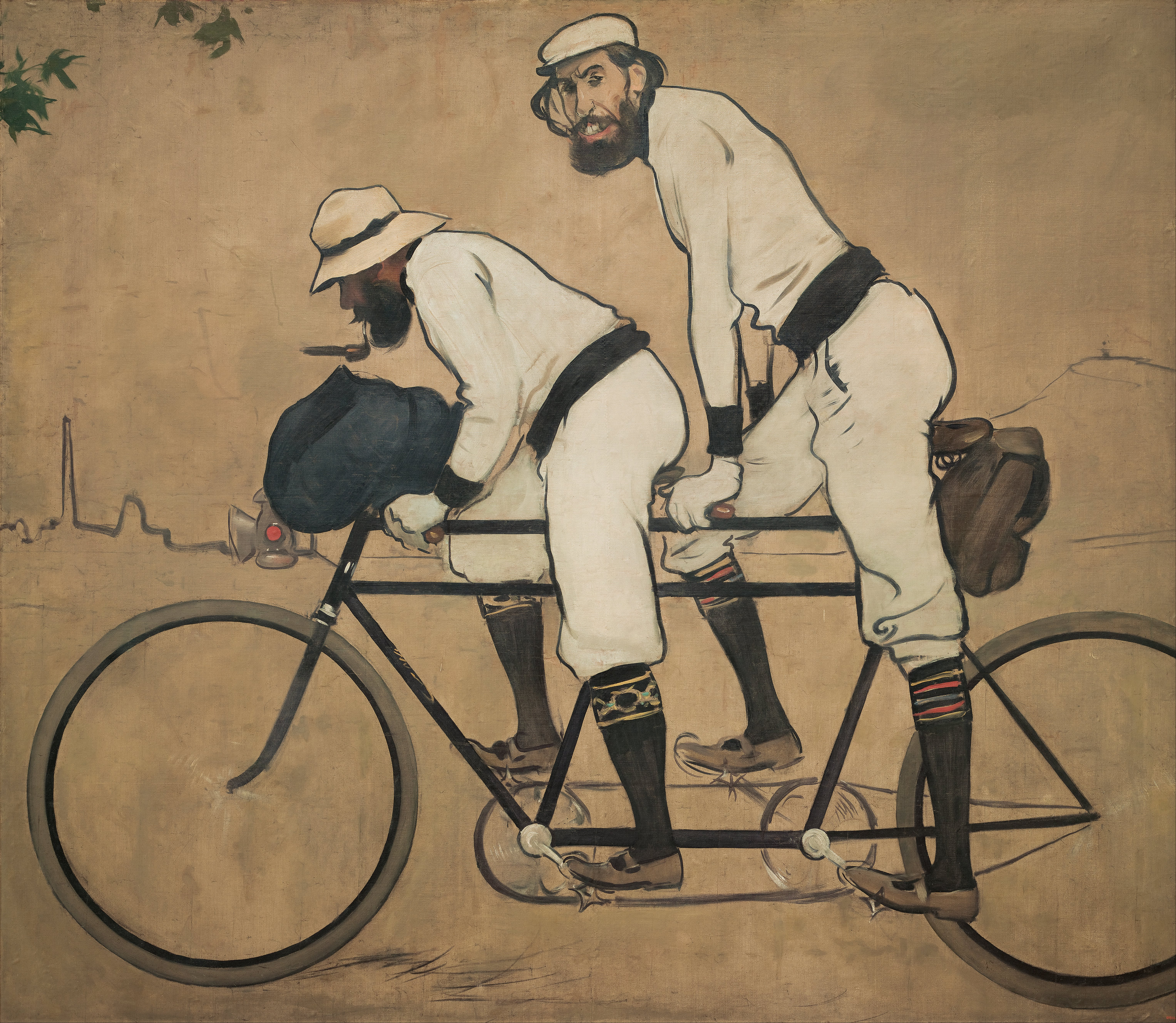
Ramon Casas, Ramon Casas and Pere Romeu on a Tandem (1897)

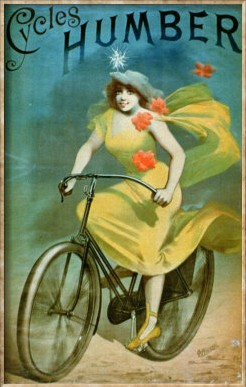
Jules Chéret, Cycles Humber (1895)

Women often appeared on posters, and artists such as Jean de Paléologue and Jules Chéret portrayed them as free and independent. According to the German Museum of Technology, cycling "was still considered inappropriate for women," and the posters' "poster ladies" "aimed to counter such prejudices."

== Modernism and the avant-garde ==
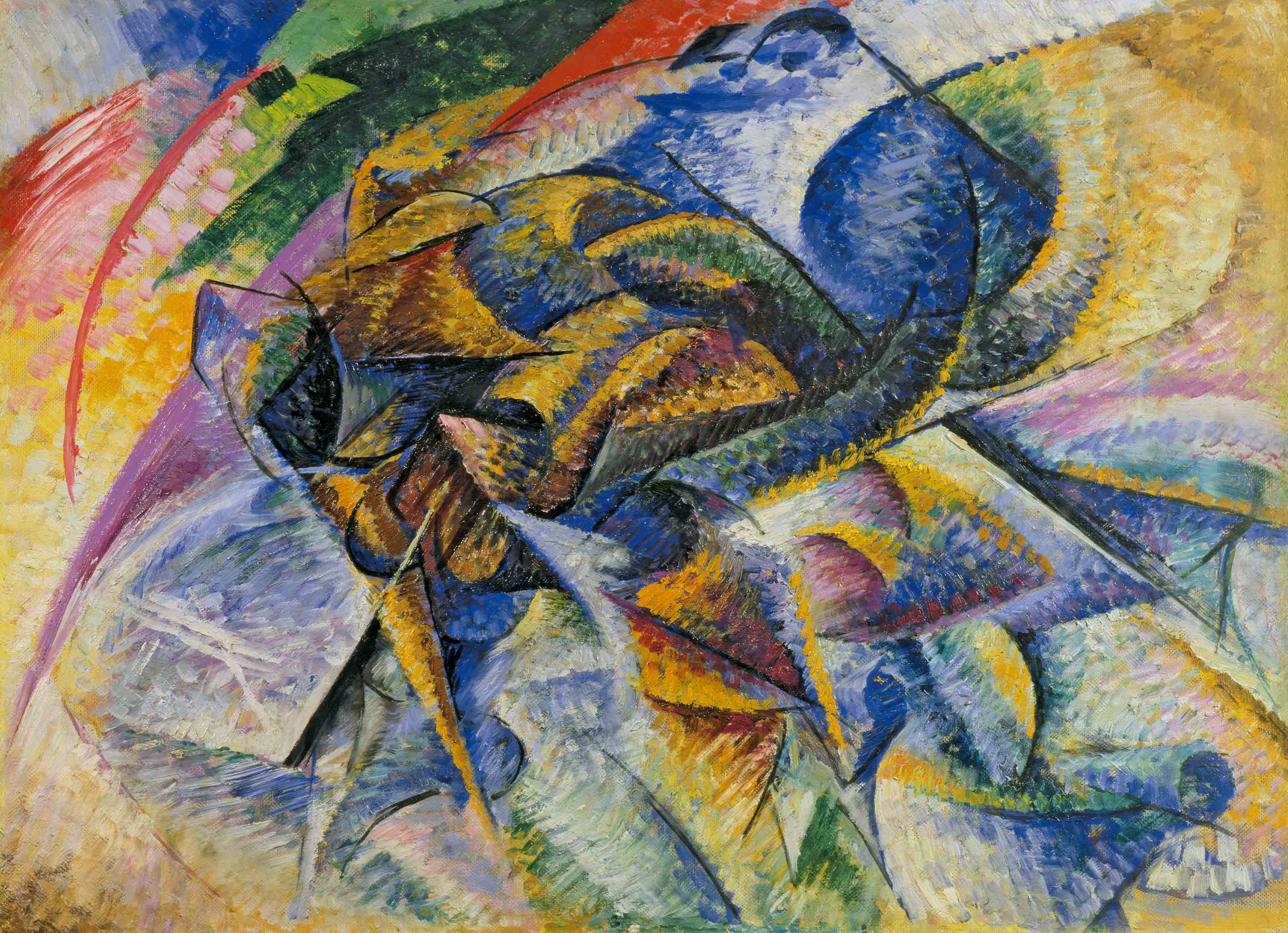
Umberto Boccioni, Dynamism of a Cyclist (1913)

For the Futurists, the racing cyclist was a new subject for depicting the human form in motion and became a vehicle for depicting speed. Marcel Duchamp's Nude Descending a Staircase (1912) drew on Muybridge's and Marey's photographs of motion. In 1913 he fixed a bicycle wheel to a kitchen stool in his Paris studio, later saying "the idea of movement, you see, just transferred from the Nude into a bicycle wheel." Bicycle Wheel is regarded as his first readymade. Umberto Boccioni's Dynamism of a Cyclist (1913) shows the rider's body deformed by speed. Fernand Léger returned to cyclists in the 1940s and 1950s, in paintings such as Les Loisirs – Hommage à Louis David (1948–1949), which shows a family at leisure with two bicycles.

In Russia, the State Russian Museum describes Natalia Goncharova's Cyclist (1913) as "often regarded as one of the archetypal works of Futurist painting".

In 1942 Picasso made Bull's Head from a bicycle seat and handlebars he found in a pile of objects, and said, "In a flash, they joined together in my head." He described it as reversible: a cyclist could come along and turn it back into a seat and handlebars, "back and forth, for an eternity."

== Postwar and contemporary art ==
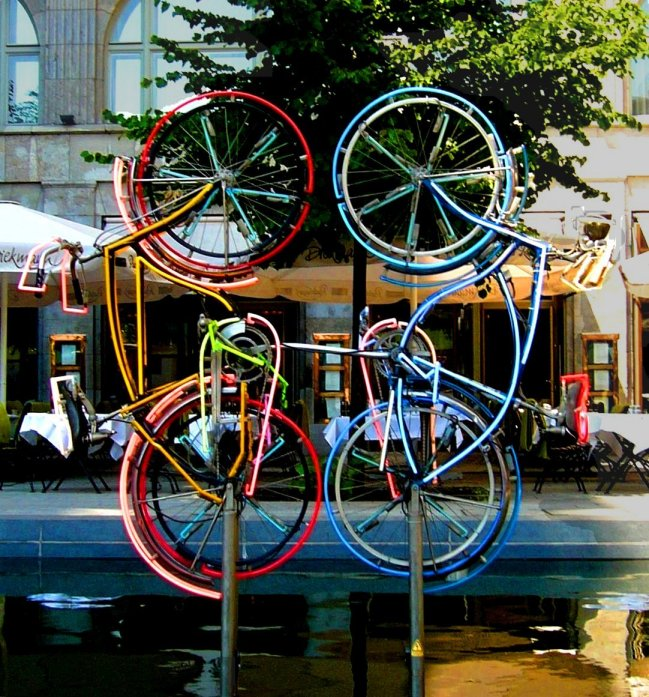
Robert Rauschenberg, Riding Bikes (1998)

Robert Rauschenberg said Duchamp's Bicycle Wheel "has always struck me as one of the most beautiful masterpieces of sculpture that I have ever seen." His Bicycloids series (1992–1994) outlined vintage bicycles in colored neon on aluminum bases. Claes Oldenburg likewise traced his Sculpture in the Form of a Bicycle Saddle (1976), a glazed ceramic saddle standing upright in sand, back to Picasso: "The role of a bicycle seat as sculpture goes back, of course, to Picasso's Head of a Bull."

Jean Tinguely's Cyclograveur (1961), a drawing machine built from scrap bicycle parts that the viewer pedals, was shown in Amsterdam that year with Duchamp's Bicycle Wheel on the catalogue cover, and Tinguely was presented as Duchamp's heir. Gabriel Orozco's Four Bicycles (There Is Always One Direction) (1994) joins four bicycles so they point in every direction. Chen Zhen's Precipitous Parturition (1999), a dragon woven from bicycle inner tubes and toy cars, comments on China's shift from a nation of bicycles to a nation of cars. Guy Ben-Ner's I'd give it to you if I could, but I borrowed it (2007), made for Skulptur Projekte Münster, has viewers pedal stationary bikes to play a film in which he and his children take apart replicas of Picasso's Bull's Head, Duchamp's Bicycle Wheel and Tinguely's Cyclograveur, then build a working bicycle from the parts and ride it through Münster.

Ai Weiwei's Forever Bicycles, named after Yong Jiu ("forever"), China's foremost bicycle brand, are sculptures of interlocking bicycles made for large-scale installations in public spaces, such as Toronto's Nuit Blanche in 2013, consisting of 3,144 interconnected bicycles. Ai recalled that growing up in China, the bicycle "was seen as the most glamorous vehicle," and said that joined together by their own structure, the bikes "become something very different. It's like a big crowd there."

== Public art and street interventions ==
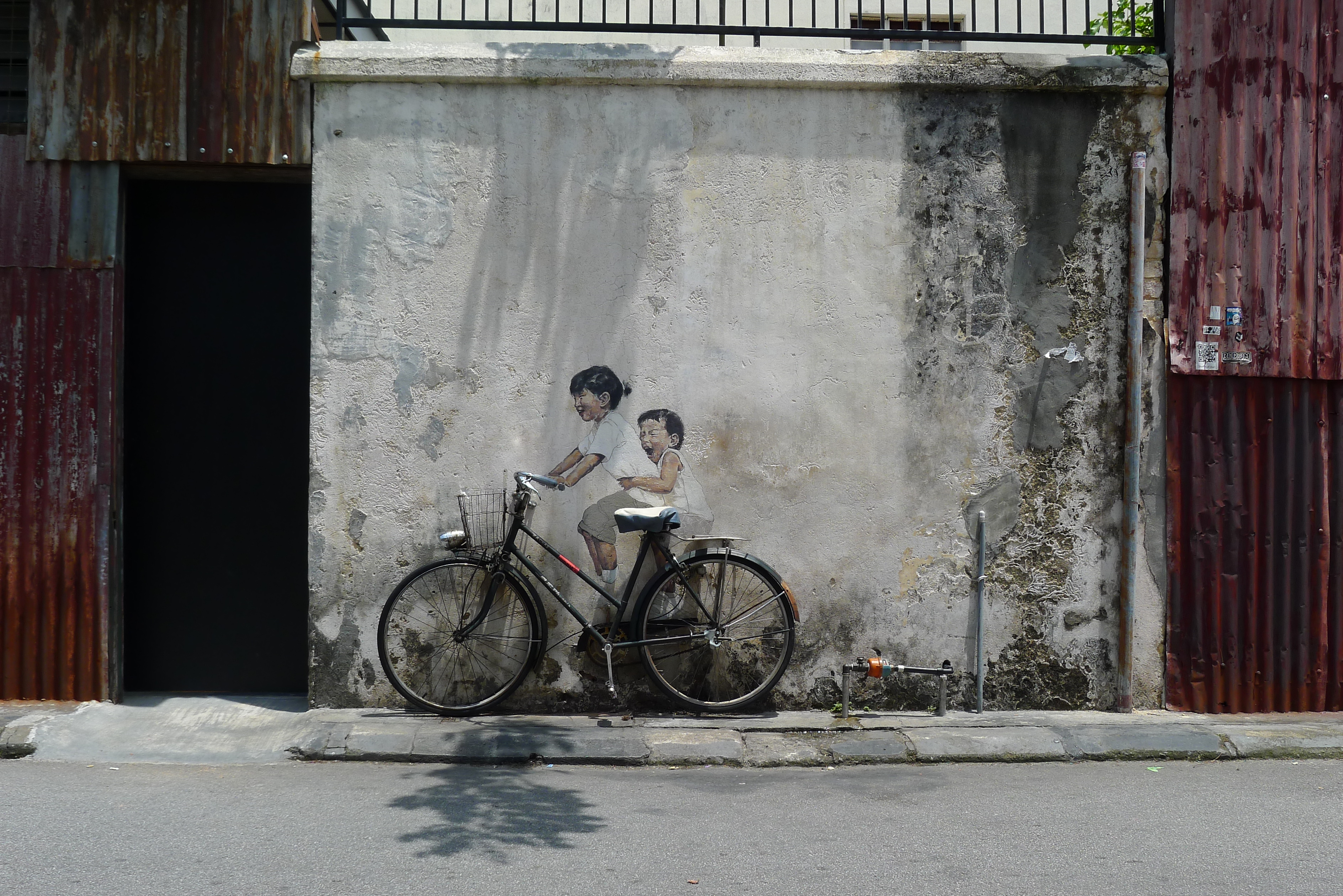
Ernest Zacharevic's mural Children on a Bicycle, George Town, Penang (2012)

Claes Oldenburg and Coosje van Bruggen's large-scale Bicyclette Ensevelie (Buried Bicycle, 1990) is installed in the Parc de la Villette in Paris.

Street artists have combined real bicycles with painting and urban fixtures. For the 2012 George Town Festival in George Town, Penang, Ernest Zacharevic painted Children on a Bicycle, a mural of two laughing children on a real bicycle fixed to the wall and positioned to look part of the painting. Brad Downey's The Perfect Throw (Essen, 2010) lifted a bicycle chain-locked to a lamp-post off the top of the post and re-threaded it so that the post passed through the frame, leaving the lock intact. For his Fountain (2013), shown in Basel, he mounted a rusty bicycle on a bicycle rack and siphoned canal water through its frame so that it poured from a hole in the handlebars.

=== Ghost bikes ===
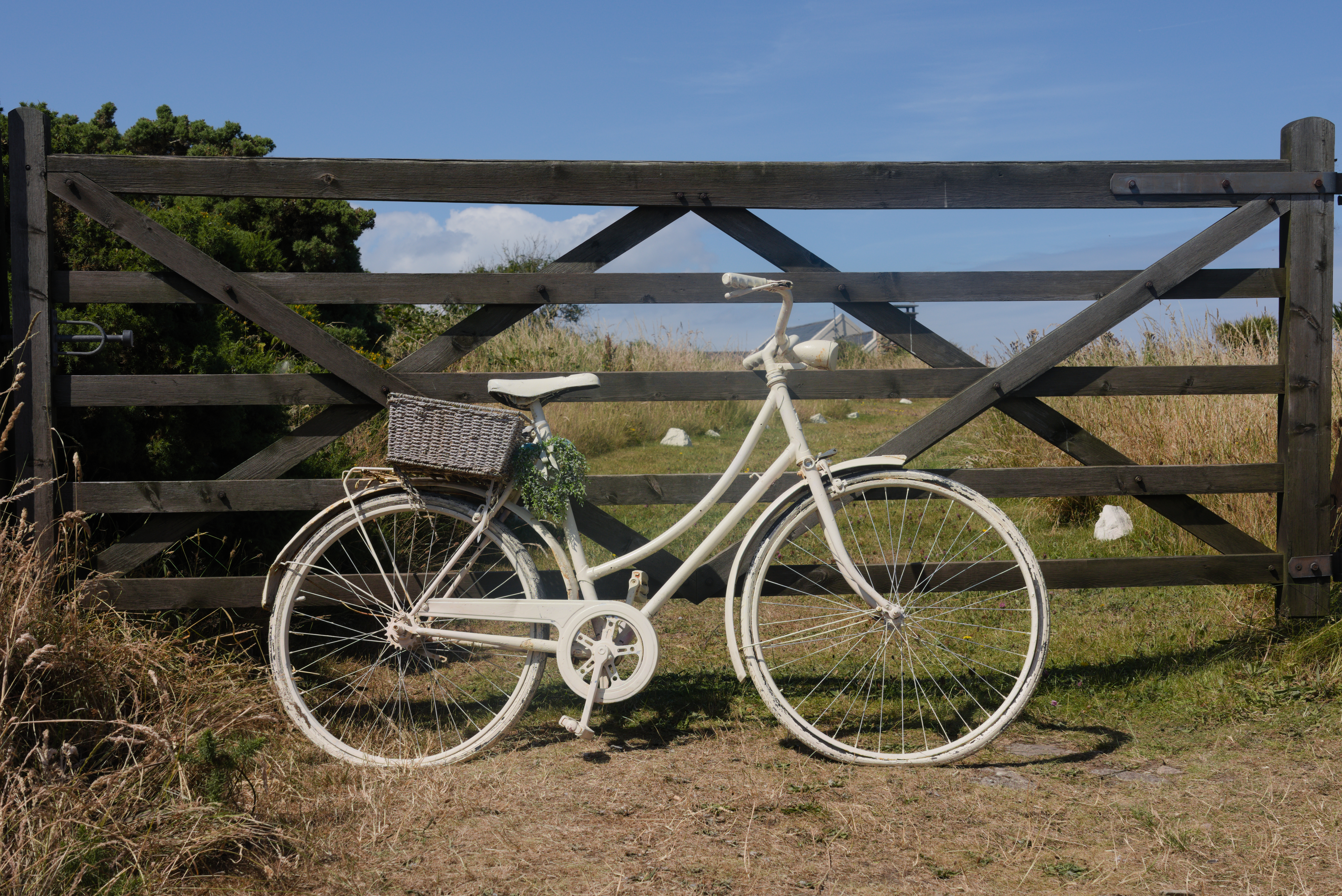
A ghost bike in Howth, Dublin (2022)

Ghost bikes are memorials to cyclists killed or hit on the street: a bicycle is painted white and locked to a street sign near the crash site, usually with a small plaque. The first were installed in St. Louis in October 2003 by Patrick Van Der Tuin, who painted junk bicycles white and placed them at accident sites he found in police reports, in a project originally titled "Broken Bikes, Broken Lives". According to ghostbikes.org, more than 630 ghost bikes had appeared in over 210 locations worldwide. They often become shrines, decorated with flowers, candles and other mementos.

== See also ==
- Art bike
- Kinetic art
- Found object
