= Au Vélodrome =

Painting by Jean Metzinger

- At the Cycle-Race Track (English)
- Artist: Jean Metzinger
- Year: 1911–12
- Medium: Oil on canvas
- Dimensions: 130.4 cm × 97.1 cm (51.45 in × 38.25 in)
- Location: Peggy Guggenheim Collection, Venice

Au Vélodrome, also known as At the Cycle-Race Track and Le cycliste, is a painting by the French artist and theorist Jean Metzinger. The work illustrates the final meters of the Paris–Roubaix race, and portrays its 1912 winner Charles Crupelandt. Metzinger's painting is the first in Modernist art to represent a specific sporting event and its champion.

Au Vélodrome remained in Metzinger's atelier until it was shipped to New York, where it was shown to the public for the first time, 8 March to 3 April 1915, at the Third Exhibition of Contemporary French Art, Carstairs (Carroll) Gallery—with works by Pach, Gleizes, Picasso, de la Fresnaye, Van Gogh, Gauguin, Derain, Duchamp, Duchamp-Villon and Villon.

On 10 February 1916 the American collector John Quinn acquired Au Vélodrome and the Racing Cyclist. Both works by Metzinger had been on view in the Carroll Galleries exhibition. The acquisition was preceded by a lively correspondence between Quinn, the gallery manager Harriet Bryant, and the artist's brother Maurice Metzinger.

In 1927 an exhibition and sale of Quinn's art collection took place in New York City. The sale was conducted by Otto Bernet and Hiram H. Parke at the American Art Galleries. A catalogue was published for the occasion by the American Art Association. Au Vélodrome (n. 266 of the catalogue) was purchased at the sale for $70 by American art dealer and publisher J. B. Neumann. Peggy Guggenheim purchased the painting from Neumann in 1945 and forms part of the permanent collection of her museum in Venice; Peggy Guggenheim Collection.

From 9 June to 16 September 2012 the painting was the subject of an exhibition in Venice entitled Cycling, Cubo-Futurism and the 4th Dimension. Jean Metzinger’s "At the Cycle-Race Track".

== Description ==
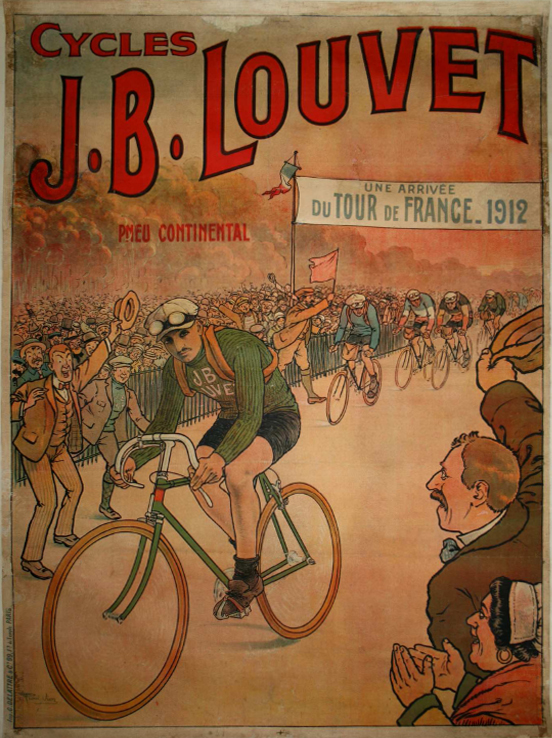
Cycles J.B. Louvet, Poster Tour de France, 1912, Collection Ivan Bonduelle

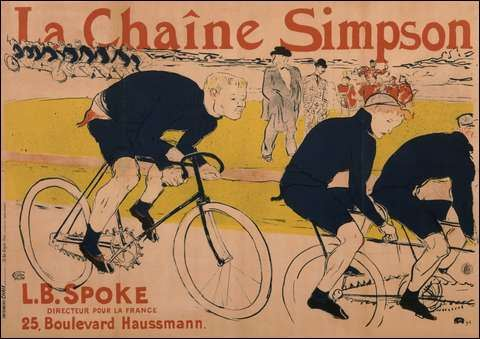
Henri de Toulouse-Lautrec publicity poster from circa 1890s, Constant Huret riding with a Simpson chain behind the Gladiator tandem pacer at the Velodrome de la Seine

Jean Metzinger, Au Vélodrome, 1912

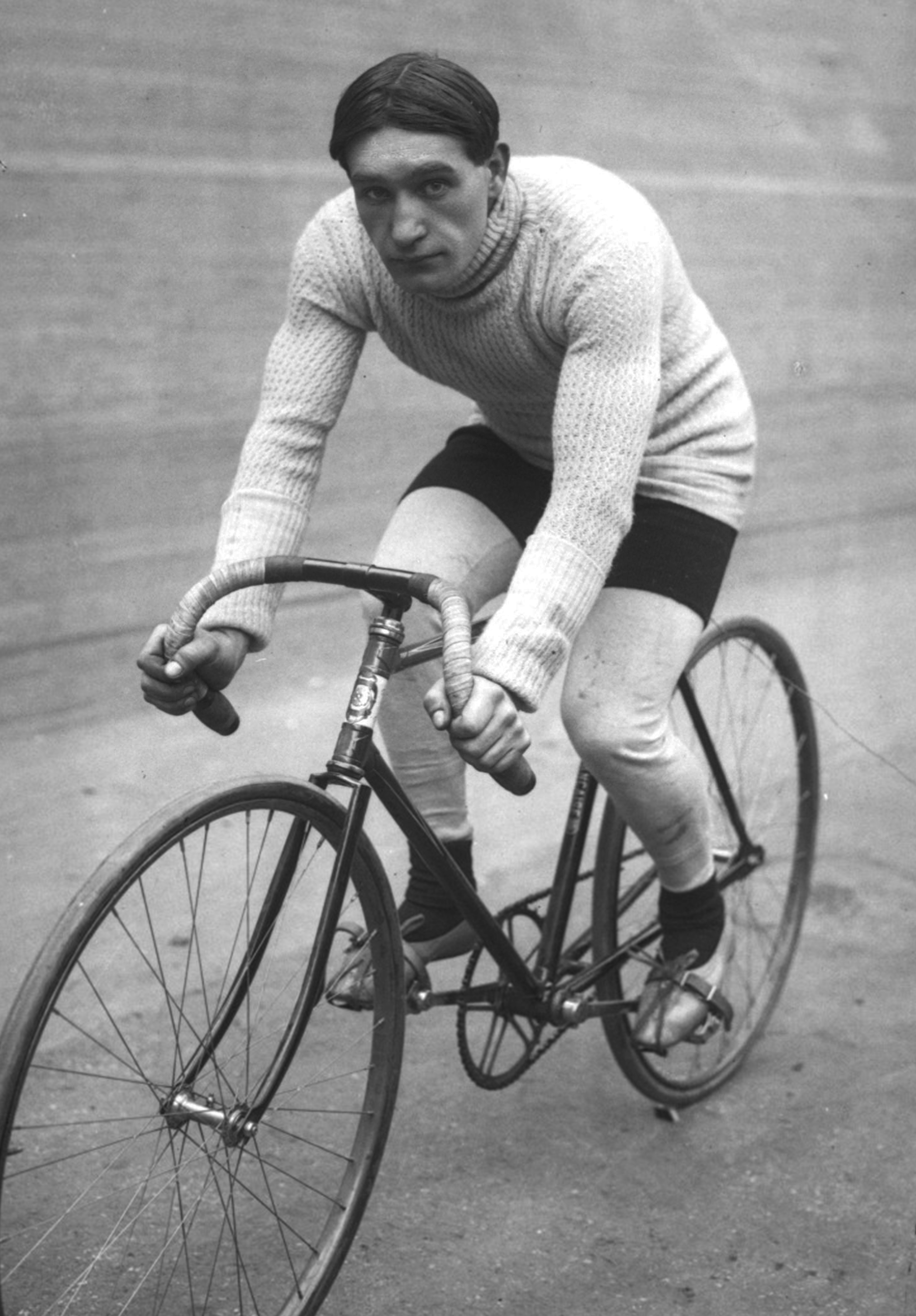
Charles Crupelandt, 1913

At the Cycle-Race Track (Au Vélodrome), is an oil, sand and collage on canvas, painted in a vertical format with dimensions 130.4 × 97.1 cm (51 3/8 × 38 1/4 in), signed JMetzinger towards the lower left.

In the foreground a road bicycle racer is shown in various degrees of transparency that give way to elements of the background, blurring the distinction between distances near and far. The cyclists head, for example, is almost entirely transparent, the audience composed of mosaic-like cubes is visible through the head, neck and arm, an effect reminiscent of the artist's Divisionist period. Metzinger's bicycle shimmers between the unique and the multiple, as if the two merge into one. The scene represents an extant photo-finish, a series of frames captured during the final sprint at the end of a race.

The presence of the other bicyclist is revealed by the rear wheel to the left of the canvas. Metzinger's painting appears to show the handlebars in two positions, but the handlebars along with sections of the bicycle frame are actually superimposed as a transparency (over the left hand, left foot of the cyclist and over the drive-wheel), representing two consecutive frames, one subtracted from the other, i.e., the road is visible 'through' the racer where the bicycle had been a fraction of a second earlier, as if to show motion through absence. With this type of game playing with contradictory visual codes (positive and negative space), Metzinger discerns the past and the present infinitesimally separated in time; while the perception of the future is left to the intellectual discretion of the observer to contemplate.

Cubist and Futurist devices appear superimposed in Metzinger's At the Cycle-Race Track, creating an image that is readable yet essentially anti-naturalistic. Cubist elements include the reduction of the geometric schema to simplified shapes, and the juxtaposition of rotating planes to define spatial qualities, printed-paper collage, the incorporation of a granular surface and multiple perspective. Parallels with Futurism include the choice of a subject in motion (the bicyclist), the suggestion of velocity (motion blur on the wheel spokes), and the fusing of forms in a static picture plane. Metzingers's work integrates the idea of an aesthetic generated by the modern myth of the machine and speed.

At the Cycle-Race Track illustrates the final yards of the Paris–Roubaix race, and portrays Charles Crupelandt, the 1912 winner, according to the art historian Erasmus Weddigen. The race is known for its extreme difficulty and danger of cycling over the narrow cobblestone roads of northern France. The Paris–Roubaix has since been referred to as the Hell of the North (L'enfer du Nord), and A Sunday in Hell. Metzinger’s painting was the first in Modernist art to represent a specific sporting event and its champion. He incorporated into the painting his concepts of multiple perspective, simultaneity, and time, according to his belief that the fourth dimension was crucial to the new art that could compete with the classical French tradition.

== Metzinger's words ==
We would often cross the broad avenue with the martial sounding name... The one that separated Courbevoie from Puteaux. It was in the peaceful garden of that welcoming household only a few years before the terrible year of 1914 that forms were born that, 50 years later, one would still think were new! We returned there often and soon we were spending our Sunday afternoons not merely conversing about aesthetic novelties but rather kicking a ball around or indulging in a spot of archery.

That garden was the place where my appearance as a cyclist at the Vélodrome d'Hiver was thought up. Gleizes and Villon claimed that I wouldn't be able to cycle 100 kilometres without putting a foot on the ground. I bet them that I could for the price of a lunch. It's actually a pretty hard thing to do to keep going over 100 kilometres on country roads. Neither of my opponents had a car and they didn't want to chase after me on one of those velocipedes. A journalist from our circle of friends suggested cycling in a velodrome which is actually just as tiring, especially for someone who is not used to it. But I agreed. A few days later, one morning at ten, I began my laps in the Vélodrome d'Hiver. An hour went by and then another. The spectators, Fernand Léger was among them, cheered me on with increasing enthusiasm until quite unexpectedly the sound of a gong brought me to a halt. I had won my meal by my honourable average speed. (Metzinger)

== 2012 exhibition ==
In 2012, one hundred years after it was painted, Metzinger's Au Vélodrome was showcased in an exhibition entitled Cycling, Cubo-Futurism and the 4th Dimension. Jean Metzinger’s "At the Cycle-Race Track", at the Peggy Guggenheim Collection in Venice, Italy. The painting is one of the pivotal Cubist works at the Peggy Guggenheim Collection. The exhibition, curated by Erasmus Weddigen, brought together two other paintings and a drawing by Metzinger treating the same theme, in addition to several other paintings on the theme of cycling. Just as Metzinger’s painting, the show combines a passion for the sport of cycle-racing with an investigation into the nature of the Fourth dimension in art; a topic much discussed in Metzinger’s immediate circle and alluded to in the number 4 visible in the stadium grandstand in the upper left quadrant of the painting.

Vintage racing bikes at the exhibition included one owned by Albert Einstein. The theoretical and sporting themes of the show were designed to illustrate theories of space and time formulated by Einstein and multiple perspective developed independently by the Cubists, and most notably by Metzinger, as early as 1910.

The combination of a sporting subject chronicling a new passion in French popular culture and an ambitious intellectual and visual apparatus central to the nascent Cubist movement qualifies Metzinger’s At the Cycle-Race Track as a masterpiece. (Guggenheim, Venice)

== Other versions ==
- Jean Metzinger, Study for At the Cycle-Race Track (Etude pour Au Vèlodrome), 1911, graphite and charcoal on beige paper, 38 x 26 cm, inscribed JMetzinger 1911. Centre Pompidou, Paris – Musée National d'Art Moderne / Centre de création industrielle
- Jean Metzinger, 1912, Cyclist (Le Bicycliste), oil on board with sand, 27.2 x 22.2 cm. Private Collection
- Jean Metzinger, 1912, Racing Cyclist (Coureur cycliste), oil on canvas with sand, 100 x 81 cm. On 4 February 2020 this painting was sold at Sotheby's London for 3,015,000 GBP ($3,925,937 USD), setting a world record auction price for the artist. The work was purchased by a private American collector.

== Gallery ==
=== Related works ===
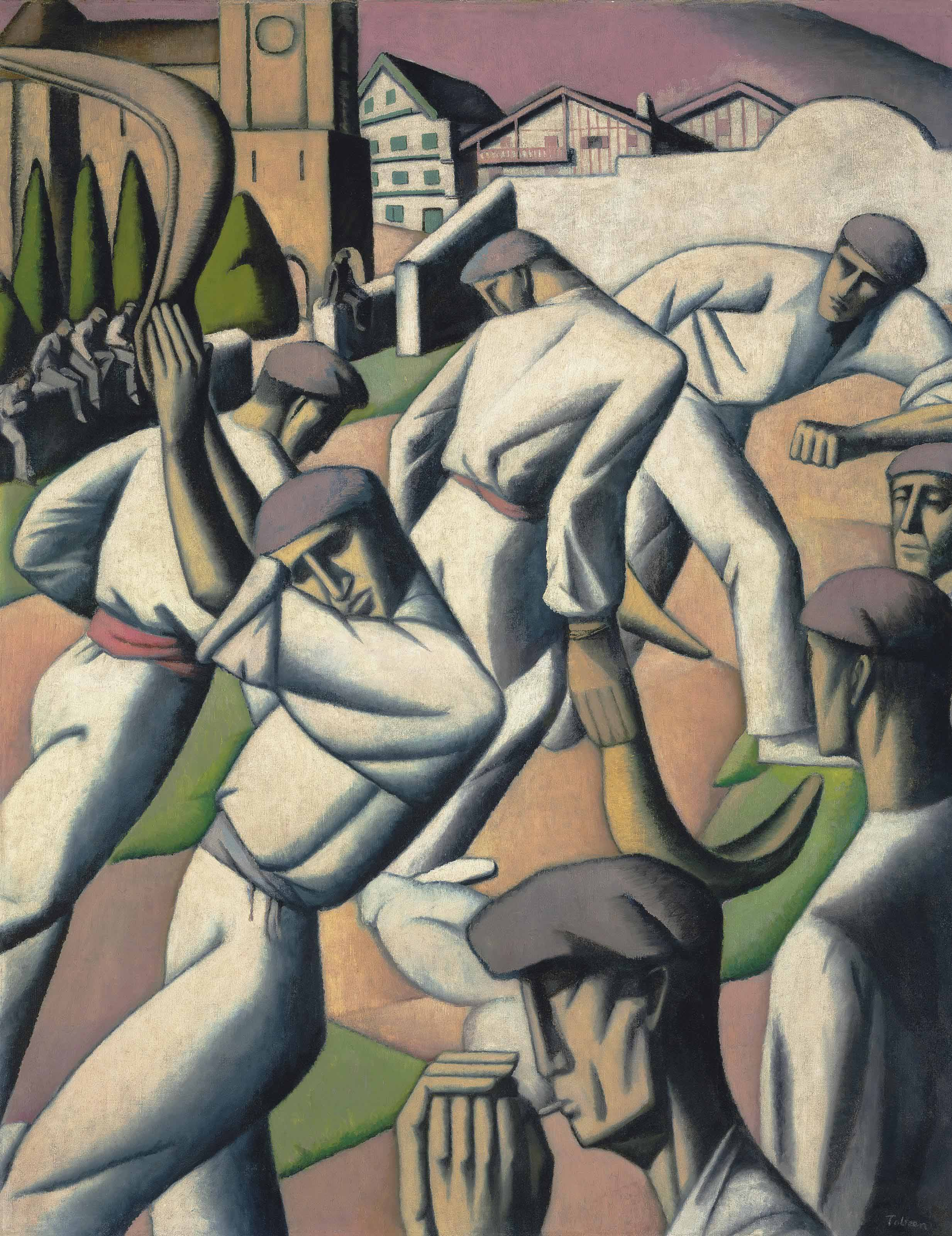
Tobeen, 1912, Pelotaris, oil on canvas, 147.5 x 115.5 cm, shown at 1912 Salon des Indépendants, and Moderni Umeni, SVU Mánes, Prague, 1914

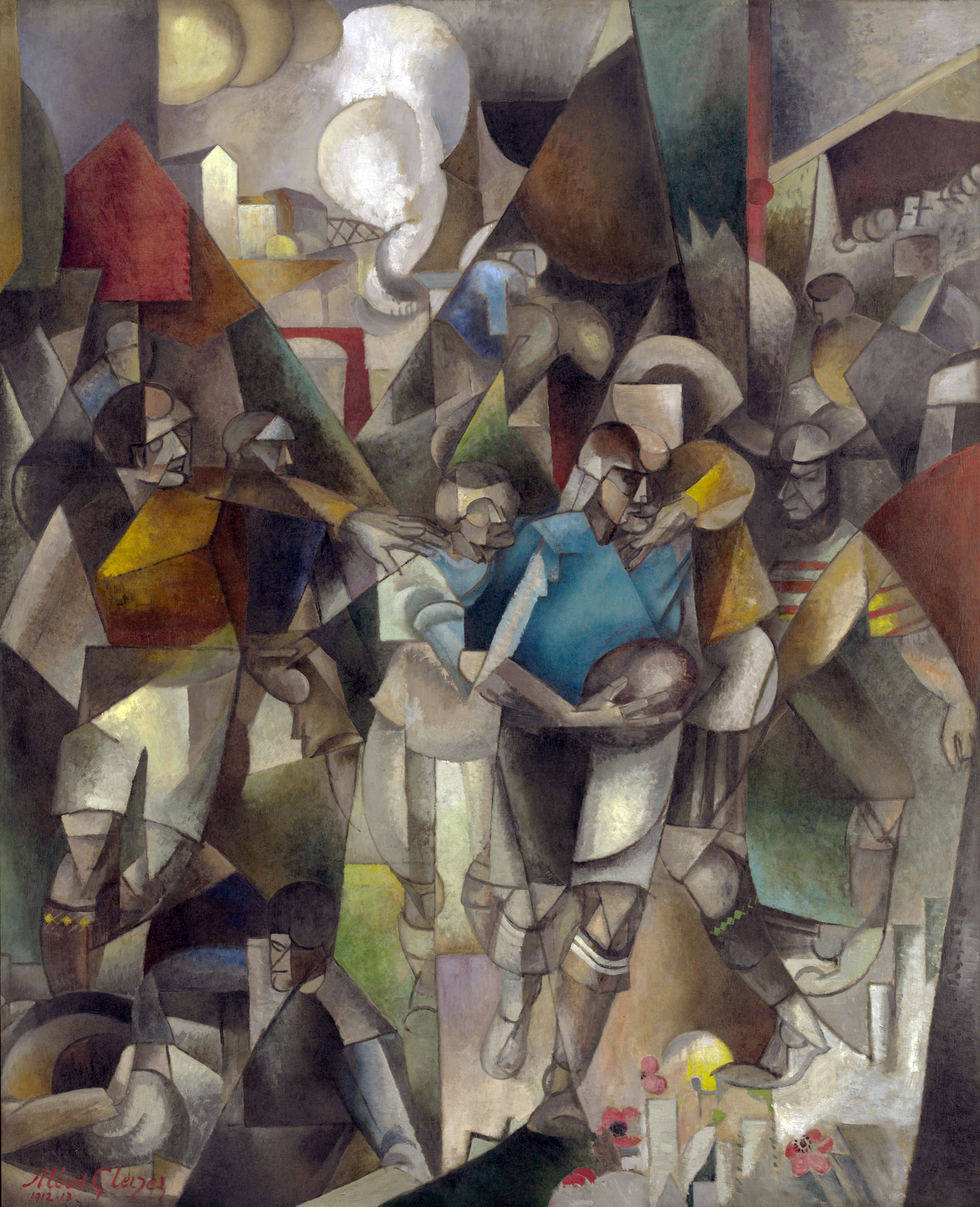
Albert Gleizes, 1912–13, Les Joueurs de football (Football Players), oil on canvas, 225.4 x 183 cm, National Gallery of Art, Washington D.C.

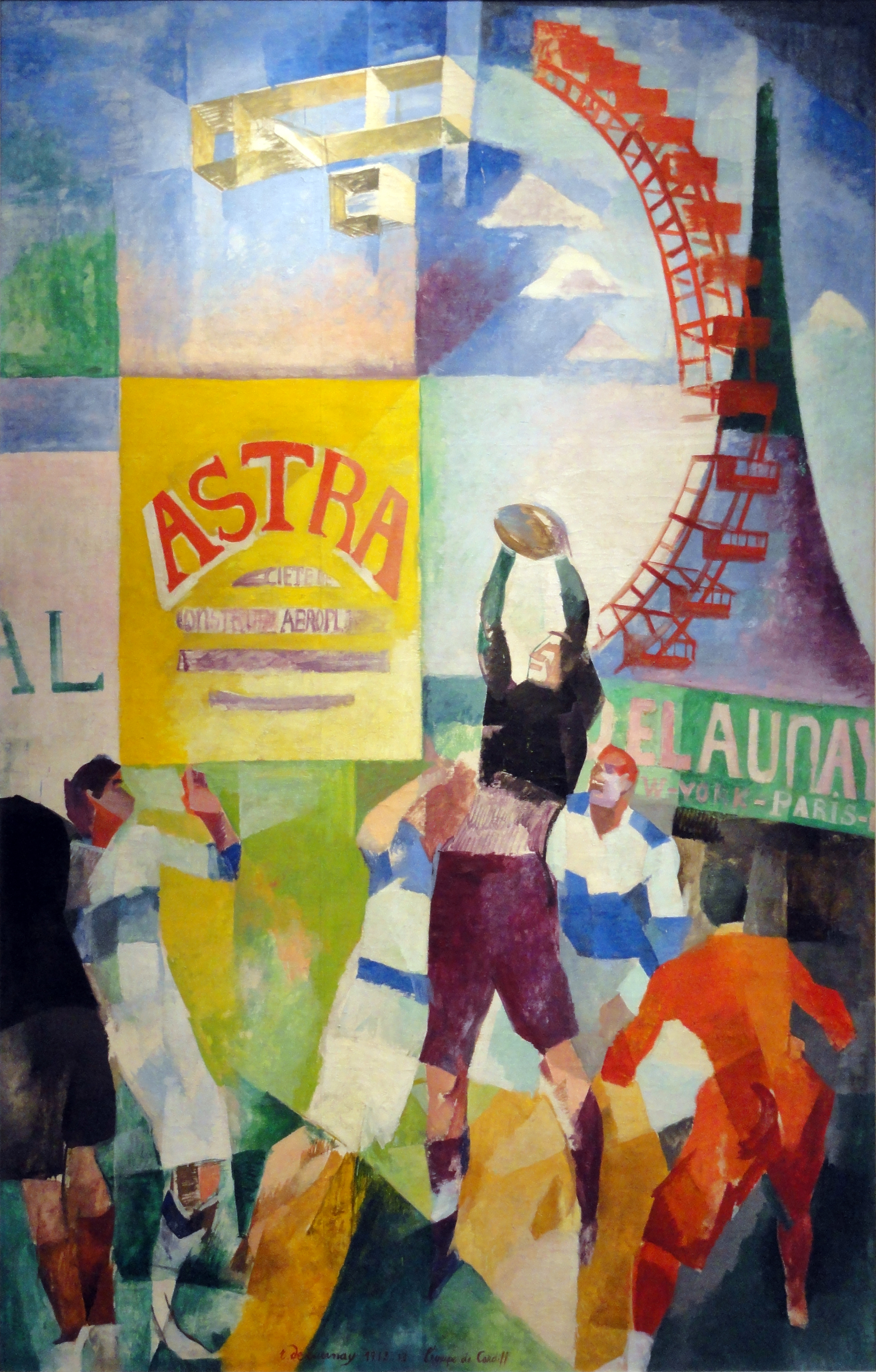
Robert Delaunay, 1913, L'Équipe de Cardiff, oil on canvas, 326 × 208 cm, Musée d'Art Moderne de la Ville de Paris

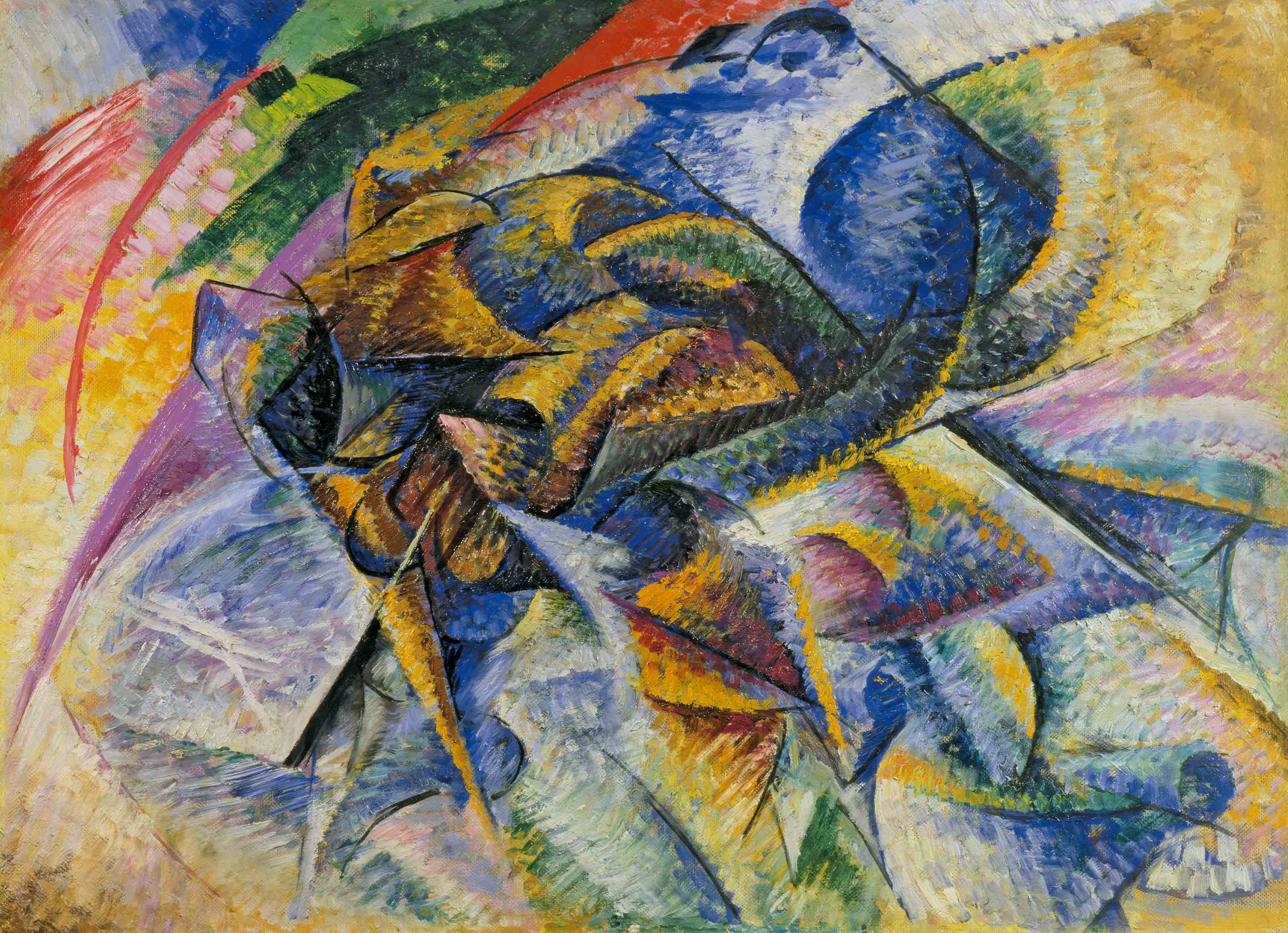
Umberto Boccioni, 1913, Dynamism of a Cyclist, oil on canvas, 70 x 95 cm, Peggy Guggenheim Collection, Venice

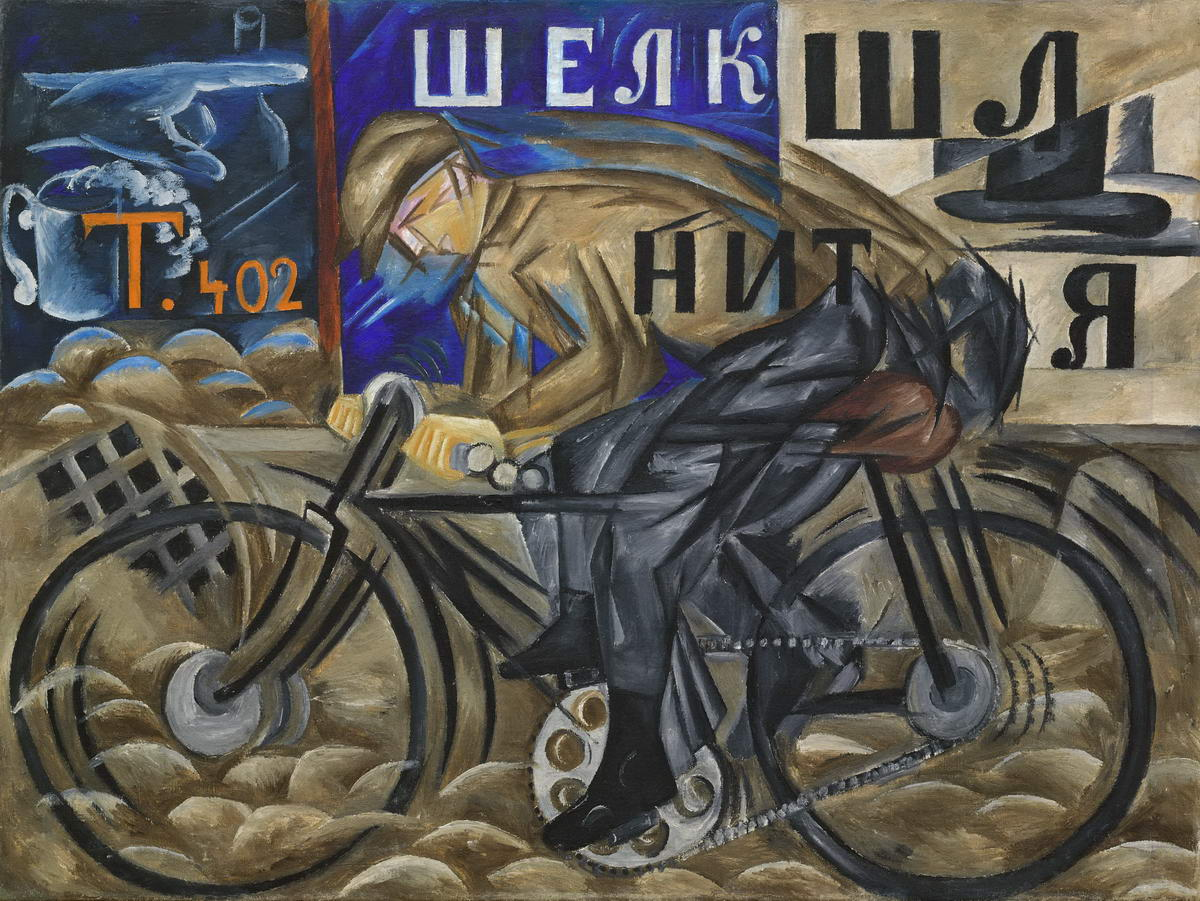
Natalia Goncharova, 1913, Cyclist, oil on canvas, 78 x 105 cm, State Russian Museum, St. Petersburg

=== Cycling 1908–1913 ===
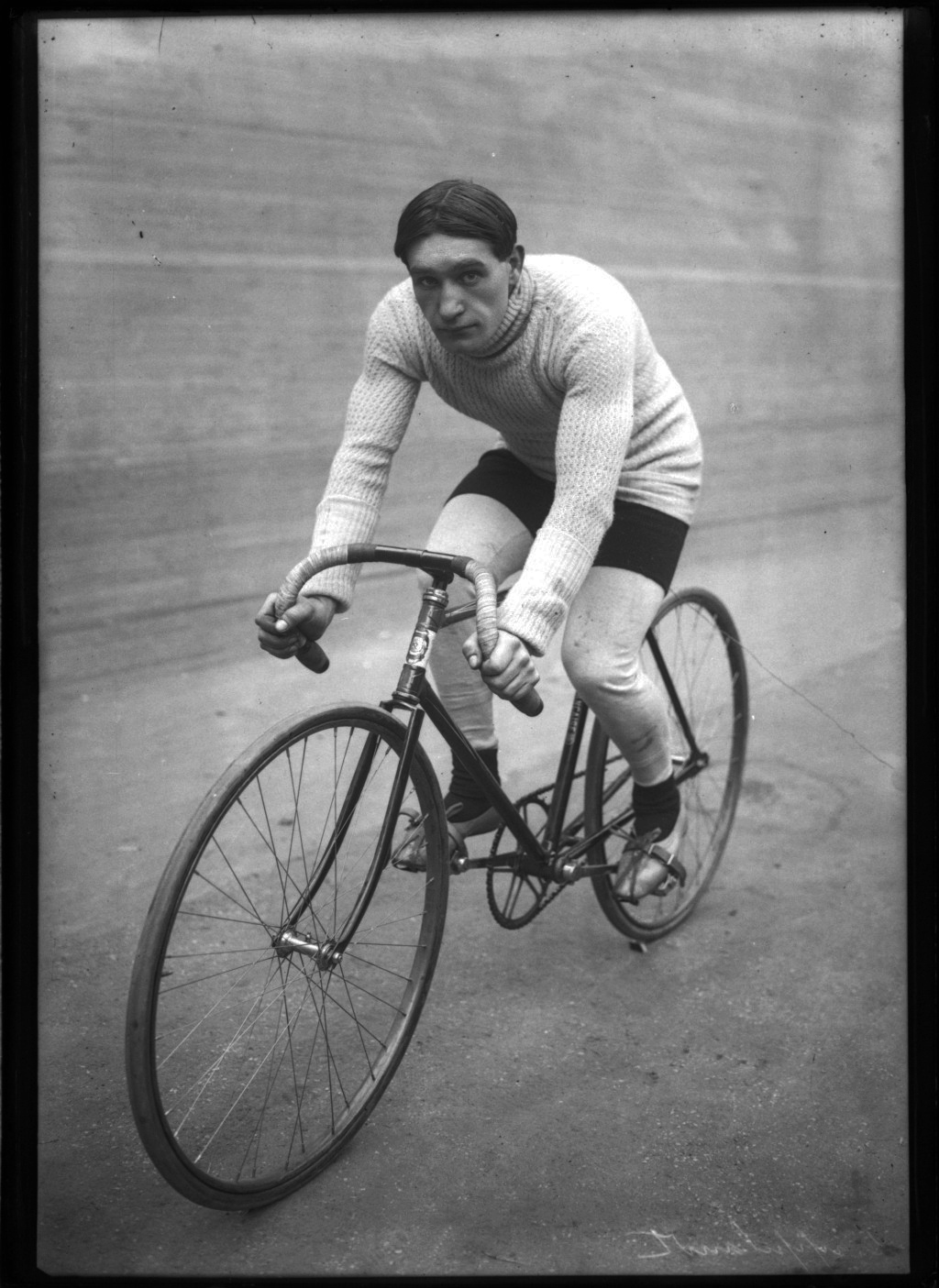
Charles Crupelandt (1913), a French professional road bicycle racer who won stages in the 1910, 1911 and 1912 Tour de France. His biggest successes were the 1912 and 1914 Paris–Roubaix

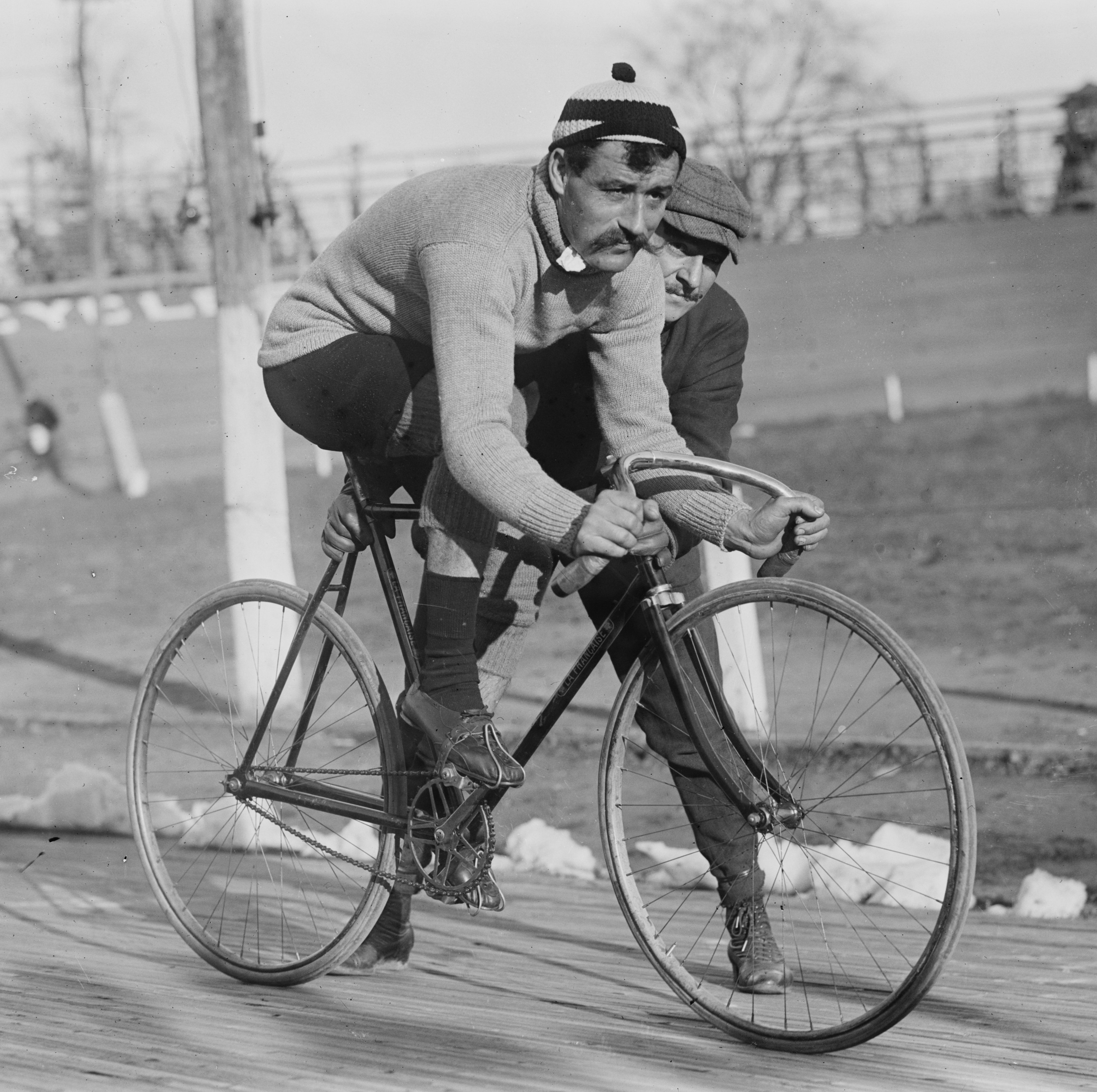
1909, the French cyclist Léon Georget (Big Red or The Brute), was known as The Father of the Bol d'Or, having won the race nine times between 1903 and 1919 in Paris

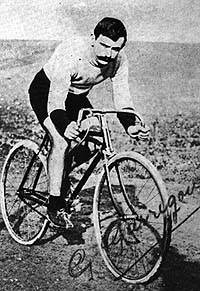
Gustave Garrigou, one of the best professional racing cyclists of his era, won the 1911 Tour de France, coming in 1st Overall, with 2 stage wins

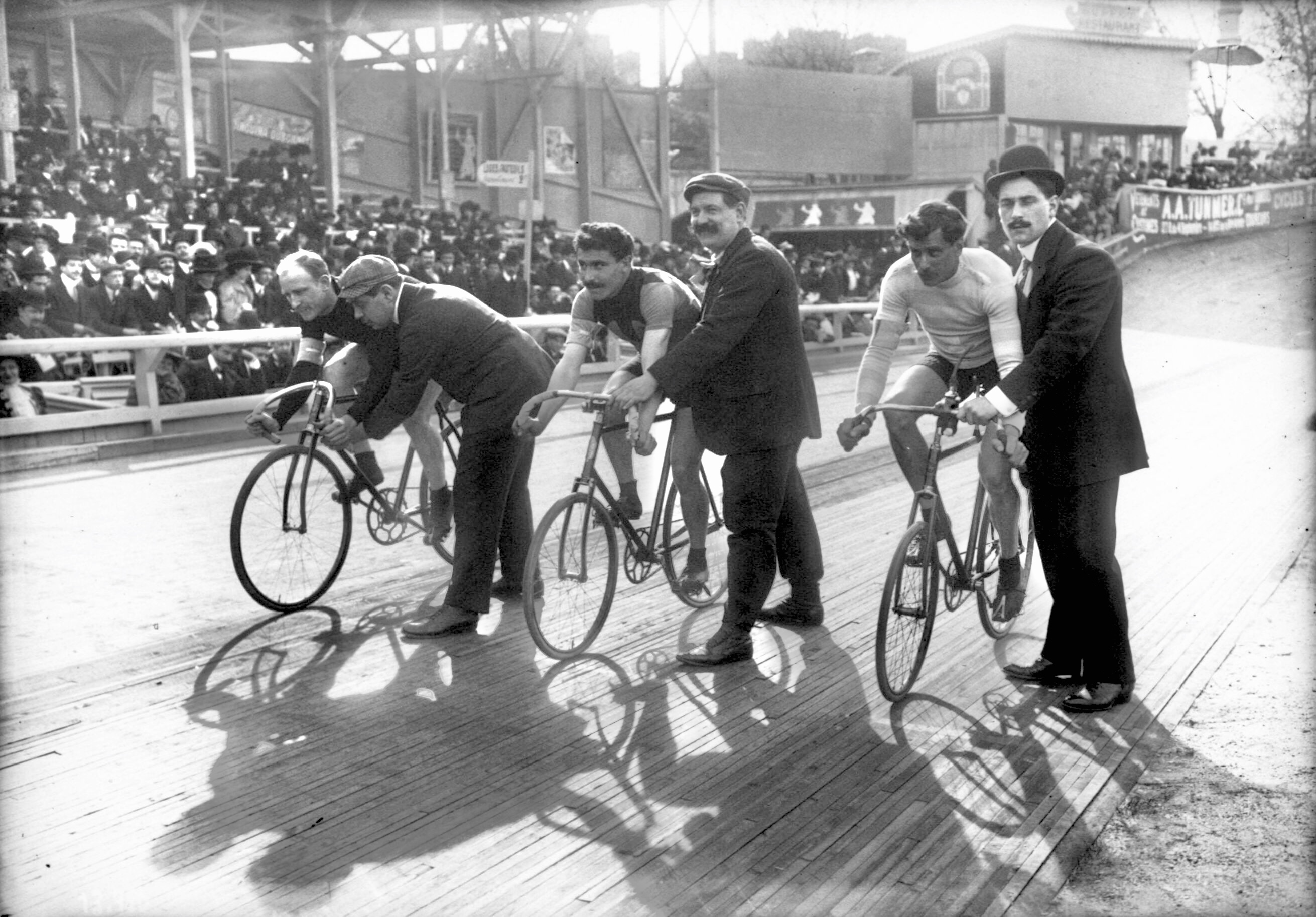
Émile Bouhours, Octave Lapize, who won the Paris–Roubaix from 1909 to 1911, and Seigneur, Vélodrome Buffalo, 25 April 1909, start of the 100 km race

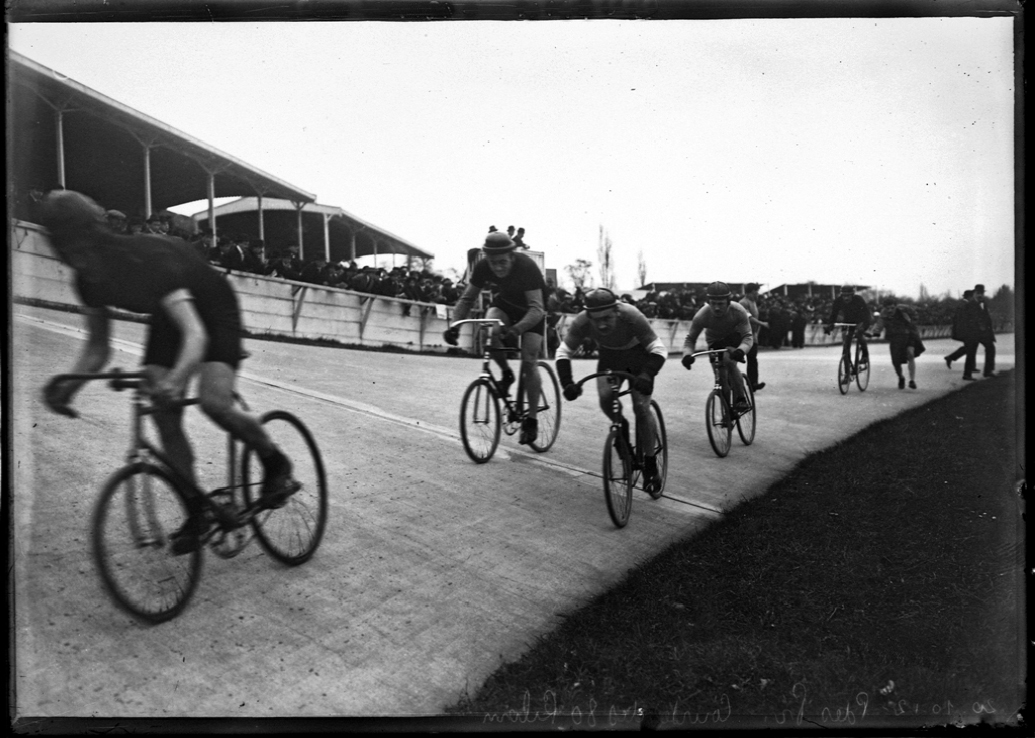
1912, Racing cyclists at the Vélodrome, Parc des Princes

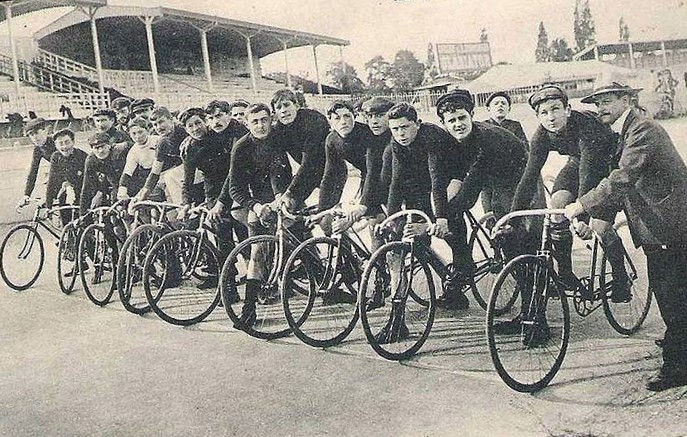
Vélodrome, Parc des Princes, Boulogne-sur-Seine, circa 1900

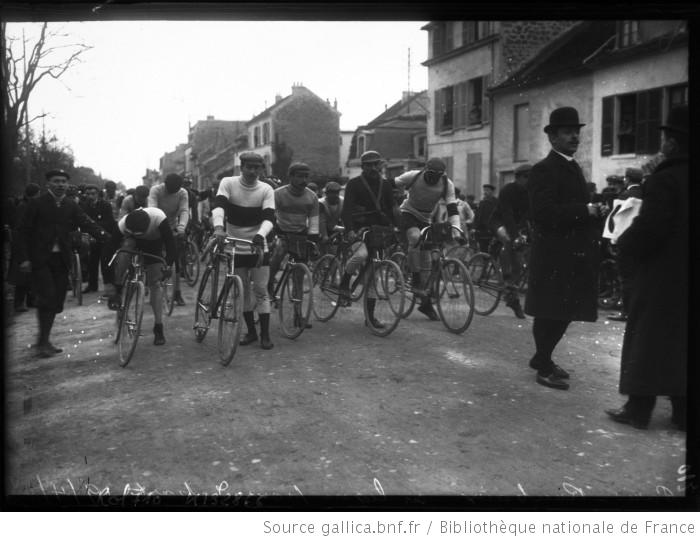
Paris–Roubaix, starting line, 19 April 1908

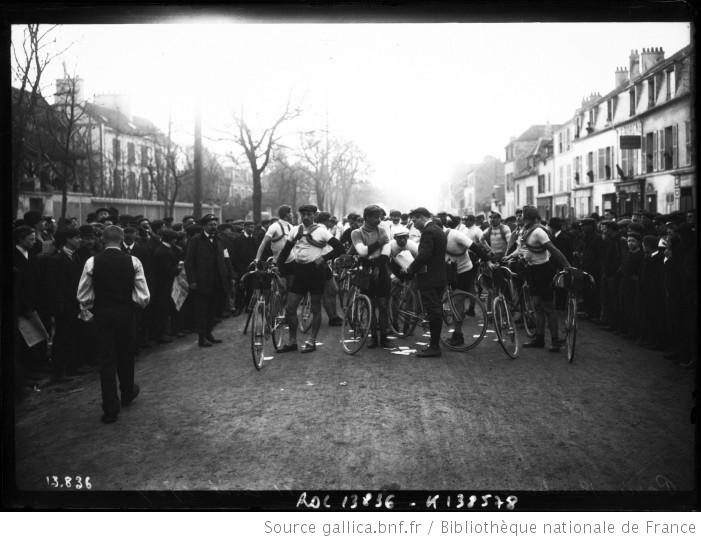
Paris–Roubaix, starting line, 11 April 1909

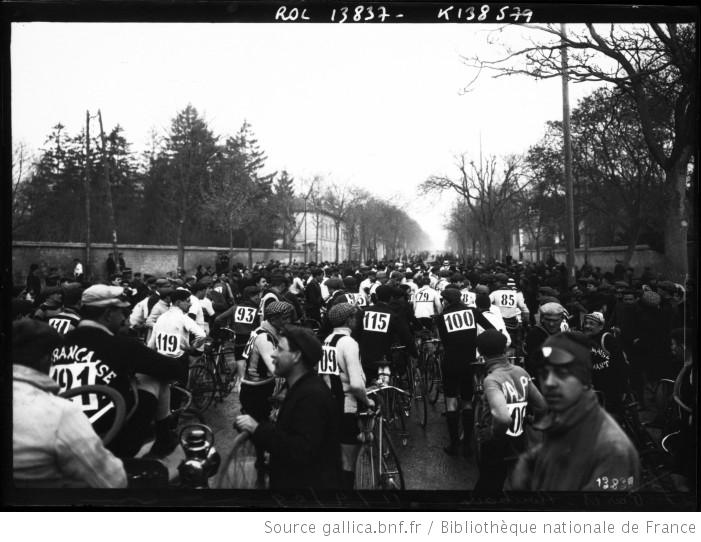
Paris–Roubaix, starting line, 11 April 1909

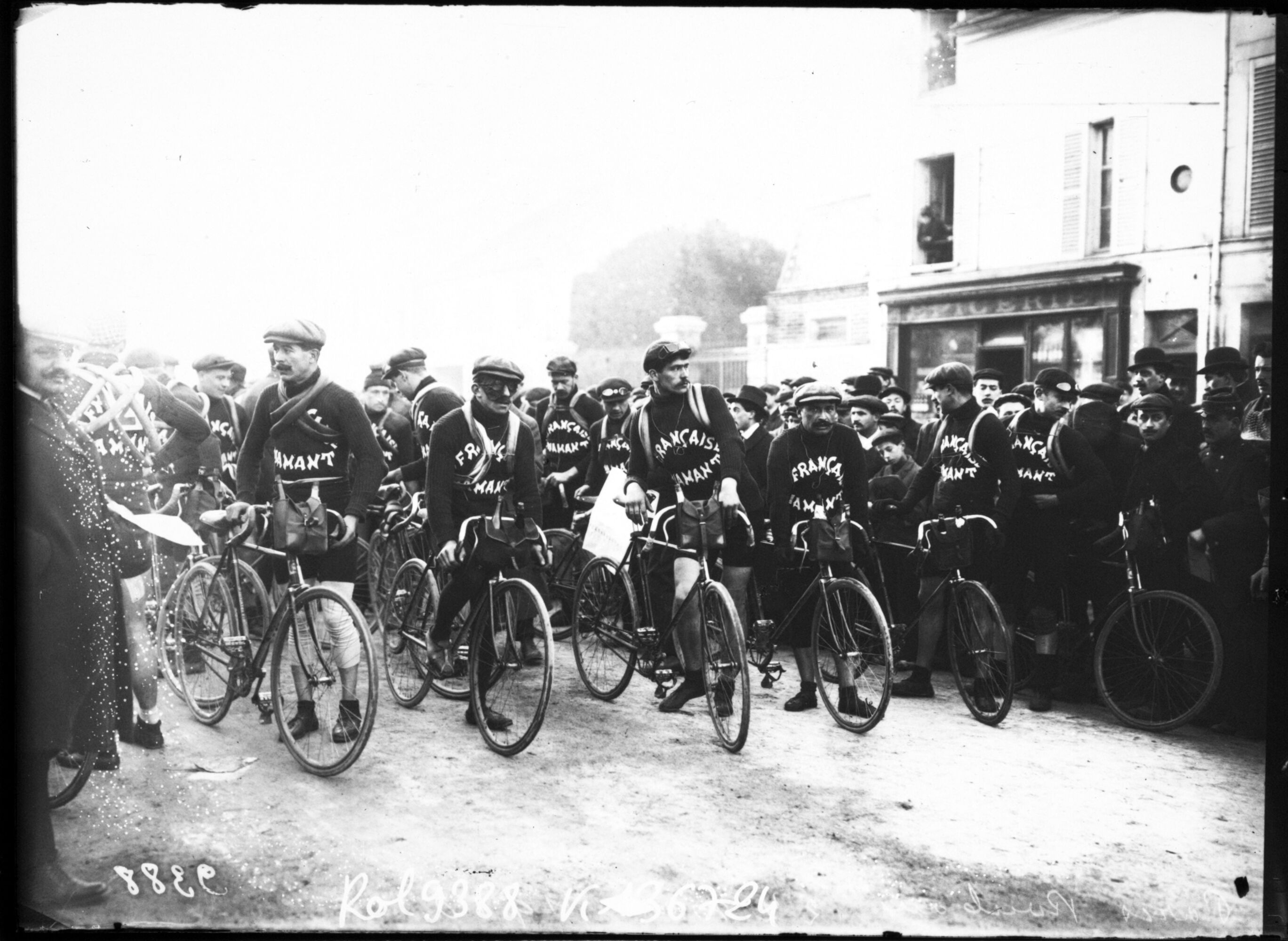
Paris–Roubaix, starting line, 24 March 1910

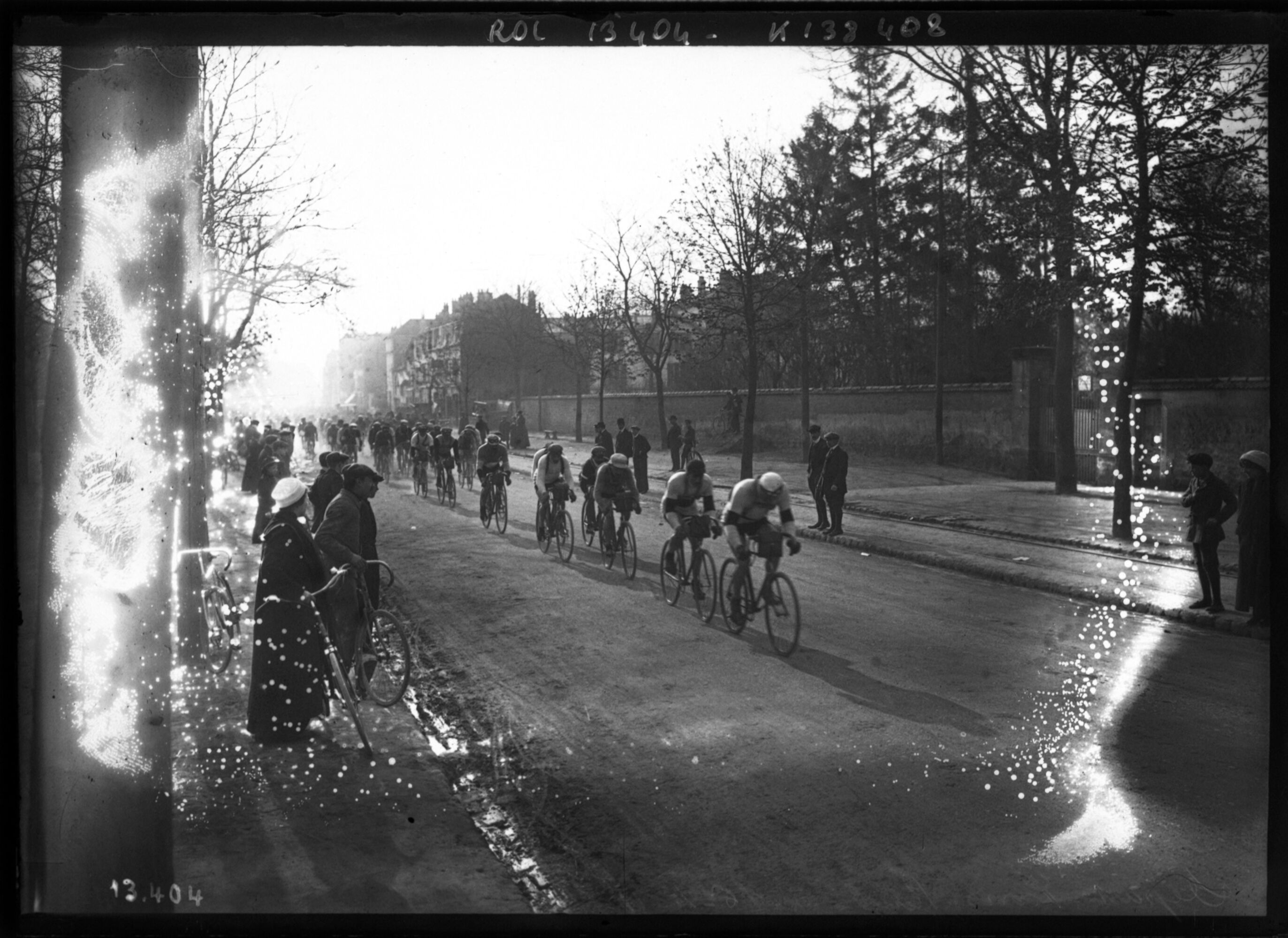
Paris–Roubaix, at Chatou, 16 April 1911

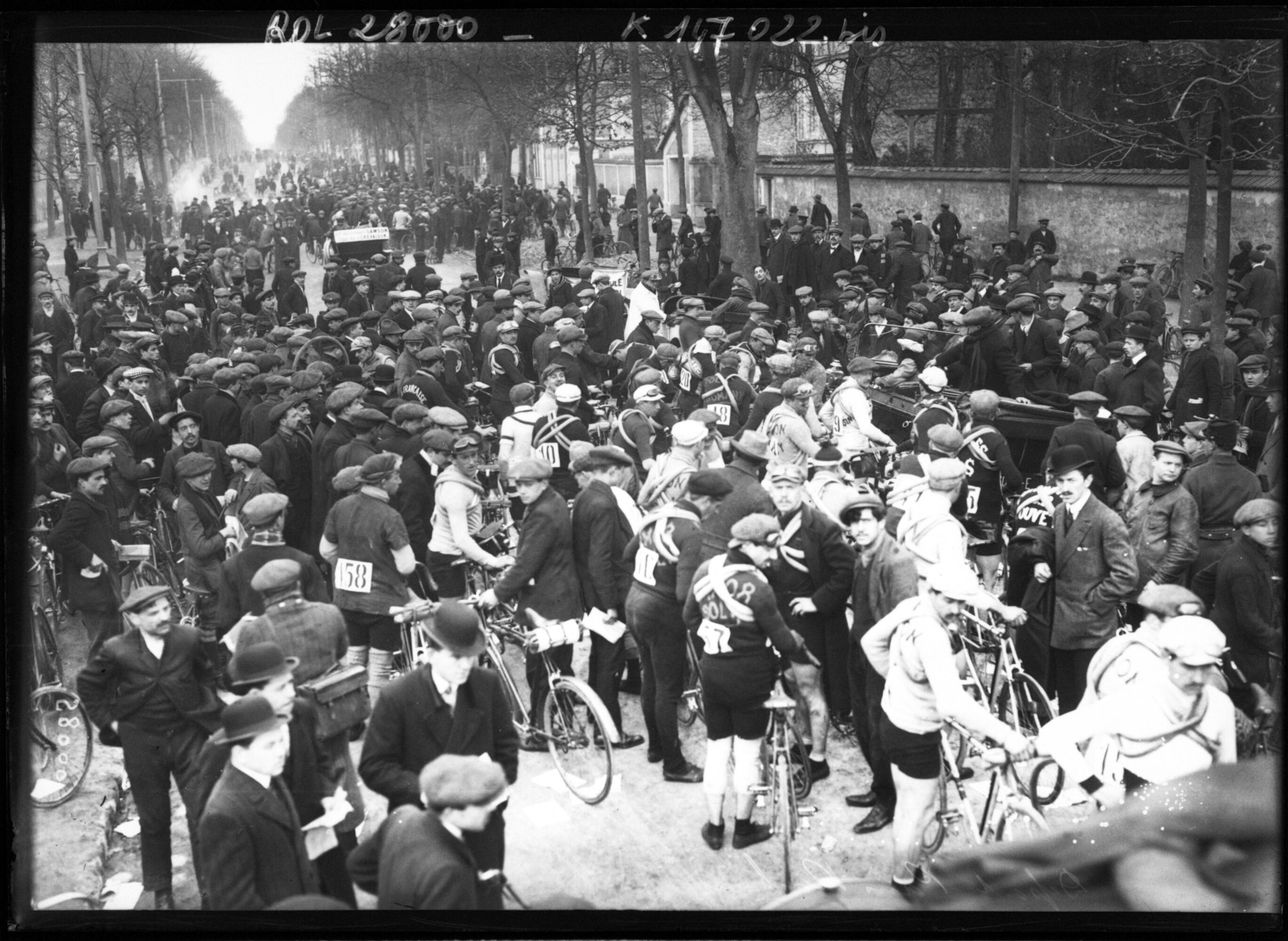
Paris–Roubaix, at Chatou, 23 March 1913

== Literature ==
- Art Index, 1939
- American Art Annual, 1927
- American Art Directory, 1927
- Modern painting, Maurice Raynal - 1953
- Jean Metzinger in retrospect, Joann Moser, Daniel Robbins - 1985
- Peggy Guggenheim Collection, Venice. Rudenstine, Angelica Zander, New York: Harry N. Abrams and Solomon R. Guggenheim Foundation, 1985, p. 532
- Masterpieces from the Peggy Guggenheim collection, Solomon R. Guggenheim Museum - 1993
- Art of the 20th Century: Painting, Klaus Honnef, Ingo F. Walther, Karl Ruhrberg - 1998
- The 20th-century art book, Editors of Phaidon Press - 1999
- Baedeker's Venice, Madeleine Reincke, Inc. Fodor's Travel Publications - 2000
- Art of the 20th Century, Ingo F. Walther - 2000
- Making Sense of Sports, Ellis Cashmore - 2000, 2005
- Futurism, Giovanni Lista - 2001
- Peggy Guggenheim: a collection, Peggy Guggenheim Collection, Philip Rylands - 2003
- The Mattioli Collection: masterpieces of the Italian avant-garde, Flavio Fergonzi, Peggy Guggenheim Collection - 2003
- Peggy Guggenheim & Frederick Kiesler: The Story of Art of this Century, Susan Davison, Philip Rylands, Dieter Bogner, [on the Occasion of the Exhibition Peggy and Kiesler: the Collector and the Visionary, Peggy Guggenheim Collection, Venice, 10 October 2003 - 9 January 2005], Part 1, Guggenheim Museum Publications, 2004
- The Art Of Bicycling: A Treasury Of Poems, Justin Daniel Belmont - 2005. Cover art by Jean Metzinger, "At the Cycle-Race Track" (Au Vélodrome)
- Modern art 1900–45: the age of avant-gardes, Gabriele Crepaldi - 2007
- The First Time: Innovations in Art, Florian Heine - 2007
- Cubism and Australian Art, Lesley Harding, Sue Cramer - 2009
- Action Figures: Paintings of Fun, Daring, and Adventure, Bob Raczka - 2010
- Cycling, Cubo-futurism and the Fourth Dimension: Jean Metzinger's at the Cycle- Race Track, Erasmus Weddigen, Peggy Guggenheim Collection - 2012

== See also ==
- List of works by Jean Metzinger
- Crystal Cubism
- Dynamism of a Cyclist by Umberto Boccioni
