= Cyclist (painting) =

1913 painting by Natalia Goncharova

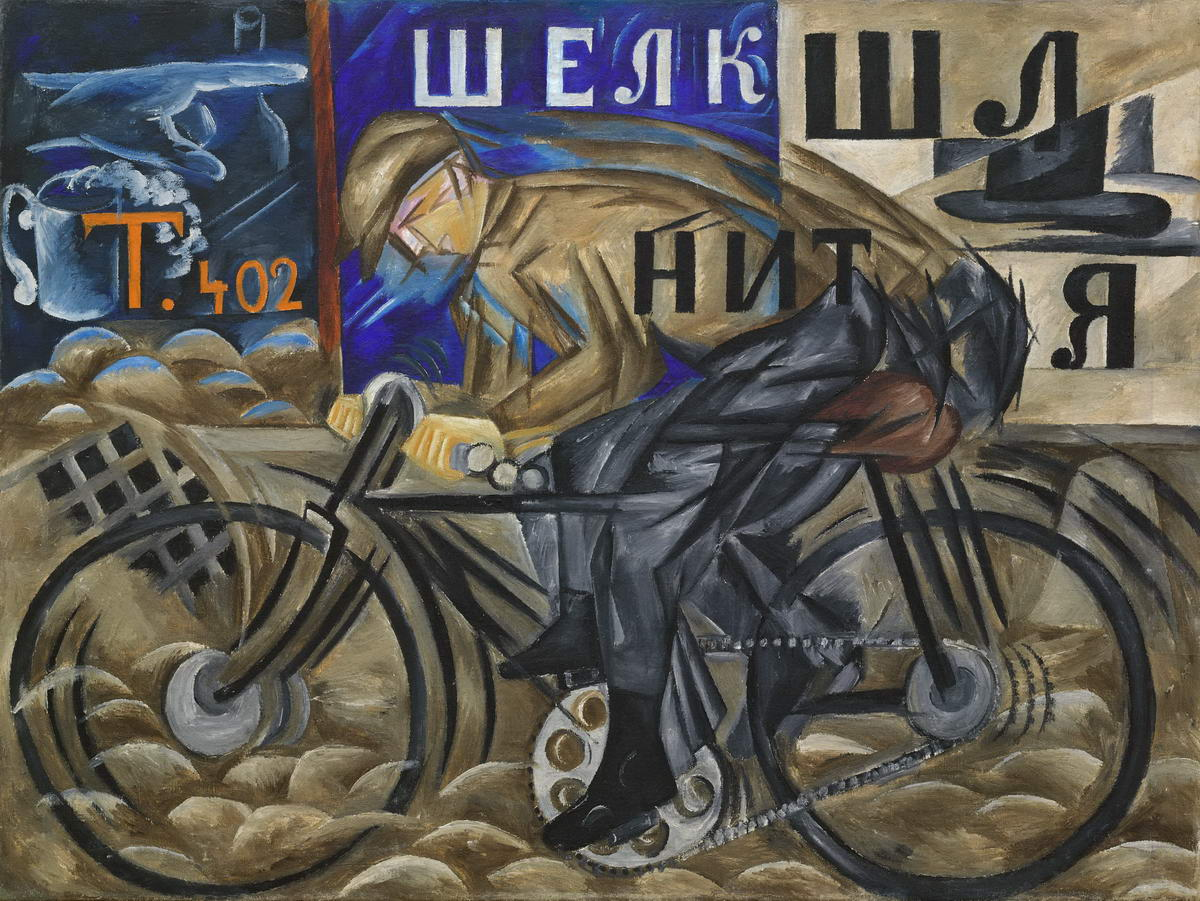
- Artist: Natalia Goncharova
- Year: 1913
- Medium: oil on canvas
- Dimensions: 78 cm × 105 cm (31 in × 41 in)
- Location: State Russian Museum, Saint Petersburg

Cyclist is a 1913 Cubo-Futurist painting by the Russian artist Natalia Goncharova. The painting is considered an "archetypal work" of Futurism by its current holder, the State Russian Museum.

== Description ==
The titular cyclist is a male figure bent over his bicycle while pedaling through a town or city. The street beneath the cyclist is cobbled while behind him lies a row of shop windows.

Goncharova was an early Russian developer of Cubo-Futurism, combining characteristics of both Futurism and Cubism in Cyclist. Cubist fragmentation, for example, is used to indicate the cyclist's speed. Movement is also portrayed in the work's Futurist elements, such as its repetition of forms and dislocation of contours. The dynamic effect of multiplied forms and repeated delineation is further amplified by Goncharova's use of broad brushstrokes. The presence of urban life, another concern of Futurism, is included in the work through the use of street signs in the background. However, the composition is distinct from classical Futurist works due to its higher level of visual balance. In particular, Cyclist contrasts with the more abstract and dematerialized representation of cycling found in Umberto Boccioni's 1913 painting Dynamism of a Cyclist.

Cyrillic letters from the shop signs are visually "shifted" onto the bicyclist in the painting. The art historian Tim Harte views the pointing finger on the leftmost storefront as part of a "visual clash" since it points in the opposite direction of the cyclist's motions.

== Exhibition and reception ==
Cyclist was shown with Goncharova's Airplane over a Train in the artist's 1913 solo show.

In his 2009 book on the Russian avant-garde, Harte considered Cyclist to be a "more mature" Cubo-Futurist painting compared to Goncharova's earlier works and wrote that the painting evidences Goncharova's intensified focus on "modern motion's distortion of space and image".

In a 2019 review of Goncharova's work, the art critic Laura Cumming described Cyclist as "an exhilarating picture" demonstrative of the artist's "excitement with futurism".

As of 2021, Cyclist is in the State Russian Museum and is located in the museum's Benois Wing.

== See also ==
- Au Vélodrome (1912 painting by Metzinger)
- Dynamism of a Cyclist (1913 painting by Boccioni)
