= Dynamism of a Cyclist =

1913 painting by Umberto Boccioni

- Dinamismo di un Ciclista (Italian)
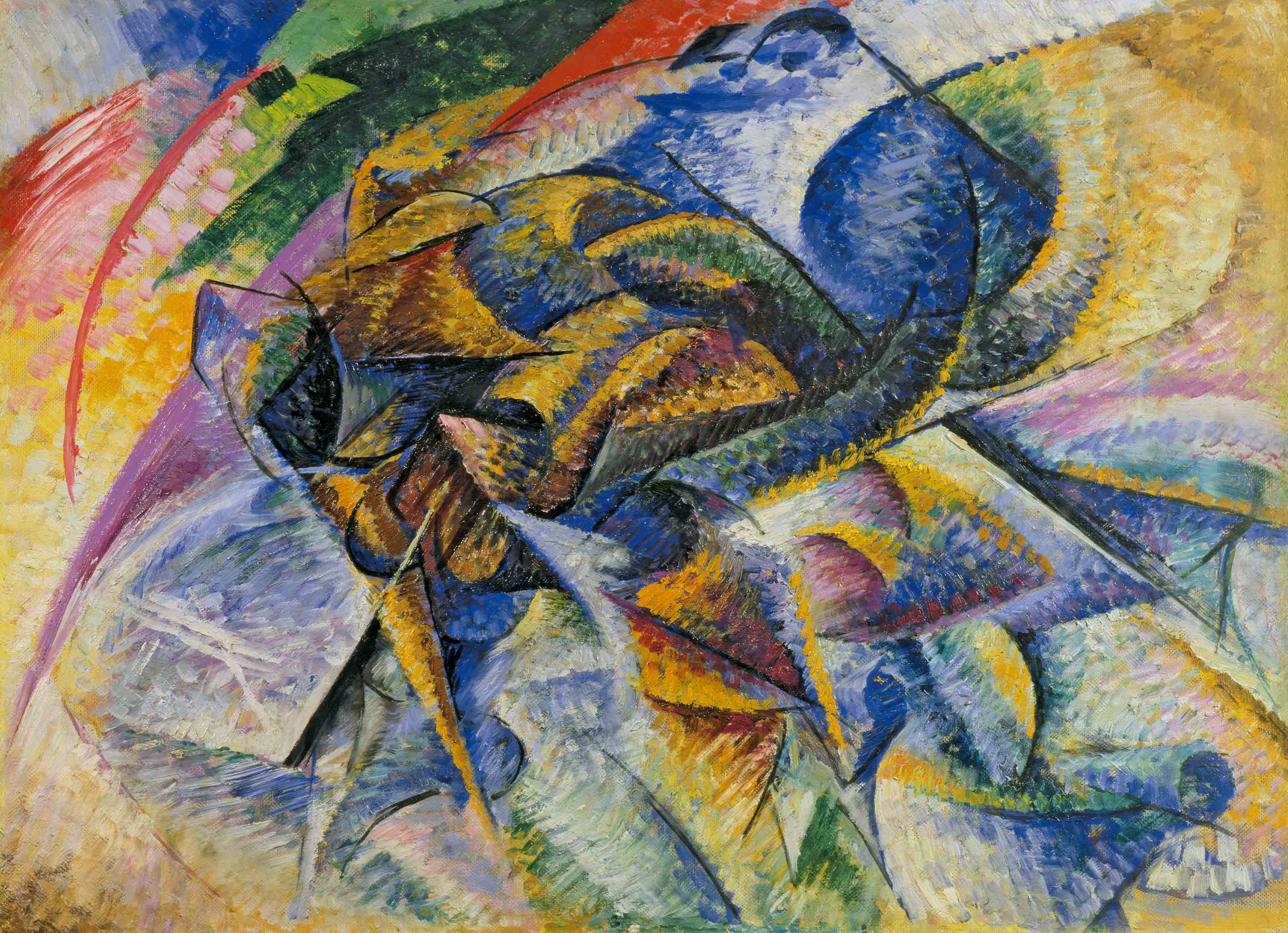
- Artist: Umberto Boccioni
- Year: 1913
- Medium: Oil on canvas
- Dimensions: 70 cm × 95 cm (28 in × 37 in)
- Location: Museo del Novecento (long term loan from the Gianni Mattioli Collection), Milan

Dynamism of a Cyclist (Dinamismo di un Ciclista) is a 1913 oil painting by Italian Futurist artist Umberto Boccioni (1882–1916) that demonstrates the Futurist fascination with speed, modern methods of transport, and the depiction of the dynamic sensation of movement.

== Background ==
Futurism was an early twentieth-century movement in Italy that sought to free the country from what the Futurists saw as the dead weight of its classical past. The Futurists were preoccupied with the technology and dynamism of modern life. The movement found its expression primarily in literature and art.

== Subject and composition ==
Boccioni's preparatory drawings for the painting (two shown below) depict a head-down racing cyclist, behind in the air, his movement indicated by the characteristic Futurist "force lines" and echoing curves. Force lines, which the Futurists claimed to have invented, show how an object would resolve itself if it followed the tendencies of its own forces and reflected the interest of the Futurists in the philosophy of Henri Bergson, who believed that material objects exist in a state of continual flux. The painting is therefore an attempt to represent the dynamic sensation of a cyclist moving through time and space rather than a snap-shot of a particular moment in time. The bicycle, figure, and the surrounding space seemingly fuse together in a single form. Although the bicycle had been invented in the early nineteenth century, it did not come into widespread use until the 1890s. Even in 1913, the bicycle, and the high speeds obtainable on it, still represented for the Futurists one of the modern forms of transport that they idealised.

In the final work, the lines of the preparatory drawings are translated into curves and cones, outlined using Boccioni's characteristic divisionist technique. This technique was primarily derived from the early Futurist Giacomo Balla. Boccioni, after visiting Parisian avant-garde painters, added new elements to the style, including the typical Cubist segmentation of planes. The discordant colour choices reflect the failure of the Futurists to develop a coherent colour theory to match their theories in other areas.

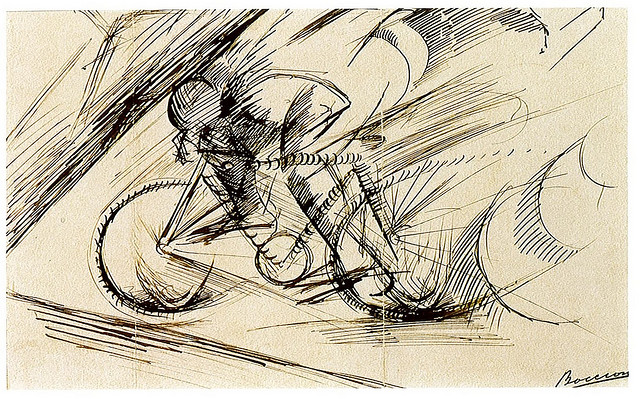
Sketch for Dynamism of a Cyclist, 1913. Estorick Collection, London.

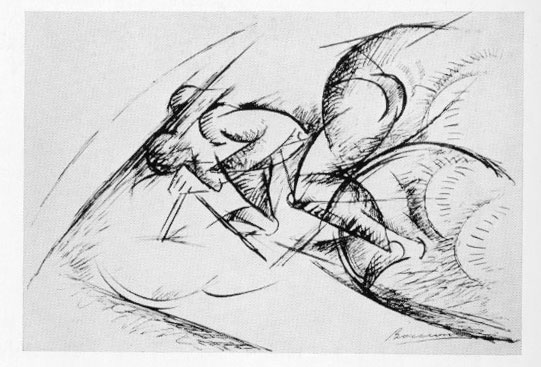
Sketch for Dynamism of a Cyclist, 1913

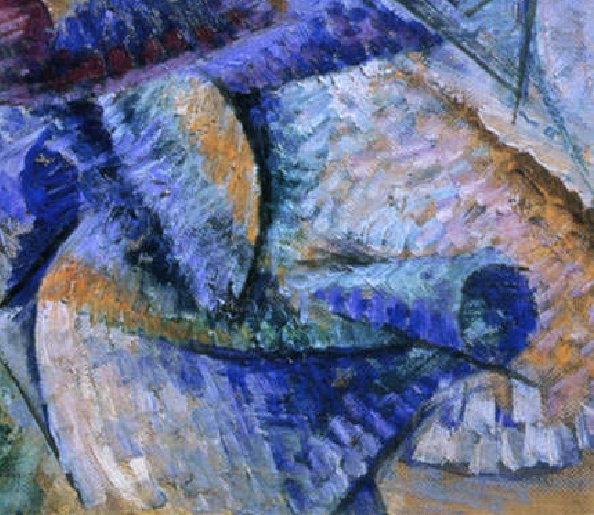
Detail of Dynamism of a Cyclist showing the use of divisionism

== Related works ==
This work is one of a series of "dynamism" paintings he created in 1913, including Dynamism of a Human Body, The Dynamism of a Soccer Player, Dynamism of a Footballer, and Plastic Dynamism: Horse + Houses. In these paintings, Boccioni utilized a more vivid color palette than in his previous works, and his application of the paint was thicker and denser.

The Russian Futurists explored many of the same themes as the Italians. Natalia Goncharova's Cyclist (1913) includes some of the same techniques for portraying movement used by Boccioni and the other Futurists, although the work is far more directly representational than Dynamism of a Cyclist and much less ambitious.

Jean Metzinger, At the Cycle-Race Track (Au Vélodrome), 1912, oil and sand on canvas, 130.4 x 97.1 cm, Peggy Guggenheim Collection, Venice

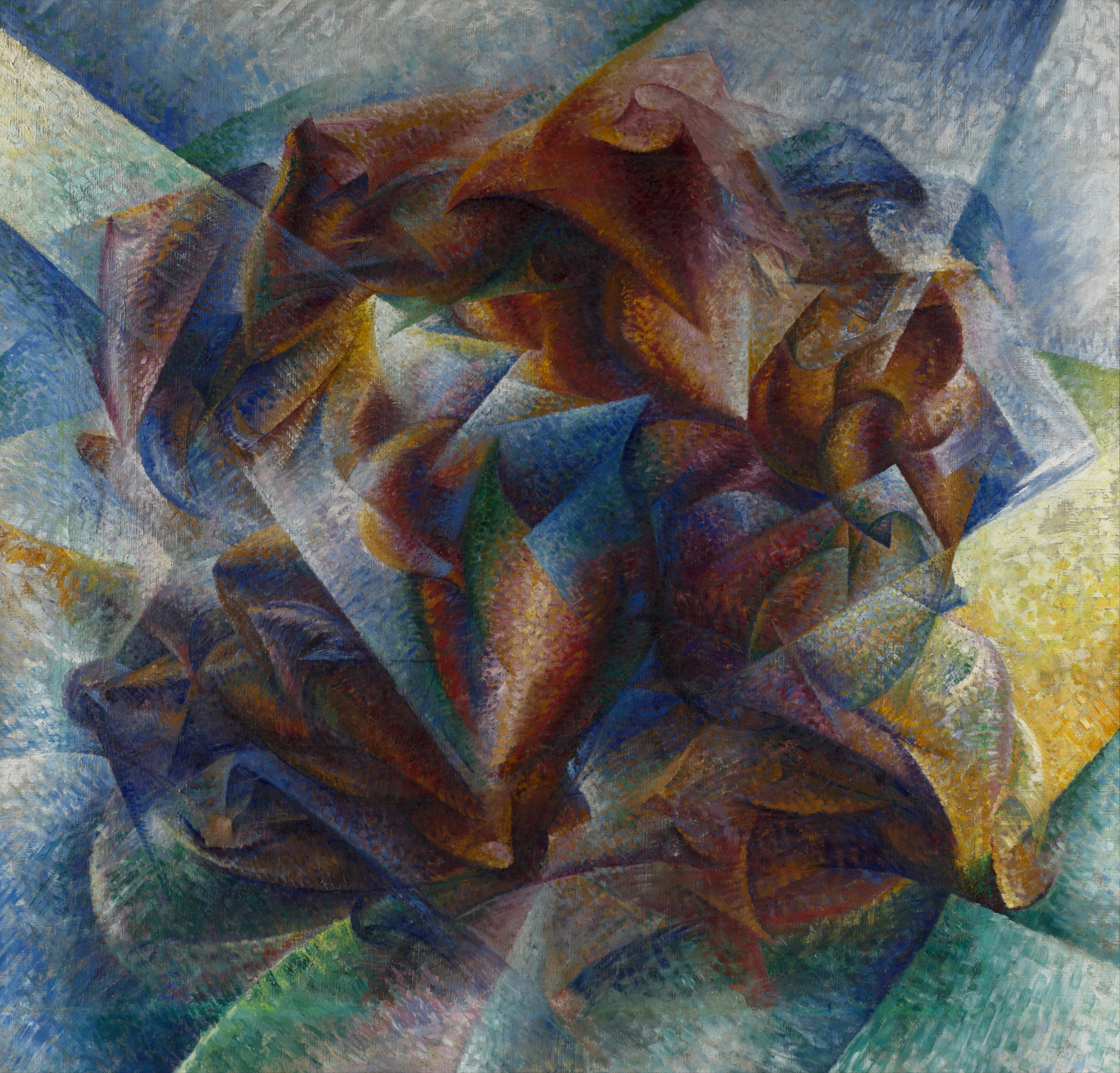
Umberto Boccioni, Dynamism of a Footballer, 1913, oil on canvas, Museum of Modern Art, New York

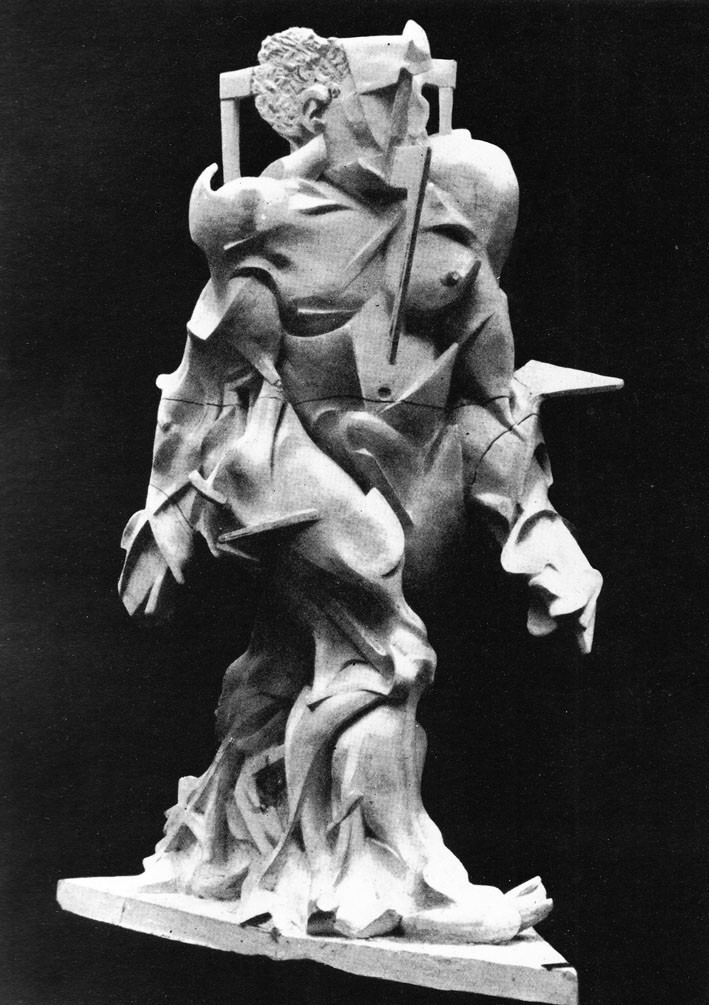
Umberto Boccioni, Synthesis of Human Dynamism, 1913. Destroyed

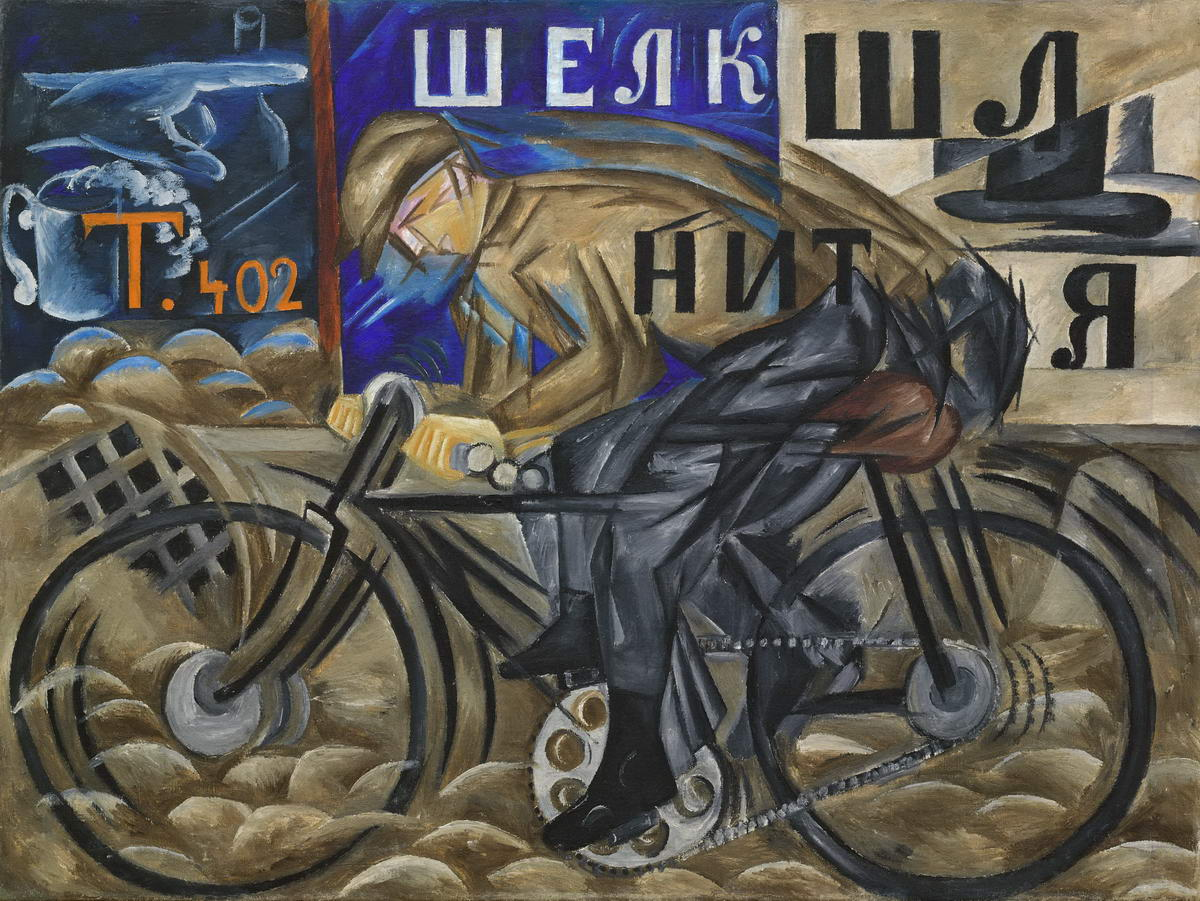
Natalia Goncharova, Cyclist, 1913, oil on canvas, 78 x 105 cm, State Russian Museum, St. Petersburg

== See also ==
- Cubism
