= Bull's Head (artwork) =

Found object artwork by Pablo Picasso

Pablo Picasso, 1942, Tête de taureau (Bull's Head), bicycle seat and handlebars, 33.5 x 43.5 x 19 cm, Musée Picasso, Paris

Bull's Head (French: Tête de taureau) is a found object artwork by Pablo Picasso, created in 1942 from the seat and handlebars of a bicycle. It is described by Roland Penrose as Picasso's most famous discovery, a simple yet "astonishingly complete" metamorphosis.

Picasso described the artwork in 1943 to visiting photographer George Brassaï, saying:

Guess how I made the bull's head? One day, in a pile of objects all jumbled up together, I found an old bicycle seat right next to a rusty set of handlebars. In a flash, they joined together in my head. The idea of the Bull's Head came to me before I had a chance to think. All I did was weld them together.... But ... if you were only to see the bull's head and not the bicycle seat and handlebars that form it, the sculpture would lose some of its impact."

In 1944, catalogued as Bicycle Seat, the sculpture was displayed at the Salon d'Automne in Paris together with another 78 works. Visitors were shocked by Picasso's new works and a demonstration took place, during which Bicycle Seat was one of the pieces removed from the wall.

Bull's Head is described by art critic Eric Gibson as "unique among [Picasso's] assemblages for its 'transparency'.... [T]here is no attempt to play down the real-world identity of the constituent parts". Gibson adds that the sculpture is "a moment of wit and whimsy.... At once both childlike and highly sophisticated in its simplicity, it stands as an assertion of the transforming power of the human imagination at a time when human values were under siege."

The sculpture is in the permanent collection of the Picasso Museum in Paris.
